= History of inline skates =

The documented history of inline skates dates back to the early 18th century, when enterprising inventors sought to make boots roll on wheels to emulate the gliding of ice blades on dry land. Because these early inline skates were modeled after ice blades, their wheels were arranged in a single line. Skates were simply assumed to have a single runner, whether it was a steel blade on an ice skate or a row of wheels on a wheeled skate.

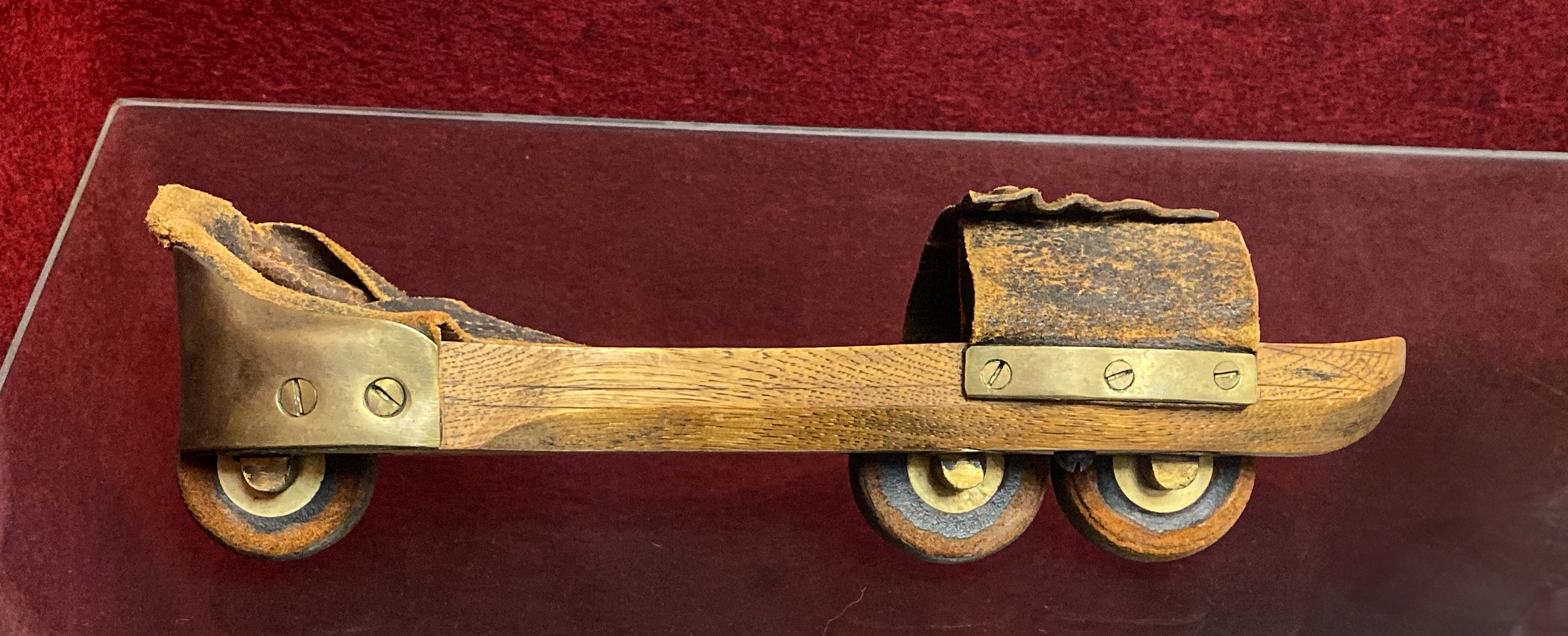
First patented wheeled skate - 1819

The first known rollerskate was invented by Joseph Merlin in the 1760s.

The first patented wheeled skate was filed in France in 1819 by Charles-Louis Petibled. From that point forward, more patents and documented designs continued to explore wheeled alternatives to ice skates. Around 1860, wheeled skates began to gain popularity, and new patents appeared under names such as "roller-skates" and "parlor skates". As inventions increased, roller skates began to diverge from the original single-line layout. Inventors experimented with two rows of wheels as a learning platform for beginner skaters. These double-row skates offered greater stability, but they were difficult to turn.

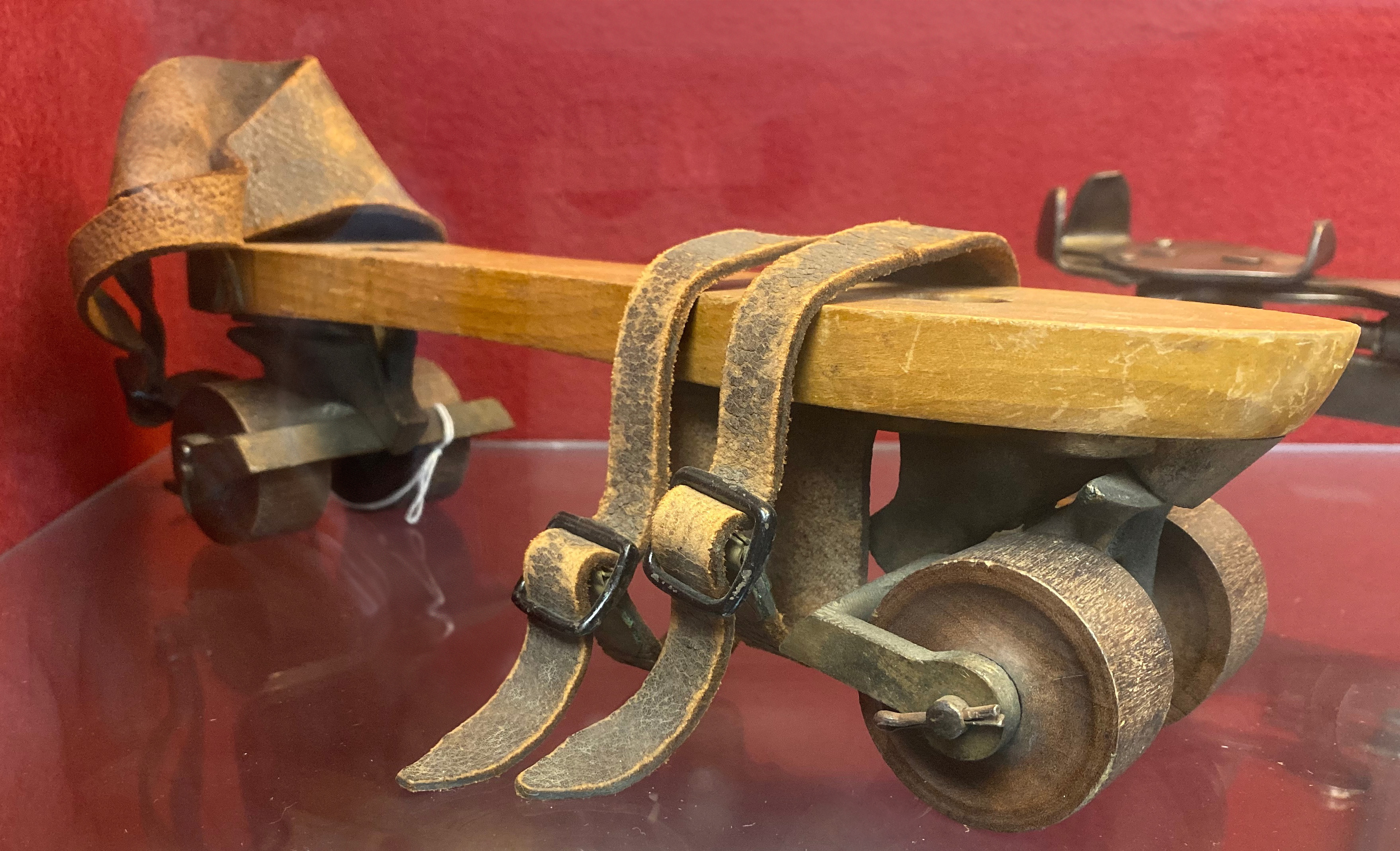
Plimpton prototype 1863-1866

In 1863, James Plimpton invented a roller skate with four wheels arranged in a two-by-two configuration, similar to a wagon, and added a clever mechanism for turning. It was the first double-row skate that allowed beginners to steer easily by simply leaning in the desired direction. Plimpton's invention sparked a rapid rise in roller skate popularity and spread across both sides of the Atlantic, creating a period of "rinkomania" during the 1860s and 1870s. His design also redefined the term roller skate, which no longer referred to all wheeled skates but became synonymous with the two-by-two Plimpton style.

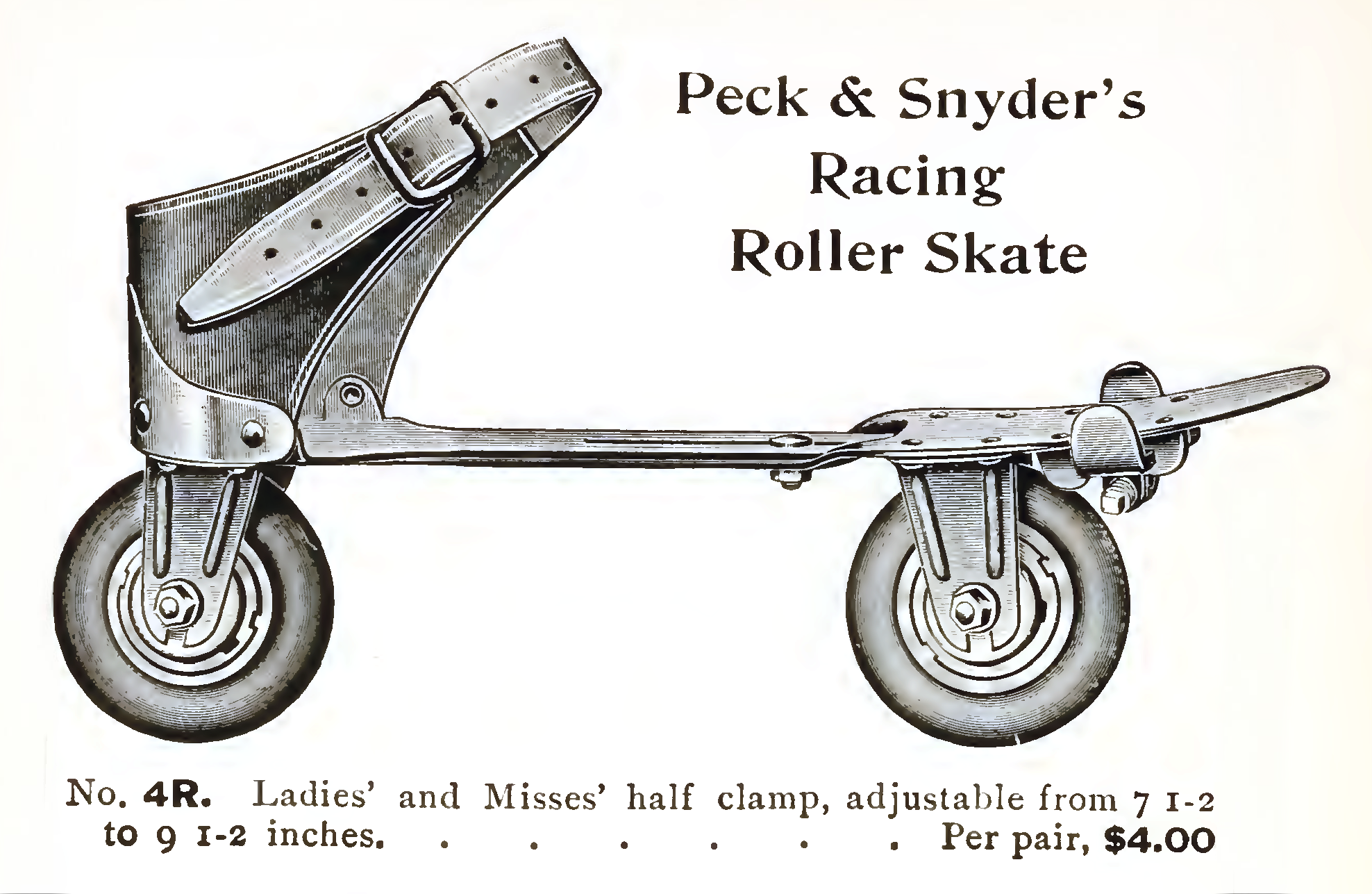
Racing Roller Skates - 1904

The development of precision ball bearings in the mid-19th century helped make bicycles more efficient and practical. By the 1880s, Plimpton-style roller skates similarly incorporated ball bearings into their wheel assemblies, making skates roll more efficiently. At the same time, manufacturers began operating skating rinks as promotional ventures from the 1880s through the 1910s. All of these further fueled the Plimpton skate craze.

Although Plimpton's roller skates took center stage, inventors and enterprises continued to introduce new roller skates with a single line of wheels between the 1870s and the 1910s. These models included features such as brakes, pneumatic tires, and foot stands placed below the center of the wheels.

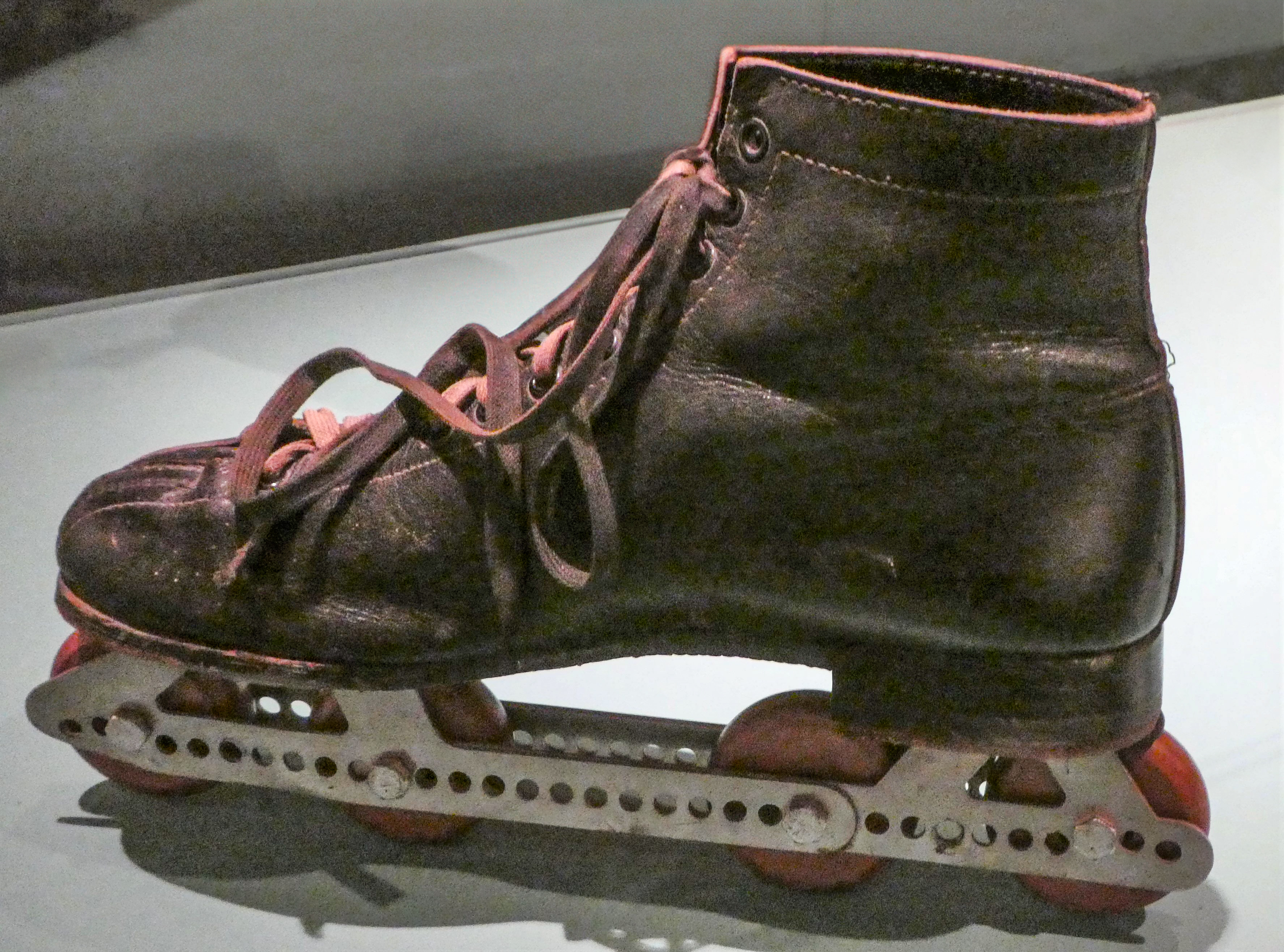
Chicago Roller-Blade - 1965

From the 1910s through the 1970s, many new variations of single-line wheeled skates were patented and manufactured. While still in the shadow of 2x2 roller skates, some models began to gain popularity among ice hockey players by the 1960s and 1970s, due to their better emulation of ice blades. In particular, off-season training skates used by USSR speed skaters inspired Gordon Ware of the Chicago Roller Skate Company to develop and patent a wheeled skate, which was sold through Montgomery Ward in 1965 under the name "Roller-Blade". In 1973, Ralph Backstrom promoted the Super Sport Skate, a joint venture with his friend Maury Silver, as an off-season training tool for hockey players. Both of these skate models became direct precursors to modern inline skates.

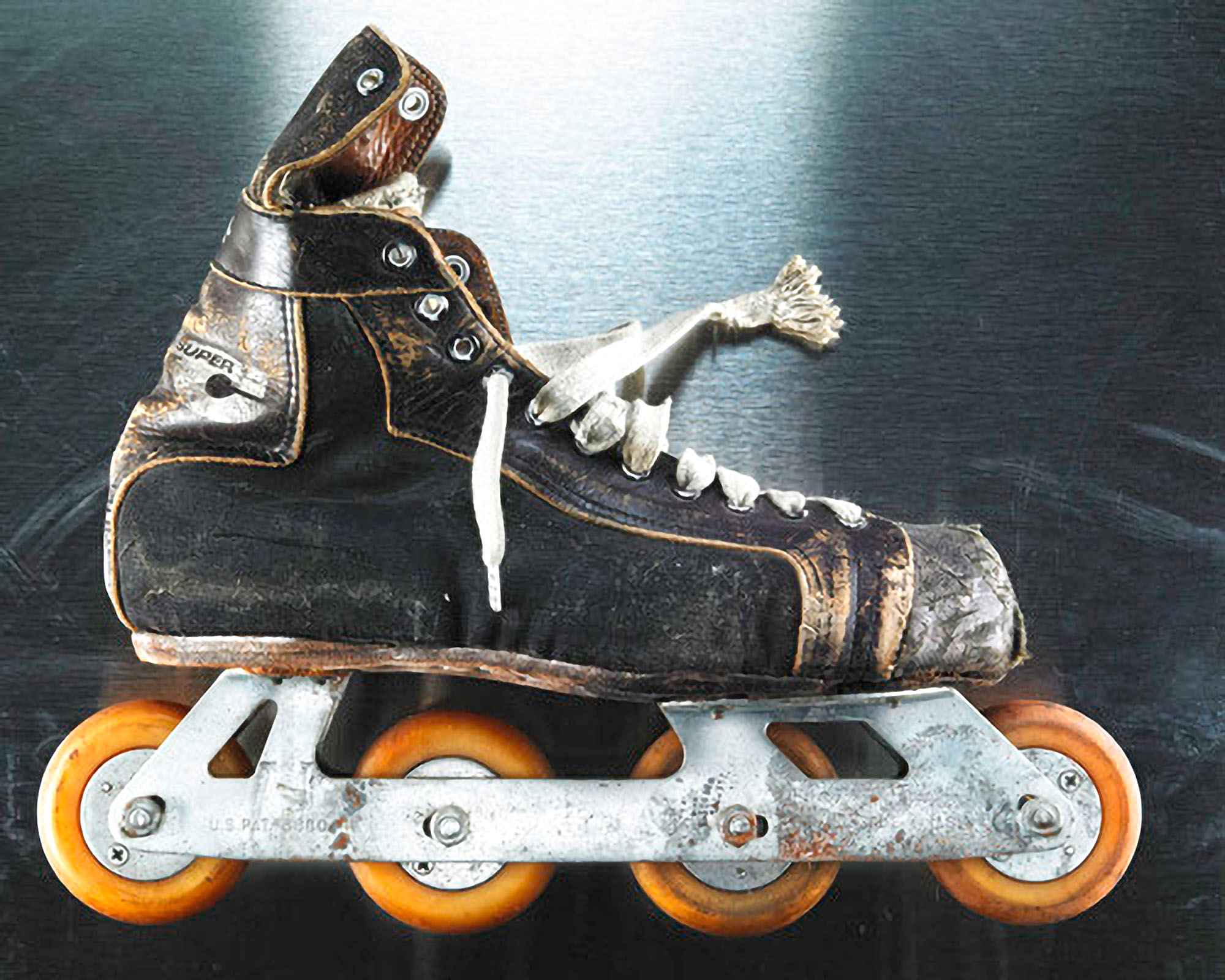
CCM Tacks boot riveted to Super Street Skate ca. 1980

In a related development, the ski boot manufacturer Lange introduced the first molded plastic ski boots with internal liners in the 1960s. In the 1970s, Lange entered the ice hockey market with similar hard plastic boots featuring hinged cuffs and achieved some success. Meanwhile, skateboarding reached new heights during the 1970s, thanks to the introduction of polyurethane wheels and their superior performance. The confluence of molded plastic boots with hinged cuffs, polyurethane wheels, Super Sport Skates, and the earlier Chicago Roller-Blade laid the foundation for the emergence of Rollerblade in the 1980s and its widespread appeal among the general public.

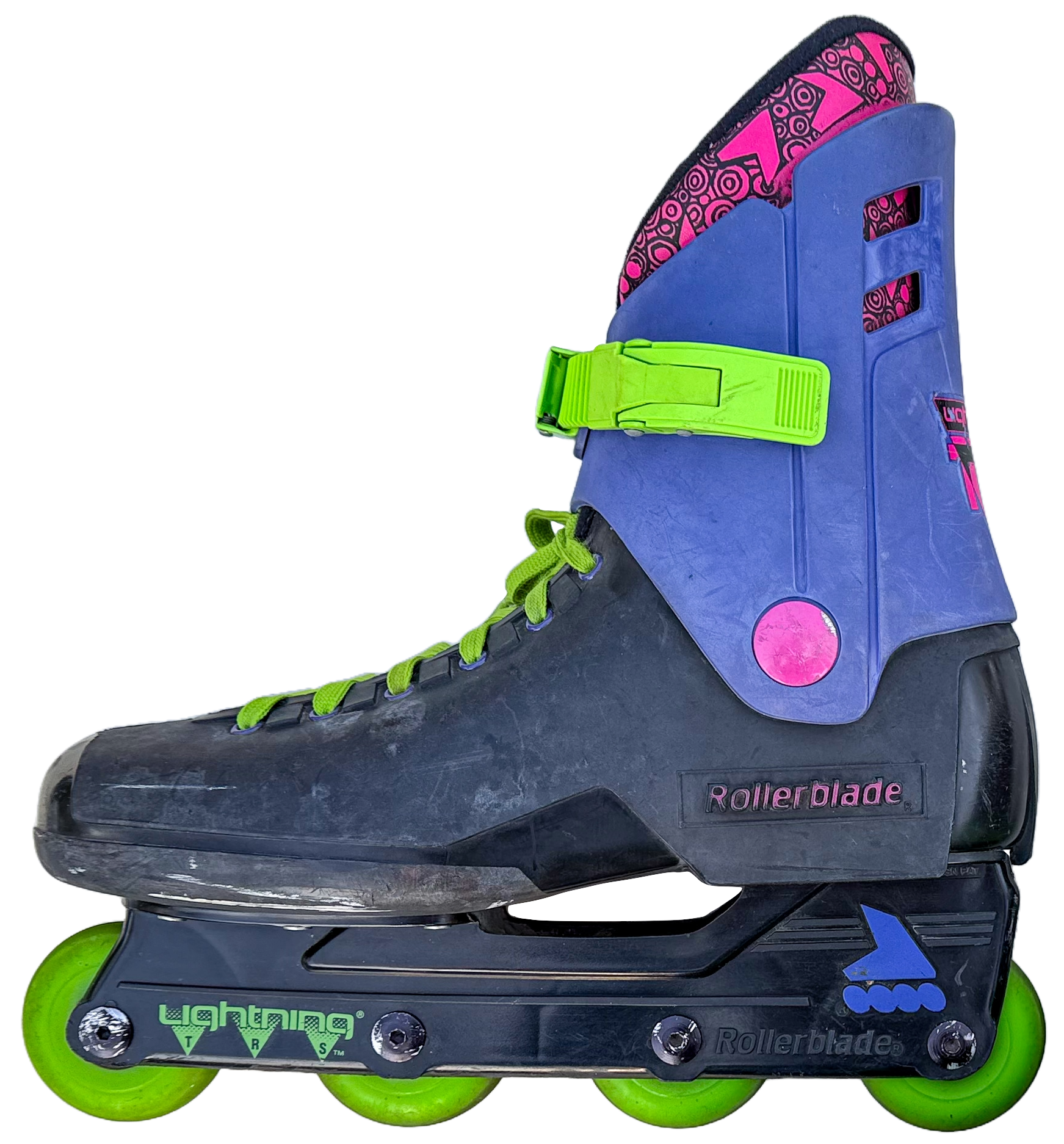
Lightning TRS from Rollerblade - 1988

In 1979, Scott Olson, a hockey player from Minneapolis, discovered the Super Sport Skate. He began selling them to local hockey players as a licensed distributor and soon started modifying them. Olson, his brothers, and his friends replaced the stock boots with customers' old hockey boots and swapped out the original wheels for polyurethane ones. Through further tinkering, prototyping and road testing everywhere he could, Olson eventually arrived at a skate design with an adjustable/expandable frame, polyurethane wheels and double ball bearings. The skate rolled faster, and remained more reliable on road surfaces. However, a patent search revealed that the Chicago Roller-Blade already covered many of these features. In 1981, Olson persuaded the Chicago Roller Skate Company to transfer the patent to him in exchange for a share of future profits.

Thus began the modern history of inline skates, with Olson's company eventually becoming known as Rollerblade, Inc. by around 1988. The registered trademark "Rollerblade" became so well known that it entered common usage as a generic trademark. Around this time, the company began promoting the term "in-line" skating in an effort to prevent "rollerblading" from becoming a verb. The campaign proved effective, as media outlets, newspapers, and competitors adopted "in-line skating" as the preferred term by 1990. The phrase was soon shortened to "inline", the name by which these skates are known today.

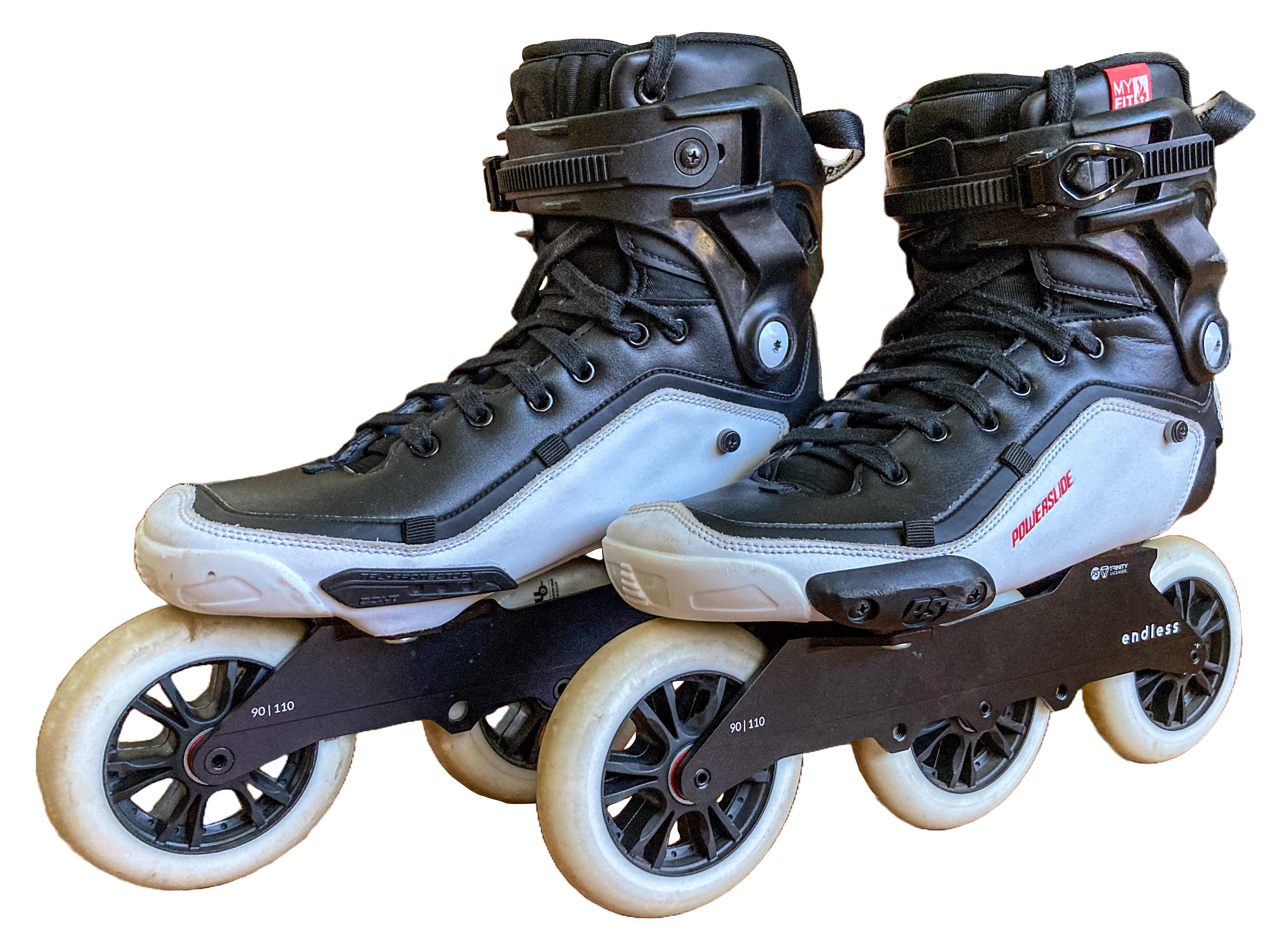
Urban inline skates - 2024

Modern inline skates became practical for mass production and appealing as a recreational activity once key technologies came together. These included polyurethane wheels, ISO 608 standard ball bearings, and molded plastic boots. These skates incorporate double ball bearings with dual-purpose axles from Chomin Harry (1925), single-piece frames from Christian Siffert (1938), adjustable wheel rockering from Gordon Ware (1966), single-unit boot/frame, longer frames and larger wheels from Maury Silver (1975), plus additional innovations.

By the 21st century, inline skates have diversified into many forms to suit a wide range of inline skating activities and sports. These include recreational skating, urban skating, roller hockey, street hockey, speed skating, slalom skating, aggressive skating, vert skating, and artistic inline skating.

== Wheeled skates ==
The history of inline skates traces back to the origin of ice skates in prehistoric times, with runners made from animal bones. Steel blades eventually replaced bone runners in the 13th century, with the Dutch sharpening blade edges for better purchase on ice for propulsion. Since then, enterprising inventors have attempted to make boots that could similarly glide on non-ice surfaces, with wheels.

In 1760, John Joseph Merlin, a renowned clock-maker, musical-instrument maker and inventor from Belgium, experimented in London with "skaites" that "ran on wheels". These were the first recorded wheeled skates. Written records left no drawings or descriptions of wheel configurations, however.

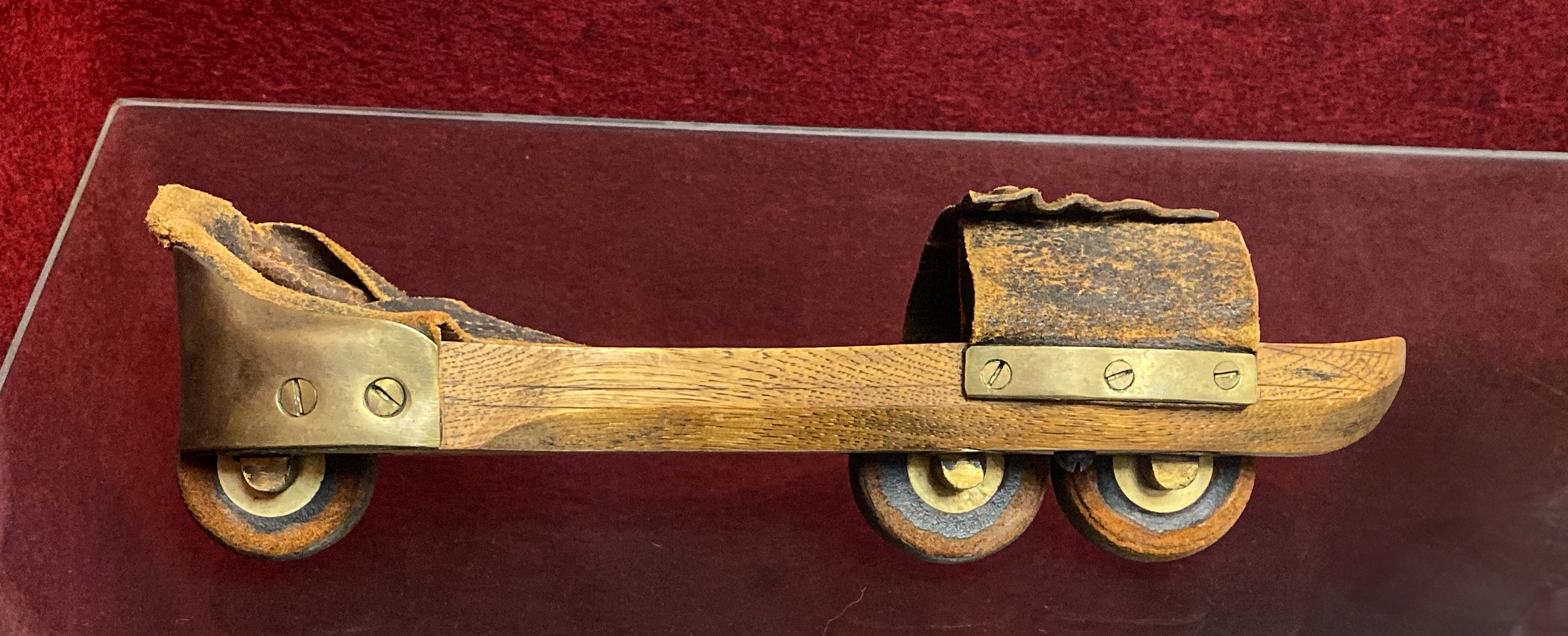
First patented wheeled skate - 1819

In 1819, Charles-Louis Petibled from France filed the first known patent on wheeled skates. Three wheels in a single line, mimicking a steel blade, were integrated into a wooden foot stand with leather straps. Two wheels sat under the ball of the foot, while one wheel was positioned under the heel. A copy of Petibled's wheeled skates is on display at the National Museum of Roller Skating, in Lincoln, Nebraska, USA.

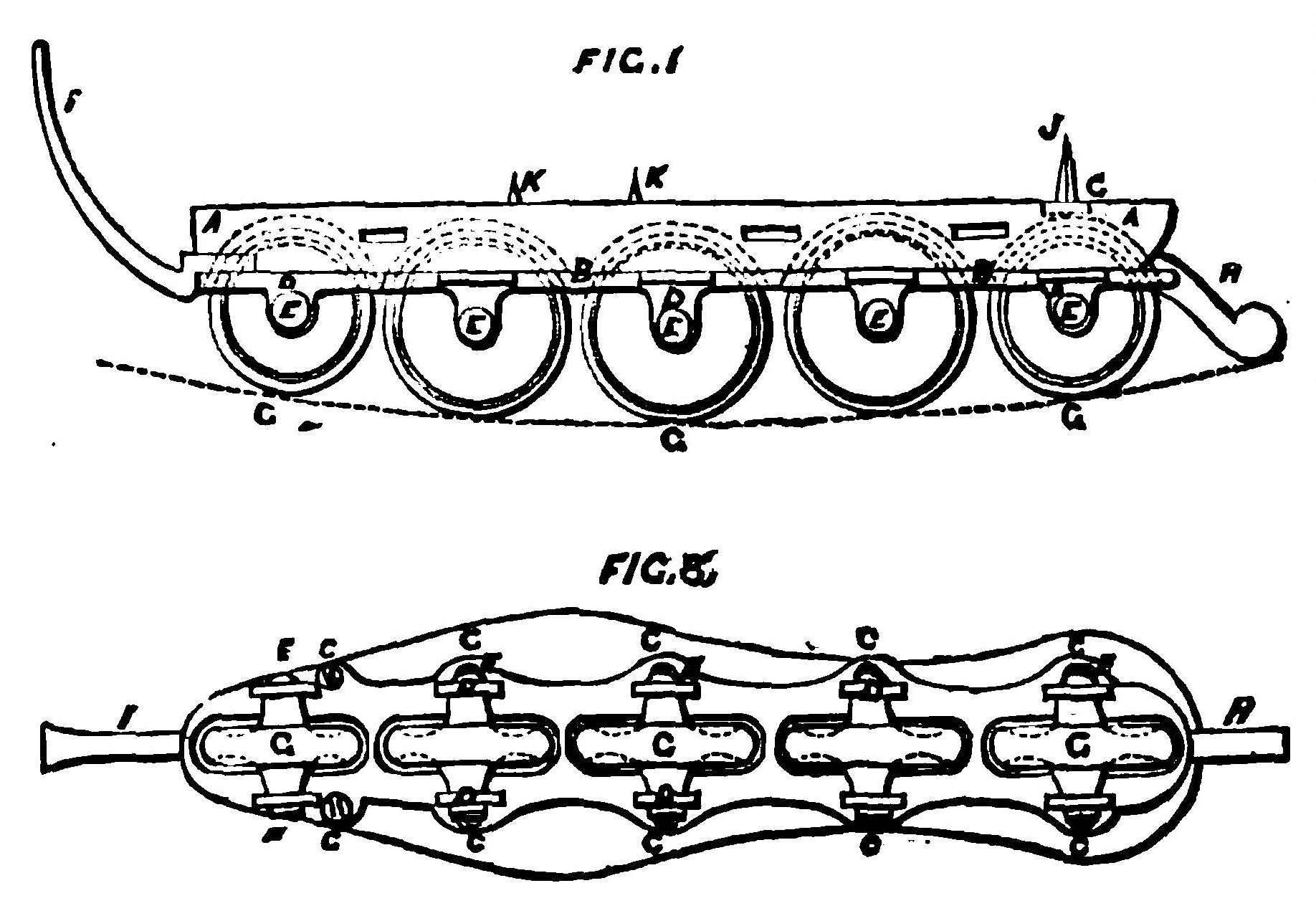
5-wheel Volito skate - 1823

In 1823, Robert John Tyers from London was granted a patent for his skates with five wheels in a single line, again mimicking a steel blade. The main body of the skate is called the stock (or foot stand), and is meant to be attached to the bottom of a shoe. A frame with two wheel-mounting sides is secured to the stock. This skate employs a large wheel in the middle, and progressively smaller ones towards the front and the rear, creating a rockered wheel setup that allows skaters to execute turns more easily.

This novelty skate was popularized in London as "Volito" (to fly about, in Latin). A hand-colored print from 1829 in the British Museum depicts a satirical scene where men wearing Volito skates escape chase by men on boots. The National Museum of American History has a Volito skate in its collections.

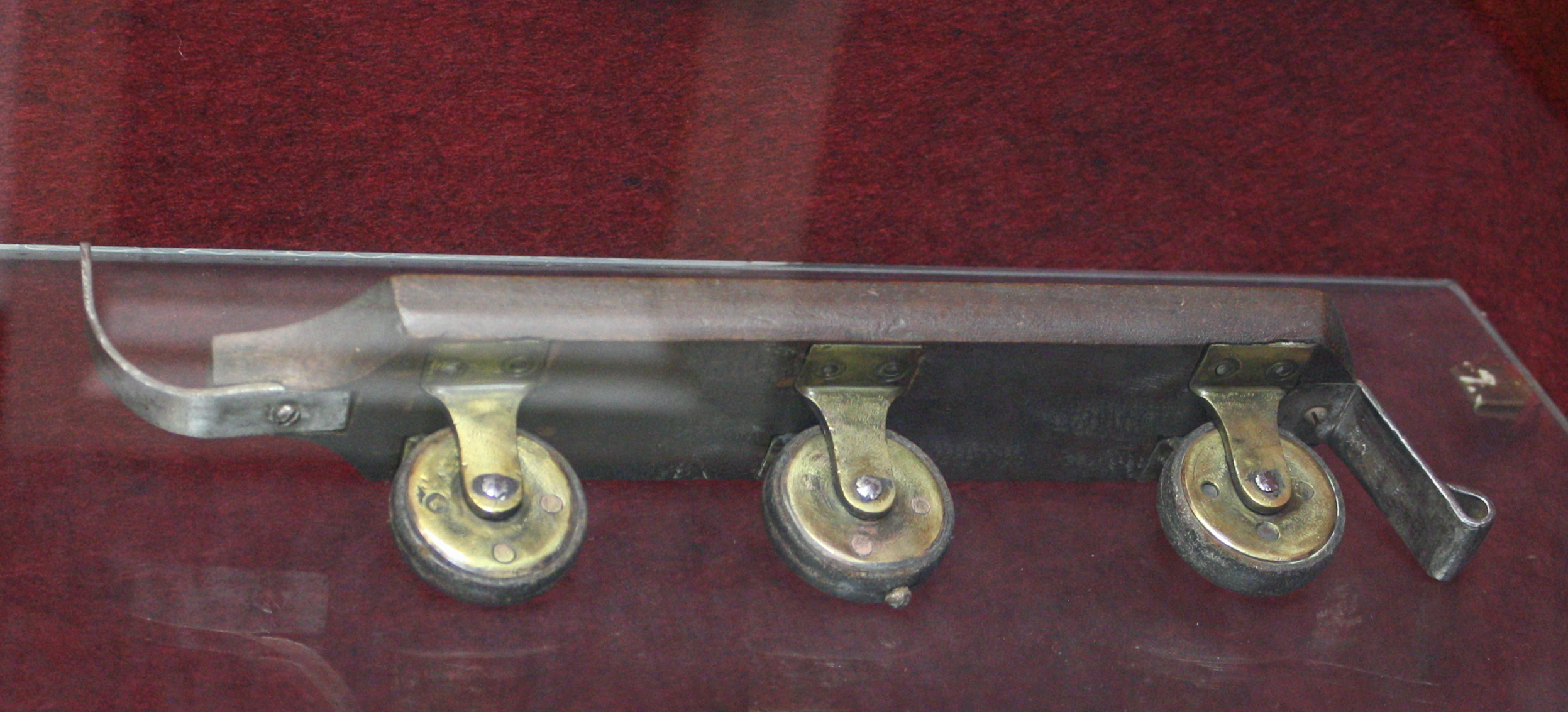
Garcin's skate - 1828

Robert Tyers was not the only inventor inspired by Petibled to make their own wheeled skates. Many inventors followed suit in the wake of the Petibled skate, including Spence, Lohner and Legrand. Yet another inventor was the famous ice skater Jean Garcin. He filed his own skate patent in 1828, named the Cingar skate, an anagram of his name. This skate, however, was technically similar to Petibled's patent. As a result, Petibled was able to render null and void Garcin's patent in 1832.

Up to this point in history, "roller skates" as a term was not yet used. Inventors simply referred to their contraptions as wheeled alternatives to ice skates. All known novelty skates had wheels aligned in a single line. Skates were simply assumed to have a single runner, whether a steel blade on an ice skate, or a row of wheels on a wheeled skate. This state of affairs continued through 1860. (Note: Henry Pennie patented in 1861 the first skate with two parallel rows of wheels, setting his skate apart from previous wheeled skates with a single row of wheels.)

== Roller skates ==
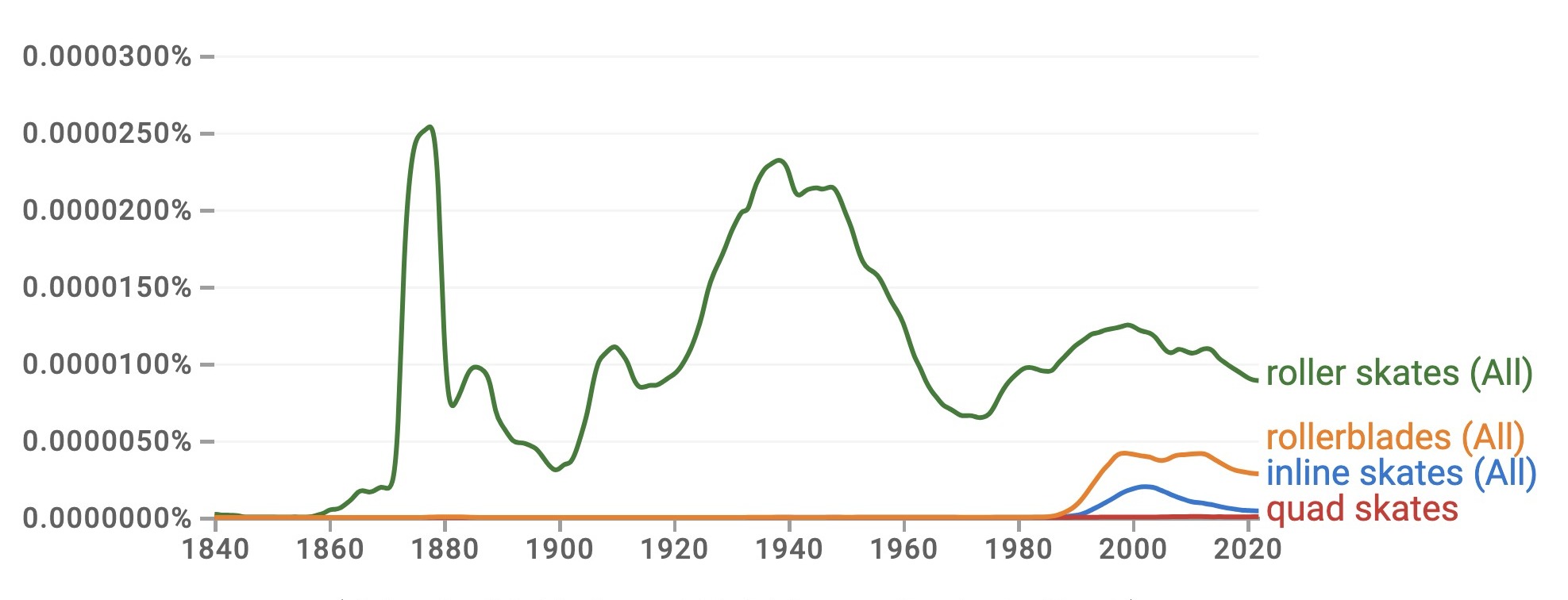
Usage stats of various skating terms including "roller skates", before and after 1860

Around 1860, wheeled skates started to become more popular. Patents on a wide variety of wheeled skates were issued. The configuration of wheels started to depart from previous single-line arrangements. Many of these early patents were titled "roller-skate" or "parlor skate". Indeed, the Oxford English Dictionary dates the earliest printed use of the noun roller skate to 1860. Then, starting in 1870, the popularity of roller skates skyrocketed. Within a decade the term "roller skates" entered the popular lexicon.

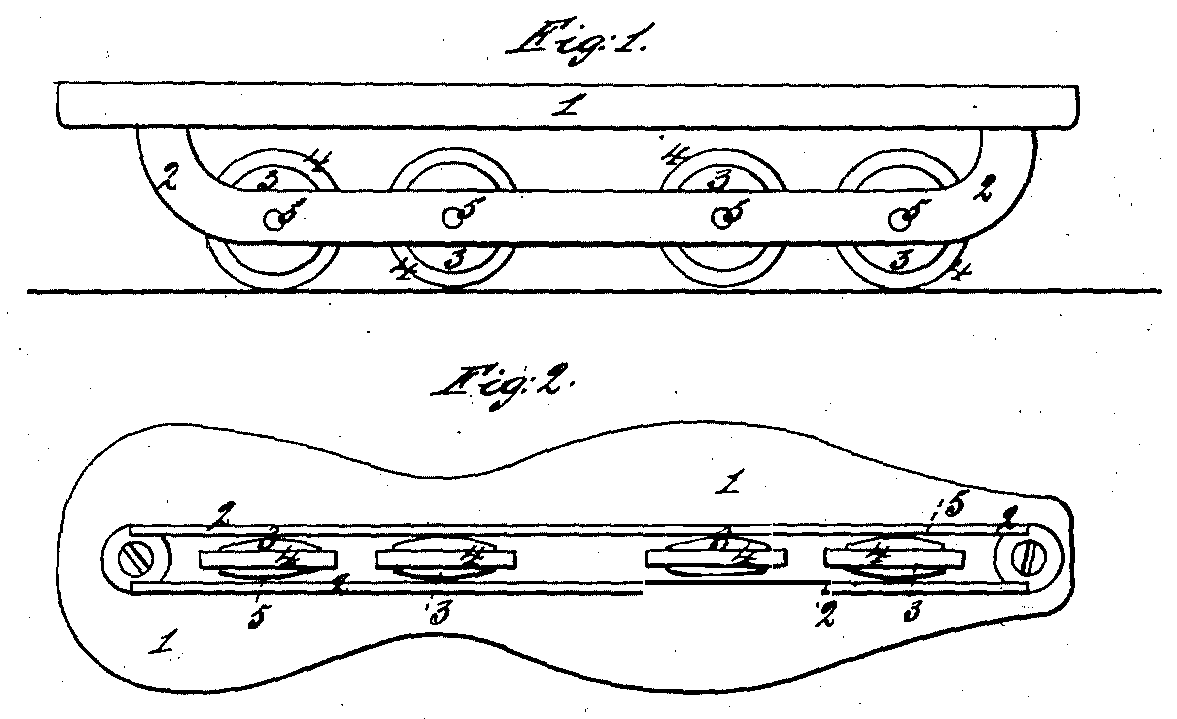
Shaler skates w. rubber rings - 1860

In 1860, the US Patent Office granted Reuben Shaler the first US patent on roller skates, titled "Wheel-Skate", with an accompanying drawing labeled "Parlor Skate". The four rollers (wheels) formed a straight line, and were mounted by pins on two side pieces of a hanger that we would now recognize as a frame of a modern-day inline skate. His key innovation was a flexible rubber ring he mounted on each of the four metal roller cores. This allowed his roller skates to gain better purchase on carpeted floors.

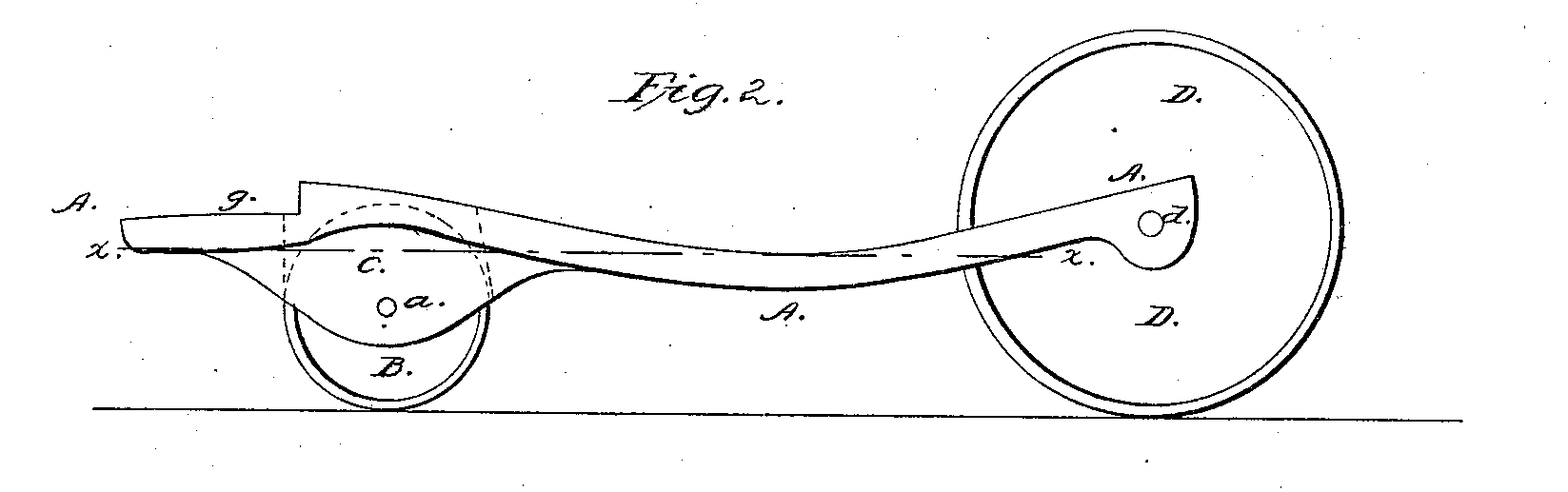
2-wheel Anderson skate - 1861

In 1861, Albert Anderson was granted a US patent on "Improvement in roller-skates". The accompanying drawings titled "Parlor Skate" showed a two-wheeled skate, with a small wheel under the heel, and a much larger wheel in front of the toes, reminiscent of penny-farthing bikes. The large front wheel overcomes oncoming obstacles, preventing a skater from falling forward. The stock (or foot stand) is inclined forward, with a raised heel section. This is not dissimilar to how some modern-day hockey, freestyle and speed skates pitch a player leaning forward by default, giving a skater greater stability and stronger strokes.

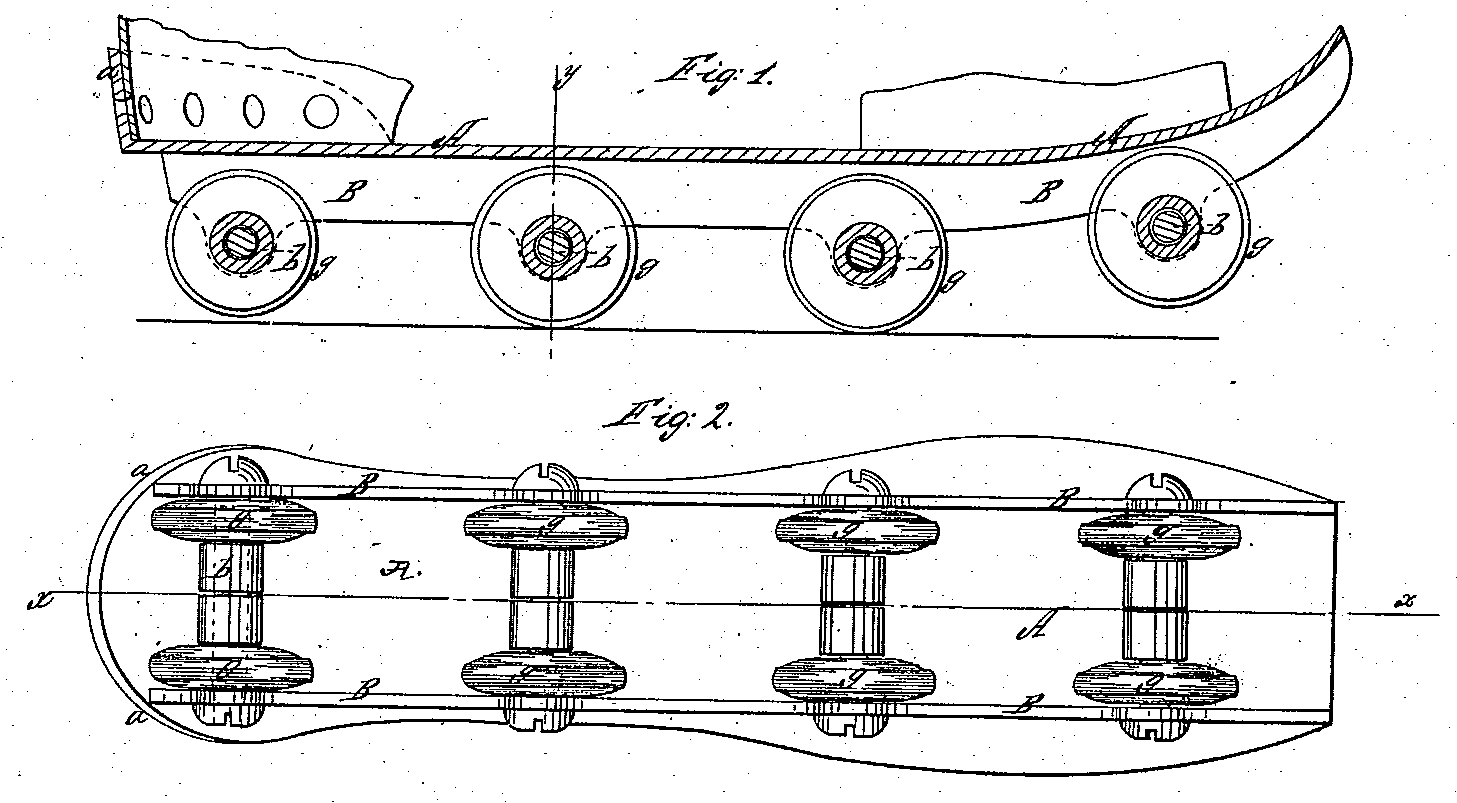
4x2 Pennie skate - 1861

In 1861, Henry Pennie was granted a US patent titled "Roller-skate". Its drawing, titled "Parlor Skate" showed a stock supported by two rows of wheels, with 4 wheels on each row, totaling 8 wheels per skate. In the patent specification, Pennie explained that his key innovation was the two rows of wheels. This set his skates apart from all previous roller skates that attempted to emulate ice skates with a single, centered runner. Pennie reasoned that two rows of wheels provided increased support area for better balance, without materially incurring greater friction. Beginners would learn with two rows of wheels, for a more balanced footing. Skillful skaters would move the two rows of wheels increasingly closer to each other, using different widths of washers as spacers, until they graduated to a single row of wheels. Pennie's skate, too, had two side plates secured to the stock, forming what continues to be known as a "frame" today.

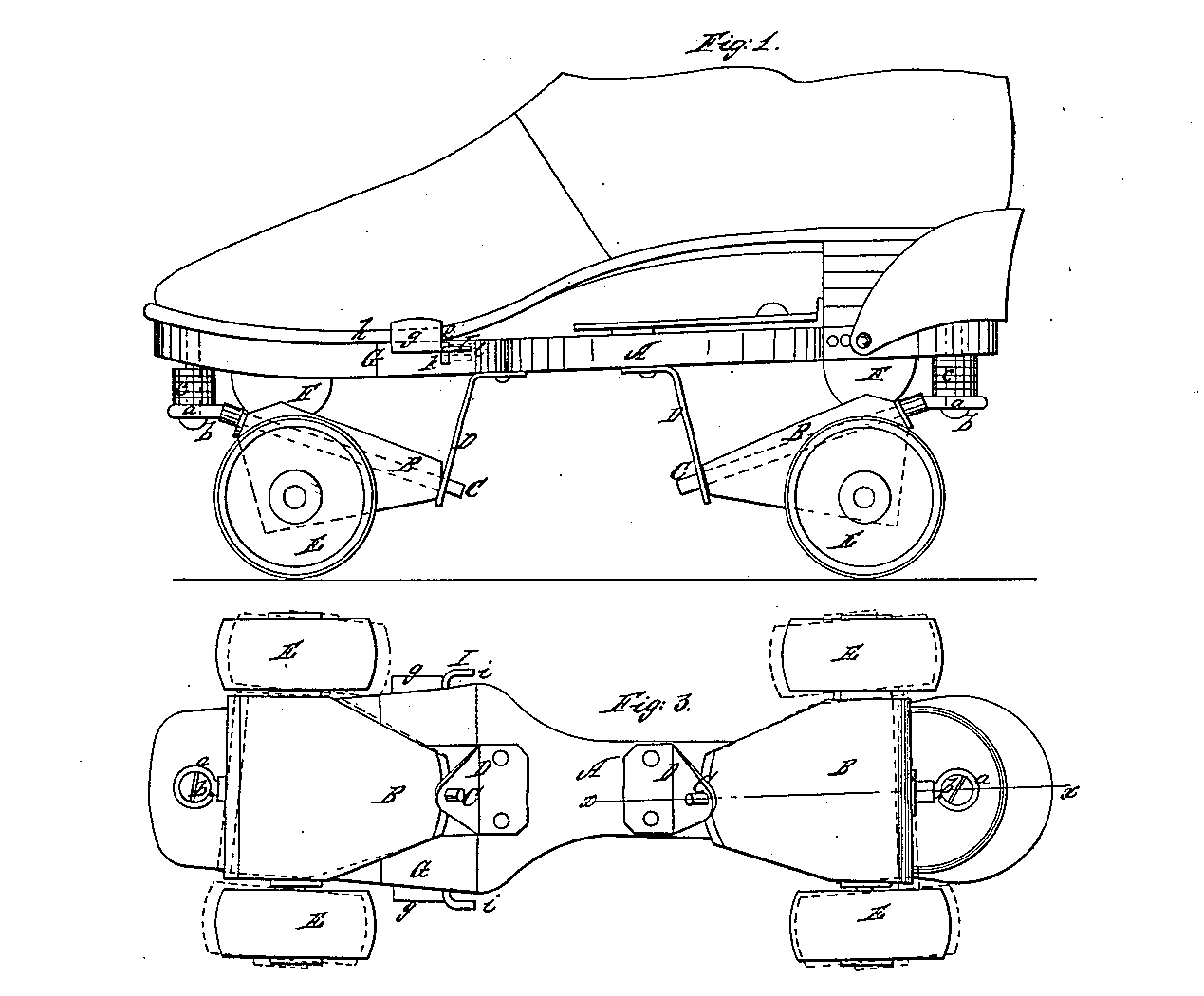
2x2 Plimpton skate - 1863

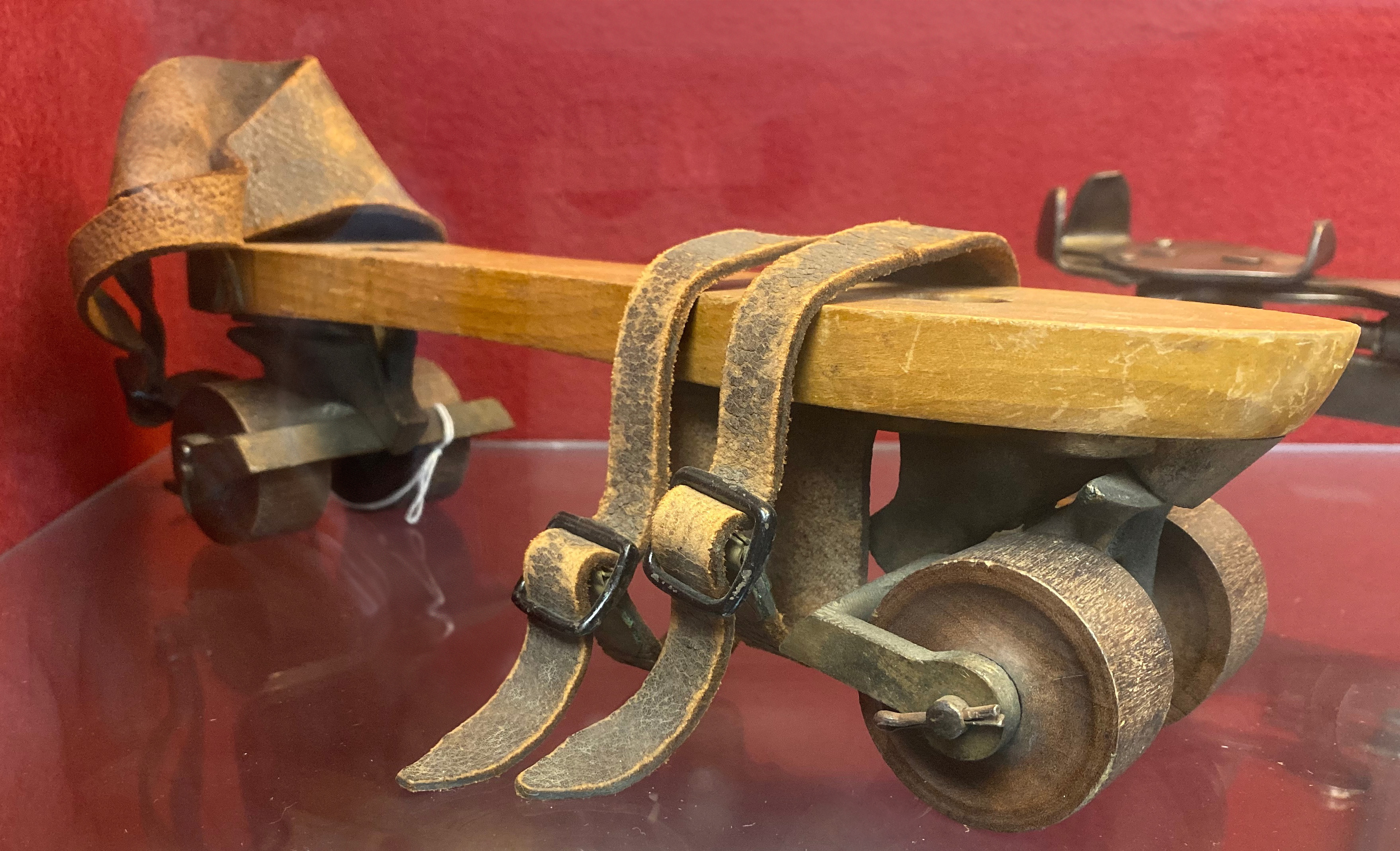
Plimpton prototype 1863-1866

In 1863, James Plimpton patented an "improvement in skates" consisting of a stock with four wheels arranged in a two-by-two configuration like a wagon. This was not the first roller skate with two rows of skates, but it was the first double-row skate that could be easily turned by a beginner. Plimpton's key innovation was a mechanism that allowed a skater to turn a skate by simply leaning towards the desired direction. The mechanism converted rocking and canting motions of the skate platform (stock) into movements of the two wheel axles. These axles in turn steered all four wheel into the right orientations for the turn.

Plimpton opened roller skating rinks and aggressively promoted this new sport of roller skating. His wheel-steering invention, together with his business acumen, spread his roller skates far and wide, resulting in a "rinkomania" in the 1860s and 1870s. The editors of the 1876 series of "Historical Notes on Roller Skates" (published in The Engineer) marveled at the number of roller skate patents that resulted from the rinkomania. They compiled a table of roller skate patents issued in Europe and America from 1819 through 1876, showing an exponential growth starting with Plimpton's 1863 invention. Plimpton's skates forever changed the meaning of "roller skates". For the next century, the term "roller skates" no longer referred to all wheeled skates. It became synonymous with the two-by-two Plimpton-style skates, particularly to the masses. (Note: Vandervell and Witham's 1880 book on figure skating not only covered ice skating, but dedicated a full chapter 5, named "Roller-Skating", to Plimpton's roller skates and to equivalencies of outside edges and club figures between his roller skates and ice skates. By 1880, the term "roller skates" were synonymous with Plimpton skates.)

== Using ball bearings ==
Skates became more practical with the adoption of ball bearings in the wheel assembly. This directly followed the development of precision ball bearings in the 1850s, and the application of ball bearings in bicycles by Albert Louis Thirion in 1862 in England. Ball bearings reduced bearing friction to as little as 10% of former values, greatly improving top speeds of bicycle racers in Europe.

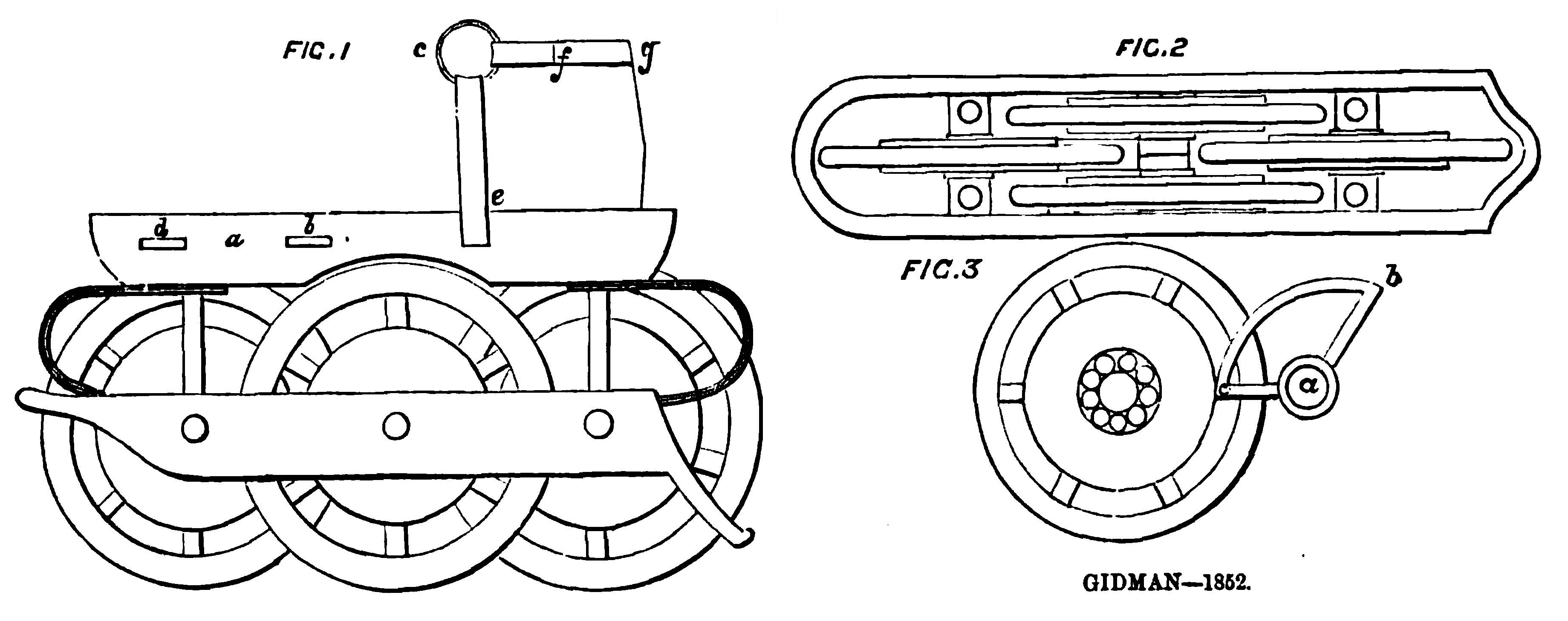
Gidman skate with bearings - 1852

In 1852, Joseph Gidman filed a provisional patent application titled "A skate", where he described a skate with a front wheel, a rear wheel, and two side wheels mounted mid-section. Instead of constructing a wheel with a solid nave, Gidman inserted rollers between a wheel and its axle, effectively applying roller bearings to skate wheels. But Gidman was ahead of his time. He spent 30 years trying to get roller skates with roller bearings mass-produced, with little success.

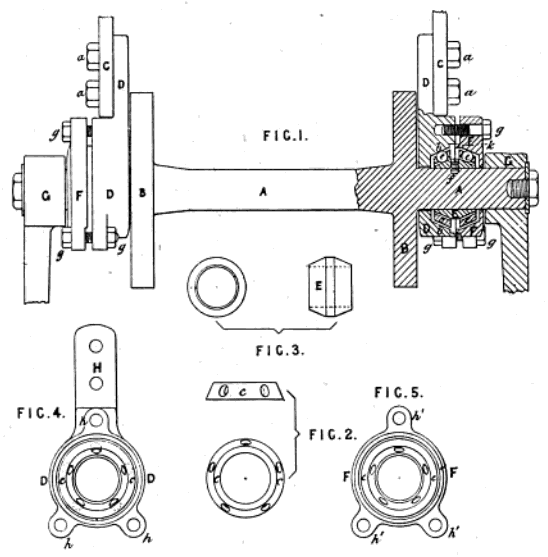
Ball bearings in bikes - Hughes 1877

In 1876, William Bown's provisional patent application was allowed, titled "Improvements in the construction of wheels or rollers for roller skates and for other purposes". Bown placed a felt ring, lubricated with oil, between a wheel and its axle to attempt to reduce friction. But this was not substantially more effective, and required constant oil refills.

In 1877, Joseph Henry Hughes' provisional patent application was allowed, titled "Improvements in the bearings of bicycles and velocipedes or carriages". Hughes, a local of Birmingham, described a ball bearing race for bicycle and carriage wheels which allowed for initial adjustment of the system to ensure optimal contact between components, and for subsequent adjustments to compensate for component wear from use. As a successful owner of Bown Manufacturing Company, William Bown persuaded Hughes to sell rights to this patent to him, and to join him on further bearing innovations for the next decade. This led to the successful Aeolus brand of ball bearings, used in the first ball-race-pedals and wheel bearings for bicycles and carriage wheels. Similar ball bearings were subsequently adopted for use on roller skates.

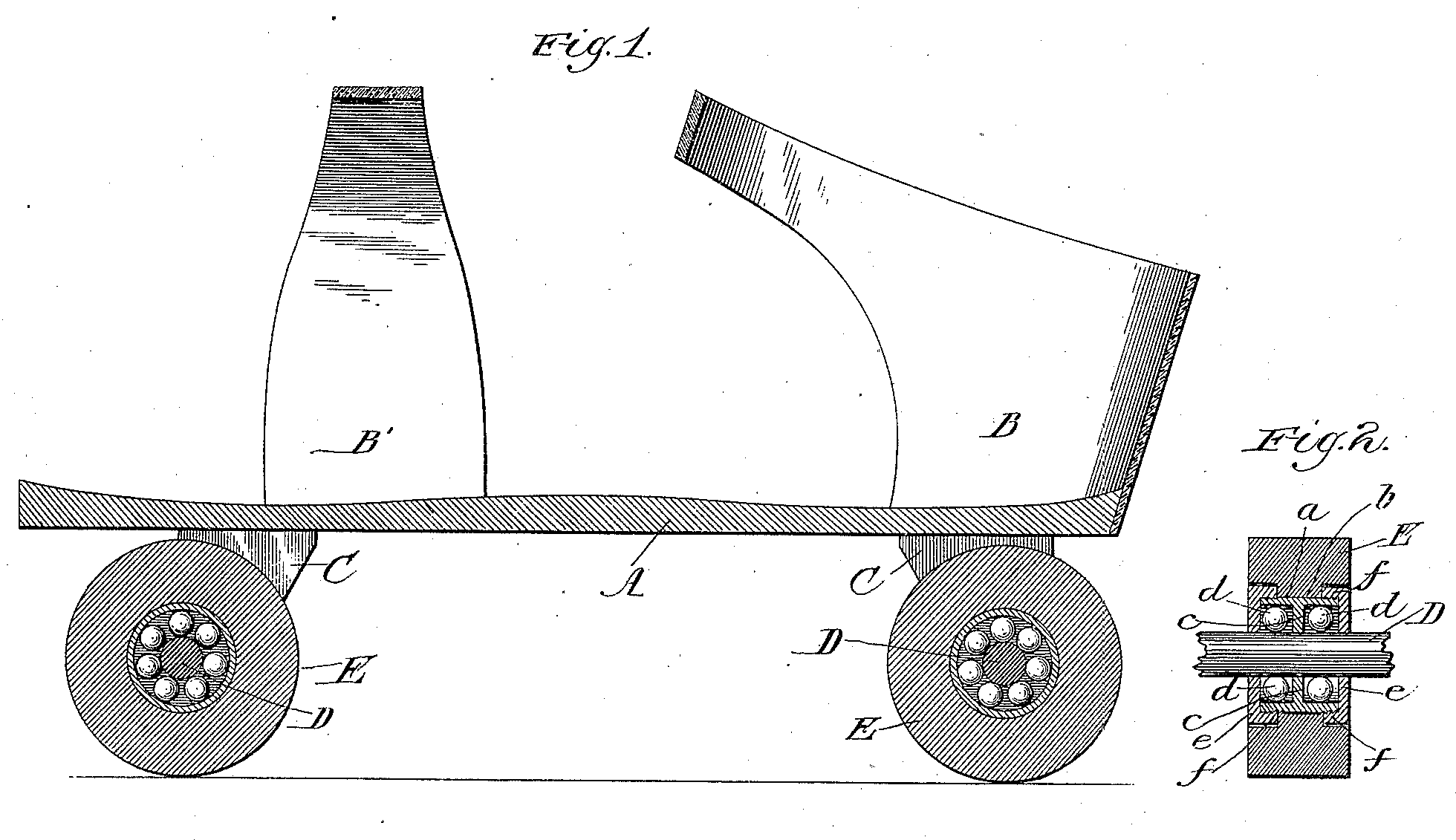
Ball bearings in skates - Richardson 1884

In 1884, two US patents claiming the use of ball bearings in roller skates were issued one after the other. George Burton filed on August 17, 1883, and was granted a patent on November 11, 1884. Levant Marvin Richardson filed on August 6, 1884, and was granted a patent on December 9, 1884. Richardson was more successful in marketing his invention, eventually starting and growing Richardson Ball-Bearing Skate Company to make these skates.

Skates equipped with ball bearings further fueled the Plimpton 2x2 skate craze. Skate manufacturers operated rinks to promote roller skating during the boom period from 1880s through 1910s. Skates made for rink use were referred to as parlor skates or club skates. By 1910, Richardson Roller Skate Company competed with mainstream brands including Henley Roller Skates, Winslow's Skates, Baltimore Skate MFG Co, and Chicago Roller Skate Company.

== After Plimpton ==
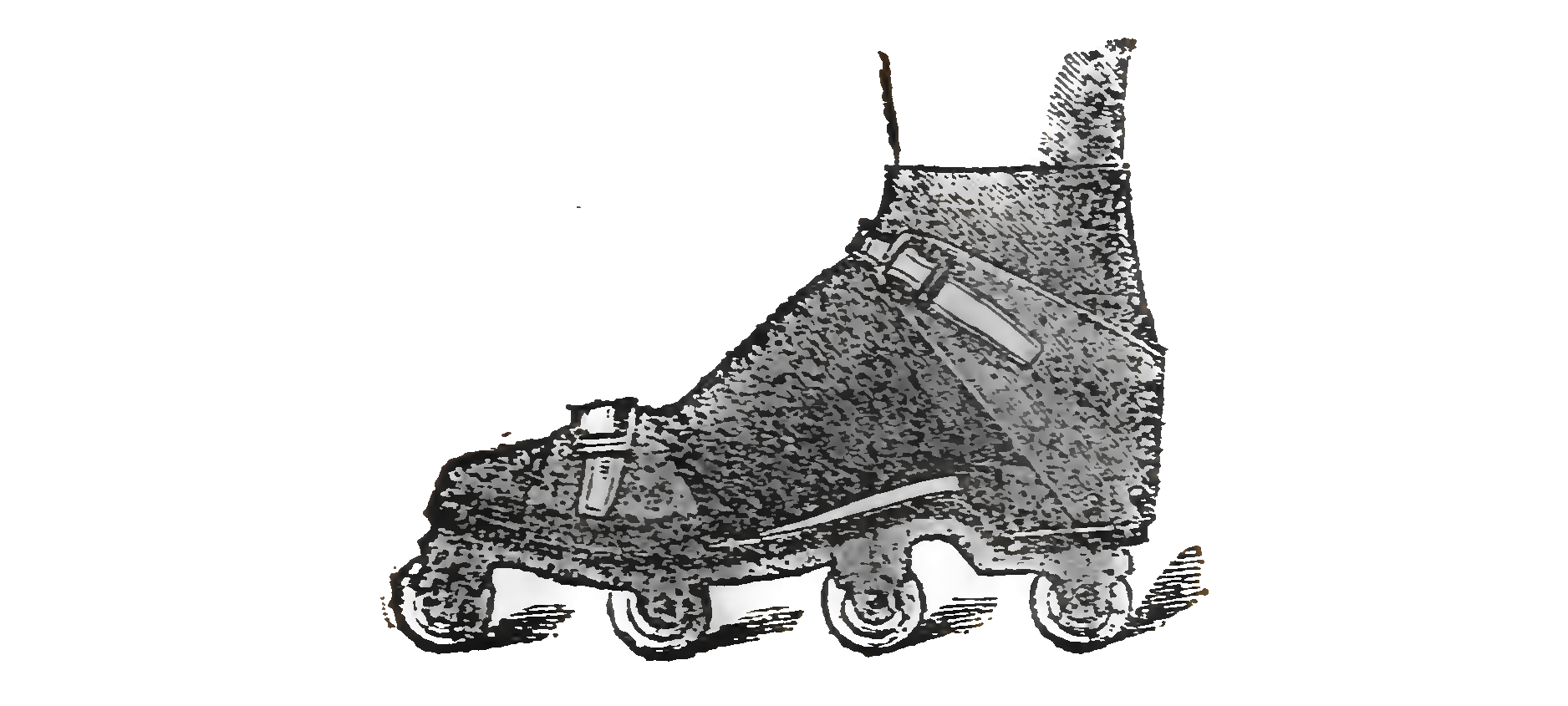
Peck & Snynder - 1873

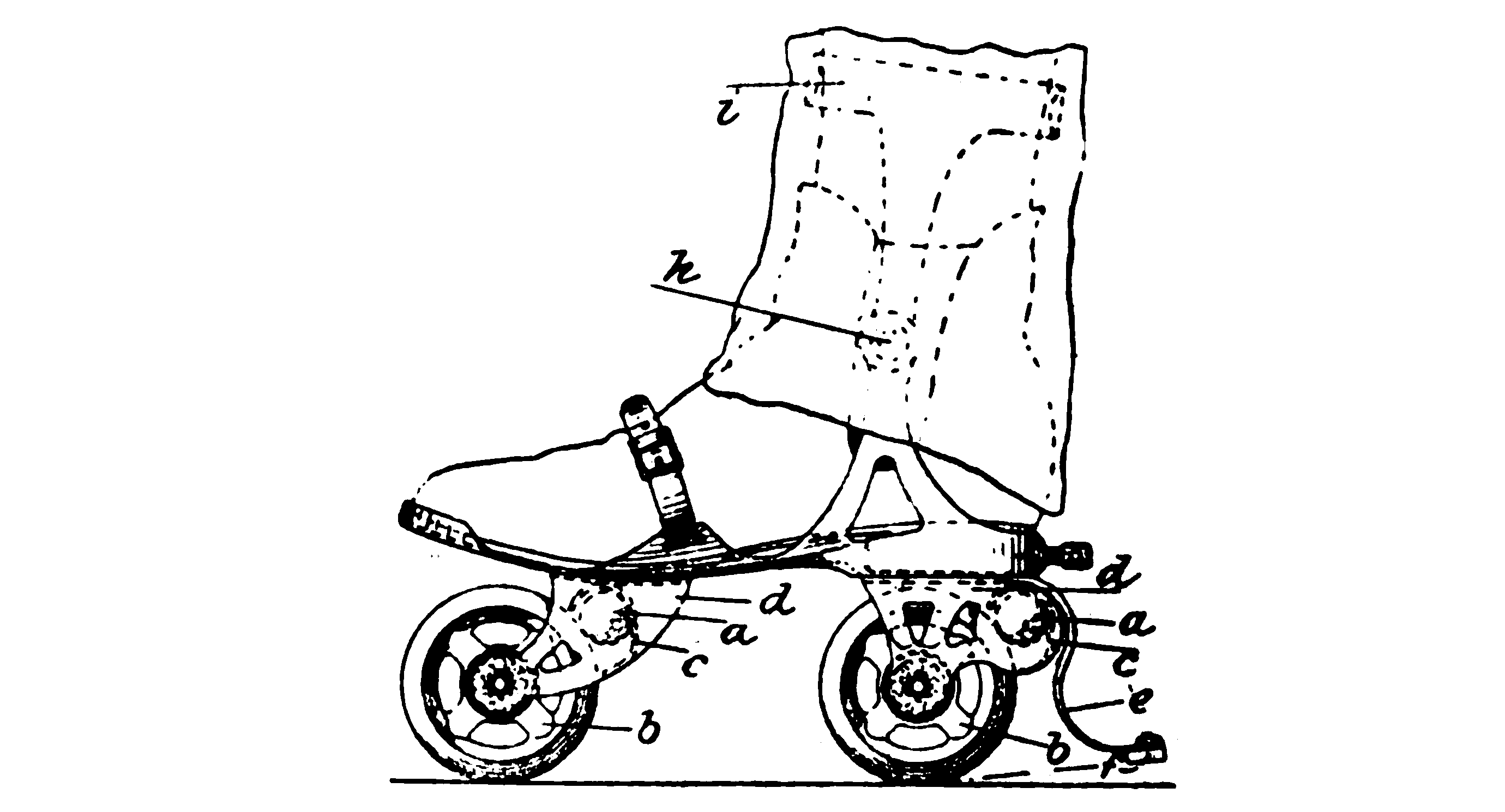
Skate brake - Edwards 1893

Plimpton's two-by-two roller skates took the limelight starting in 1863 and held it for more than a century. But inventors and enterprises continued to bring new roller skates with a single line of wheels to the market, under Plimpton's shadow. For instance, in 1873, Peck & Snyder advertised "parlor or floor skates" with 4 rubber wheels in a single line. These skates had not yet incorporated ball bearings. They closely resembled skates advertised in 1861, which were based on Reuben Shaler's 1860 patent.

Early roller skaters were preoccupied with avoiding rolling backward. E. Edwards and H. Koerner patented heel brakes in 1893 that prevented a single-line roller skate from rolling backward. To brake, a rubber ball was jammed against a rear wheel covered with rubber tire. This skate did not claim its straps, ankle support, or two-wheel configuration, as those preexisted.

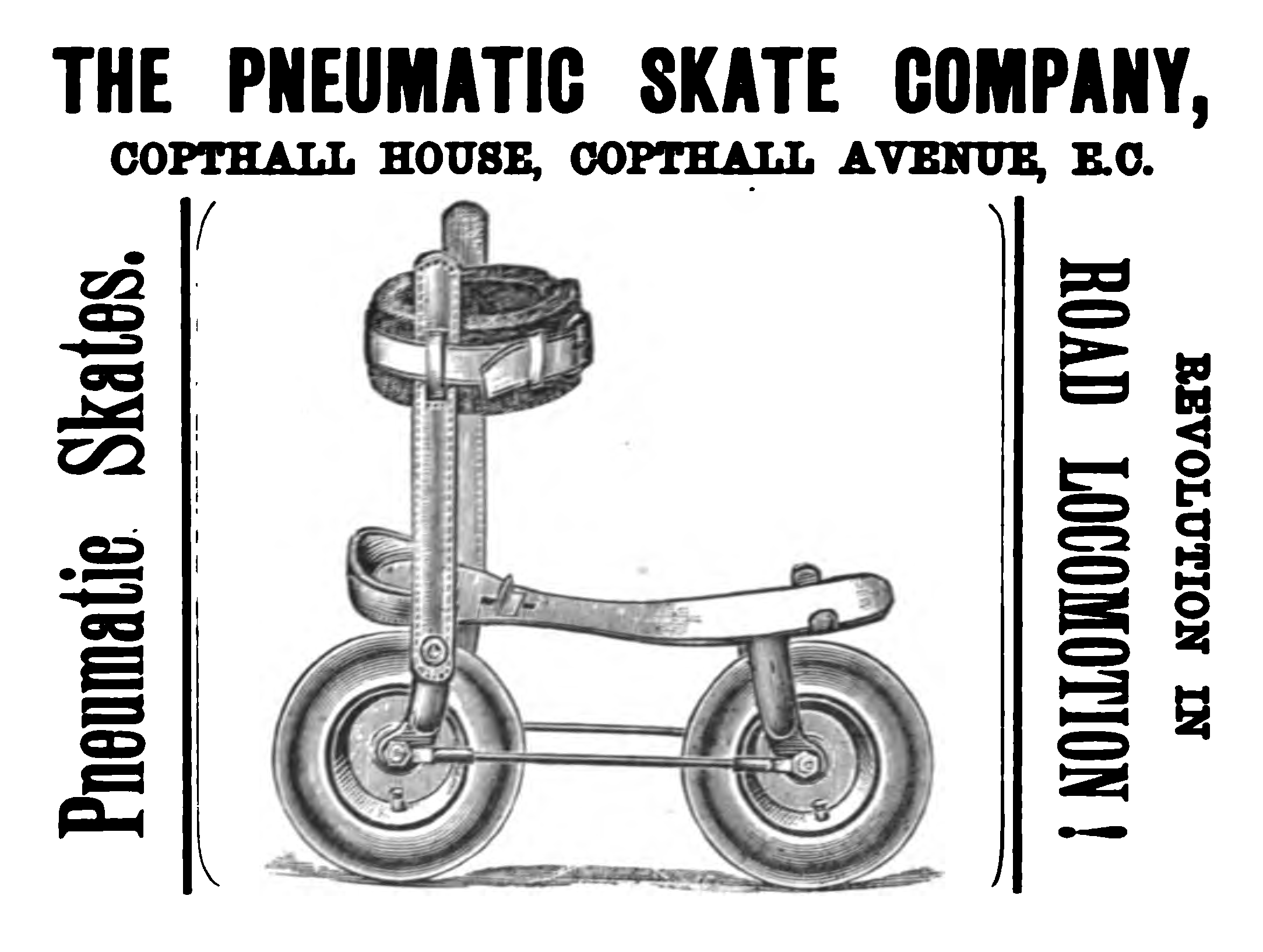
Pneumatic road skate - 1895

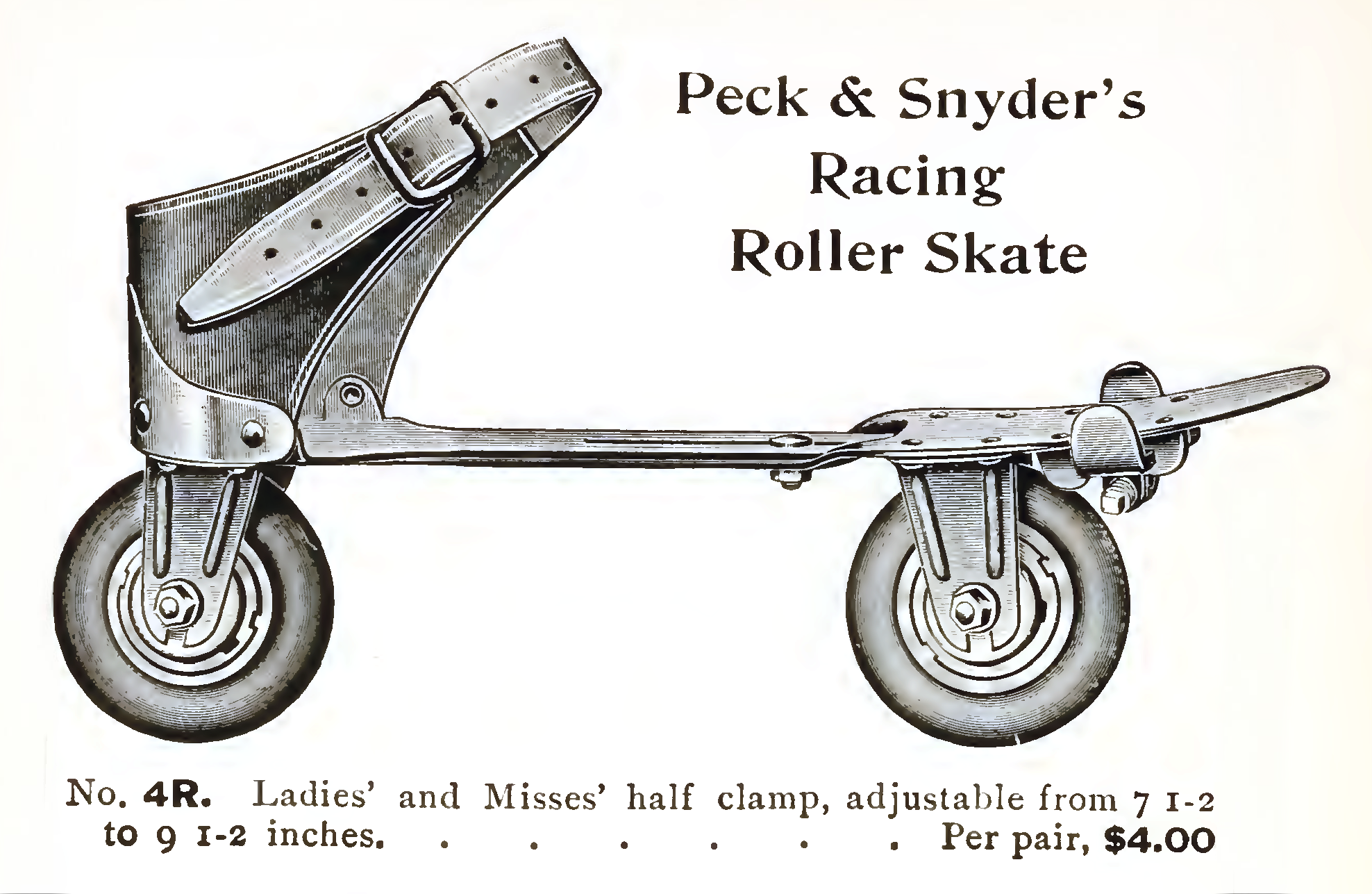
Racing Roller Skates - 1904

Many single-line roller skates during this period had two wheels. In 1895, the Pneumatic Road Skate Company in London took out a full-page advertisement in the book Figure and Fancy Skating, showing a road skate with two wheels, each covered in hollow rubber tires modeled after bicycle tires. This skate closely resembled the skate shown in the Edwards/Koerner patent. Both provided similar ankle support that was popular at the time. These single-line skates were purported to allow easy turning of skates, without needing the rocking and canting mechanism from Plimpton's roller skates. They were advertised as "road" skates with ball bearings, and were hyped as having great military utilities for moving troops. The company performed a public demonstration before its public offering.

Across the Atlantic Ocean in America in 1904, Peck & Snyder Sporting Goods, which was acquired by A.G. Spalding & Brothers, advertised Racing Roller Skates with two wheels, each mounted with tempered steel ball bearings and supported by a rubber tire. These closely resembled the Pneumatic Road Skates design. However, the American versions replaced the ankle support with a strap, now known as the 45° strap in modern inline skates. (Note: Some of these pneumatic skates from Peck & Snyder still exist. See auction pictures from 2018, archived as side view and bottom view.) Many companies produced similar road skates in this period, often called "automobile cycle skates", after the pneumatic tires. For instance, John Jay Young was granted patents for steel-tired wheels as early as 1872. However, by 1905 he was selling skates with pneumatic wheels instead. (Note: See pictures of John Jay Young Automobile Cycle Skates from an eBay auction, archived here, with front/top views and bottom view.) The Cycle Skate and Sporting Goods Company also sold these skates in 1906.

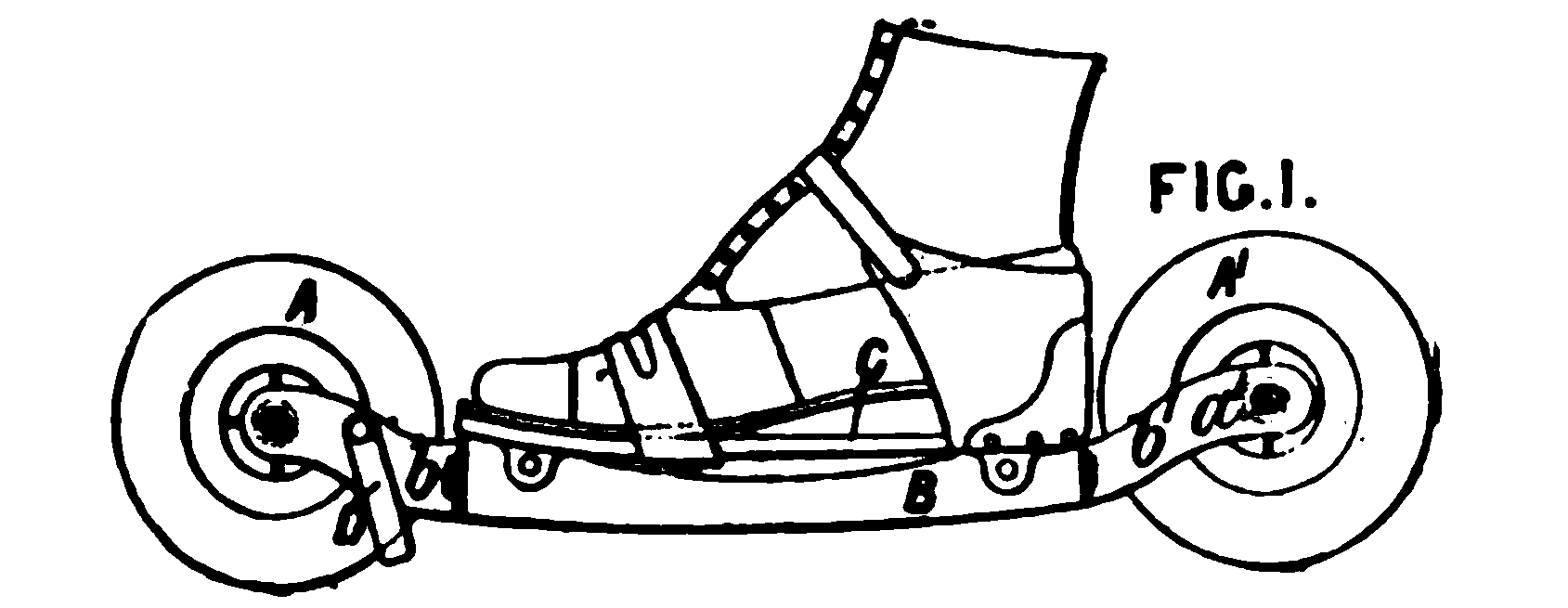
Sherrif/Anderson skate - 1893

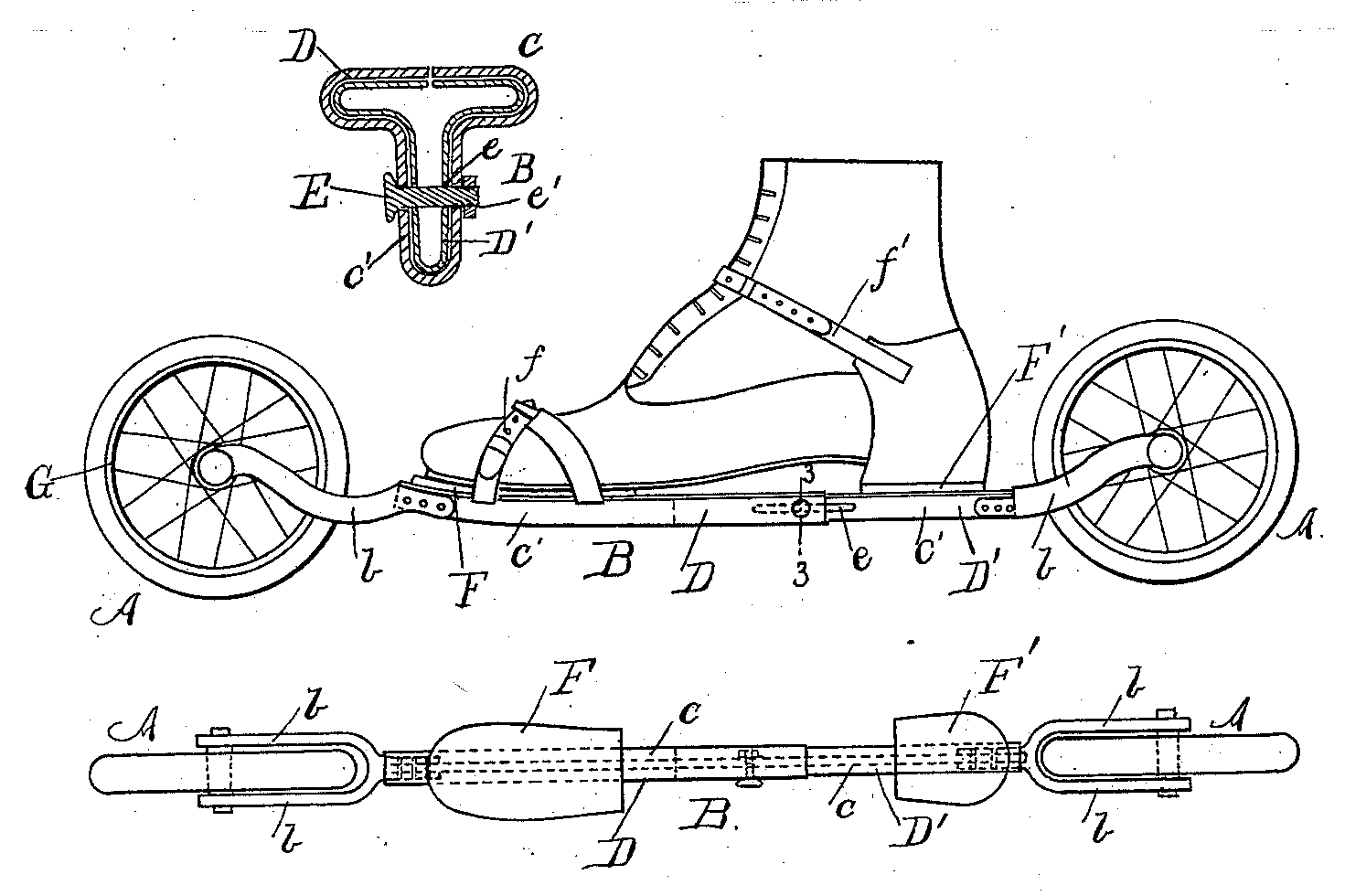
Lindsley road skate - 1899

Another popular two-wheeled skate set the foot stand below the centers of wheels. This required that the wheels be placed in front of and behind the foot stand. In 1893, the first patent describing this design configuration was granted to A. Sherrif and R. Anderson. In 1899, Augustus Nichols Lindsley was issued the first patent for a telescopic stock for this type of skate, to accommodate different foot sizes. The design employed T-shaped tubing for the telescopic connections. In 1903, Benjamin S Peard filed a patent application on a wheel hub with spokes and fillets to reduce weight while still providing rigidity and strength. The Peard wheel was particularly suited for this skate design.

By 1906, Cycle Skate and Sporting Goods Co. began selling road skates that combined features from Sherif/Anderson (low foot stand), Lindsley (adjustable stock), and Peard (wheels with hub and spokes). In 1912, John Jay Young followed suit and began selling similar skates. (Note: See auction pictures of John Jay Young Automobile Road Skates from this listing and this listing from an antique exchange, archived here and here. Also see this eBay listing with this archived image.) These were marketed as "Automobile Road Skates" in 1913 and beyond.

== Precursors ==
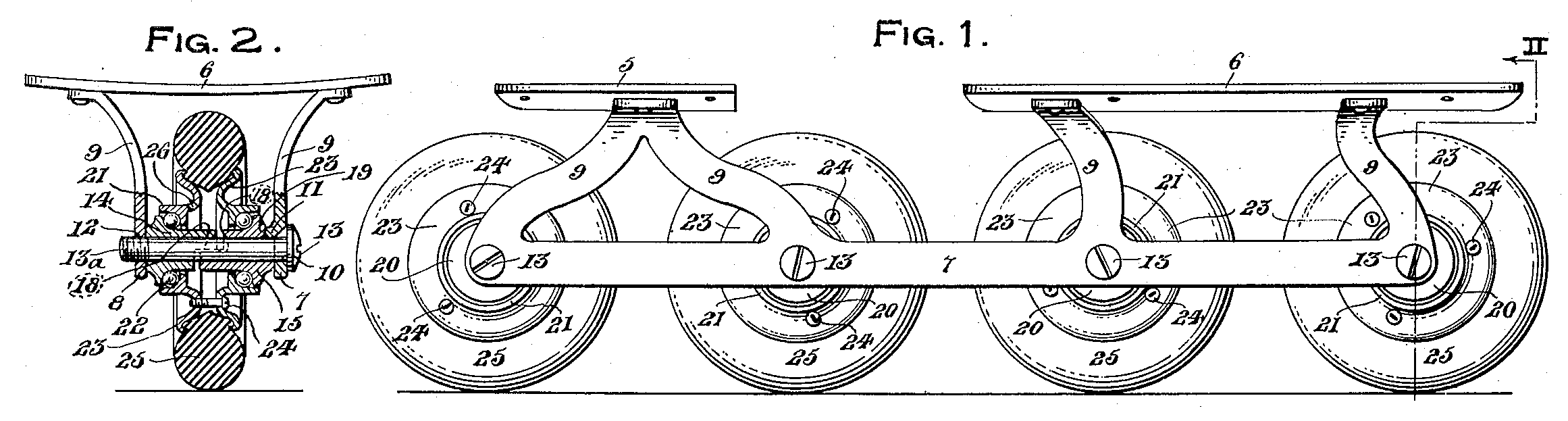
Axle as threaded bolt - Harry 1925

From the 1910s to the 1970s, many more variations of single-line wheeled skates were patented and manufactured. While still in the shadow of 2x2 roller skates, some of these started to gain popularity amongst ice hockey players, by the 1960s and 1970s, due to their better emulation of ice blades.

In 1925, the US patent office granted Chomin Harry of Canada a patent for a skate frame that gave each wheel axle dual purposes: 1) interlocking with the inner race of double ball bearings, as an axle, and 2) being threaded into one sidewall of the wheel frame, as a bolt. This enabled easy wheel replacement, and allowed an ice blade to be attached in place of the wheels.

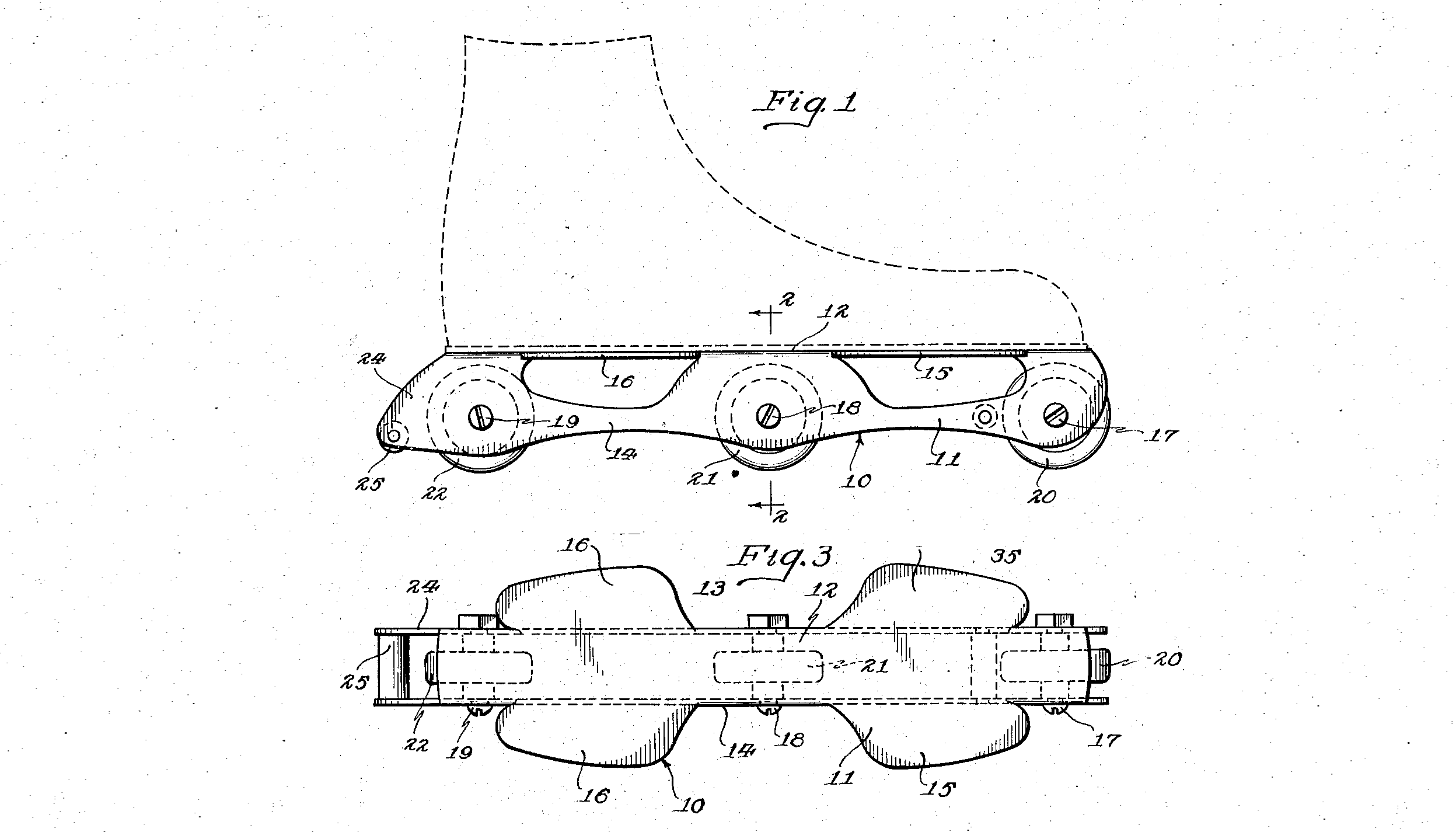
Single-piece frame - Siffert 1938

In 1938, Christian Siffert secured a patent on a roller skate frame resembling 21st century inline skates, complete with a heel brake. The frame accommodated 3 wheels. This odd selection of wheel numbers was intentional and led to the patented claim. It allowed the frame to be economically cut from a single sheet of metal, where portions of sidewalls were repurposed into parts of toe and heel plates, leaving voids seen on sidewalls. This was one of the very few pre-Rollerblade frames where two sidewalls of a frame were permanently connected. The resulting single-piece frame was lighter, stronger and cheaper than previous designs. This skate was produced and sold by Siffert himself initially in 1941, by Best Ever Built Skate Co. (BEB) thereafter, and later as "Jet Skate" by AFCO Products Inc. in 1948. (Note: See pictures of Siffert's skates sold by Best Ever Built Skate Co at Le Roller en Ligne. The National Museum of Roller Skating has the Siffert skate in its collection. See this archived picture from its earlier, now defunct, website. Also refer to a picture shown here, archived here.)

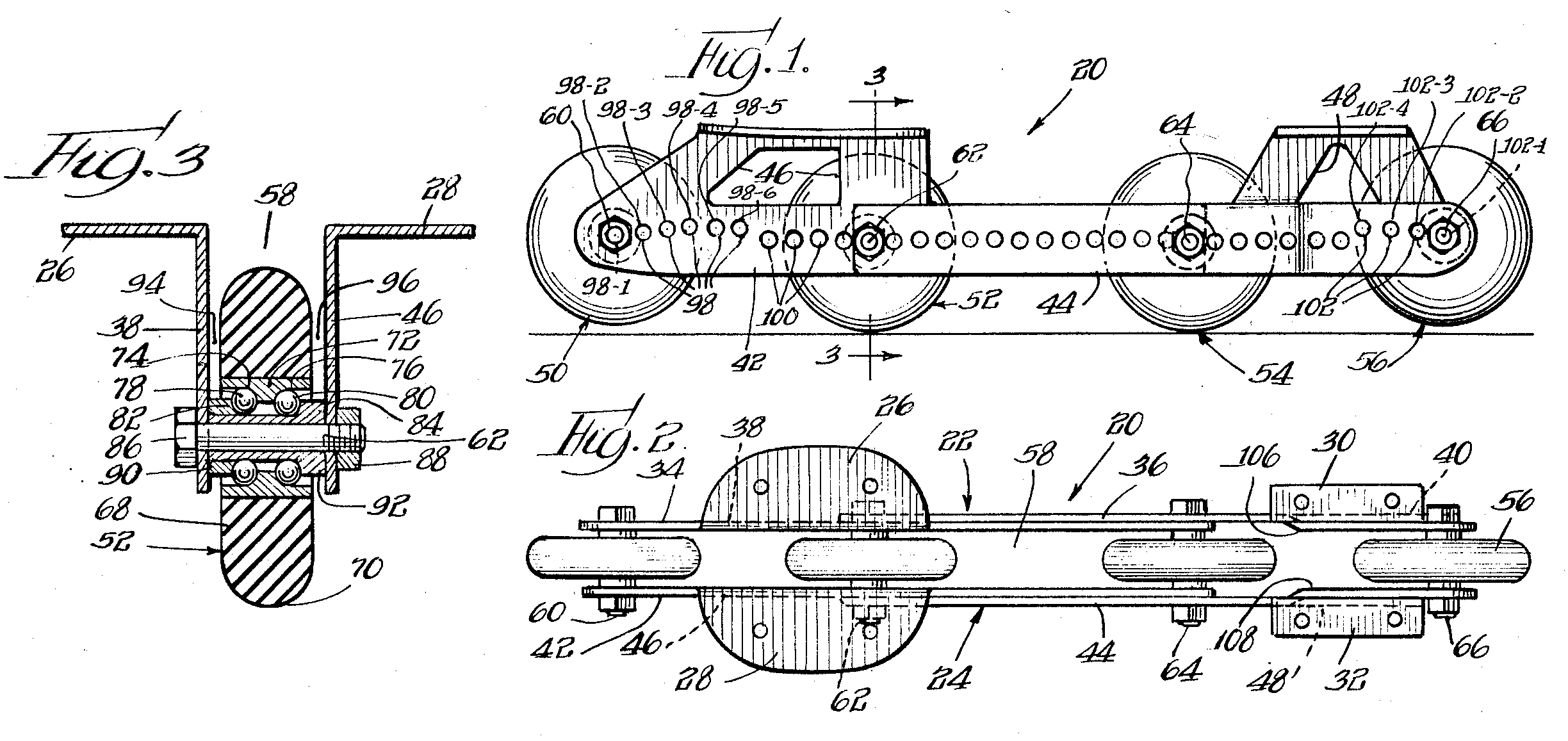
Adjustable frame - Ware 1966

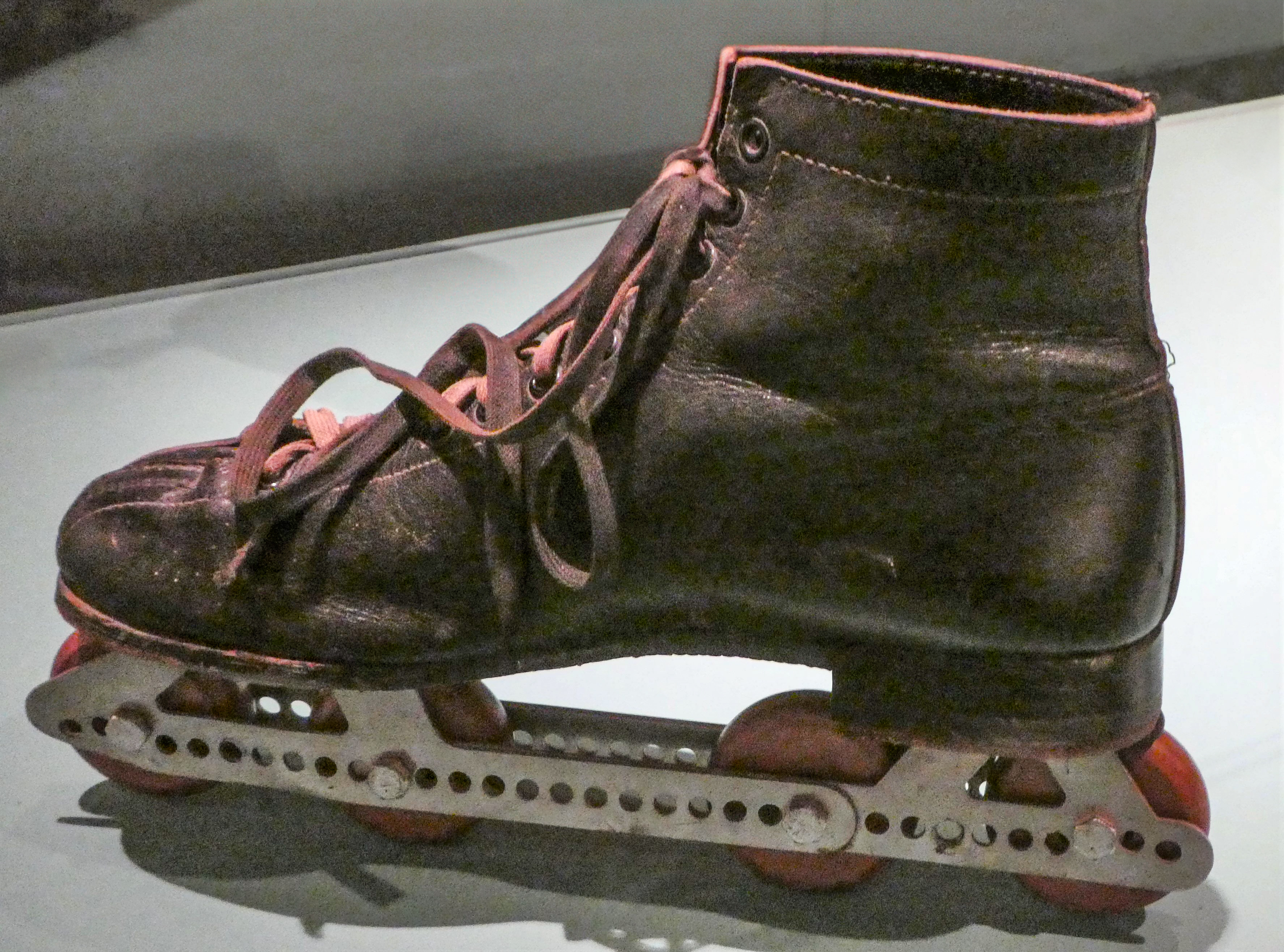
Chicago Roller-Blade - 1965

In 1966, Gordon K Ware, one of the Ware brothers who founded the successful Chicago Roller Skate Company, obtained a patent for a skate with multiple frame segments that overlapped. In this design, wheel axles served a second purpose - that of securing overlapping segments through specific axle holes. This allowed the frame to adjust to various shoes and sizes. In addition, the front wheel and the rear wheel could be placed higher than the middle two, to create various rockered wheel setups for better turning. Wheels were mounted on double ball bearings. This skate could be customized for different needs from different sports, including figure skating, speed skating, and ice hockey. (Note: The National Museum of Roller Skating has the Gordon Ware Chicago skate in its collection. See this archived picture from its earlier, now defunct, website. This archived August 2015 newsletter shows a better picture of the same Chicago skate. The same skate with a low-cut shoe was shown in a Washington State History Museum exhibit on Roller Skates in 2023. See this picture, archived here. Also see archive pictures one, two, three and four from an antique listing.) (Note: Page 13 of Fried-Cassorla's book shows a picture of the original Roller-Blade in its "A History of Skating" section.)

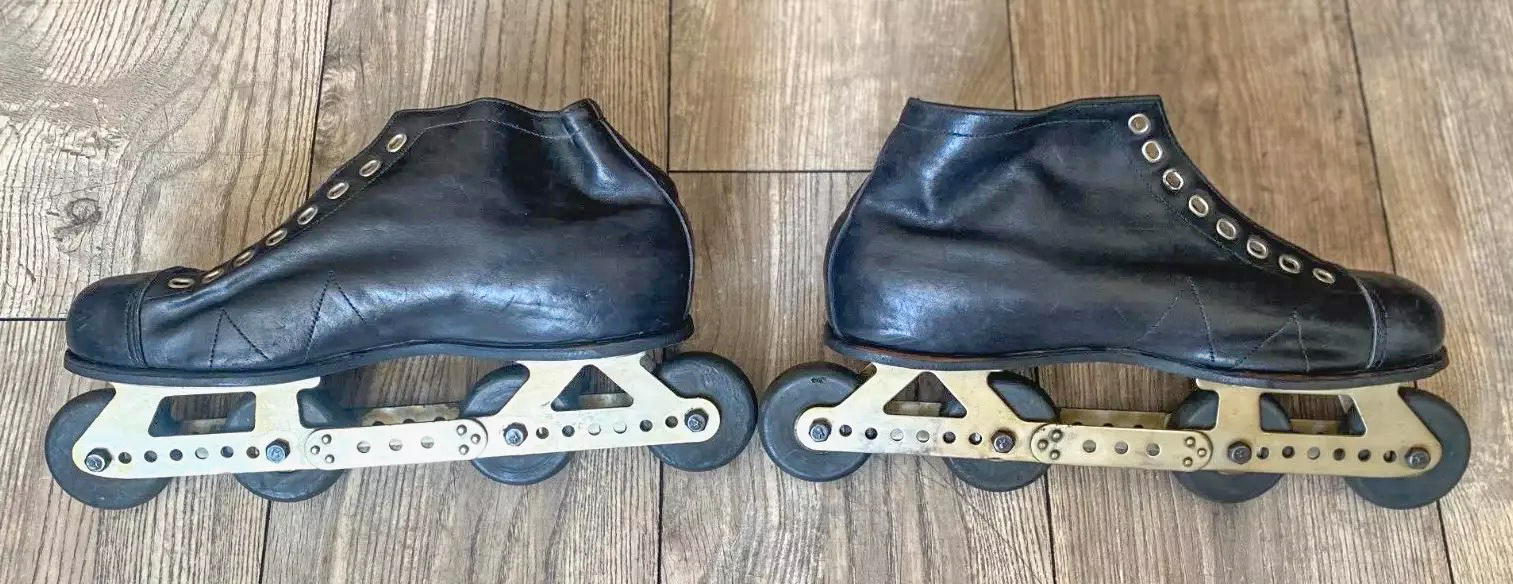
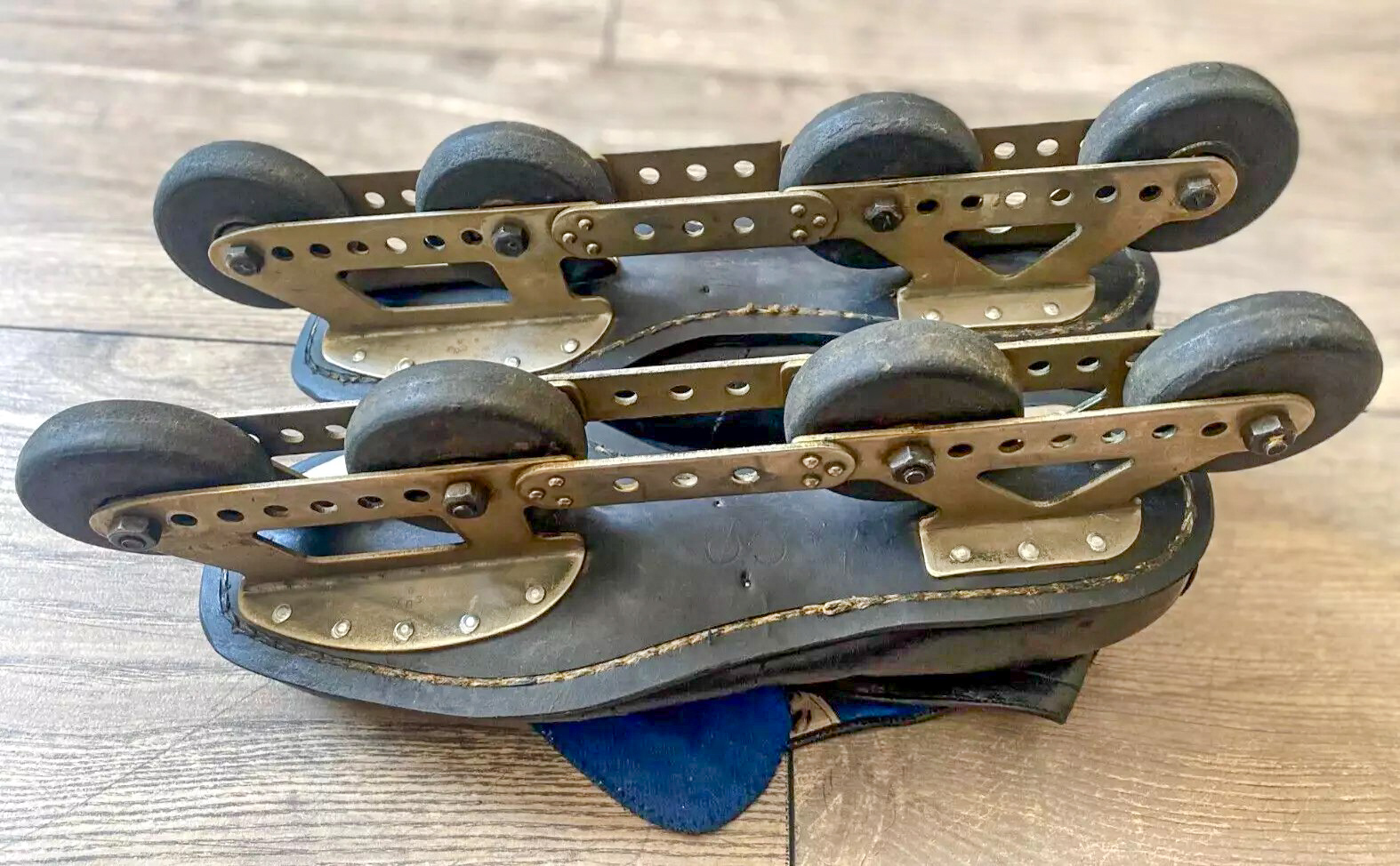
USSR skates from 1962

The inspiration for this Chicago skate came from off-season training skates used by Russian speed skating teams in the 1960s. Barbara Lockhart of the US Olympic speed skating team brought a pair back to the US. Montgomery Ward commissioned 25,000 pairs of these, and advertised them in 1965 catalogs as excellent off-ice training tools for figure skating and ice hockey. The skate was sold under the name "Roller-Blade", coined by Joe Shevelson of the Chicago Roller Skate Co. Ladies' version came with high-cut leather shoes, and men's version medium-cut leather shoes. Montgomery Ward could not sell the inventory, so the skate was soon discontinued. (Note: See ads for the Chicago Roller-Blade in the 1965 Fall & Winter Montgomery Ward catalog, page 1082, archived here, and in the 1965 Spring & Summer Catalog, page 846, archived here.)

Up to this time, almost all roller skates were of the "clamp-on" variety - they were strapped to a skater's own shoes or boots. In his patent application, Ware instead described his skate as explicitly designed to be permanently riveted to any shoes a user desired to use. This borrowed from the ice hockey industry which, by 1908, routinely riveted ice blades to hockey boots, resulting in improved stability and performance for skaters.

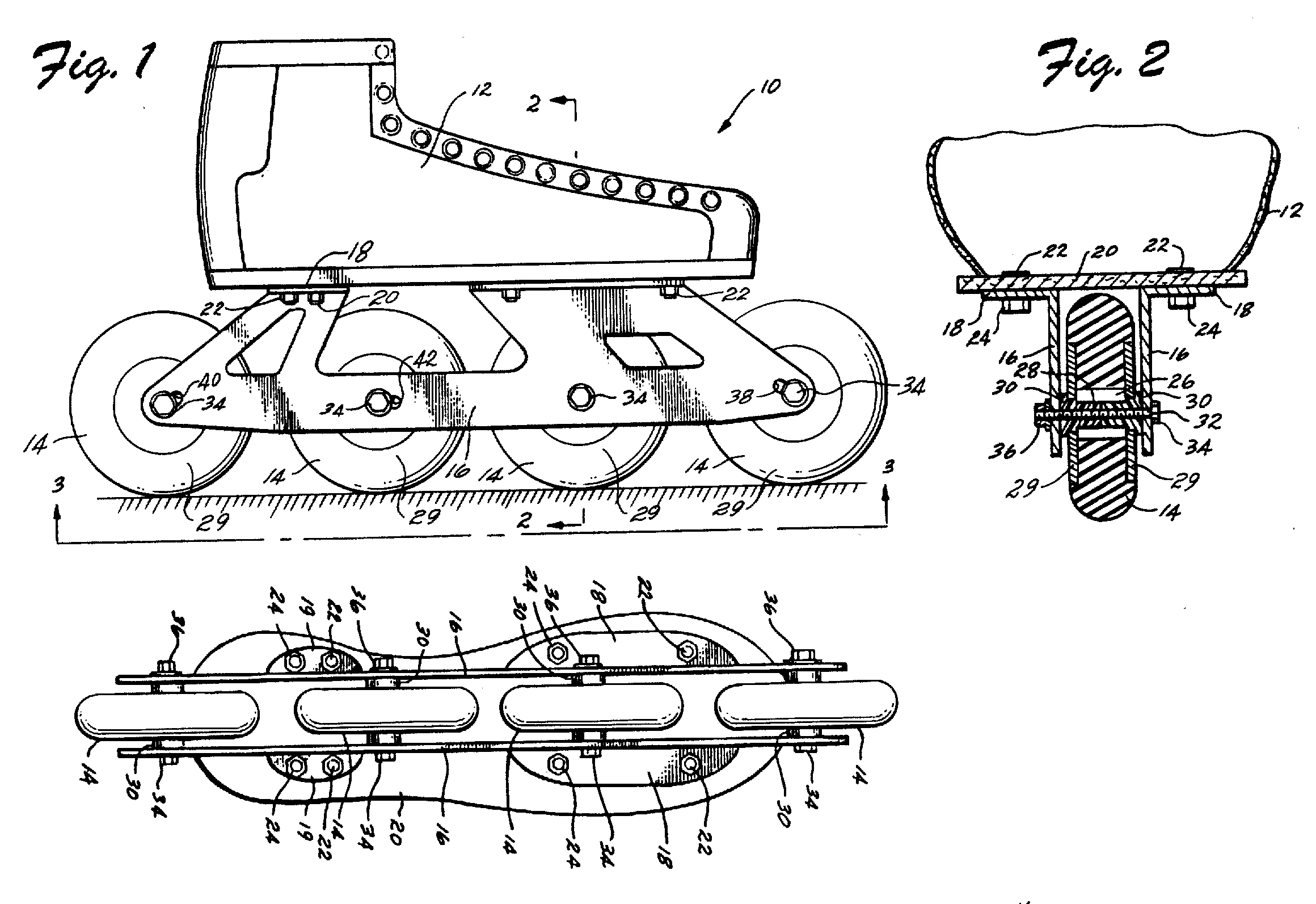
Single-unit hockey skate - Silver 1975

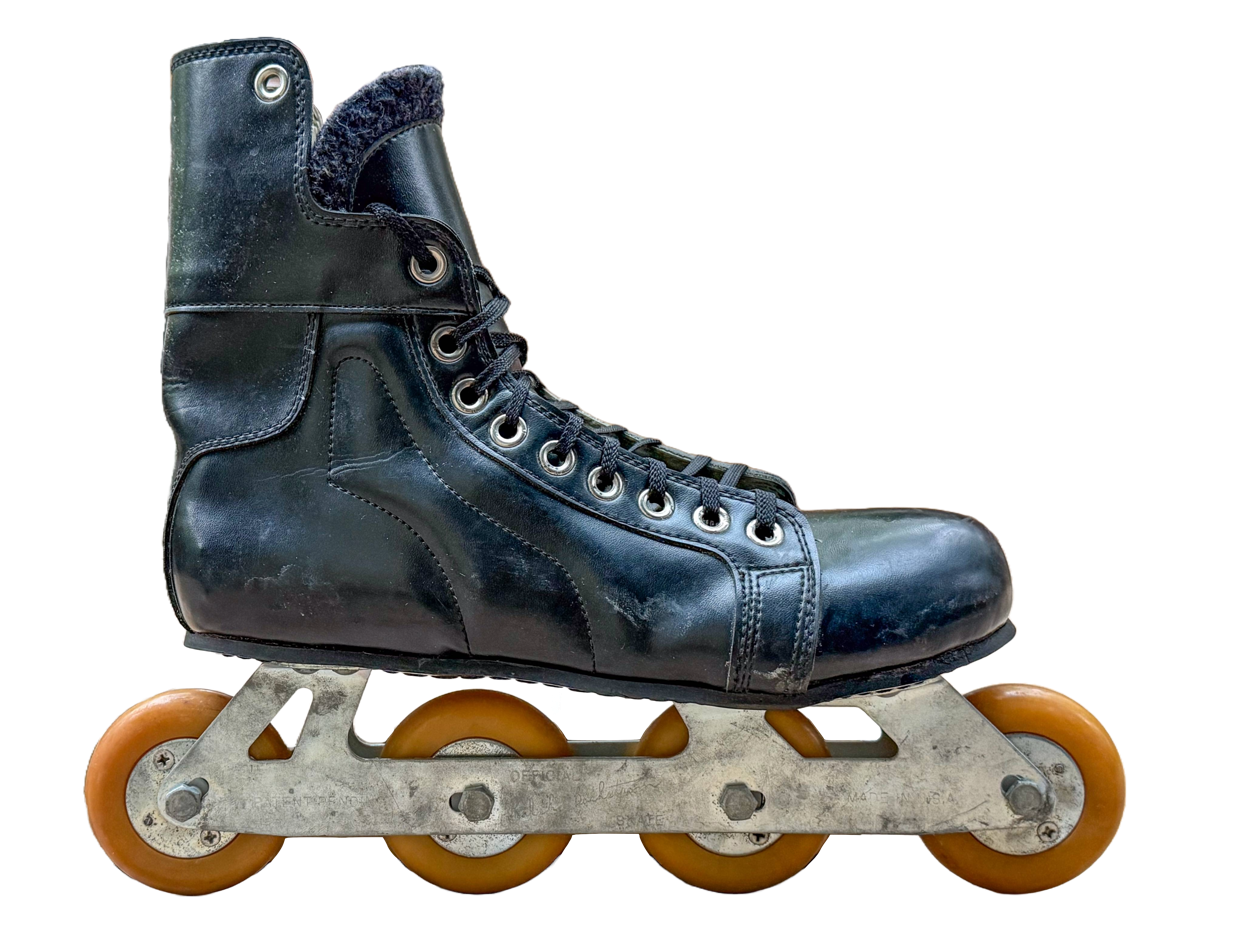
Super Sport Skate - ca 1975

In 1975, Morris (Maury) Silver received a patent on a "Tandem Roller Hockey Skate". The key claim of this patent was the single-unit nature of the skate, where a wheel frame was permanently attached to a hockey boot. Prior patents on roller skates did not claim a boot as part of the apparatus. In this patent, the boot was part of the "roller hockey skate". This skate was equipped with larger wheels than those in prior designs. The front wheel was positioned farther forward, and the rear wheel farther back, for enhanced speed and balance, as required for hockey. Both front and rear wheels can be shifted upward in their slotted mounting holes for a rockered wheel setup. The patent and drawings specified the use of roller bearings, when ball bearings had become commonplace by this time.

Silver developed his skate with his friend, Ralph Backstrom, a Canadian hockey player from the Montreal Canadiens. Backstrom briefly played for the Los Angeles Kings from 1970 to 1973, and would train off-season with this skate. Their company marketed the skate under the label Super Sport Skate (or Super Street Skate), as an off-ice training tool for ice hockey players. (Note: See ad for Super Sport Skates endorsed by Ralph Backstrom in "Faceoff" 73 / 74 season by World Hockey Association. Also see archived pictures one, two, three and four, from an antique listing.)

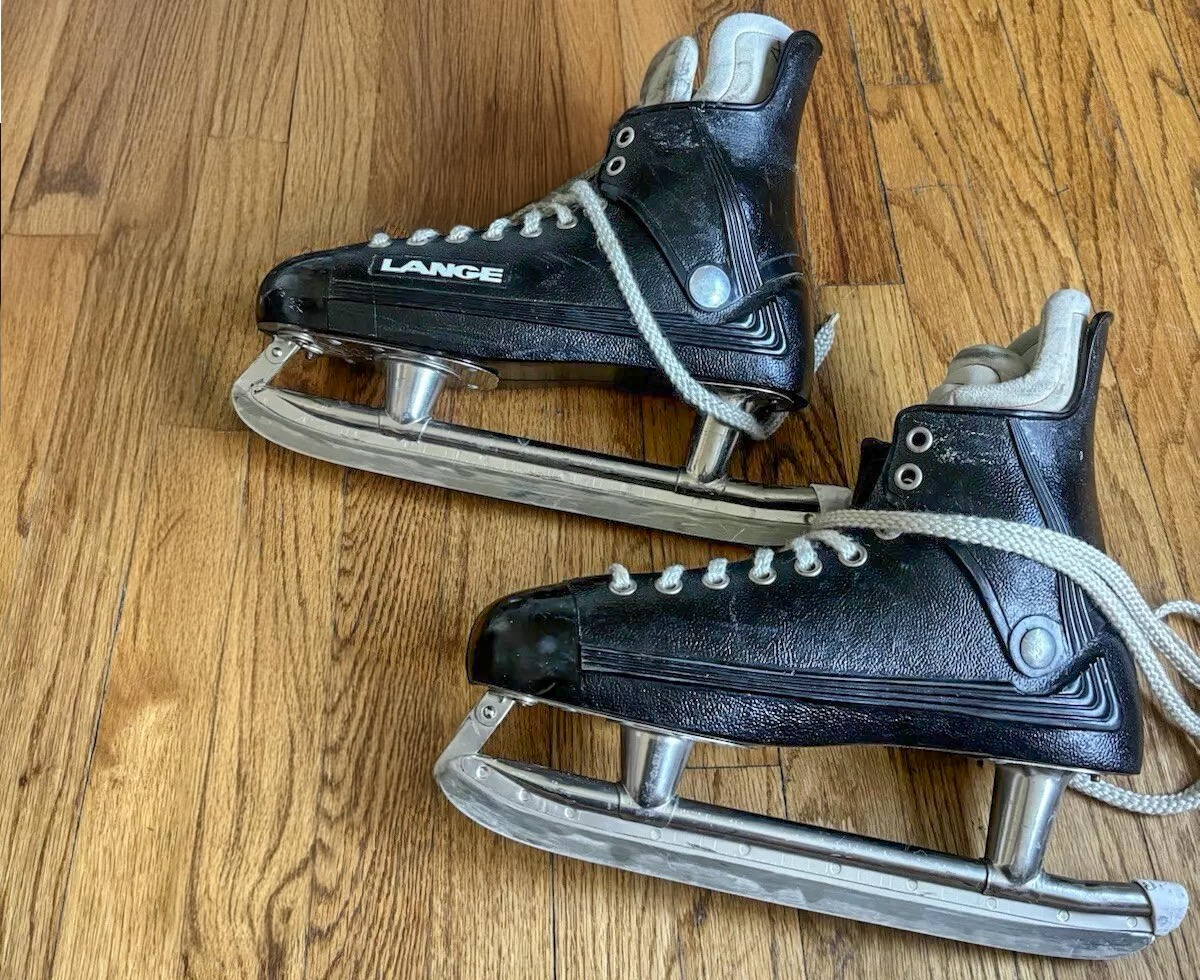
Lange hockey skates - 1970s

Meanwhile, another roller sport, skateboarding, became popular in the 1960s. Avid ocean surfers adopted skateboards with rubber wheels during downtimes. In the 1970s, the increasingly popular sport of skateboarding reached new heights with the advent of polyurethane wheels and their superior performance. Some of these polyurethane skateboard wheels were in fact made by the Chicago Roller Skating Co.

At the same time, in the 1960s, the ski boot manufacturer Lange launched the first molded plastic ski boots furnished with liners. Lange then entered the ice hockey market in the 1970s with similar plastic hard boots, gaining some success. These boots were rigid to provide proper support for aggressive hockey skating. Yet they featured soft inner liners to provide a comfortably fit, despite the use of hard shells. A pivoting cuff is riveted to the boot, allowing a player to forward flex. (Note: See archives of ads for Lange Hockey Skates: 1974, 1977 and 1979.)

Both polyurethane wheels and plastic hard boots would soon be borrowed for modern inline skating, to be combined with the best ideas from precursor skates, leading to the rise of Rollerblade in the 80s and its wide adoption by the general population.

== Modern inline skates ==
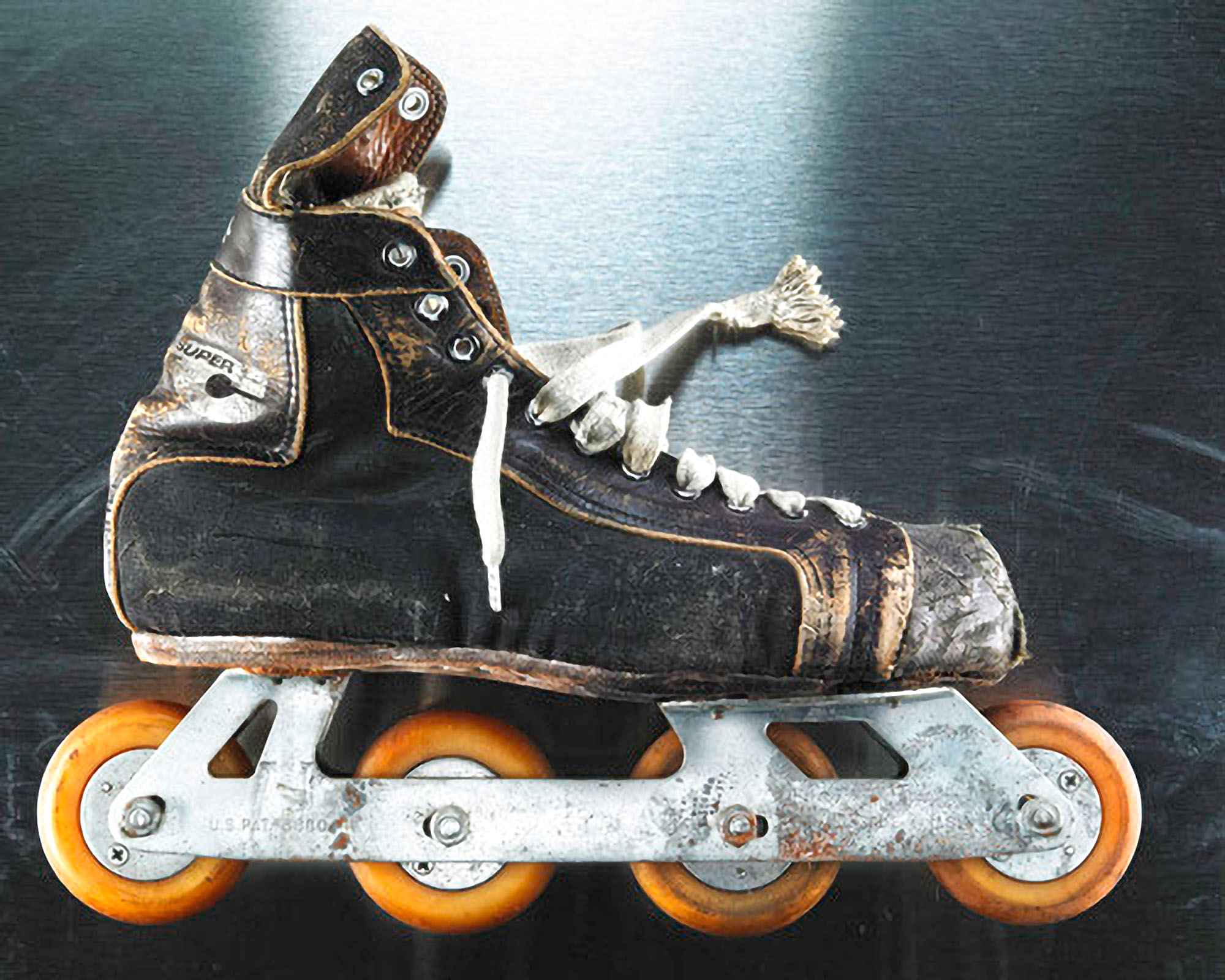
CCM Tacks boot riveted to Super Street Skate ca. 1980

For two centuries, inventors and entrepreneurs attempted to popularize skates with a single row of wheels. By the end of the 1970s, only Chicago Roller-Blade and Super Sport Skate managed to gain limited adoption for training, within a niche community of ice hockey players. It took Scott Olson, his brothers, his brother Brennan, his family, his friends, and his company, Rollerblade, to perfect these skates, and to make them enjoyable as mainstream recreation for the general population.

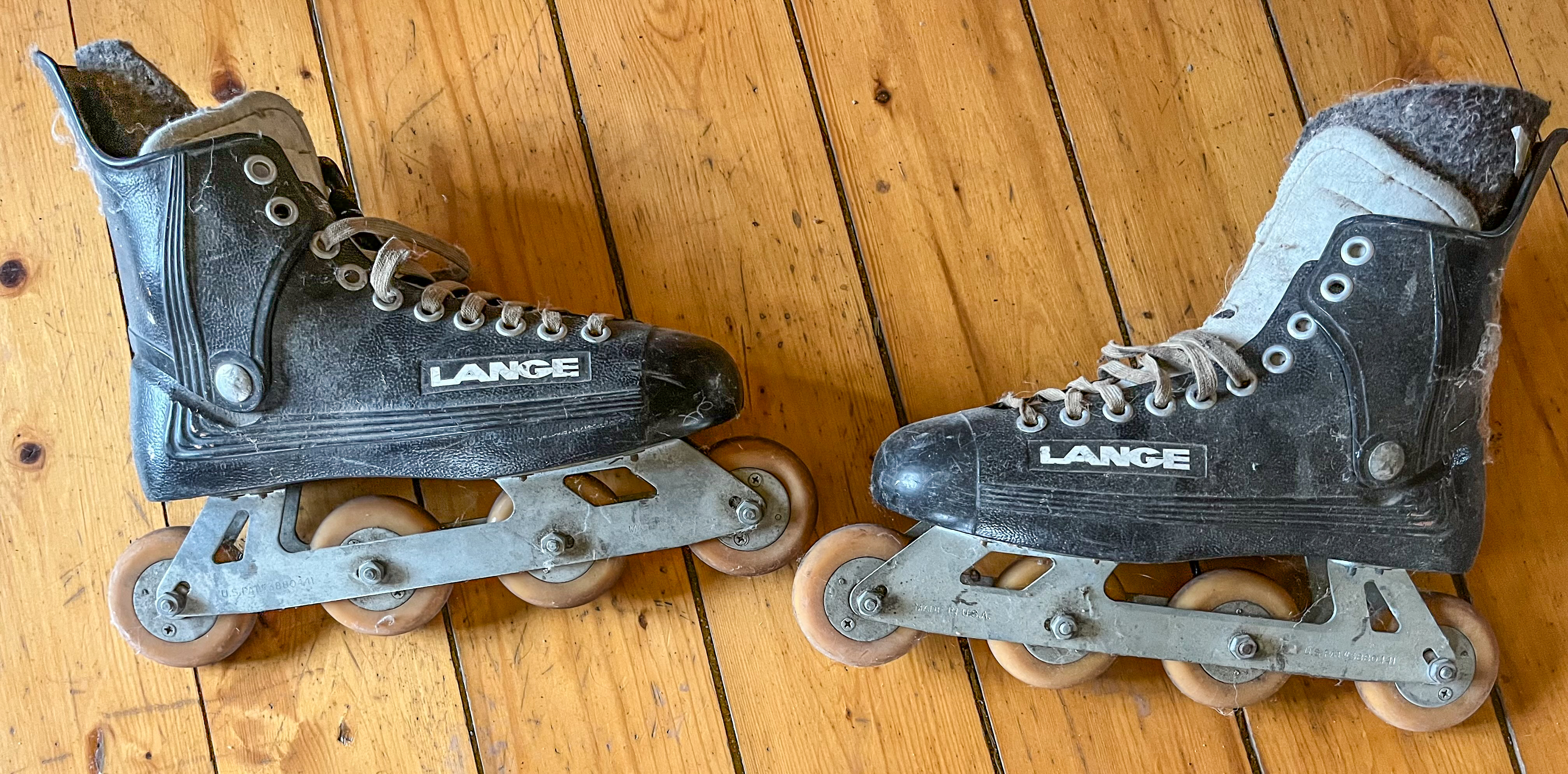
Skates used by Mark Lipson and Scott Olson ca. 1980 in a 200-mile marketing trip (Note: The MIA exhibit story from 2015 includes a picture showing Scott Olson holding two prototype skates: 1) Lange boot on Super Street Skate skate with cream-colored wheels (1979), and 2) CCM Tacks hockey skate boot on his own adjustable/expandable skate design with orange polyurethane wheels (1981). Said picture is archived here. The same two prototype skates are also seen in the main article picture of this Rollerblade article from 2019, archived here. The article picture is archived here.)

In 1979, Scott Olson, an ice hockey player, stumbled upon the Super Sport Skate (or Super Street Skate). Fascinated by these novelty skates, he soon made a living promoting and selling them to hockey players in Minneapolis. As a licensed distributor, Olson traveled on these skates through the city and around the state in guerrilla marketing tours to promote the product. Scott Olson and his brother Brennan tinkered with these skates. They removed the wheel frames from Super Street Skate, and custom-fitted them to customers' old hockey boots for improved ankle support. Wearing plastic Lange boots thus retrofitted, Scott and his friend Mark Lipson skated for 200 miles from Minneapolis to Grand Rapids, Minn., in a five-day marketing campaign.

Through further tinkering, prototyping and road testing everywhere he could, Scott Olson eventually arrived at a skate design with an adjustable/expandable frame, polyurethane wheels and double ball bearings. The skate rolled faster, and remained more reliable on road surfaces. (Note: See pictures of early prototypes of Ultimate Street Skate with "Ole's Innovative Sports" stamped on their frames, from this page on Vintage Minnesota Hockey, such as this picture, this picture and this picture, plus this ad. Archived here, with picture, picture, picture and picture.) But a patent search turned up the Chicago Roller-Blade, which claimed many of his design features. In 1981, Olson persuaded the Chicago Roller Skate Company to give him the patent, in exchange for a percentage of the profit.

In 1981, Scott Olson created a company called Ole's Innovative Sports, and made manufacturing arrangements. Soon, he marketed his own "Ultimate Street Skates" (or Ultimate Hockey Skates), a skate of his own design attached to a hard boot with thick liners, similar to plastic hockey boots that traced back to Lange ski boot designs. By then, skateboards had adopted polyurethane wheels made by roller skate manufacturers, with standard ISO 608 ball bearings. Scott similarly adopted polyurethane roller skate wheels from Kryptonics, shaving tens of thousands to fit them to his Ultimate skates. These skates came with a toe brake and had the now-familiar Rollerblade logo imprinted on them, which Scott and his friend designed. (Note: See a roadshow display of the Ultimate Hockey Skate here, archived here, from this article, archived here.) (Note: A picture of the 1981 Ultimate Hockey Skate is shown under the headline: "Modern inline skate", on page 11 of the book Superguides: Inline Skating published by DK.)

In 1982, Scott Olson started to market his skates as a proper sport in itself, venturing out of the initial niche where they served as an off-season training tool for ice hockey. Scott organized Minnesota hockey players to fly east to play roller hockey teams in New York City, with his team skating on Ultimate Street Skates, and the NYC teams on traditional 2x2 skates. Scott also started to advertise his skates to the masses, in print and in person, as everyday fun activities, where one could "roll over large sidewalk craters without feeling them". Enthusiasts colloquially referred to these skates as "roller blades".

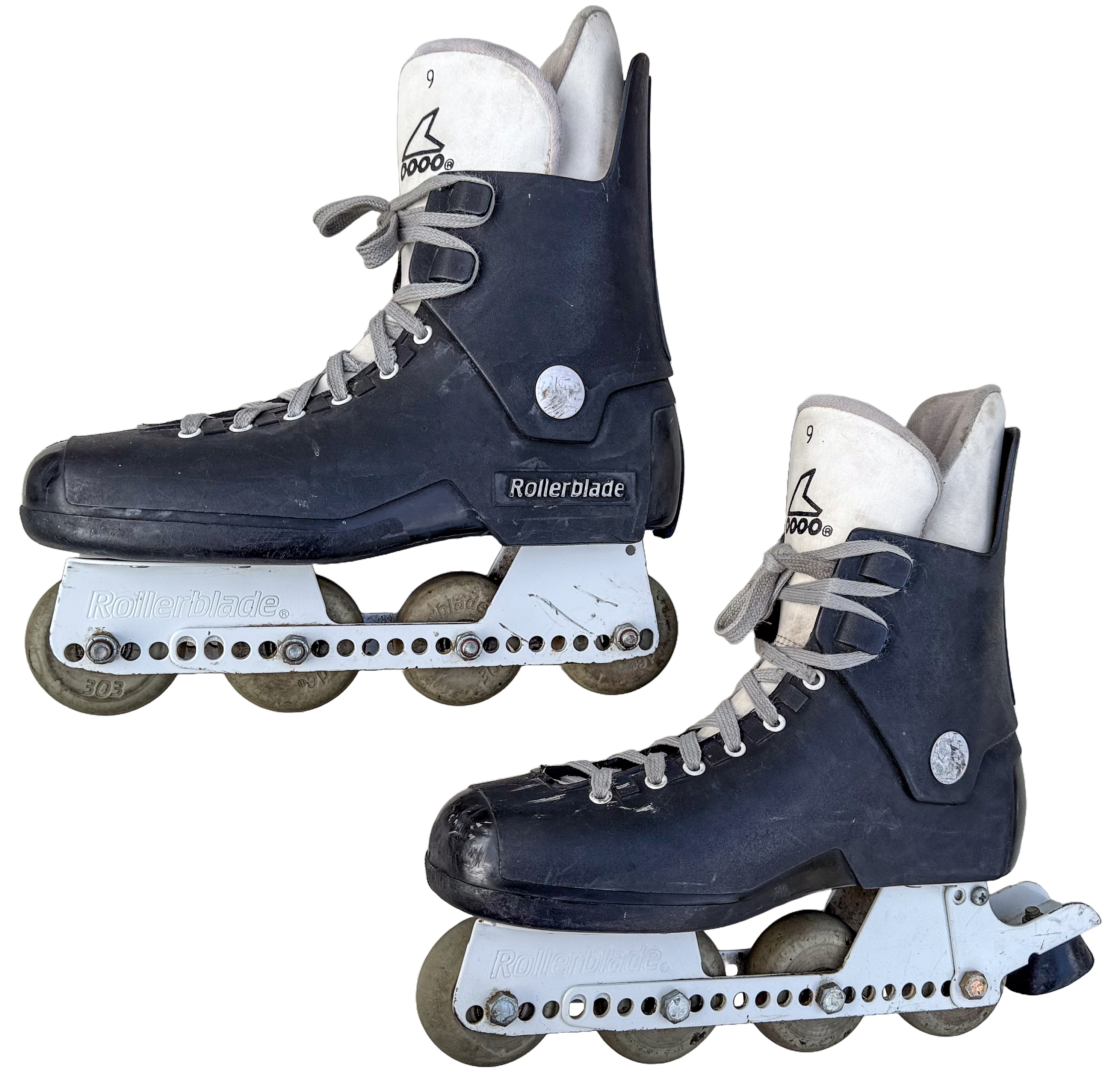
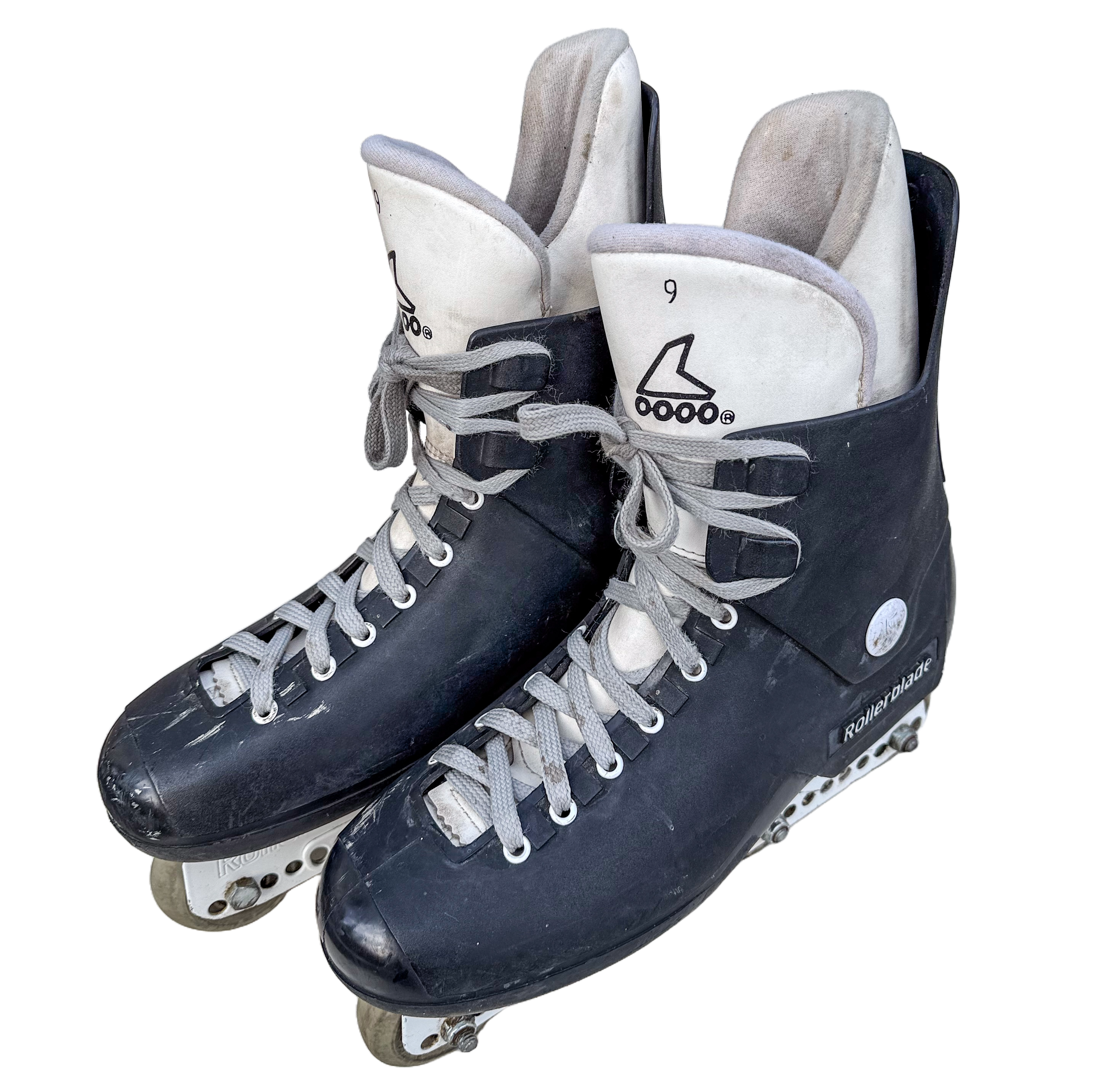
Rollerblade skates with heel brakes - 1983

In 1983, Scott Olson marketed a new generation of skates with heel brakes instead of toe brakes, under the trademark "Rollerblade". His company grew from one worker in 1980 to 25 employees in 1985, selling many thousands of units that year. (Note: See pictures of the new generation of early Rollerblade skates with heel brakes, from Vintage Minnesota Hockey: picture, picture, picture and picture, archived here, here, here and here. These have a refined version of the adjustable frame from the Ultimate Street Skate, and a similar hard boot. These skates witnessed the transition of Scott Olson's company from "Ole's Innovative Sports", to "North American Sports Training Corp.", and finally to "Rollerblade", as attested by marketing materials.) In the same year, the company published a book, Rollerblades: Dryland Training for Ice Hockey, edited and largely ghost-written by Chris Middlebrook with Randy Gregg, Jack Blatherwick, Laura Stamm, Brad Buetow, Scott Olson, and Brennan Olson. This is the first book that elaborated on the equivalency of inline and ice hockey skates with respect to hockey moves, and the first book that documented wheel rockering adjustments, wheel wear, and wheel rotations.

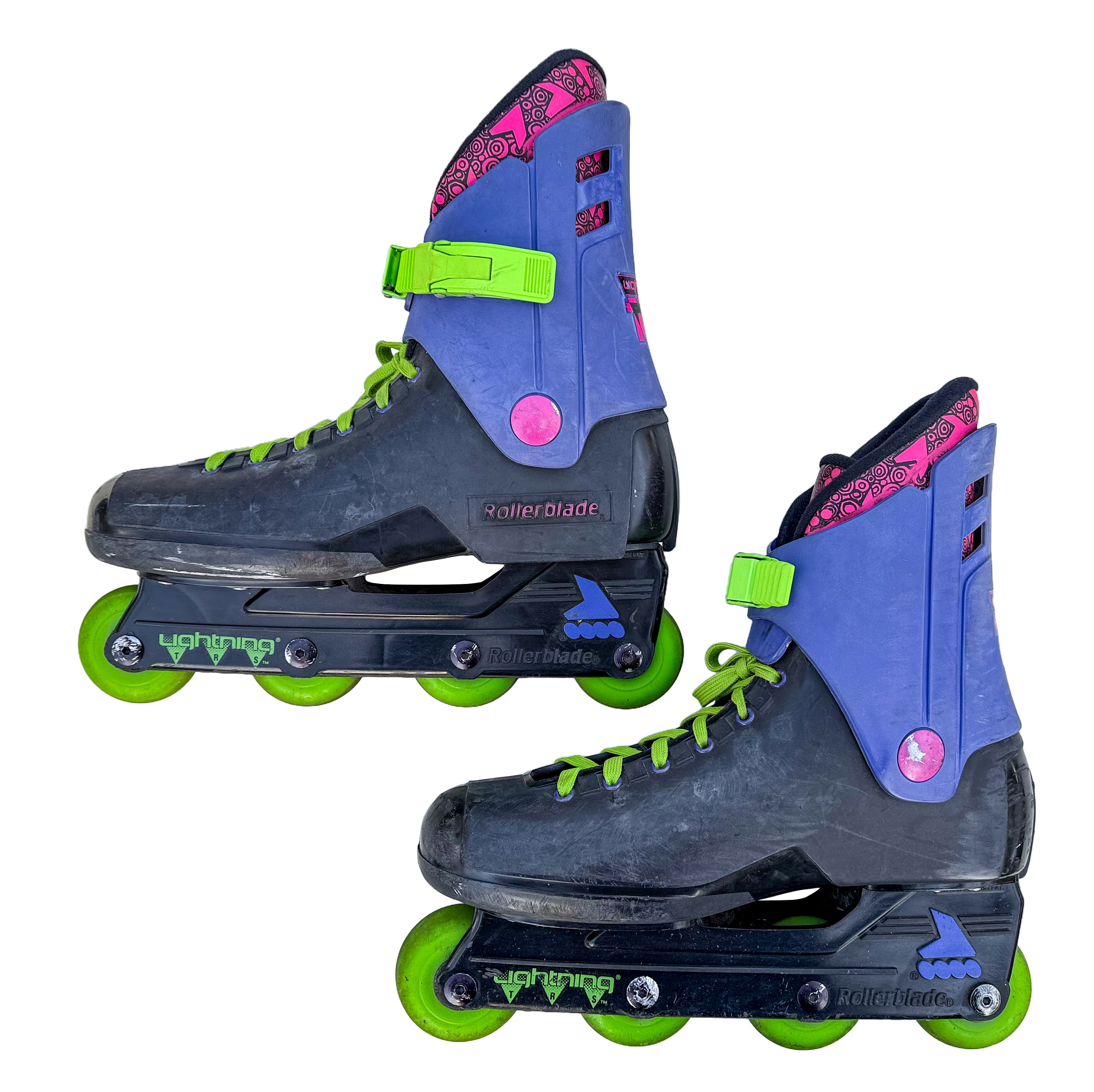
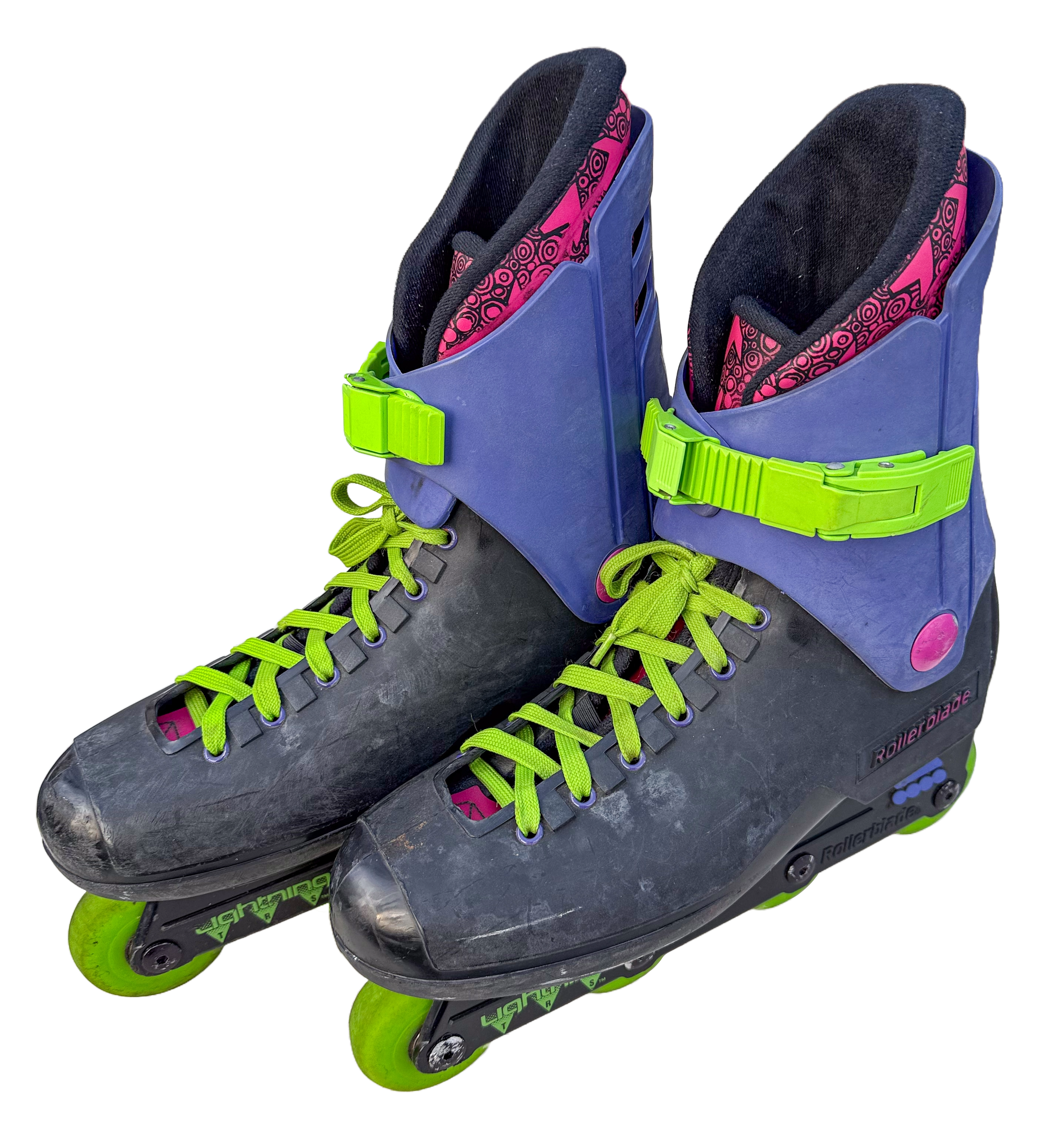
Lightning TRS - 1988

Around 1986, Ole's Innovative Sports was renamed "North American Sports Training Corporation" (NASTC). As the Rollerblade brand became more popular, the company was eventually renamed to Rollerblade Inc. around 1988.

In 1988, the company released Lightning skates with fiberglass-reinforced plastic frames. (Note: See pictures of early Lightning skates from Vintage Minnesota Hockey: 1987 with round heel brake, 1988 ad for hockey players and 1989 ad for hockey players, archived here, here and here. Note how the 1987 ad had "© 1987 NASTC", and the 1988 one "© 1988 Rollerblace, Inc." See this vintage Lightning listing for Lightning skates with a square heel brake, archived here.) (Note: Brennan Olson's patent application filed in 1987 described key innovations in the 1988 Lightning skate: a single-piece plastic frame with reinforcement bridges, toggleable inserts for mounting hole for rockering (named axle aperture plug in the specification), and wheel hubs each with an interlock rim (named outer annular ring 16P) over which polyurethane is molded to reduce wheel deformation and heat buildup.) The Lightning TRS (Team Rollerblade series) with a cuff buckle was particularly successful, and turned "Rollerblade" into a household name. (Note: See pictures of Lightning TRS skates with a cuff buckle in this listing and this listing, archived here and here.) The company claimed to have up to 75% of the estimated $12 million market in 1988.

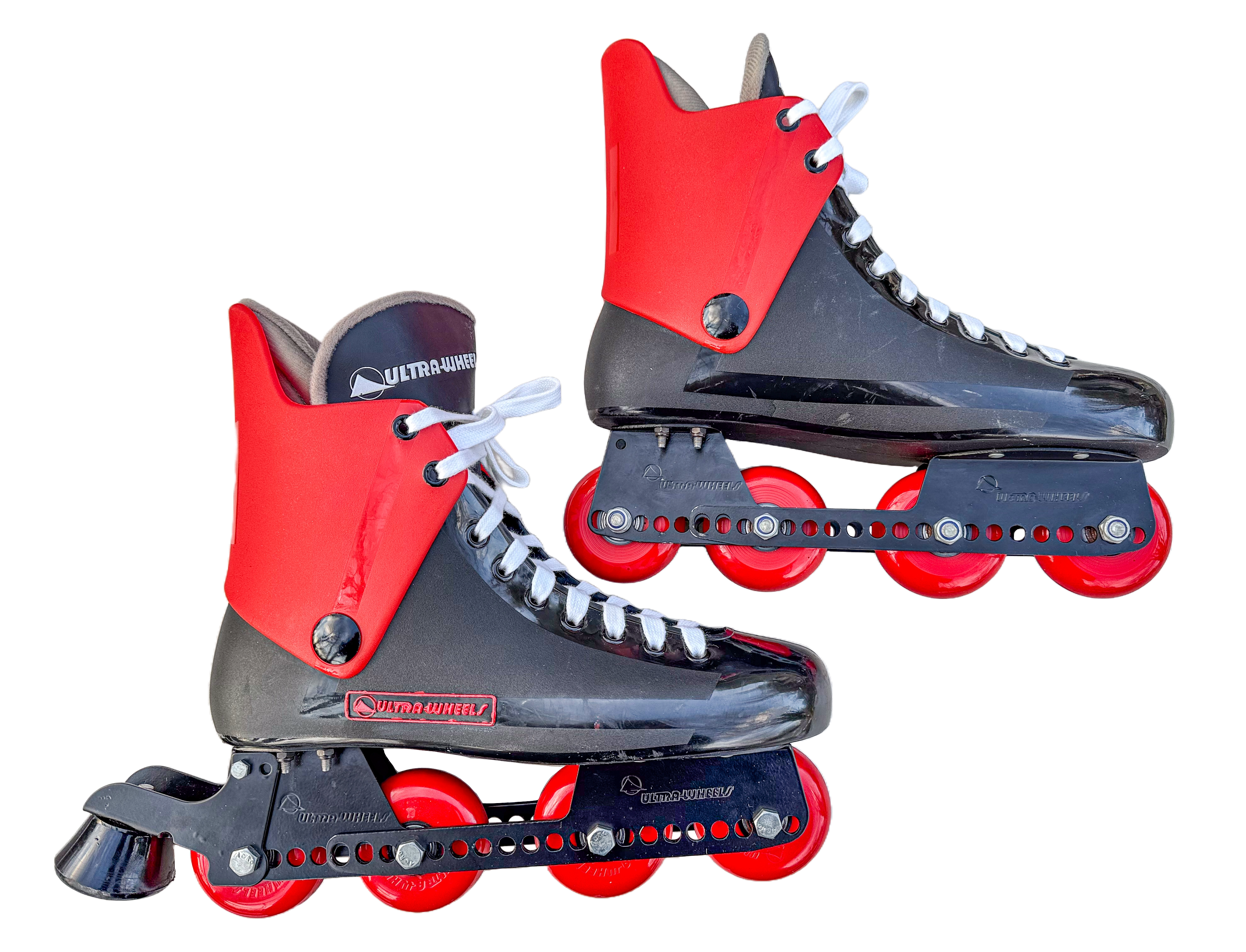
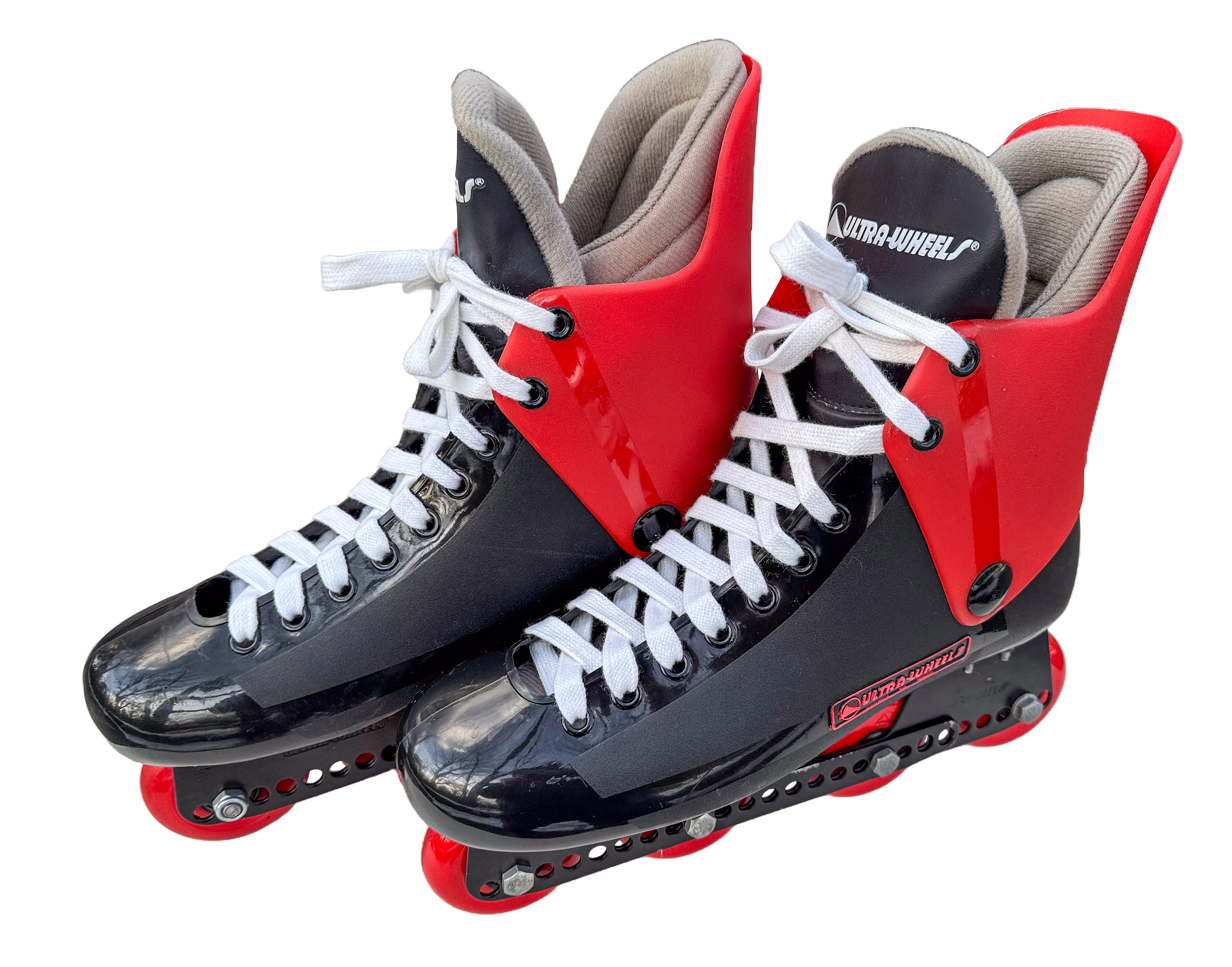
Ultra Wheels - 1986

The Chicago Roller-Blade patent expired at the end of 1983. Eying the success of Rollerblade, competitors jumped into the race. Another Minneapolis firm, First Team Sports Inc., started manufacturing its Ultra Wheels skates in 1986. More manufacturers joined in, including Oxygen, K2 and Bauer. (Note: Page 10 of Skaters magazine from 1990 featured an announcement on the signing of Wayne Gretsky and his wife for a four-year promotional campaign, by First Team Sports, Inc., the company behind Ultra Wheels.) Then, the Super Sport Skate patent expired in 1992. This allowed even more inline manufacturers to produce skates without fear of infringement.

Rollerblade continued to dominate the market in the 1990s, in the face of competition. In 1990, it had 66% of the estimated $50 million global inline market. Sales peaked in 1996, leaving 1997 with a reported revenue of $106 million, or nearly 40% of the estimated market. According to Rollerblade, by 1997, 20 percent of American households had a pair of inline skates.

Participation in the emerging sport of inline skating grew fourfold between 1989 and 1993. According to In-Line Skating Facts published by Rollerblade Inc. in 1993, the number of inline skaters rose from 3,065,000 in 1989 to 12,559,000 in 1993. By 1998, a survey found that 32 million Americans over the age of six had tried inline skates at least once that year.

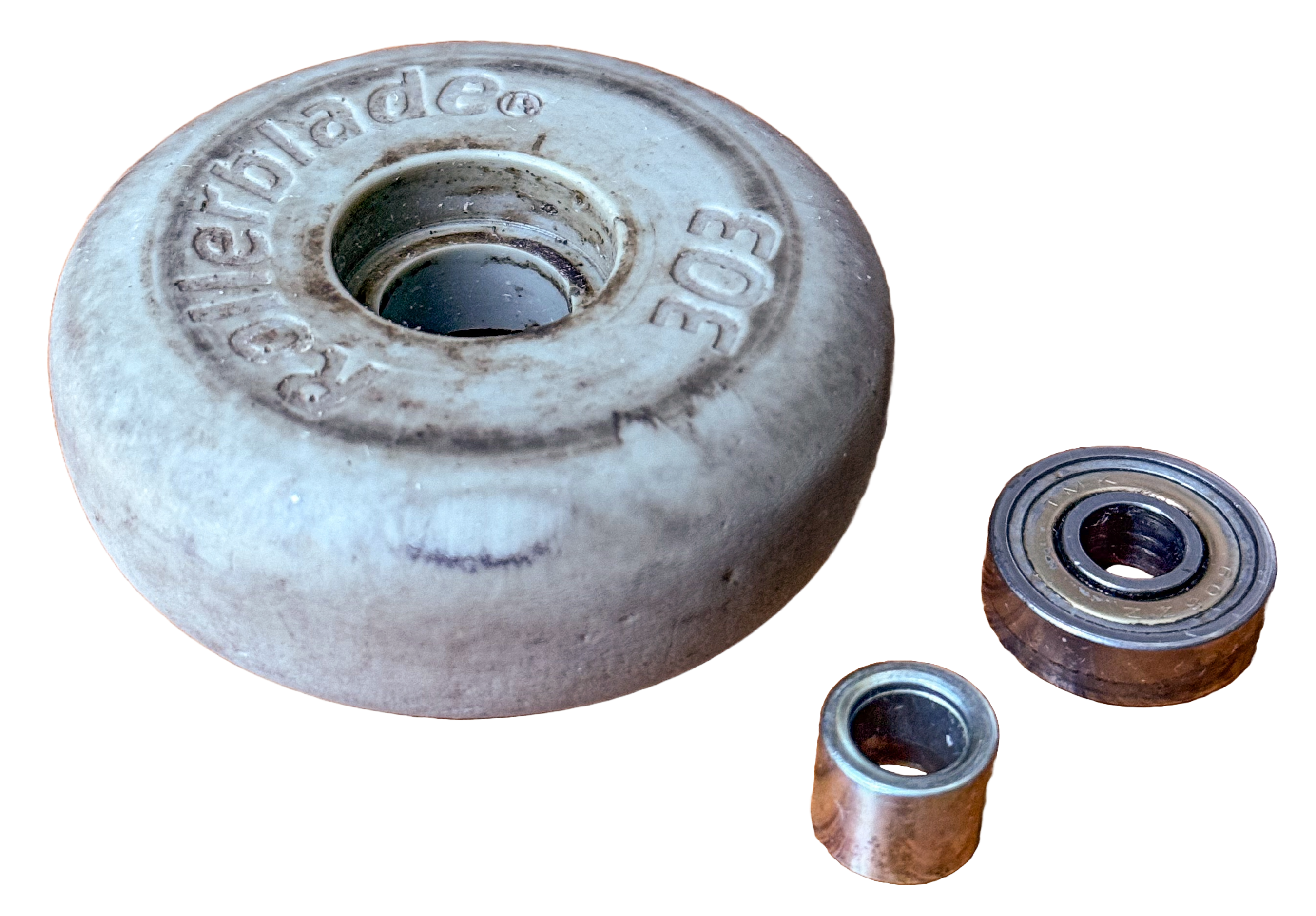
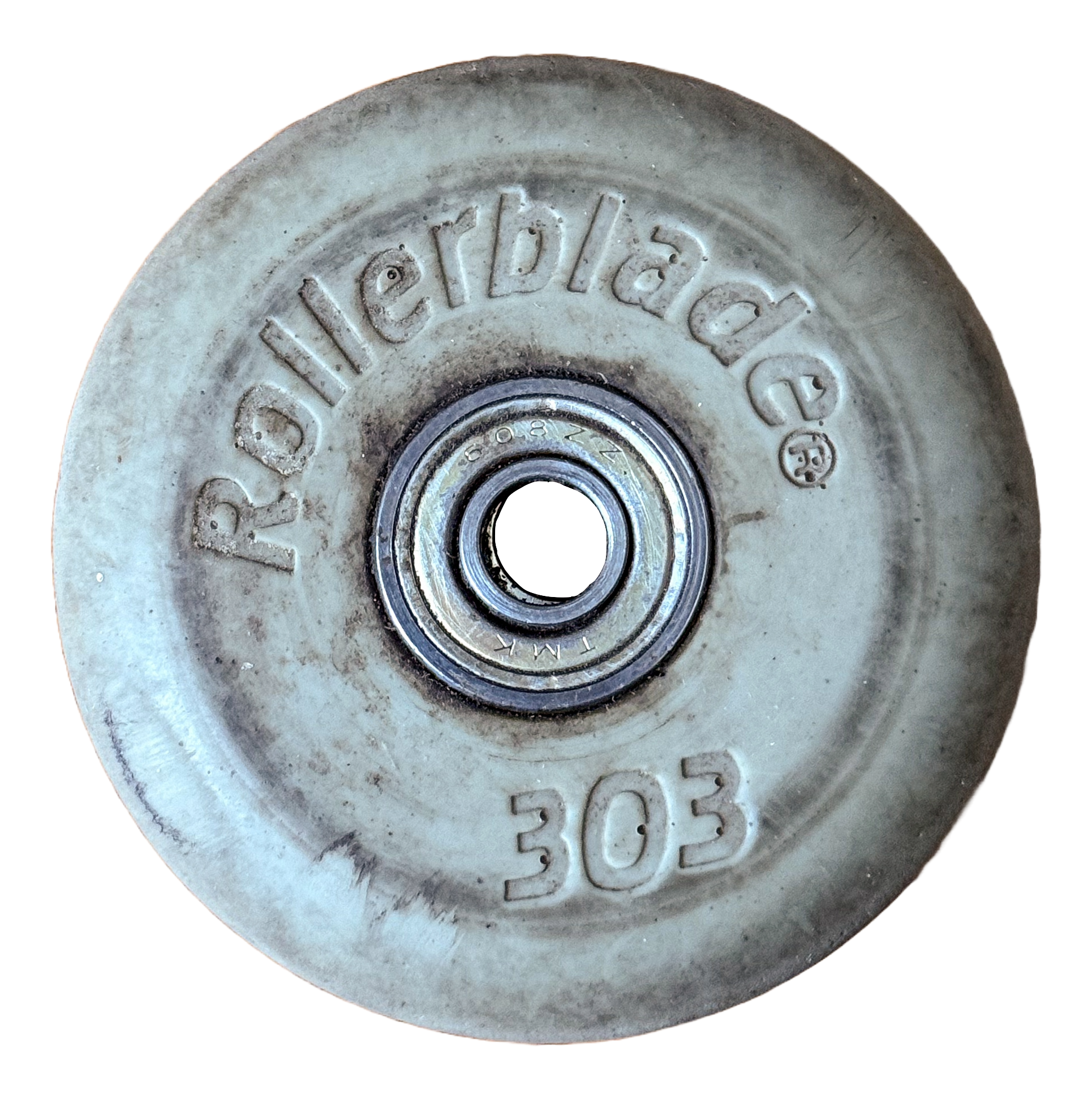
Urethane wheels with ISO bearings (1980s)

Modern inline skates became practical for manufacturers to mass-produce, and enjoyable for the masses as a recreational sport, when technological advances such as polyurethane wheels, standard ISO 608 ball bearings, and molded plastic boots arrived on the scene. These skates incorporate double ball bearings with dual-purpose axles from Chomin Harry (1925), single-piece frames from Christian Siffert (1938), adjustable wheel rockering from Gordon Ware (1966), single-unit boot/frame, longer frames and larger wheels from Maury Silver (1975), plus additional innovations.

Both Scott and Brennan continued to refine skates, each having been granted a dozen patent applications for skate-related innovations from 1982 through 1996. Rollerblade's official Our Story, archived by Alexa Internet/Internet Archive in 1997, recounted the company's history from 1980 to 1995, and highlighted key innovations in inline skating. These included the first use of polyurethane boots and wheels, metal and non-metal frames, dual bearings, heel brakes, wheel hubs (cores), buckle closures, ventilated shells, breathable liners, memory foam liners, and more.

== Rollerblade as a noun ==
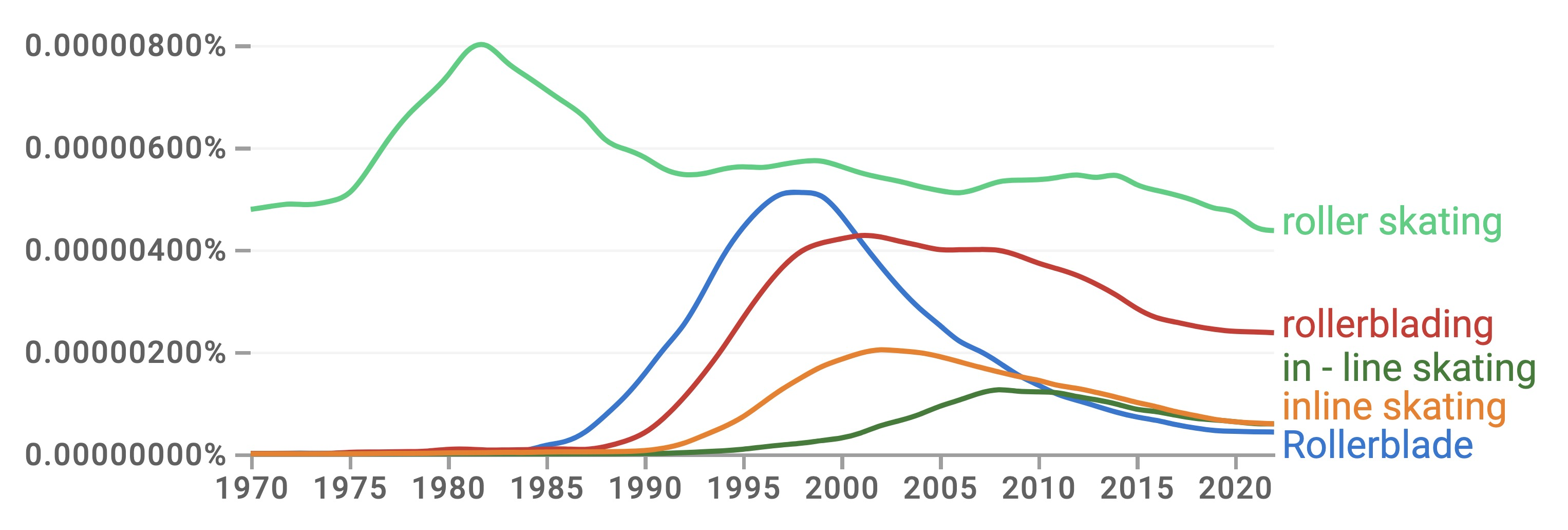
Usage stats of "inline skating" vs rollerblading and roller skating

From 1979 through 1990, when referring to his skates in patent applications, Scott Olson called his skates simply "roller skates", "street skates" or "hockey skates". "Rollerblade", as a trademark, was filed on July 25, 1984, with the USPTO, with a first use date of March 1983. But when promoting them in the early 1980s, "Rollerblade" was often used as a noun for this new type of skate, exclusively sold by Ole's Innovative Sports. For instance, the 1985 book edited by Chris Middlebrook and published by the company, was titled Rollerblades: Dryland Training for Ice Hockey, with a plural "Rollerblades". The Oxford English Dictionary dates the earliest printed uses of "Rollerblade" to the publication of the trademark in 1985 by the USPTO Gazette, and to this 1985 book.

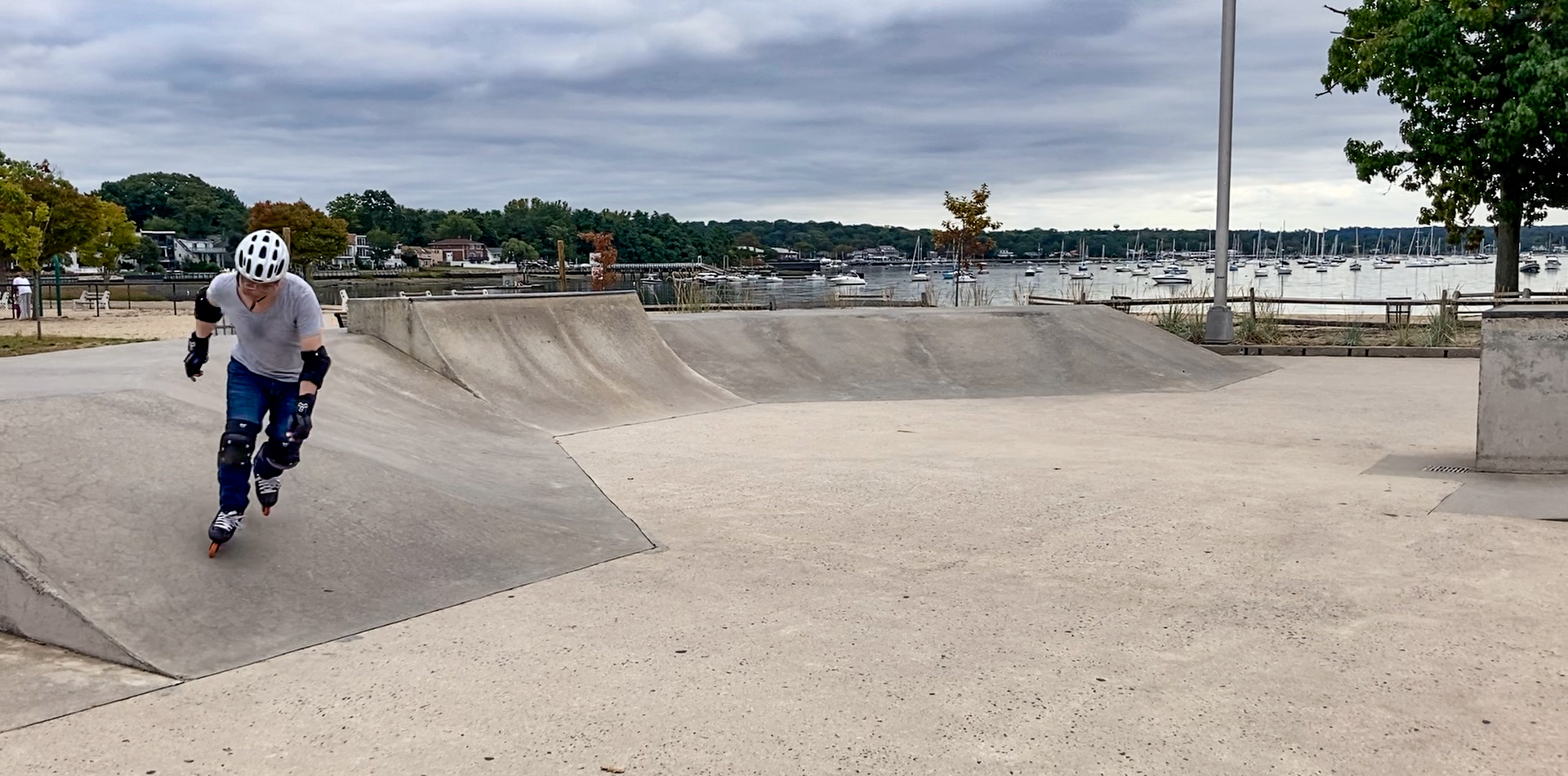
Rollerblading at a skate park

By the late 1980s, Rollerblade, as a company, started to relabel roller skating of this style as "in-line", in order to preempt "rollerblading" from becoming a new verb. This was reflected in Brennan Olson's 1987 patent, which he titled "In-line roller skate with frame".

By 1990, newspapers and the media had generally adopted "in-line skating" as the name of this new recreational sport. In 1991, Rollerblade Inc. used "in-line" in the subtitle of its official guidebook Wheel Excitement: "Official Rollerblade® Guide to In-Line Skating". In the same year, "Rollerblade In-Line Skate Association" (RISA) was founded, but quickly changed its name to the International Inline Skating Association (IISA) shortly after.

One of the earliest web-archived pages from Rollerblade Inc. is an Information for Students letter, preserved by Alexa Internet/Internet Archive in 1997. In the letter, Rollerblade headquarters informed students that “there is no such term as Rollerblade or Rollerblades”, emphasizing that “Rollerblade® is a trademarked brand,” and noting that there were over 30 manufacturers of in-line skates.

However, by the peak of inline skating around 1996, the registered trademark "Rollerblade" had become so well known that it entered common usage as a generic trademark.

When comparing modern inline skates to the 2x2 Plimpton roller skates, enthusiasts referred to the latter as "quad skates". But the term "quad skates" never took hold among the masses.
