= List of people from Minneapolis =

The following list mentions notable people who were born in or lived in Minneapolis, Minnesota, in the United States, and gained recognition.

== Academia ==
- Jane M. Bowers - flautist, musicologist and feminist
- Paul H. Cheney - academic
- Sumner McKnight Crosby - art historian and professor of art history at Yale University

== Activists ==
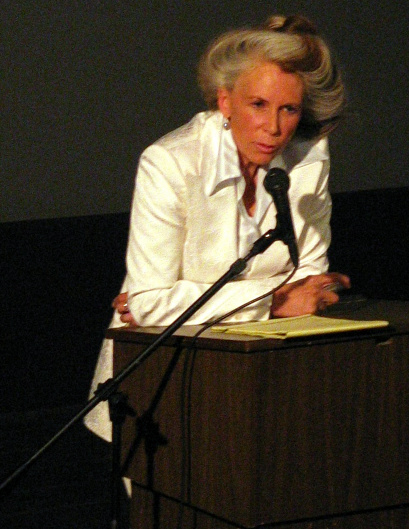
Catharine MacKinnon

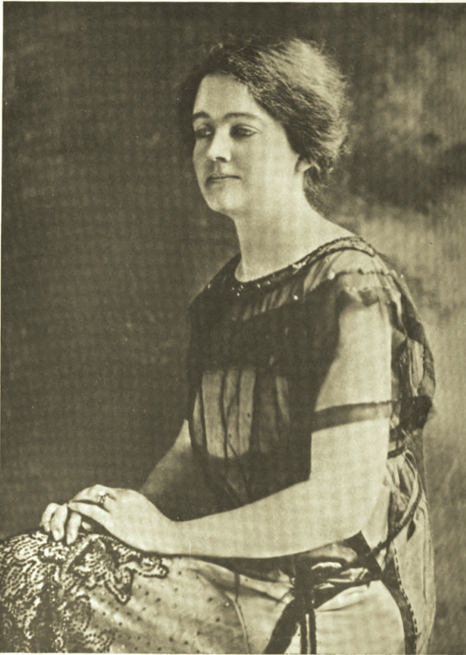
Amy Robbins Ware

- Dennis Banks - Native American leader
- Clyde Bellecourt - Native American leader
- Sharon Sayles Belton - politician
- Brian Coyle - gay rights activist
- W. Harry Davis - civil rights activist
- Paulette Fink - French-born Jewish activist
- Catharine MacKinnon - lawyer and teacher
- David Madson - architect, HIV/AIDS and LGBTQ+ rights activist
- Cecil Newman - publisher, Urban League president
- Sean Sherman - indigenous foods activist
- Amy Robbins Ware - peace activist
- Charlotte S. Winchell - civic leader
- Theodore Wirth - planned the city's park system

== Artists ==
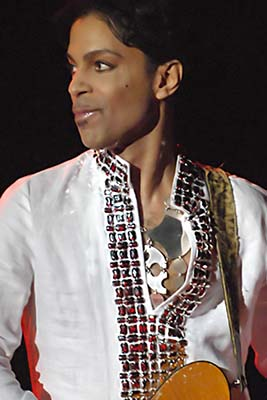
Prince

- Vince Vaughn - actor
- Mary Abbott - artist
- Barkhad Abdi - actor
- Corey Adam - stand-up comedian
- Faysal Ahmed - actor
- Eddie Albert - actor
- Ernest Dewey Albinson - artist
- Richard Dean Anderson - actor
- The Andrews Sisters - singers
- Siah Armajani - sculptor and architect
- James Arness - actor
- Any Austin - YouTuber
- Catherine Backus - sculptor
- Leslie Barlow - visual artist, painting, drawing, mixed media
- Jason Behr - actor
- John Berryman - poet
- Beatrice Gjertsen Bessesen - operatic soprano
- Robert Bly - poet
- David Brisbin - actor
- Steven Brust - novelist
- Hazel Buckham - actress
- Mo Collins - actress and comedian
- Louise Erdrich - novelist
- Clara Elizabeth Fanning - editor
- Craig Finn - singer/songwriter
- Suzanne Finstad, author
- Alice Frost - actress, radio star
- Larry Gates - actor
- Terry Gilliam - director and member of Monty Python
- Peter Graves - actor
- Daniel Grodnik - writer/movie producer
- Molly Hagan - actress
- Carol M. Highsmith - photographer
- George Roy Hill - director
- James Hong - actor
- Dakota Dave Hull - musician
- Mason Jennings - musician
- Dory Kahalé - electronic musician and DJ
- Linda Kelsey - actress
- Ward Kimball - Walt Disney animator
- T. R. Knight - actor
- June Lang - actress
- Jimmy Jam and Terry Lewis - musicians
- Maud Hart Lovelace - author
- Carl Lumbly - actor
- Dorothy Lyman - actress, director, producer
- Cornell MacNeil - of the Metropolitan Opera
- Ralph Meeker - actor
- Michael J. Nelson - comedian
- Ade Olufeko - digital artist
- George Morrison - artist
- Alex Pareene, editor-in-chief of Gawker
- Westbrook Pegler - journalist
- Prince - musician
- Matt Proxy - musician
- Art Resnick - jazz pianist
- Randy Resnick - musician
- Mary Reynolds - artist
- Prof - musician
- Danny Seagren - puppeteer, actor
- Charles M. Schulz - creator of Charlie Brown and the Peanuts gang
- Lili St. Cyr - stripper
- Brian Setzer - Stray Cats
- Clifford D. Simak - author
- Alfred Skrenda - illustrator
- Jack Smight - filmmaker
- Alec Soth - photographer
- Norman Spencer - musician
- Curt Swan - cartoonist, pencil artist of Superman for D.C. Comics from 1940s to 1980s
- Nick Swardson - actor, comedian
- Bruce Swedien - Grammy Award-winning audio engineer and music producer; known for his work with Quincy Jones and Michael Jackson
- John Szarkowski - photographer, curator, critic
- Maria Cristina Tavera - artist
- Tiny Tim - TV personality
- Michael Todd - producer
- The Jets, band
- Anne Tyler - novelist
- Gerald Vizenor - author
- Paul Westerberg - musician
- Dan Wilson - musician
- Lizz Winstead - comedian, co-creator of The Daily Show

== Business ==
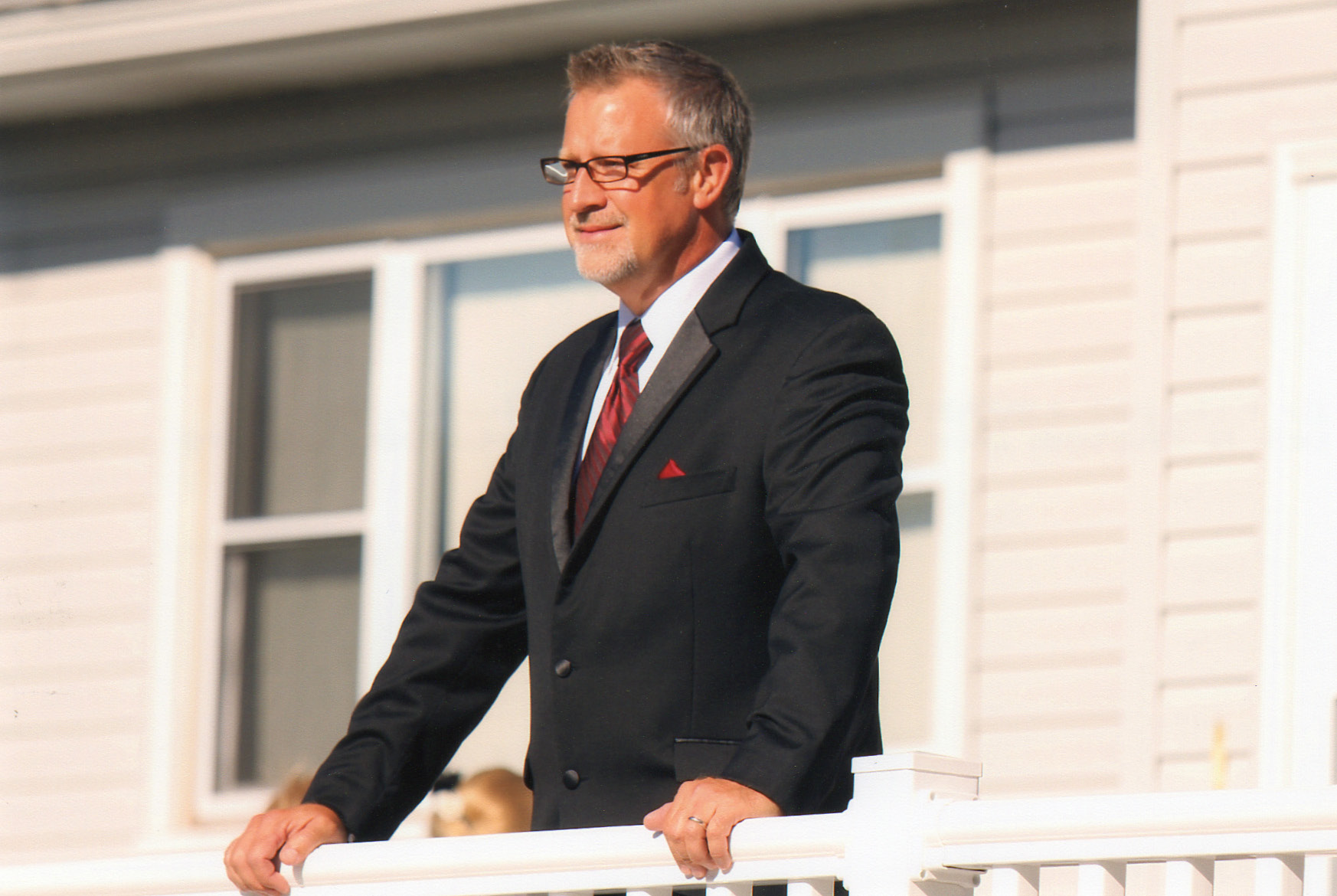
Doron Jensen

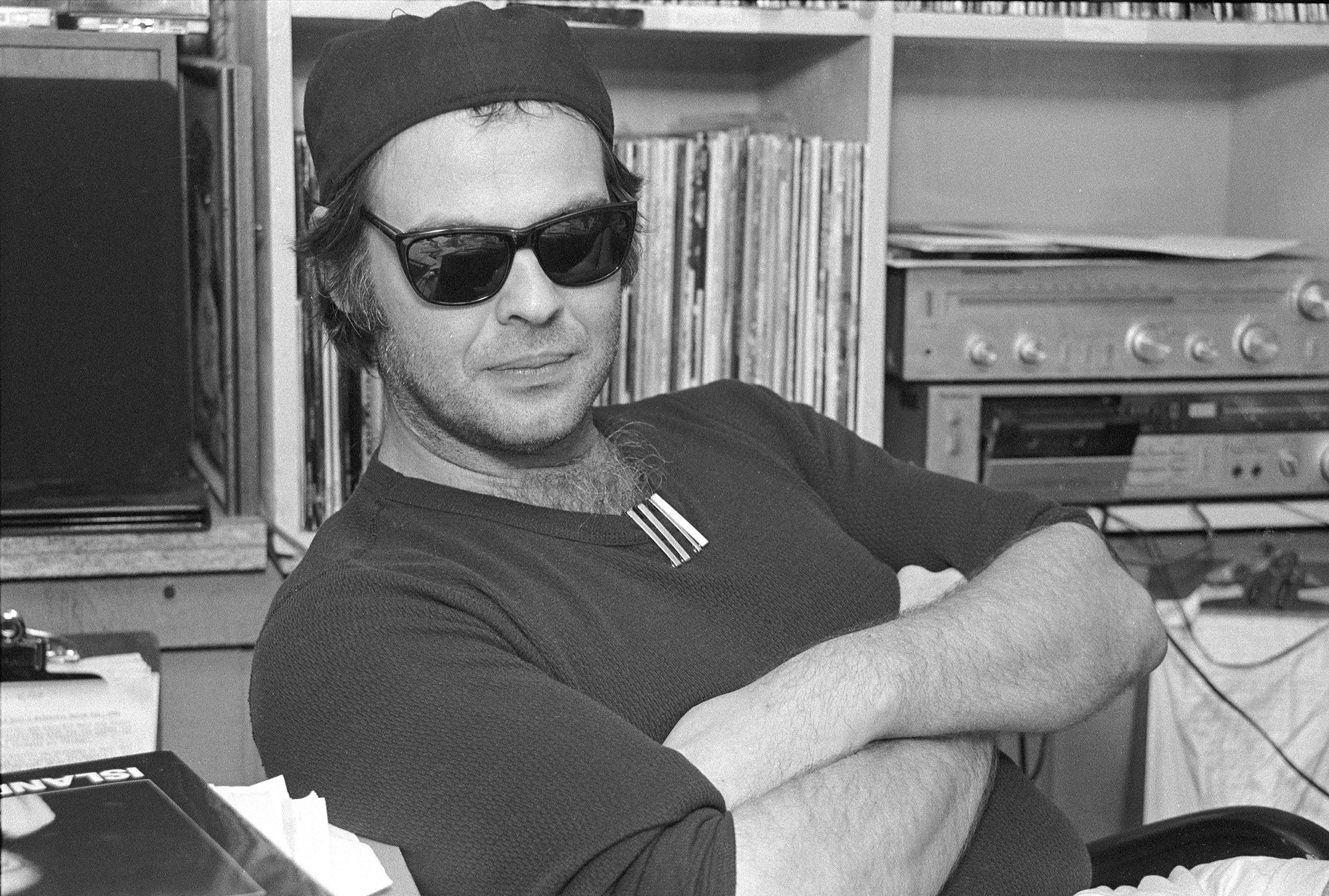
Steve McClellan

- Curt Carlson - founder of Carlson Companies
- George Dayton - founder of Target Corporation
- William Hood Dunwoody - businessman and co-founder General Mills and Wells Fargo
- J. Paul Getty - founder of Getty Oil
- Doron Jensen - co-founder of Timber Lodge Steakhouse and Old Country Buffet
- Franklin and Forrest Mars - founders of Mars, Incorporated
- Steve McClellan - general manager of First Avenue
- Peter Najarian - options trader and television personality
- John S. Pillsbury - co-founder of Pillsbury Company
- Elizabeth Augusta Russell - philanthropist, reformer, restaurateur
- Richard Sears - co-founder of Sears
- Rose Totino - co-founder of Totino's frozen pizza
- Andrew Zimmern - food writer, dining critic, radio talk show host, TV personality and chef

== Government ==
- Hussein Sheikh Abdirahman - politician and judge, former Minister of Defence of Somalia (1989–1990)
- George Edwin Anderson - Minnesota state legislator and businessman
- Marvin Harold Anderson - Minnesota state legislator and businessman
- John R. Arlandson - Minnesota state legislator and lawyer
- Samuel H. Bellman, Minnesota state legislator and lawyer
- Thomas K. Berg - Minnesota state legislator and lawyer
- Alfred L. Bergerud - Minnesota state legislator, businessman, and lawyer
- LeRoy Earl Brophey Sr. - Minnesota state legislator and lawyer
- Margaret Mary Byrne - Minnesota state legislator
- Walter H. Campbell - Minnesota state legislator, businessman, and lawyer
- James R. Casserly - Minnesota state legislator and lawyer
- George C. Dahlvang - Minnesota state representative
- John Cheatham - firefighter
- Mark Dayton - governor of Minnesota
- Calvin Deming - Minnesota state representative
- Philip S. Duff - Minnesota state senator and newspaper editor
- Keith Ellison - Minnesota attorney general, former member of the United States House of Representatives (2003–2019)
- William S. Ervin - former Minnesota Attorney General
- Douglas Ewald - consultant and Minnesota state representative
- George A. French - lawyer and Minnesota state representative
- Paul Willis Guilford - Minnesota state legislator, lawyer, and judge
- Carl G. Hagland - labor activist and Minnesota state representative
- Harold Harrison - businessman and Minnesota state legislator
- Andrew Osborne Hayfield - businessman and Minnesota state representative
- Hubert Humphrey - U.S. vice president
- Robert C. Jensen - Minnesota state legislator and farmer
- Raymond J. Julkowski - Minnesota state representative and lawyer
- Harold Kalina - Minnesota state senator and judge
- Stephen Keefe - Minnesota state senator and chemist
- Burton L. Kingsley - Minnesota state legislator and businessman
- Amy Klobuchar - U.S. senator and Hennepin County attorney
- Herman J. Kording- Minnesota state legislator and farmer
- Adolph Kvam - Minnesota state representative and businessman
- Bob Latz - Minnesota state representative and lawyer
- Ron Latz - Minnesota state senator and lawyer
- John George Lennon - Minnesota state legislator and businessman
- Leonard E. Lindquist - Minnesota state legislator and lawyer
- Carl L. Lyse - Minnesota state legislator and businessman
- Robert George Marshall - Minnesota state senator and businessman
- Eugene McCarthy - U.S. senator
- Betty McCollum - U.S. representative for Minnesota
- Walter Mondale - U.S. vice president
- Kelly Morrison - U.S. representative for Minnesota
- Gerald T. Mullin - Minnesota state legislator, businessman, and lawyer
- George E. Murk - Minnesota state representative
- Dennis Newinski - Minnesota state representative and machinist
- Lauris Norstad - Supreme Commander Europe NATO (the 2nd highest rank by prominence in NATO)
- Harmon T. Ogdahl - Minnesota state senator and businessman
- Ilhan Omar - U.S. representative and former Minnesota state representative
- Alan Page - Minnesota Supreme Court justice; former NFL defensive lineman and Pro Football Hall of Fame inductee
- Wilber L. Paulson - Minnesota state legislator and businessman
- Donna C. Peterson - Minnesota state legislator and educator
- Eric D. Petty - Minnesota state senator and businessman
- Bradley G. Pieper - Minnesota state representative
- Chellie Pingree - U.S. representative for Maine
- Jim Rice - Minnesota state representative
- Charles W. Root - lawyer and politician
- Herman W. Sachtjen - member of the Wisconsin State Assembly and jurist
- Donald Savelkoul - lawyer and politician
- David D. Schaaf - Minnesota state senator and florist
- John Day Smith - Minnesota state legislator, judge, and lawyer
- Tina Smith - U.S. senator and lieutenant governor of Minnesota
- Clifford C. Sommer - Minnesota state senator and businessman
- James C. Swanson - Minnesota state legislator and educator
- Samuel R. Thayer - ambassador to the Netherlands in the Benjamin Harrison administration
- Jesse Ventura - former professional wrestler, actor, and governor of Minnesota
- Carl O. Wegner - lawyer and politician
- Vernon S. Welch - Minnesota state representative and lawyer
- Frank Emerson Wheelock - a founder and first mayor of Lubbock, Texas, reared in Minneapolis
- Bruce D. Williamson - Minnesota state representative
- Edwin M. Wold - Minnesota state representative
- Kenneth W. Wolfe - Minnesota state senator
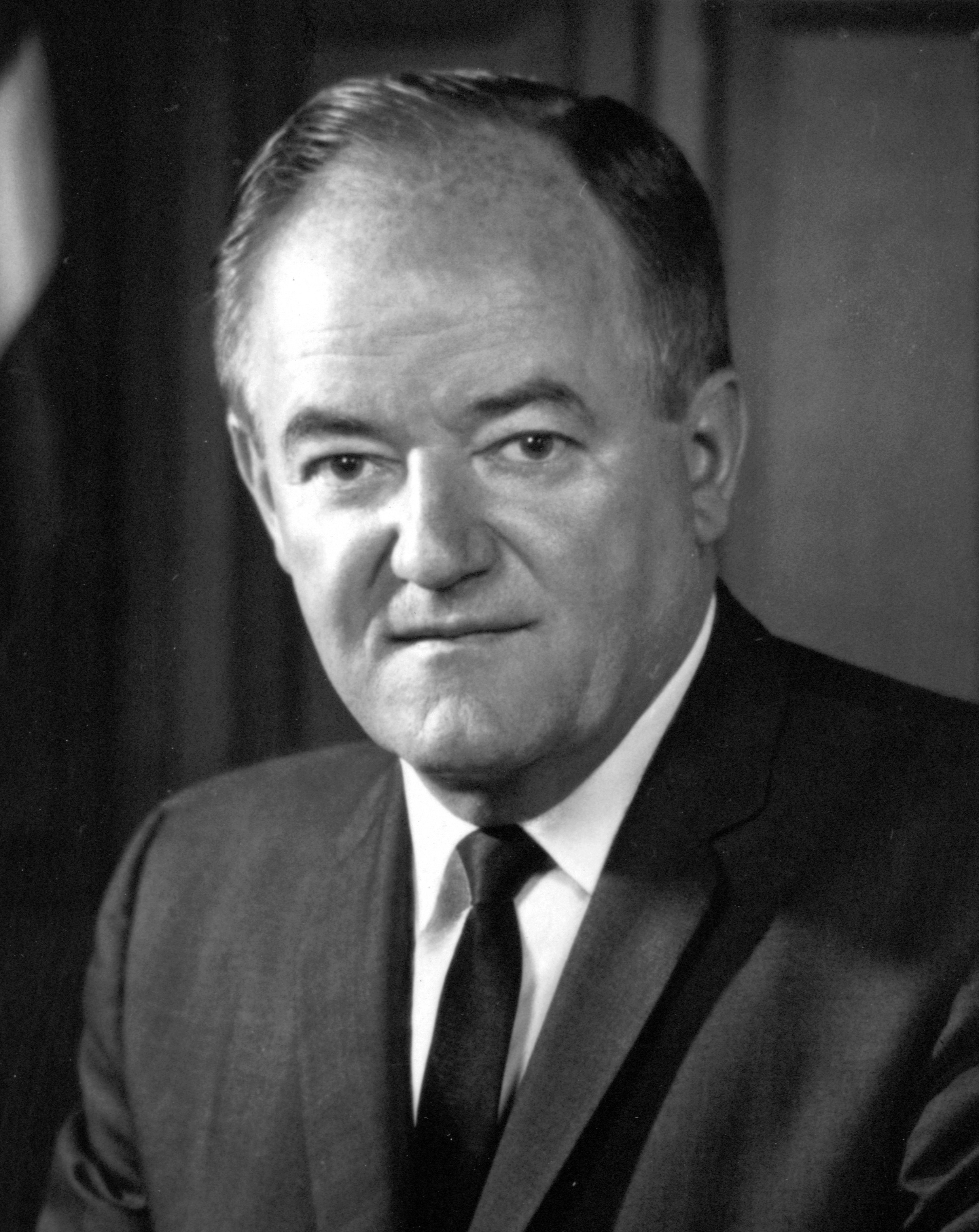
Hubert Humphrey

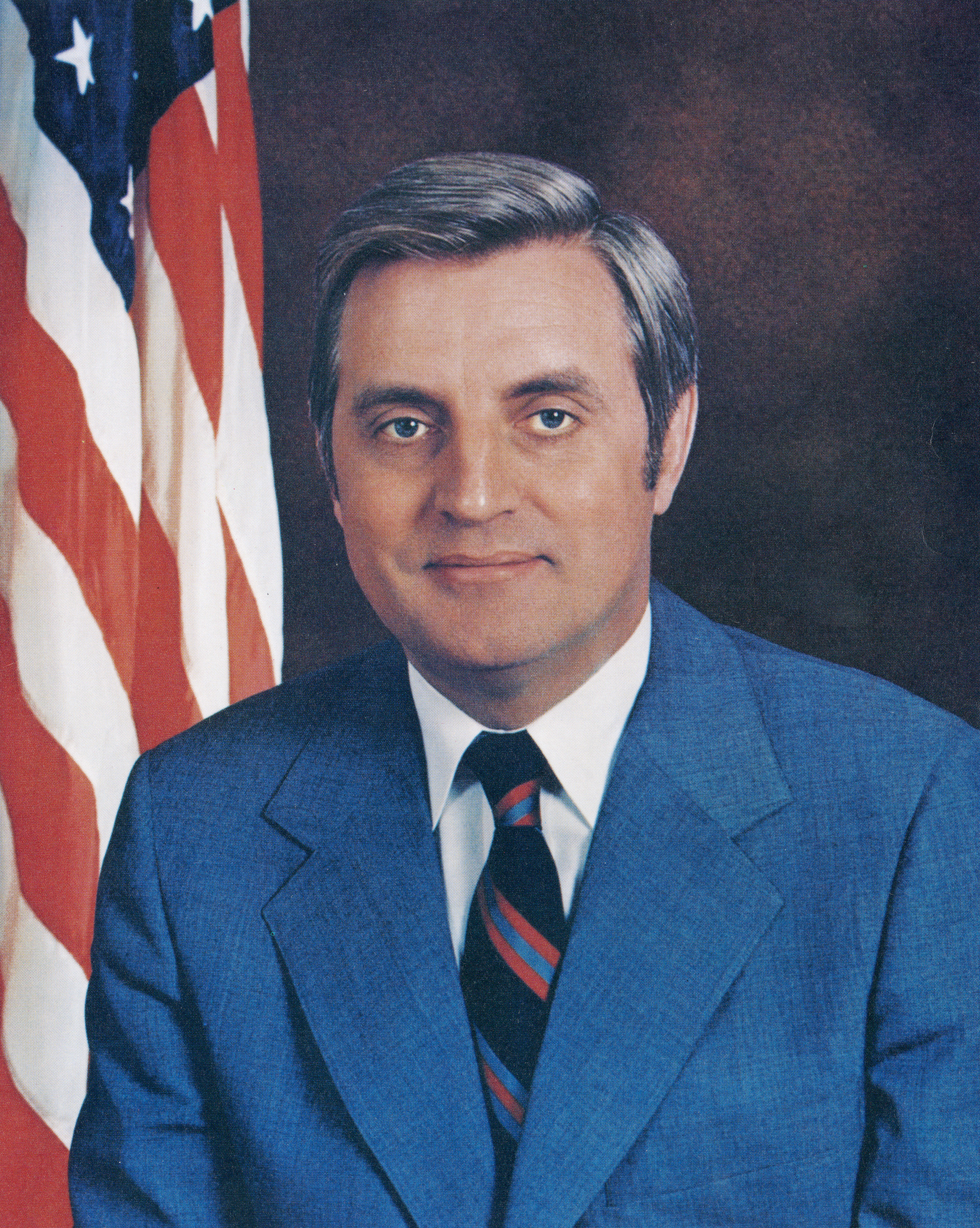
Walter Mondale

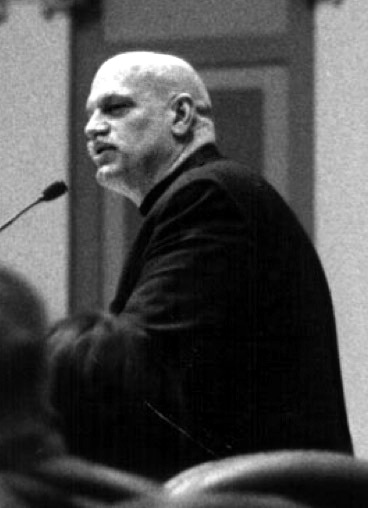
Jesse Ventura

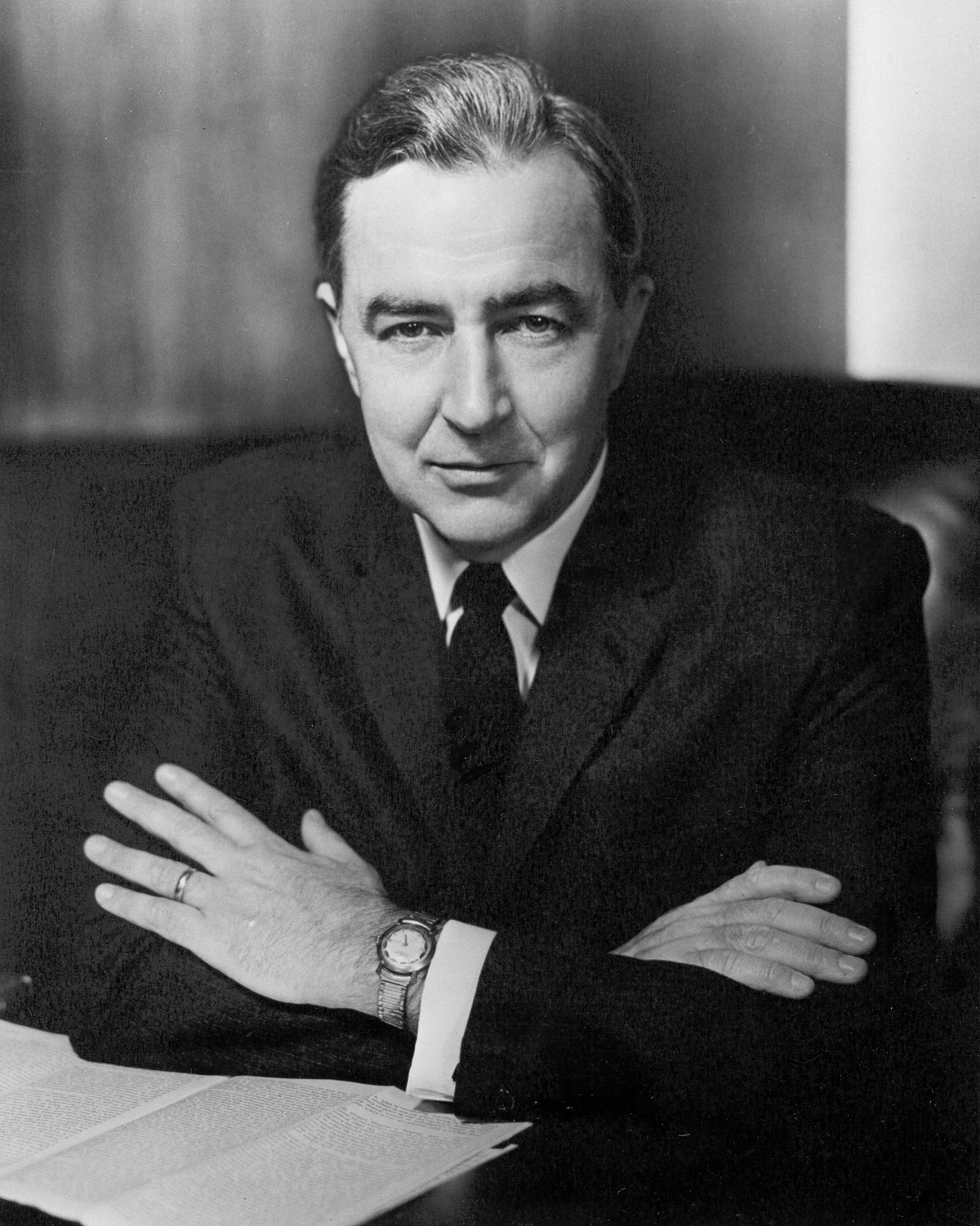
Eugene McCarthy

Alan Page

== Military ==
- Pete Hegseth, television presenter, author, Minnesota National Guard officer, and United States Secretary of Defense
- Harold Palmer Howard, U.S. Army brigadier general
- Jeffrey Trail, U.S. Navy officer (LTJG) and Gulf War veteran

== Science ==
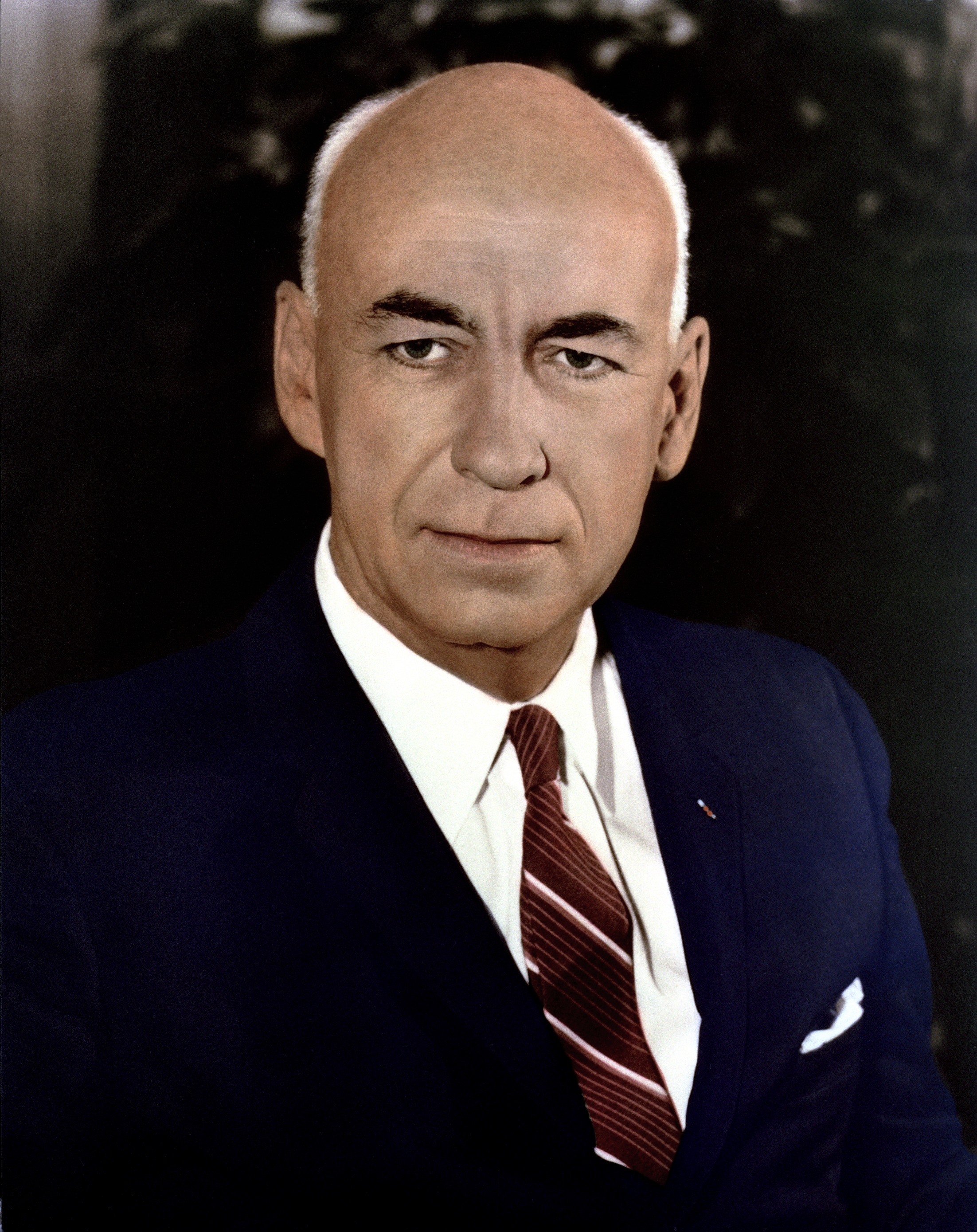
Robert Gilruth

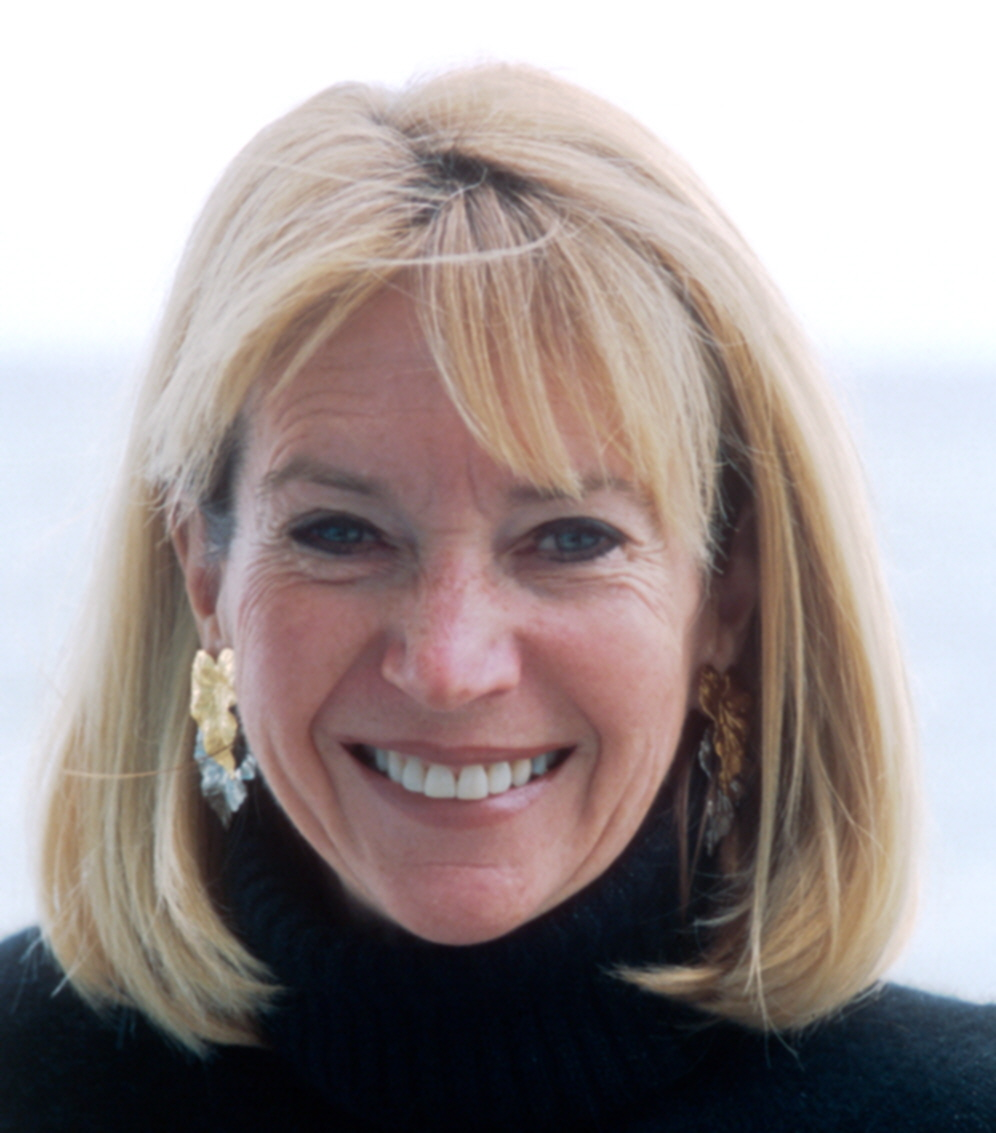
Marcia McNutt

- Peter Agre - physician, biologist, Nobel laureate
- Cynthia Ahearn (1952–2008) - echinodermologist and museum specialist
- Earl Bakken - engineer, philanthropist
- Norman Borlaug - agronomist
- Paul D. Boyer - chemist, Nobel laureate
- Ian Coldwater - computer security specialist
- Robert R. Gilruth - directed the U.S. Moon landing
- Leonid Hurwicz - economist, academician
- Finn E. Kydland - economist
- Edward B. Lewis - geneticist, Nobel Prize winner
- C. Walton Lillehei - surgeon, open-heart pioneer, Recipient of Bronze Star Medal and Order of Health Merit Jose Fernandez Madrid
- Marcia McNutt - president National Academy of Sciences
- Bradford Parkinson - "father" of the Global Positioning System
- Jeannette Piccard - pioneer of balloonists
- Edward C. Prescott - economist, Nobel Prize
- John Tate - mathematician

== Sports ==
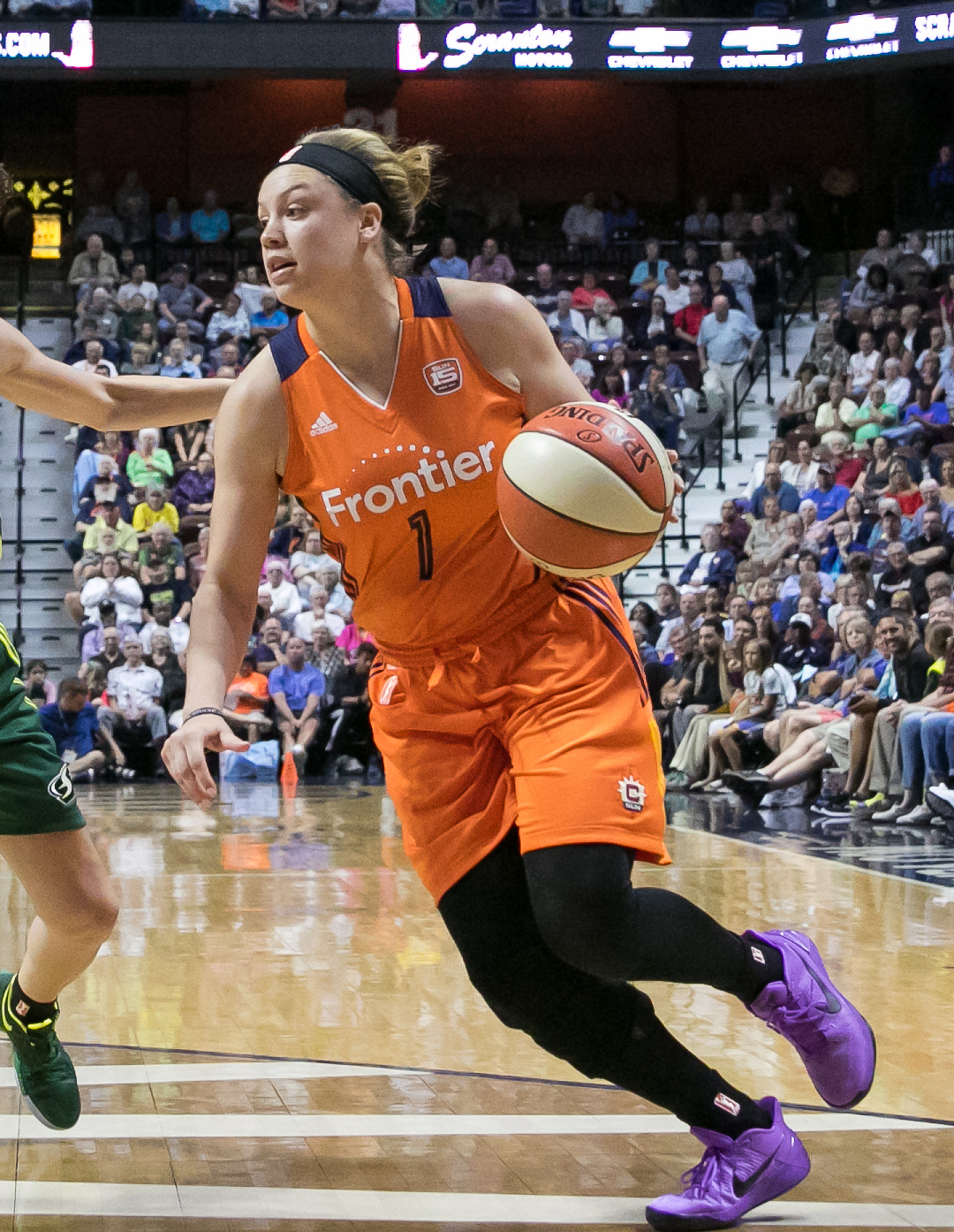
Rachel Banham

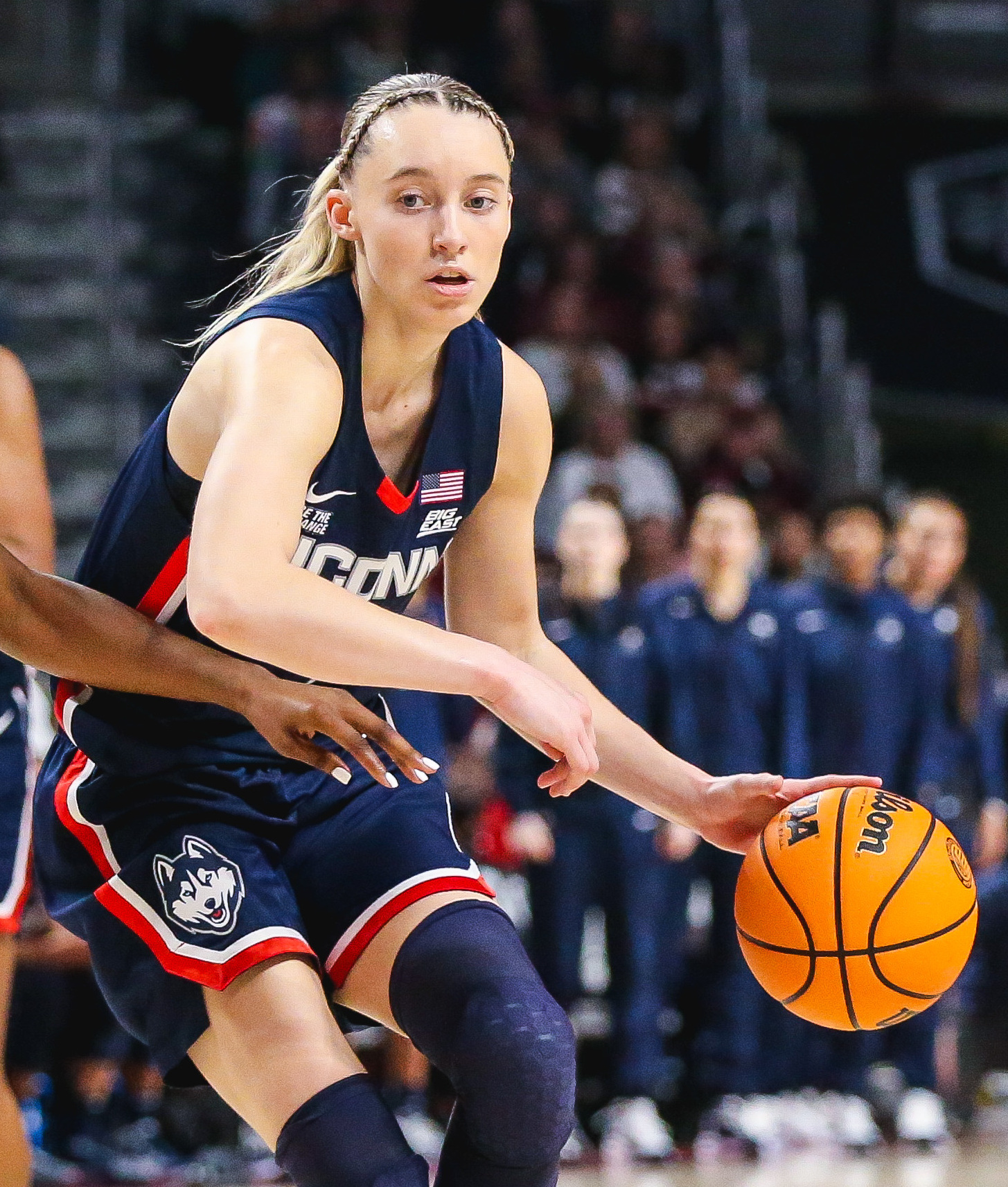
Paige Bueckers

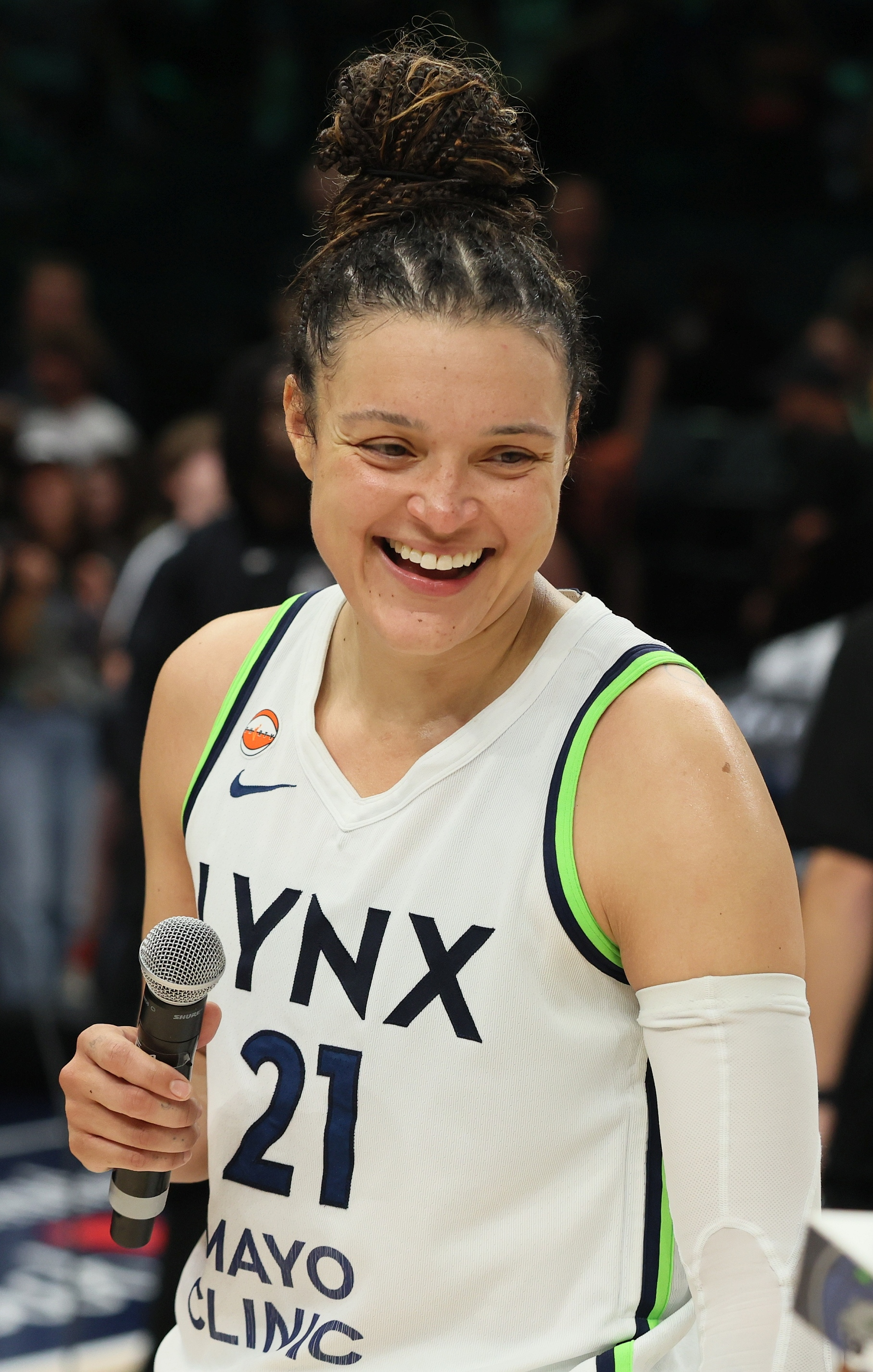
Kayla McBride

- Mukwelle Akale - soccer player
- Andrew Alberts - National Hockey League player
- Russ Anderson - National Hockey League player
- Sacar Anim (born 1997) - basketball player in the Israeli Basketball Premier League
- Nate Augspurger - rugby player
- David Backes - National Hockey League player
- Rachel Banham - professional basketball player
- Garrett Bender - rugby union player
- Casey Borer - National Hockey League player
- Rebekkah Brunson - basketball player and coach
- Brady Bryant - soccer player and coach
- Dustin Byfuglien - National Hockey League player
- Izzy Daniel - Professional Women's Hockey League player
- Dominique Byrd - professional football player
- Geno Crandall - basketball player with Hapoel Be'er Sheva in the Israeli Basketball Premier League
- Cully Dahlstrom - National Hockey League player
- Jessie Diggins - cross-country skier
- Birdie Draper - parachutist and stunt performer
- Joe Dziedzic - National Hockey League player
- Chad Erickson - National Hockey League player
- Larry Fitzgerald - professional football player
- Rusty Fitzgerald - National Hockey League player
- David Flair (born David Fliehr) - professional wrestler
- Jake Gardiner - National Hockey League player
- Gabriele Grunewald - professional runner
- Brad Hand - Major League Baseball pitcher
- Pudge Heffelfinger - football player
- Joe Hennig - professional wrestler
- Chet Holmgren - Oklahoma City Thunder C
- Kent Hrbek - Major League Baseball player
- Janet Jamieson - All-American Girls Professional Baseball League player
- Tom Kurvers - National Hockey League player
- Reed Larson - National Hockey League player
- Brock Lesnar - professional wrestler and mixed martial artist
- Butch Levy - NFL football player, NCAA champion amateur wrestler, and professional wrestler
- Ryan Lindgren - National Hockey League player
- Kayla McBride - professional basketball player
- Dave Menne - mixed martial artist
- Chris Middlebrook - bandy player and official
- Brock Nelson - National Hockey League player
- Zach Parise - National Hockey League player
- Nick Perbix - National Hockey League player
- David Roddy - basketball player for Hapoel Jerusalem of the Israeli Basketball Premier League, formerly NBA player
- Paul Sather - college men's basketball coach
- Briana Scurry - Women's World Cup winner, Olympic gold medalist, retired professional soccer player, and first female goalkeeper in the National Soccer Hall of Fame
- Kyle Shanahan - football coach
- Tom Shevlin - Yale track athlete and football captain
- Bob Stein - NFL linebacker, College Football Hall of Fame, Super Bowl champion
- Jalen Suggs - Orlando Magic PG / SG
- Terrell Suggs - Kansas City Chiefs defensive end / linebacker
- Matt Tennyson - National Hockey League player
- John Thomas (born 1975) - basketball player
- Marc Trestman - college football quarterback, NFL coach
- Hal Trumble - ice hockey administrator and referee
- Taylor Twellman - former soccer player and MLS commentator
- Lyle Wright - businessman, events promoter, United States Hockey Hall of Fame inductee
- Paige Bueckers - pro basketball player
- Jordan Thompson (volleyball) - pro volleyball player

== See also ==
- List of people from Minnesota
