= Gabriele Grunewald =

American athlete (1986–2019)

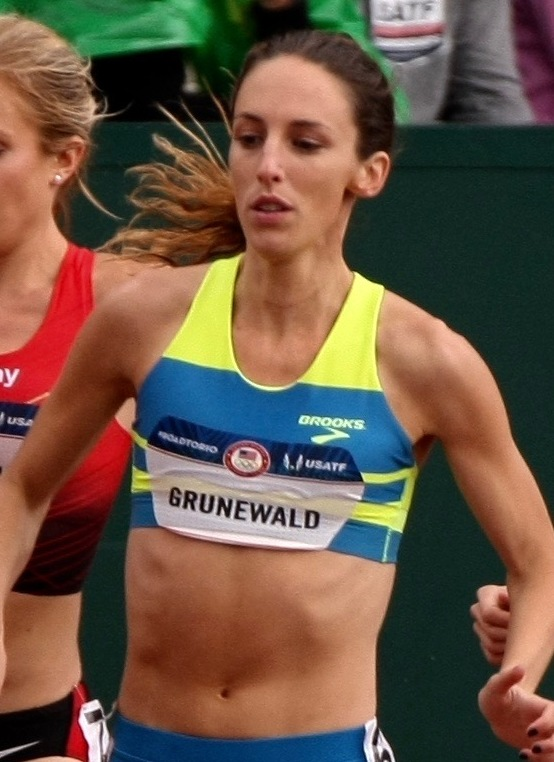
- Grunewald in 2016

Personal information
- Born: Gabriele Ivy Anderson; June 25, 1986 Perham, Minnesota, U.S.
- Died: June 11, 2019 (aged 32) Minneapolis, Minnesota, U.S.
- Height: 5 ft 6 in (1.68 m)

Sport
- Country: United States
- Sport: Athletics
- Event(s): 800 m, 1500 m, Mile run, 3000 m, 5000 m
- College team: University of Minnesota Golden Gophers
- Club: Brooks
- Turned pro: 2010

Achievements and titles
- Personal best(s): 800 m: 2:01.38; 1500 m: 4:01.48; Mile: 4:27.94; 3000 m: 8:42.64; 5000 m: 15:19.01

Gabriele Ivy Grunewald (née Anderson; June 25, 1986 – June 11, 2019) was an American professional middle-distance runner who competed in distances from 800 meters to 5000 meters. She represented the United States at the 2014 IAAF World Indoor Championships and finished in ninth place in the 3000 meters. Grunewald was the national champion in the 3000 meters at the 2014 USA Indoor Track and Field Championships.

== Early life ==
Grunewald was born in Perham, Minnesota to Kim and Laura Anderson. She competed for the University of Minnesota where she was national runner-up in the 1500 meters at the 2010 NCAA Division I Outdoor Track and Field Championships.

== Professional career ==
Grunewald turned professional in 2010, signing a contract with Brooks Sports. In 2011, she placed third nationally in the mile run both indoors and outdoors.

Over 1500 m, she was fourth at the 2012 United States Olympic Trials missing the Olympic Team by one place.

Grunewald placed 11th in the 1500 m final at 2013 USA Outdoor Track and Field Championships.

Grunewald was the 2014 USA Indoor 3000 m champion. She was briefly disqualified on appeal from Jordan Hasay’s coach Alberto Salazar that was based on contact Grunewald had with Hasay during the finals; however, Hasay later withdrew the appeal made on her behalf and Grunewald was reinstated as champion and awarded her World Championships berth. She would finish 9th at the World Championships.

Grunewald placed 13th in 1500 m final at 2015 USA Outdoor Track and Field Championships.

Grunewald placed 3rd at 2016 USATF 1 Mile Road Championships and 12th in 1500 m final at 2016 United States Olympic Trials (track and field).

In what would be her final professional race, Grunewald ran 4:31.18 and placed 28th in 1500 m semi-final at 2017 USA Outdoor Track and Field Championships in 100-degree heat, in between chemotherapy treatments, and having had a fever just days before the race.

== Personal life ==
In 2013, Grunewald married Justin Grunewald, an internal medicine physician whom she first met while they were both students at the University of Minnesota. In 2017, Brooks released Gabe (her nickname), a 26-minute documentary film depicting her battle with cancer as well as her efforts to qualify for the 2017 World Championships. Grunewald had four siblings: three brothers (Ben, Caleb, and Zach) and a sister (Abigail); her sister was killed in a drunk-driving crash in August 2021, on her way to attending a women's soccer game in Falcon Heights, Minnesota.

== Illness and death ==
Grunewald was diagnosed with adenoid cystic carcinoma, a rare type of cancer, in 2009. Due to tumors, her salivary gland was removed in 2009 and her thyroid was removed two years later. She had surgery to remove a roughly five-by-six-inch cancerous tumor from her liver on August 26, 2016; a surgical oncologist performed a right hepatectomy to remove the tumor as well as the affected right lobe of her liver. In 2017, Grunewald suffered a relapse, with a PET scan revealing 12 small, inoperable tumors in her liver. In 2018, she founded the organization Brave Like Gabe to fund research and raise awareness surrounding rare cancers through local races.

Grunewald died in palliative care on June 11, 2019, two weeks before her 33rd birthday.

== Personal bests ==
Outdoor track
Distance	Time	Place	Date
800 meters	2:01.38	Eugene, OR	May 31, 2013
1500 meters	4:01.48	Monaco	July 19, 2013
One mile	4:27.9	Falmouth, MA	August 11, 2012
3000 meters	8:42.64	London (OP)	July 26, 2013
5000 meters	15:19.01	Palo Alto, CA	April 4, 2015

Indoor track
Distance	Time	Place	Date
1500 meters	4:12.8	Glasgow (Emirates Arena)	January 25, 2014
One mile	4:36.6	Albuquerque, NM	February 27, 2011
3000 meters	8:53.9	New York (Armory), NY	February 15, 2014
Two miles	9:55.2	Boston (Roxbury), MA	February 8, 2014

Road races
Distance	Time	Place	Date
One mile	4:21.3	Duluth, Minnesota; Minnesota Mile	September 9, 2013

== See also ==
- Sportspeople who died during their careers
- List of people from Minneapolis
- List of people from Minnesota
