= Roosevelt High School (Minnesota) =

High school in Minnesota, US

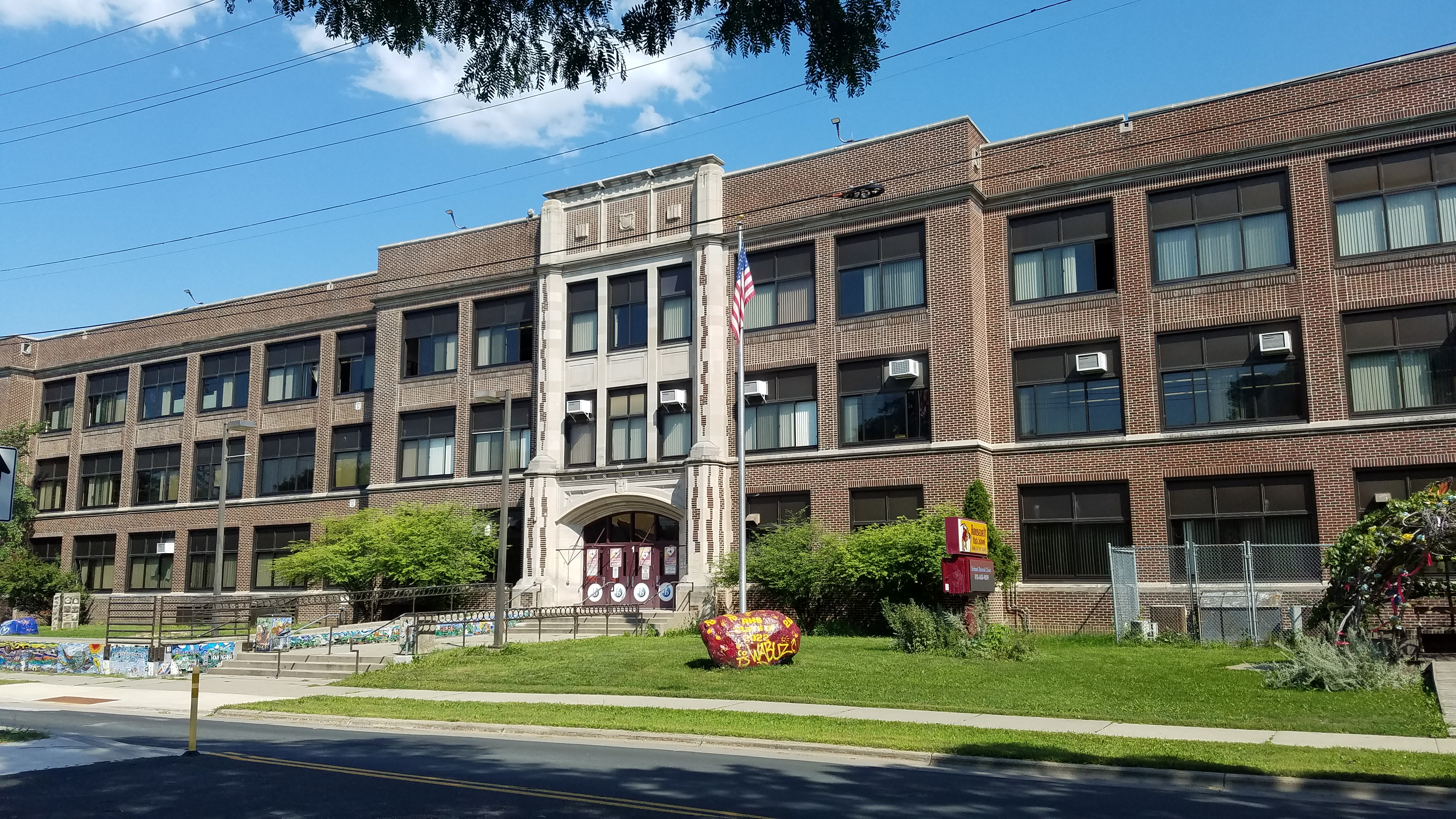
- Roosevelt from 28th Avenue South in 2022

Location
- 4029 28th Avenue South; Minneapolis, Minnesota 55406; United States; 44.9297°N 93.2314°W

Information
- Type: Public secondary
- Established: 1923
- School district: Minneapolis Public Schools
- Principal: Christian Alberto Ledesma
- Faculty: 126
- Teaching staff: 77.80 (FTE)
- Grades: 9–12
- Enrollment: 1,148 (2024-2025)
- Student to teacher ratio: 14.76
- Campus: Urban
- Colors: Maroon and gold
- Nickname: Teddies
- Website: roosevelt.mpls.k12.mn.us

Roosevelt High School is a four-year comprehensive public high school located in the Standish neighborhood of Minneapolis, Minnesota. It is part of the Minneapolis Public Schools district and is named after Theodore Roosevelt, the 26th president of the United States. Athletic and other competition teams from the school are nicknamed the Teddies. Roosevelt has been an International Baccalaureate World School since March 2010, and offers the Diploma Programme as well as the IB Career-related Certificate.

== History ==
On January 7, 2026, officers from the Border Patrol, among them senior official Gregory Bovino, entered school property allegedly in pursuit of a suspect who had rammed his vehicle into a government vehicle during "immigration enforcement operations" as students were being dismissed from classes. Teachers from the school reportedly confronted the Border Patrol officers and told them to stay off school property and away from the students. Some teachers, students, and parents ended up in scuffles with Border Patrol officers.

After the incident, the Department of Homeland Security (DHS) issued a statement in which they claimed an individual who identified themselves as a teacher had assaulted a Border Patrol agent, and that a crowd of people formed and "threw objects and dispersed paint on the officers and their vehicles". The DHS said that Border Patrol officers were forced to use "targeted crowd control" in response to the "rioters". The Minneapolis Federation of Teachers said that a teacher was arrested and later released, and that Border Patrol agents had deployed tear gas against faculty and students at the school, a claim which the DHS denied. The suspect who the Border Patrol was pursuing was arrested and identified as a US citizen. As a result of the incident and the killing of Renée Good the same day by an Immigration and Customs Enforcement officer, Minneapolis Public Schools closed all schools across Minneapolis until the following Monday.

Upon returning to class on Monday, students staged a walkout protest against federal immigration enforcement in the area. Students reportedly marched for about an hour and a half around the school before dispersing.

== Notable alumni ==
- Barkhad Abdi — actor
- Peter Agre — molecular biologist
- Marvin Harold Anderson — former Minnesota state senator
- Medaria Arradondo — chief of the Minneapolis Police Department
- Linda Berglin — Minnesota senator
- Ray Christensen — sportscaster
- Ken Exel — former professional basketball player
- Darnella Frazier — 2021 Pulitzer Prize recipient
- Fortune Gordien — discus thrower
- Dan Hall — former member of the Minnesota Senate
- Lloyd Hollingsworth — former head sports coach (football, basketball, baseball, ice hockey)
- Wally Kersten — former NFL offensive tackle
- Joe Kraker — former NFL offensive guard
- Bill Kuusisto — former NFL offensive guard
- Reed Larson — former National Hockey League defenseman
- Marcus LeVesseur (attended) — wrestler; professional mixed martial artist in the UFC
- Bob Lindberg — former professional hockey player
- John Linsley — physicist
- Sammy Morgan — retired professional Mixed Martial Artist
- Larry Munson — collegiate and professional sportscaster
- Ronald Naslund — Olympic ice hockey silver medalist
- Gail Omvedt — Indian sociologist and human rights activist
- Lloyd Parsons — former NFL halfback
- Mike Ramsey — former National Hockey League defenseman
- Don Riley — sportswriter
- James Rosenquist — artist
- Robert Sheran — former chief justice, Minnesota Supreme Court
- Don Smith — former Basketball Association of America forward
- Winston Boogie Smith — homicide victim
- Charles Stenvig — former mayor of Minneapolis
- David C. Sutherland III — artist
- John Thomas — former professional basketball forward
- Jesse Ventura — professional wrestler, 38th governor of Minnesota, and actor
- John William Vessey Jr. (attended) — United States Army general, tenth chairman of the Joint Chiefs of Staff
