= DeLaSalle High School =

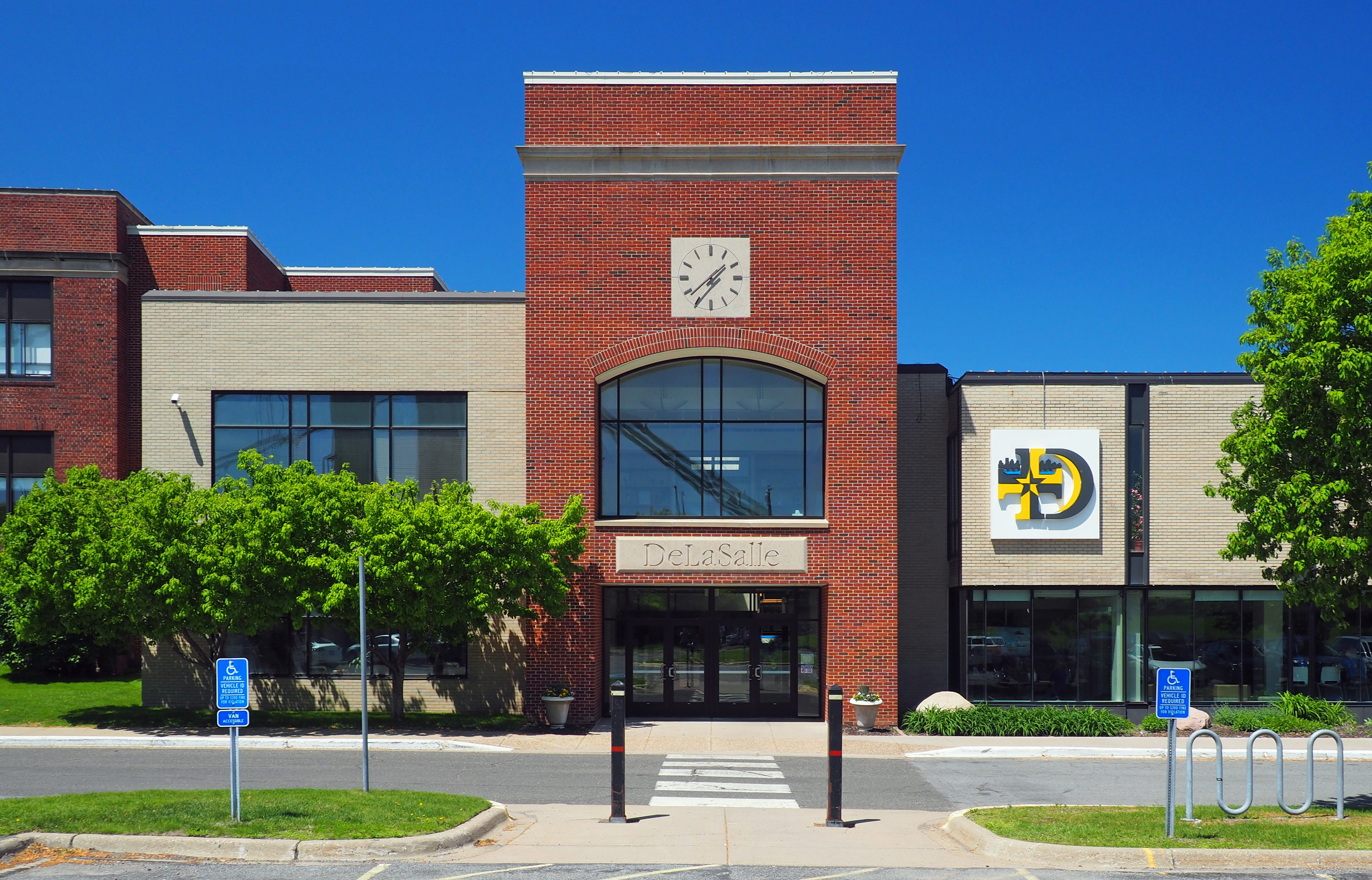
- New main entrance and offices of the school

Location
- One DeLaSalle Drive Nicollet Island; Minneapolis, (Hennepin County), Minnesota 55401-1500 USA; 44°59′12″N 93°15′47″W

Information
- School type: Private, Coeducational
- Religious affiliation: Catholic (De La Salle Brothers)
- Established: 1900; 126 years ago
- Founder: St. John Baptist de La Salle
- President: Patrick Felicetta ‘01
- Principal: Brian Edel
- Grades: 9–12
- Gender: Co-ed
- Enrollment: 700 (2023–24)
- Classes offered: Day-class
- Campus: Urban
- Colors: Black and Gold
- Slogan: Islanders Are Everywhere
- Athletics conference: Tri-Metro Conference
- Team name: Islanders
- Rival: Totino-Grace Eagles
- Accreditation: AdvancED / North Central Association of Colleges and Schools
- Newspaper: The Islander
- Yearbook: The Delta
- Website: http://www.delasalle.com

DeLaSalle High School (/ˌdiːləˈsæl/ DEE-lə-SAL) is a Catholic, college preparatory high school in Minneapolis, Minnesota. It is located on Nicollet Island.

== History ==
DeLaSalle opened in 1900 and has been administered by the De La Salle Brothers (French Christian Brothers) throughout its history. The school's current president is Patrick Felicetta. Enrollment peaked at 1654 boys in 1964, dropped to the range of 400–500 by the early 1970s despite the 1971–72 advent of co-education, and continued to decline to a 70-year low of 306 in 1991. Over the past two decades DeLaSalle's enrollment has climbed, and the school now receives an average of 400 applications each year for ninth grade admission. Strategic plans from 2000, 2007, 2012 and 2017 are based upon an optimum overall enrollment of 650–700 students.

Then-Archbishop John Ireland helped raise money in the late 1800s to build the new Catholic secondary school in Minneapolis. Ireland's goal was to provide education to sons of immigrants who were moving into Minneapolis neighborhoods from many European countries. Only a few months after groundbreaking, the "DeLaSalle Institute" building was ready for occupancy. Fifty boys joined three teaching Christian Brothers in the new school in October 1900. The number of pupils rapidly expanded, and by spring, a fourth Brother had arrived to handle the overcrowding. By 1907, an addition had been added to the original building, and in 1914, the Archdiocese, at Archbishop Ireland's direction, purchased the adjoining King property to provide space for eventual expansion. Enrollment stood at 352 boys.

In those early days, DeLaSalle was a commercial school. Through the work of Brother Hercules, the first graduating class, 13 members strong in 1903, all received positions with the leading business firms of Minneapolis before graduating.

By 1920, parents were calling for a high school that was primarily college preparatory. So Archbishop Dowling, Ireland's successor, went to all Minneapolis parishes to raise the $200,000 needed to build a new high school on the former King property, adjacent to the existing commercial building. Construction began in May 1922, and within a year, the new DeLaSalle High School building (today known as the "B Building") had opened. Within six years, DeLaSalle was accredited as college preparatory by both the University of Minnesota and the North Central Association of Colleges and Secondary Schools. (More than eight decades later, the school is still accredited by AdvancEd, the successor to North Central.)

By 1950, enrollment was growing significantly each year, so much so that ninth graders were being educated in a separate building at West 43rd Street and Wentworth Avenue in south Minneapolis. The school's administration opened a new residence for the Christian Brothers in 1950, facing Grove Street on the back side of the DeLaSalle campus. In 1960, in order to "bring the freshmen back to the Island," the school opened the third classroom building on campus (today known as the "A building"). The original school building stood until February 1971, when a weekend electrical fire damaged much of the structure. Because enrollment was dropping precipitously at the time, the original building was razed and not replaced.

In order to meet emerging educational and facility needs for a growing student body, in 2014 the DeLaSalle Board of Trustees authorized the construction of a new building. With funds and pledges raised from an ongoing five-year capital campaign run by the school's president, Barry Lieske, and the development office staff, DeLaSalle opened the new "D building" when the 2016–17 school year began. The centerpiece of the project is the "Center for Innovative Learning," new learning spaces providing teachers and students enhanced educational technology and facilities that integrate more efficiently with the tablet- and cloud-technology used by all students. Within the project's scope, DeLaSalle also was able to replace decades-old boiler and electrical systems, improve the energy efficiency of the entire campus, enhance traffic circulation with new corridors and a new north-side entry, and relocate athletic and theatre / fine arts functions closer to the gymnasiums, athletic field, and auditorium respectively.

In the Strategic Plan of 1993 the school focused its curriculum only on college preparatory classes, in large part to maximize resources that could be available for financial assistance for families. To this day, graduation requirements mirror typical college entrance requirements, plus requirements for completion of Christian Service hours and Theology coursework. Placement is available in one of two levels within a department: Honors/Advanced Placement or regular college prep, with 13 different AP courses available to students. Since 2000, over 68 percent of each graduating class has matriculated to college. De graduates are enrolled in colleges in 36 states.

The school was founded to provide a Catholic school option to poor and immigrant families (primarily European) moving into Minneapolis in the late 19th century. This mission continues to this day, to provide a Catholic and college preparatory education to students from all family and socio-economic backgrounds. The school provides over $3.0 million of financial assistance to assist 53 percent of its students with reduced tuition. In addition to its socio-economic diversity, DeLaSalle is the most diverse Catholic School in the state of Minnesota as measured by almost all demographic areas: 45% of its students are people of color, 35% matriculate from single-parent households, and 33% have been raised in faiths other than Catholic.

The student body of 760 is drawn from over 120 parochial and public grade schools across the Twin Cities. Over 85 students were born in other countries, some attending DeLaSalle because of its proximity to the University of Minnesota. DeLaSalle has launched an innovative Global Advantage Program, partnering with Hamline University, St. Mary's University, St. Catherine's University, and the University of Minnesota in areas of international academic travel and student exchange experiences.

DeLaSalle is one of 13 Catholic high schools in the Twin Cities, one of two within the city limits of Minneapolis.

== Sports and activities ==
Over 90 percent of DeLaSalle students participate in at least one school activity each year, and more than 75 percent will join two or more. Academic, fine arts, athletic and leadership/service groups and teams all are available to students. The largest activities in terms of participation are theatre (six productions each year), music (both vocal and instrumental programs), and Lasallian "Campus" Ministry.

Since 2000, teams or individuals from DeLaSalle have qualified for participation in the MSHSL's championship tournaments in speech, one-act play, boys' and girls' basketball, football, boys' soccer, boys' and girls' track-and-field, wrestling, cross country, and baseball. DeLaSalle students have succeeded in other programs not directed by the MSHSL, including competitive cheer (eight state titles), Quiz Bowl (eleven straight years qualifying for the National Championships), and musical theatre (20 group or individual awards earned in the annual Spotlight Program of the Hennepin Theatre Trust in 2017). Of note, nearly 45 percent of the students are in a music program, one of three bands, two choirs or orchestra.

DeLaSalle is a member of the Tri-Metro Conference, a mix of private and public high schools throughout the Twin Cities that sponsors competitions, leadership programs, and other collaborative activities.

Over its history, several dozen DeLaSalle alums have continued to participate in college athletic and arts programs, many with scholarship support from their colleges.

== Notable alumni ==
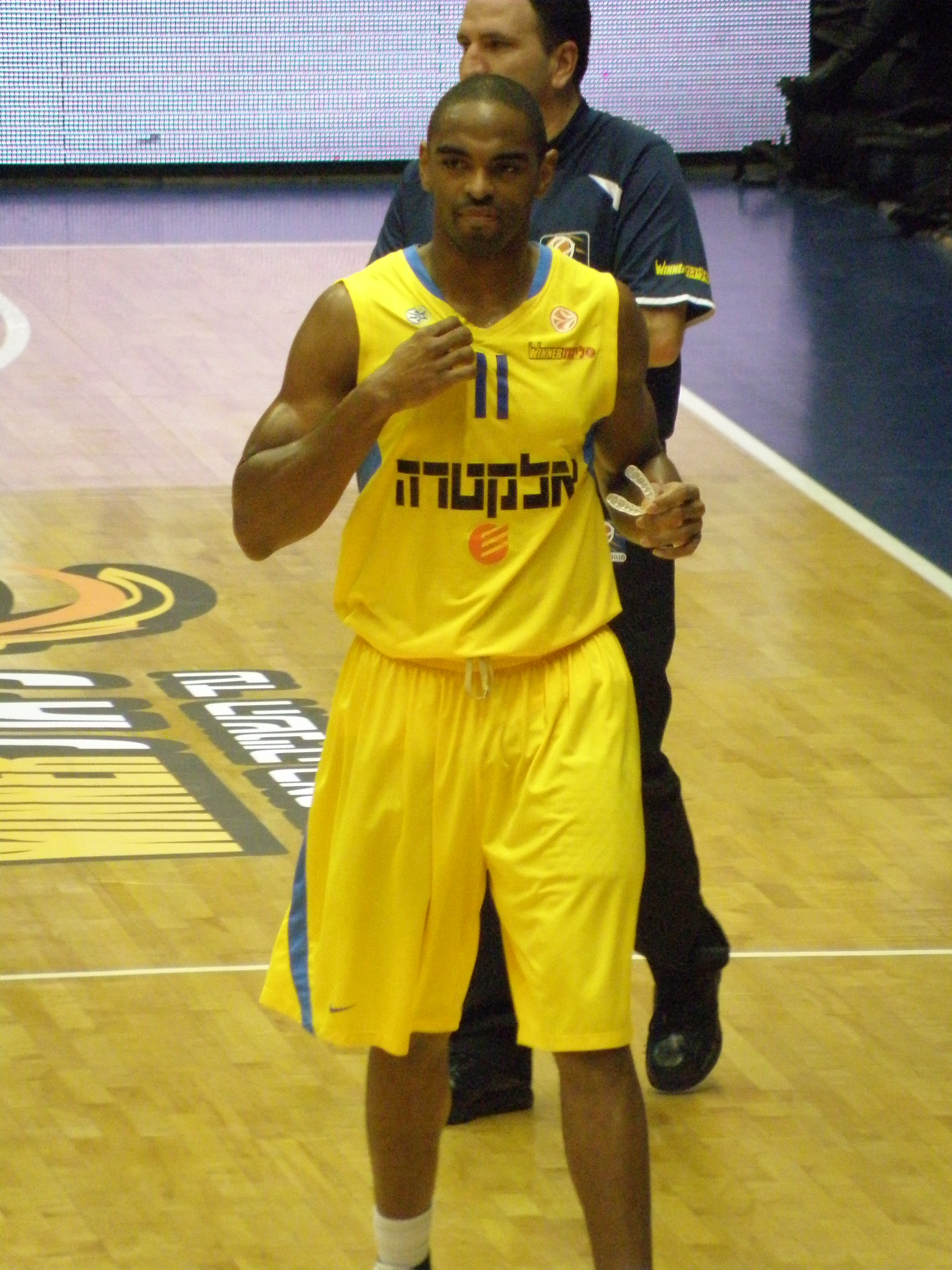
Alan Anderson

- Sacar Anim '15, basketball player in the Israeli Basketball Premier League
- John R. Arlandson, Minnesota state legislator and lawyer
- Jamison Battle '19, basketball player
- James R. Casserly, Minnesota state legislator and lawyer
- Patrick M. Daugherty, '46, Minnesota state legislator
- Thomas Dubay '39, Catholic priest, author, and retreat director
- Bishop Emeritus John Kinney '55, Bishop of the St. Cloud diocese from 1998 to 2013.
- Bob Wetoska '55, Notre Dame '59, retired NFL player
- Albert Hofstede '58, former mayor of Minneapolis
- Roy Gagnon, retired NFL player
- Bishop John Levoir '64, Bishop of the New Ulm diocese from 2008 to present
- Steve McClellan, Minneapolis concert promoter
- Nora McInerny, '01, author
- Jack Meyers, general manager of First Avenue
- Dennis Newinski '63, Minnesota state representative and machinist
- Larry Pogemiller '69, retired Minnesota Senate Majority Leader
- Jim Rice – Minnesota state legislator
- Mark Dienhart '71, executive director of the Richard M. Schulze Family Foundation and former Director of Men's Athletics at the University of Minnesota
- Don Zierden '76, longtime coach in the NBA, WNBA and CBA
- Bishop Kevin Kenney '78
- Derreck Robinson '00, retired NFL player
- Alan Anderson '01, former NBA basketball player
- Geno Crandall '14, basketball player with Hapoel Be'er Sheva in the Israeli Basketball Premier League
- Reid Travis '14, University of Kentucky and Stanford University basketball player
- Tyrell Terry '19, former Stanford University basketball player and former NBA basketball player for the Memphis Grizzlies
- Thomas E. Ticen, Minnesota state legislator and lawyer
- Jalen Travis, former Princeton and Iowa State football player and Indianapolis Colts offensive tackle

== Notable faculty ==
- Walt Dziedzic, politician, police officer, and baseball player

== Gallery ==
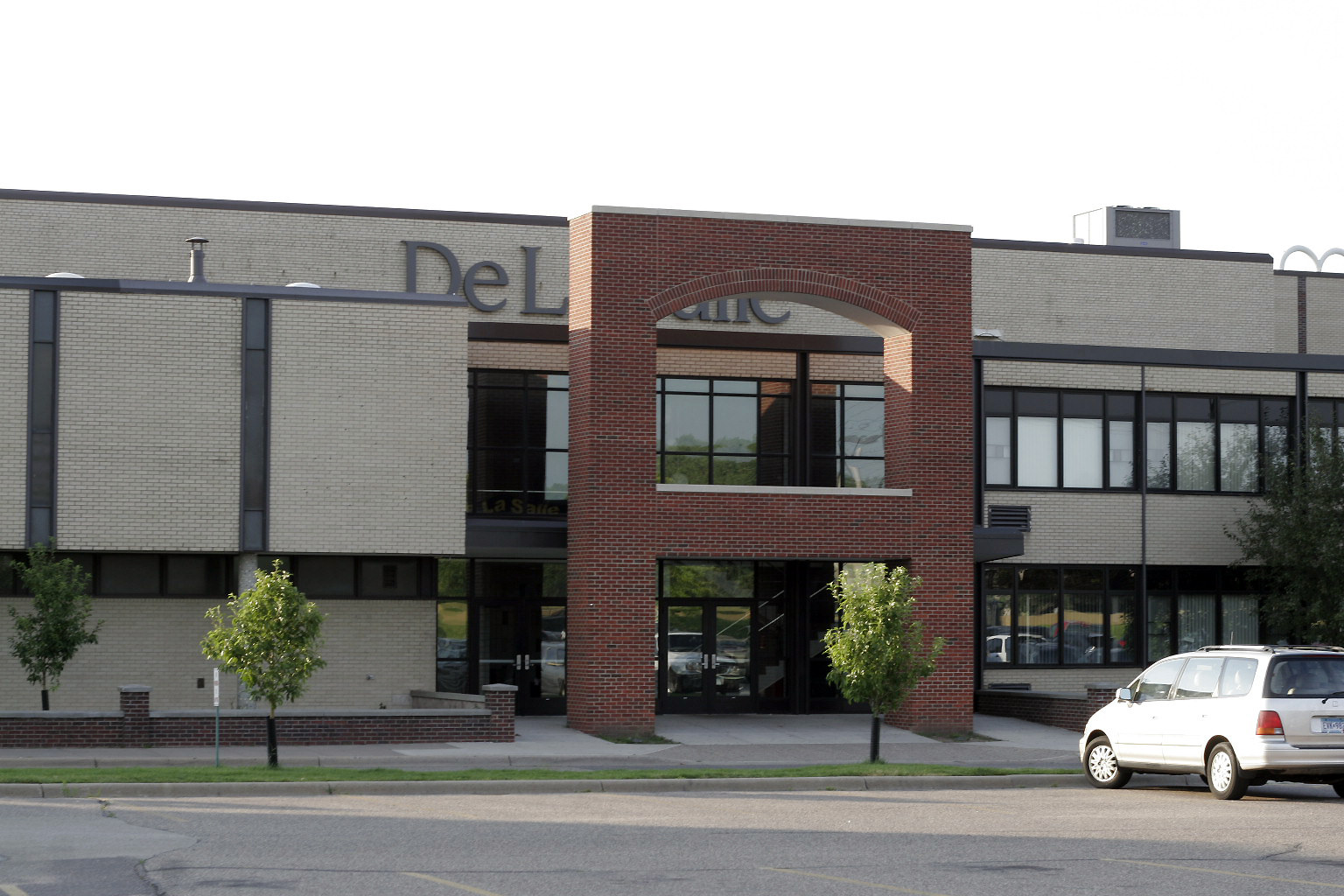
Entrance to the 'A' building and former main entrance to the school

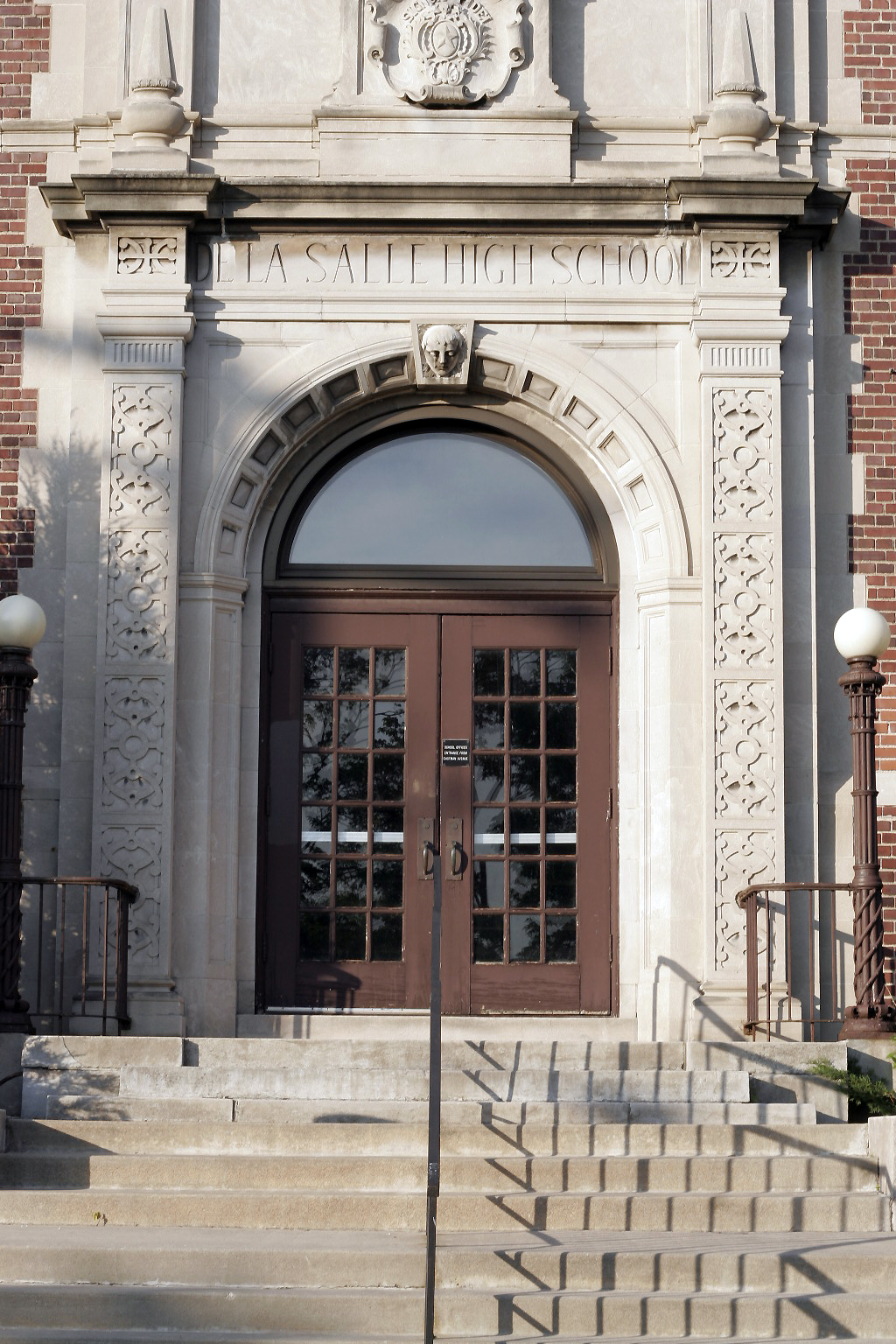
Entrance to the 'B' Building

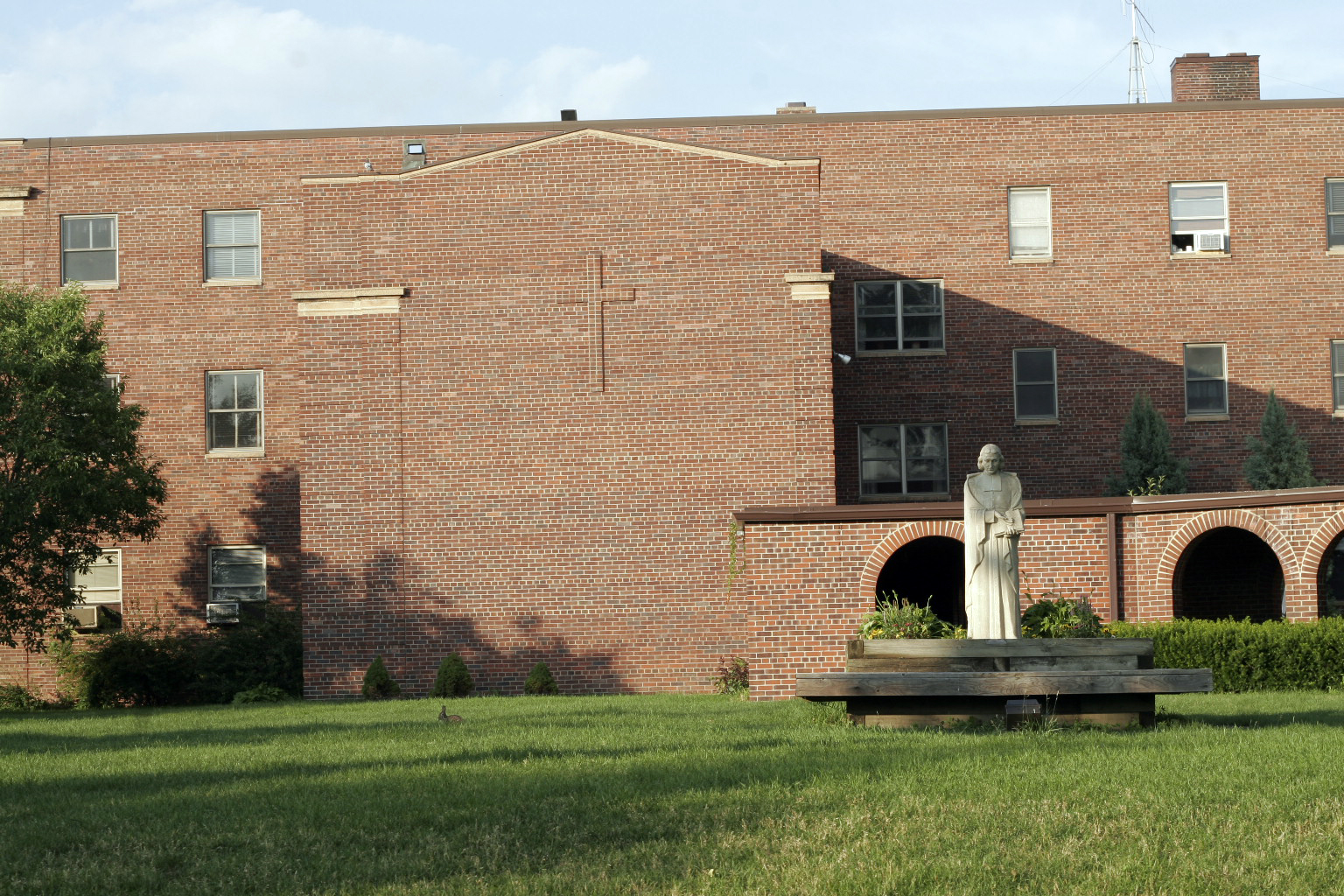
Founders Park and site of former 'C' Building
