= Patrick M. Daugherty =

American politician

Patrick M. Daugherty (November 6, 1928 – May 20, 1997) was an American politician.

Daugherty was born in Minneapolis, Minnesota and graduated from DeLaSalle High School, Minneapolis, in 1946. He went to Dunwoody College of Technology in 1953. Daugherty served in the United States Marine Corps. He lived in Minneapolis with his wife and family and was a licensed master steamfitter. Daugherty served in the Minnesota House of Representatives in 1971 and 1972 and on the Minneapolis City Council from 1977 to 1983. He was a Democrat. Daugherty died in Minneapolis from a heart attack.
