= Roy Gagnon =

American football player (1913–2000)

- Gagnon c. 1932

No. 24
- Position: Guard

Personal information
- Born: January 6, 1913; Minneapolis, Minnesota, U.S.
- Died: June 29, 2000 (aged 87); Anoka, Minnesota, U.S.
- Listed height: 5 ft 11 in (1.80 m)
- Listed weight: 205 lb (93 kg)

Career information
- High school: DeLaSalle (Minneapolis)
- College: Oregon (1931–1934)

Career history
- Detroit Lions (1935)

Awards and highlights
- NFL champion (1935)
- Stats at Pro Football Reference

Roy Joseph Maurice Gagnon (GUY-on; January 6, 1913 – June 29, 2000) was an American professional football guard who played one season with the Detroit Lions of the National Football League (NFL). He played college football at the University of Oregon.

== Early life and college ==
Roy Joseph Maurice Gagnon was born on January 6, 1913, in Minneapolis, Minnesota. He attended DeLaSalle High School in Minneapolis. He played three years as a guard on the football team. Gagnon also played baseball in high school.

Gagnon was a member of the Oregon Ducks of the University of Oregon from 1931 to 1934. He was a guard on the freshman team in 1931 and a three-year letterman from 1932 to 1934. He majored in economics at Oregon.

== Professional career ==
Gagnon signed with the Detroit Lions in 1935 and played in four games for the team as a guard during the 1935 season. He wore number 24 while with the Lions.

== Personal life ==
Gagnon died on June 29, 2000, in Anoka, Minnesota.
