= Lloyd Parsons =

American football player (1918–1986)

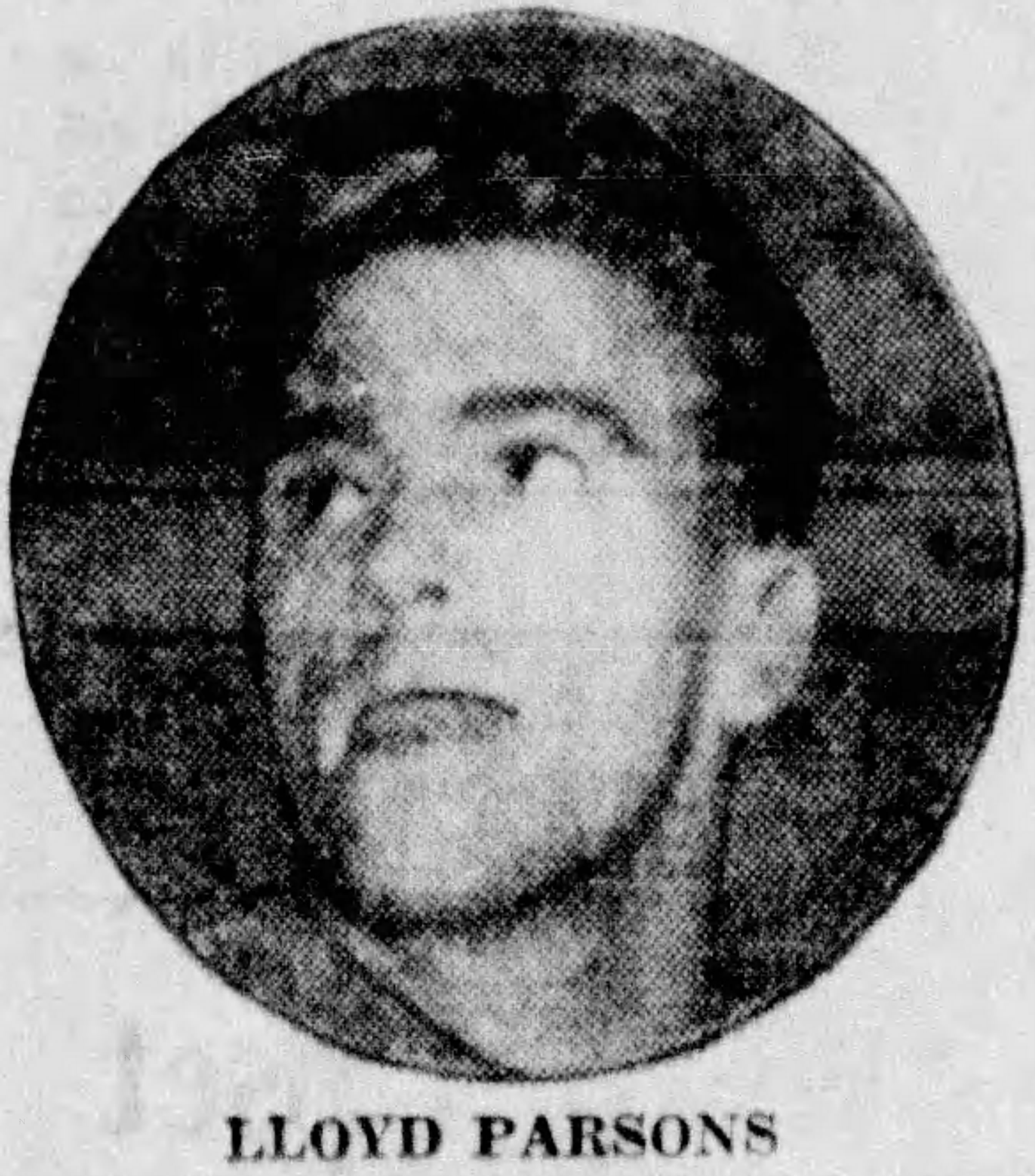
- Lloyd Parsons, 1941

Profile
- Position: Halfback

Personal information
- Born: June 10, 1918; Minneapolis
- Died: November 24, 1986 (aged 68); Hennepin County, Minnesota
- Listed height: 5 ft 11 in (1.80 m)
- Listed weight: 200 lb (91 kg)

Career information
- High school: Roosevelt (MN)
- College: Minnesota, Gustavus Adolphus

Career history
- Detroit Lions (1941)

Career statistics
- Games: 7
- Stats at Pro Football Reference

Lloyd Marion Parsons (June 10, 1918 – November 24, 1986) was an American football player.

Parsons was born in Minneapolis in 1918 and attended Roosevelt High School in that city. He played college football as a fullback for Minnesota and then for Gustavus Adolphus in 1940.

Parsons' performance at Gustavus Adolphus attracted the attention of the Detroit Lions. He signed with the Lions in May 1941. He appeared in seven games for the Lions during the 1941 season.

Parsons was inducted into the Army following the start of World War II. In 1942, he played for an All-Army team that played an exhibition game against the Lions in September 1942.

Parsons and his wife, Muriel, had two daughters (Chris and Leslie). He died in 1986 in Minnesota.
