= Don Riley =

American sportswriter

- Born: November 10, 1923; New Richmond, Wisconsin, U.S.
- Died: December 31, 2015 (aged 92); Minneapolis, Minnesota, U.S.
- Occupation: Sportswriter
- Spouse: Dorothy Riley (died 2012)
- Children: 1

Donald Riley (November 10, 1923 – December 31, 2015) was an American sportswriter at the St. Paul Pioneer Press newspaper covering Minnesota sports, from 1943 to 1988 through his "Eye Opener" column.

Born in New Richmond, Wisconsin, Riley grew up in Minneapolis and attended Roosevelt High School. He joined the Pioneer Press after high school. During his time there, he gained a reputation of agitating Green Bay Packers fans.

Riley was married to his wife Dorothy until her death in 2012. He died on New Year's Eve 2015 and was survived by his daughter Shannon and two grandchildren. He had trouble with alcohol but was sober from 1979 onwards, writing a book called Gallivan's Gang about his alcohol-fueled nights.
