= Joe Kraker =

American football player (1896–1958)

- Kraker at his wedding

No. 3
- Position: Guard

Personal information
- Born: June 14, 1896; Virginia, Minnesota, U.S.
- Died: May 14, 1958 (aged 61); St. Louis County, Minnesota, U.S.
- Listed height: 6 ft 1 in (1.85 m)
- Listed weight: 170 lb (77 kg)

Career information
- High school: Roosevelt (MN)
- College: Saskatchewan

Career history
- Saskatoon Quakers (1922); Hibbing (1923); Rock Island Independents (1924–1925)

Career statistics
- Games played: 5
- Games started: 4
- Stats at Pro Football Reference

Joseph Joannas Kraker (June 14, 1896 – May 14, 1958) was an American gridiron football player. A guard, Kraker attended high school in his native Minnesota but played college football at Saskatchewan. After graduating, he played for several Canadian football teams, including the Saskatoon Quakers in 1922. He returned to Minnesota in 1923, playing for a team in Hibbing. The following year, Kraker was signed by the Rock Island Independents of the National Football League (NFL), and appeared in five games. He was said to be the only lineman in history to play without shoulder pads.

== Early life and education ==
Kraker was born on June 14, 1896, in Virginia, Minnesota. He attended Roosevelt High School in Minneapolis and played college football for Saskatchewan.

== Professional career ==
In 1922, Kraker played Canadian football for the Saskatoon Quakers. He had previously played for several other Canadian teams. The Leader-Post reported that Kraker, along with the three Rooney brothers and Bob Walsh, were "the backbone of the team" and that they "are all stars at their particular style of play." After a loss to the Regina Roughriders in the championship game, the Saskatoon Daily Star wrote that "One of the best treats of the day was watching Joe Kraker step into [Brian] Timmis, the Regina terrier. The hard-working middlewinger astounded the opposing outfit and after the game they stated that Kraker was one of the finest linemen they had ever seen in action."

A 1923 article from the Saskatoon Daily Star said

without a doubt Kraker is the toughest linesman that ever lined up with a local senior grid squad. His work, especially in the provincial championship game against Regina last fall was nothing short of sensational. Brian Timmis, demon line plunger for the Capital City club, and now a star with the Ottawa gridders, stated that Kraker was the hardest linesman he ever bumped up against.

In 1923, Kraker moved to the United States and played tackle for the Hibbing team of Hibbing, Minnesota. Mid-season, Kraker sent a letter to Hub Bishop that said the following: "Playing American [football] provides one with plenty of excitement but I want Saskatoon fans to know that Im [sic] keen on the Canadian style of football and wish I were up north battling in the line with the [Saskatoon] Quakers."

Near the start of the 1924 season, Kraker signed with the Rock Island Independents of the National Football League (NFL). He made his debut in the second game of the season, a 9–0 win against the Racine Legion. In the game Kraker started at right guard, blocking for the Pro Football Hall of Famer Jim Thorpe. He returned as starter for their next game, a 26–0 win over the Hammond Pros where Kraker played through the entire game. In the Independents' week four win over the Dayton Triangles, he appeared as a substitute for Walt Buland.

Kraker started at right guard in their week five loss to the Kansas City Blues, the first loss of the season for the Independents. He missed week six, a tie to the Chicago Bears. He was released mid-November after a broken bone in his hand left him unable to play. The Rock Island Argus reported that he "was a strong man on the barrier and played an important part in the Islanders' opening games."

In September 1925, Kraker was re-signed by the Independents. He did not appear in any regular season games for the 1925 Independents.

Kraker appears to have later played professional football with several other teams, with the Star-Phoenix writing in 1930: "The Rooney boys and Kraker have been playing professional football in the United States. They are rated among the best in the game."

A 1942 article in the Saskatoon StarPhoenix reported that Kraker is "said to be the only lineman in history to play without shoulder pads."

== Later life and death ==
Kraker died on May 14, 1958, in St. Louis County, Minnesota. He was 61.
