= Thomas E. Ticen =

American politician (1927–2006)

Thomas Earl Ticen Sr. (December 9, 1927 – March 11, 2006) was an American lawyer and politician.

Ticen was born in Rockford, Illinois and graduated from DeLaSalle High School in Minneapolis, Minnesota. He graduated from College of Saint Benedict and Saint John's University in 1948 and his law degree from University of Minnesota Law School in 1951. Ticen was admitted to the Minnesota bar and practiced law in Bloomington, Minnesota. He served in the United States Army from 1952 to 1954, with the judge advocate office, and was commissioned a second lieutenant. Ticen served in the Minnesota House of Representatives from 1967 to 1972 and then served on the Hennepin County Commission from 1972 to 1978. He was a Democrat. He died from lung cancer in Minnetonka, Minnesota.
