= Any Austin =

American YouTuber and video essayist

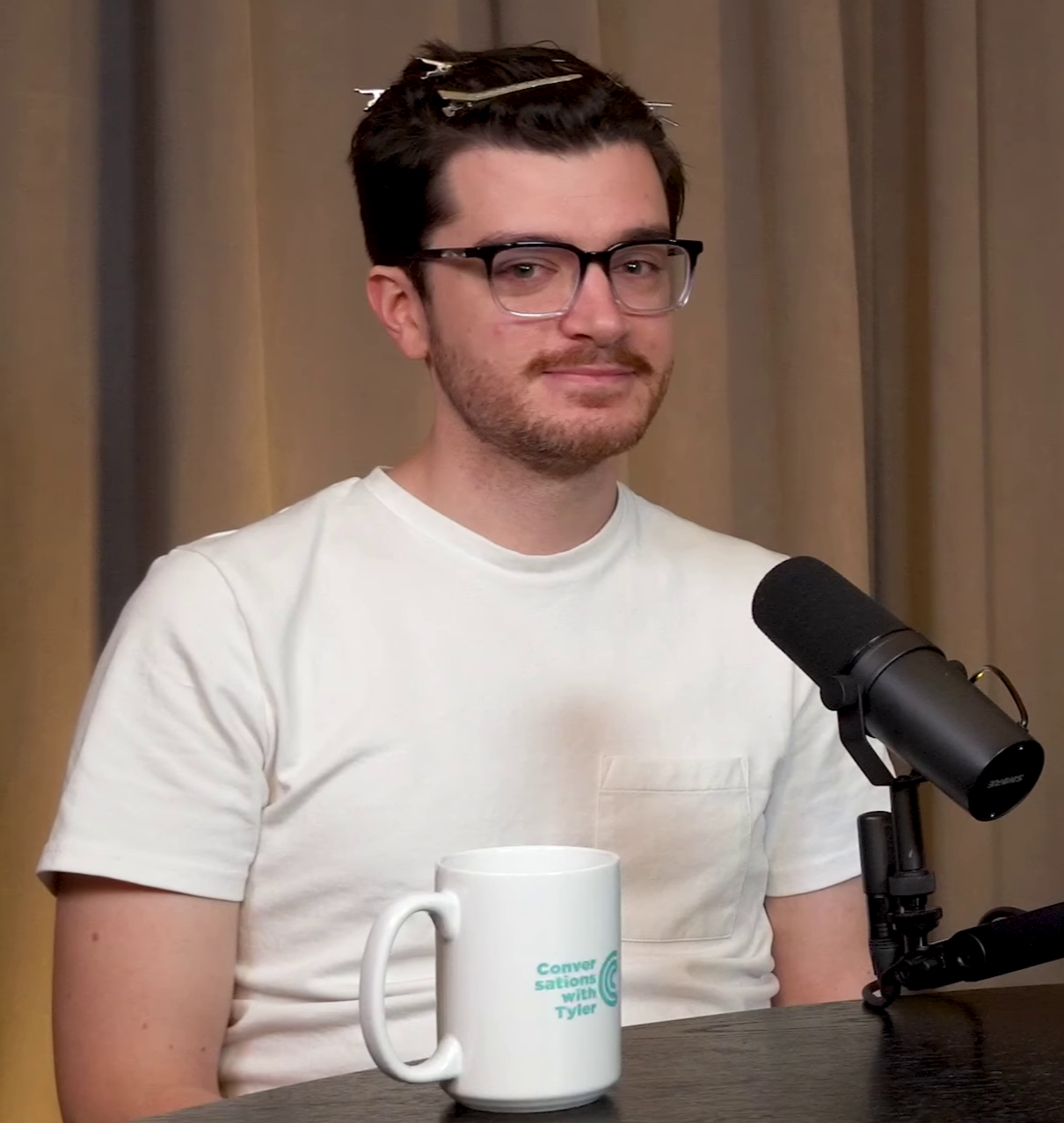
- Austin in 2025
- Born: March 10, 1992 (age 34)
- Occupations: YouTuber; musician

YouTube information
- Channel: any_austin
- Years active: 2013–present
- Genre: Video essay
- Subscribers: 1.59 million
- Views: 181.911 million
- Any Austin's voice Austin discussing the goals of his videos. Recorded 2025.
- Last updated: October 2, 2026

Any Austin (born March 10, 1992) is an American YouTuber known for creating video essays about video games. He focuses on obscure, specific, or technical aspects of games and their setting, including The Elder Scrolls, Grand Theft Auto, and The Legend of Zelda. Topics covered in these videos include the hydrology, infrastructure, or economies of the games' worlds, surveying them like real-world places, usually to highlight the attention to detail (or lack thereof) of a game's developers.

== Content ==
Austin has created videos discussing the hydrology of several video games, such as The Elder Scrolls III: Morrowind, The Legend of Zelda: Tears of the Kingdom, and The Elder Scrolls V: Skyrim.

Austin's study of video games led him to analyze the power grids in Grand Theft Auto IV and Grand Theft Auto V, and the number of nuclear bombs detonated in the map of Fallout 3. He has also made videos attempting to live an average life in games like Cyberpunk 2077.

Austin has a series on his channel in which he searches for 'odd and unremarkable places' in video games. These showcase a series of places that a player would not normally explore in any great detail.

He also creates music under the name the Excellent Man from Minneapolis.

== Reception ==
Hyperallergic's Dan Schindel included Austin's video essay on the power grid in Los Santos in a list of video essays during the holiday season. Several writers for PC Gamer recommended Austin's videos, including Joshua Wolens, who said that Austin put "a thousand times more work and analysis" into analyzing Morrowind than the game designers would have expected.

== Personal life ==
Any Austin was born on March 10, 1992. Originally from Minneapolis, Minnesota, he currently lives in New Orleans, Louisiana.
