= Ron Latz =

American politician

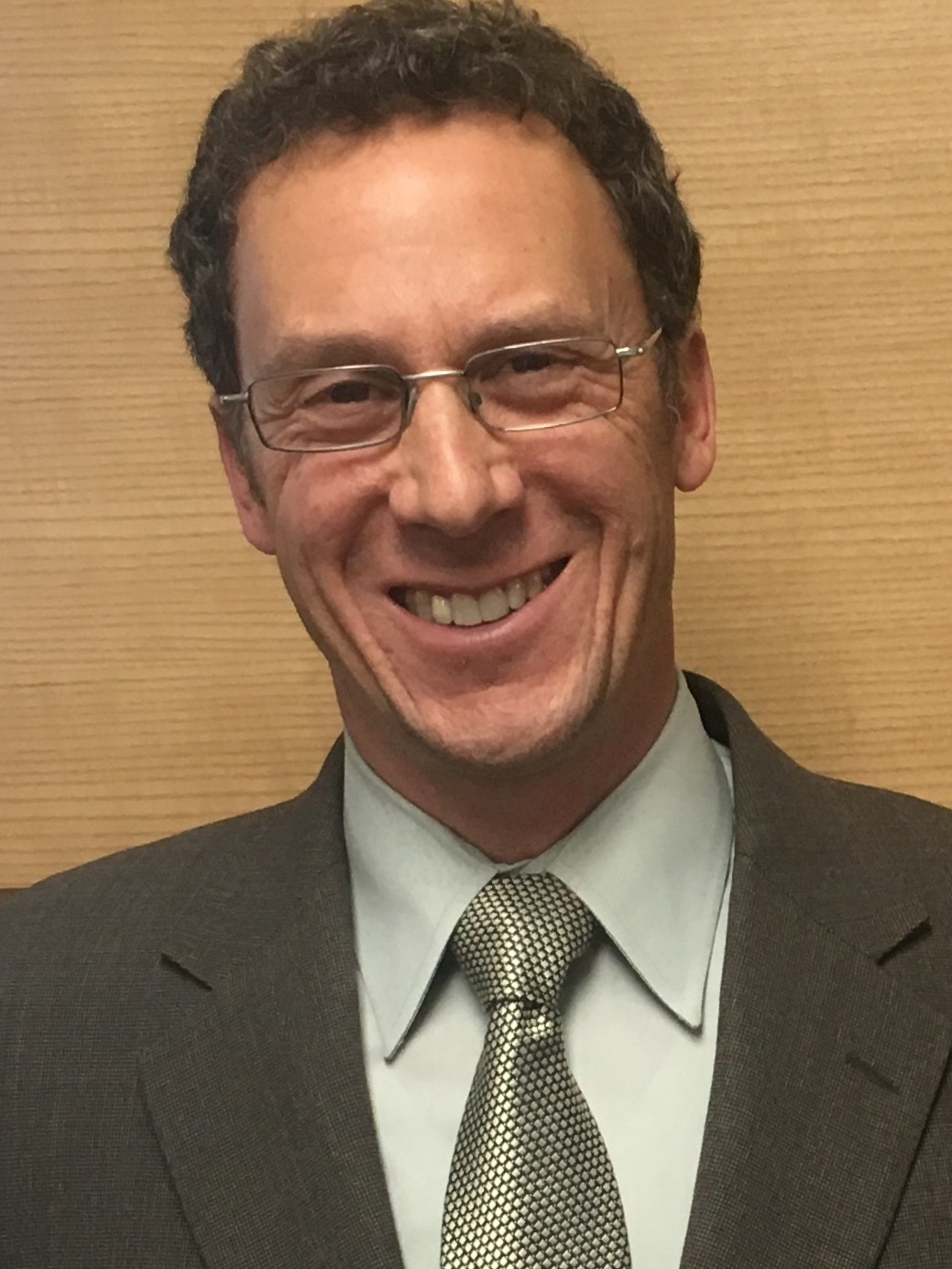

Member of the Minnesota Senate
- Incumbent
- Assumed office January 8, 2013
- Constituency: 46th district
- In office January 3, 2007 – January 8, 2013
- Preceded by: Steve Kelley
- Succeeded by: Terri Bonoff
- Constituency: 44th district

Member of the Minnesota House of Representatives from the 44B district
- In office January 7, 2003 – January 3, 2007
- Preceded by: redrawn district
- Succeeded by: Ryan Winkler

Personal details
- Born: August 9, 1963 (age 62) Minneapolis, Minnesota, U.S.
- Party: Democratic (DFL)
- Spouse: Julia Shmidov
- Children: 3
- Relatives: Bob Latz (father)
- Education: University of Wisconsin–Madison (BA); Harvard University (JD)

Ronald Steven Latz (/ˈlæts/ LATS; born August 9, 1963) is an American attorney and politician serving as a member of the Minnesota Senate. A member of the Minnesota Democratic–Farmer–Labor Party (DFL), he represents District 46, which includes parts of Hennepin County in the western Twin Cities metropolitan area.

== Early life and education ==
Latz attended Golden Valley High School in Golden Valley and Lindberg High School in Hopkins, graduating in 1981. He earned a Bachelor of Arts degree in political science from the University of Wisconsin–Madison in 1985 and a Juris Doctor from Harvard Law School in 1988.

== Political career ==
Latz was a Minnesota assistant attorney general for the Public Safety and Human Services Division under Attorney General Hubert Humphrey III from 1989 to 1995, then became a partner in the St. Louis Park law firm of Latz and Latz.

Latz has been active on various government and community councils and boards. He was a member of the St. Louis Park City Council from 1994 to 2003, also serving as mayor pro tem from 1999 to 2003. He is a former member of the Minnesota Attorney General's task forces on Health Care and Privacy. He is also a former state advocacy chair of the American Cancer Society, a former member of the Anti-Defamation League's Civil Rights and Education committees, and a former member of the Metropolitan Interfaith Council on Affordable Housing.

=== Minnesota legislature ===
Latz was first elected to the House in 2002, and reelected in 2004. He was elected to the Senate in 2006, and reelected in 2010, 2012, 2016, 2020, and 2022.

Before being elected to the Senate, Latz was a member of the Minnesota House of Representatives, representing District 44B (before the 2002 legislative redistricting, the area was District 44A). He was first elected to the House in 2002, and reelected in 2004. In the House, he served on the Capital Investment, Civil Law, Education Policy and Reform, and Higher Education Finance committees. His father, Robert Latz, also served in the House, representing the old districts 35 and 39 from 1959 to 1967.

He served as a majority whip from 2007 to 2011.

Latz served on the following committees for the 2025–26 legislative biennium:

- Chair of the Judiciary and Public Safety Committee
- Commerce and Consumer Protection

=== Political positions ===
His special legislative concerns are criminal and civil justice, public safety, consumer protection, and education.

Latz supports gun control and a bill banning assault weapons.

==== Housing ====
Latz has supported legislation related to affordable housing, tenant protections, homelessness prevention, and manufactured home parks. He supported $100 million in housing infrastructure bonds to finance affordable housing units statewide and $14.275 million for Greater Minnesota workforce housing. He authored a bill increasing funding for the Bring It Home rental assistance program, and supported $13 million for supportive housing serving seniors, veterans, people with disabilities, and survivors of domestic violence. He also supported $40 million for Family Homelessness Prevention programs and advanced a housing project in Hopkins creating hundreds of affordable and senior housing units.

As chair of the Senate Judiciary Committee, Latz gave hearings to SF 3565, which requires prospective tenants to be allowed to inspect their rental unit before signing a lease, and SF 4104, which expanded landlords' obligations to provide heat during Minnesota winters; both bills were enacted into law. He was a strong supporter of emergency rental assistance legislation.

Latz also supported the Manufactured Home Park Residents' Bill of Rights (SF 2691), which gives residents the first opportunity to purchase their park when it is sold, strengthens protections against excessive rent increases, and increases accountability for park owners. During the bill's hearing in the Judiciary Committee, he helped defeat an amendment that would have removed the bill's 3% annual cap on rent increases.

==== Palestine ====
On November 29, 2023, during a press conference to condemn a movement that seeks to boycott or divest from Israel ahead of a meeting of the State Board of Investment, Latz said, "Palestinian children are taught at UNRWA schools that Jews should be killed. They attend summer camps that teach young kids how to be terrorists. They play 'kill the Jew' on the streets of Gaza. Children's television shows glorify the killings of Jews, and UNRWA-run elementary school playground toys are plastic AK-47s. Palestinian youth dream of the opportunity to achieve glory and even martyrdom by killing as many Jews as possible."

After he was called out for his statements, he said they were taken out of context and referred to earlier comments about Gaza youth, education, and schools that allegedly train terrorists, citing various videos and news sources he had seen. He invited his colleagues "to sit down and talk about the Middle East and the respective roles of Hamas and Israel in the ongoing conflict and the terrible loss of innocent lives".

== Personal life ==
His father, Bob Latz, served in the House from 1959 to 1967 and was the DFL-endorsed candidate for Attorney General in 1966. His grandfather, Rubin Latz, was president of the Minneapolis Council of Business Agents in the 1930s and 1940s, coming out of the Laundry and Dry Cleaners Union. He is Jewish.
