= Marvin Harold Anderson =

American businessman and politician

Marvin Harold Anderson (March 3, 1918 – February 13, 1998) was an American businessman and politician.

Anderson was born in Minneapolis, Minnesota and graduated from Roosevelt High School in Minneapolis. Anderson served in the United States Army during World War II. He lived in Minneapolis with his wife and family and was a building contractor. Anderson served in the Minnesota Senate from 1947 to 1958. He then lived in Bloomington, Minnesota. Anderson died in Bradenton, Florida.
