= Carl L. Lyse =

American politician

Carl L. Lyse (November 8, 1899 – November 22, 1986) was an American businessman and politician.

Lyse was born in Elk Mound, Dunn County, Wisconsin and went to the public schools and to business school. Lyse lived in Minneapolis, Minnesota with his wife and family and worked for the insurance and real estate businesses. Lyse served in the Minnesota House of Representatives from 1943 to 1948.
