= Herman J. Kording =

American politician (1903–1990)

Herman John Kording (August 30, 1903 – August 25, 1990) was an American farmer, millwright and politician.

Kording was born in Hayfield, Dodge County, Minnesota and graduated from the Hayfield High School. He went to law school. Kording lived in Minneapolis, Minnesota with his wife and family and a farmer and millwright. Kording served in the Minnesota House of Representatives from 1955 to 1958 and in the Minnesota Senate from 1959 to 1962. He was a Democrat. Kording died from heart problems in a hospital in Tucson, Arizona. The burial was in Grandview Cemetery in Austin, Minnesota.
