= George E. Murk =

American firefighter, businessman, and politician

George Elmer Murk (April 16, 1894 – March 24, 1971) was an American firefighter, businessman, and politician.

Murk was born in Minneapolis, Minnesota. He went to the Minneapolis public schools and the Minneapolis Business College. He lived in Minneapolis with his wife and family. Murk was a firefighter with the Minneapolis Fire Department from 1917 to 1939. Murk was also involved with the Minneapolis Musicians Association from 1934 to 1961. Murk served in the Minnesota House of Representatives from 1945 to 1954 and from 1957 to 1962. He died in Minneapolis, Minnesota.
