= Dennis Newinski =

American politician

Dennis Roman "Denny" Newinski (August 21, 1944 – February 10, 2009) was an American politician and machinist.

Newinski was born in Minneapolis, Minnesota. He graduated from DeSasalle High School, Minneapolis, in 1963. Newinski went to Dunwoody College of Technology. He lived in Maplewood, Minnesota with his wife and family and was a machinist working for Northern States Power Company until he retired in 2000. Newinski was a member of the Democratic Party until 1988, when he then joined the Republican Party. Newinski served in the Minnesota House of Representatives in 1991 and 1992. He also ran for the Republican nomination for the United States House of Representatives in 1994, in 1996, and in 1998 and lost the election every time to Bruce Vento. He ran for the Minnesota Senate in 2000, but lost the general election to Chuck Wiger. He died from cancer at his home, in Maplewood, Minnesota, after being exposed to asbestos.

Minnesota House of Representatives
Preceded by Dick Kostohryz	Member of the Minnesota House of Representatives from the 54B district 1991–1993	Succeeded by Mindy Greiling
