= Chris Middlebrook =

American lawyer, author and bandy player/coach/leader

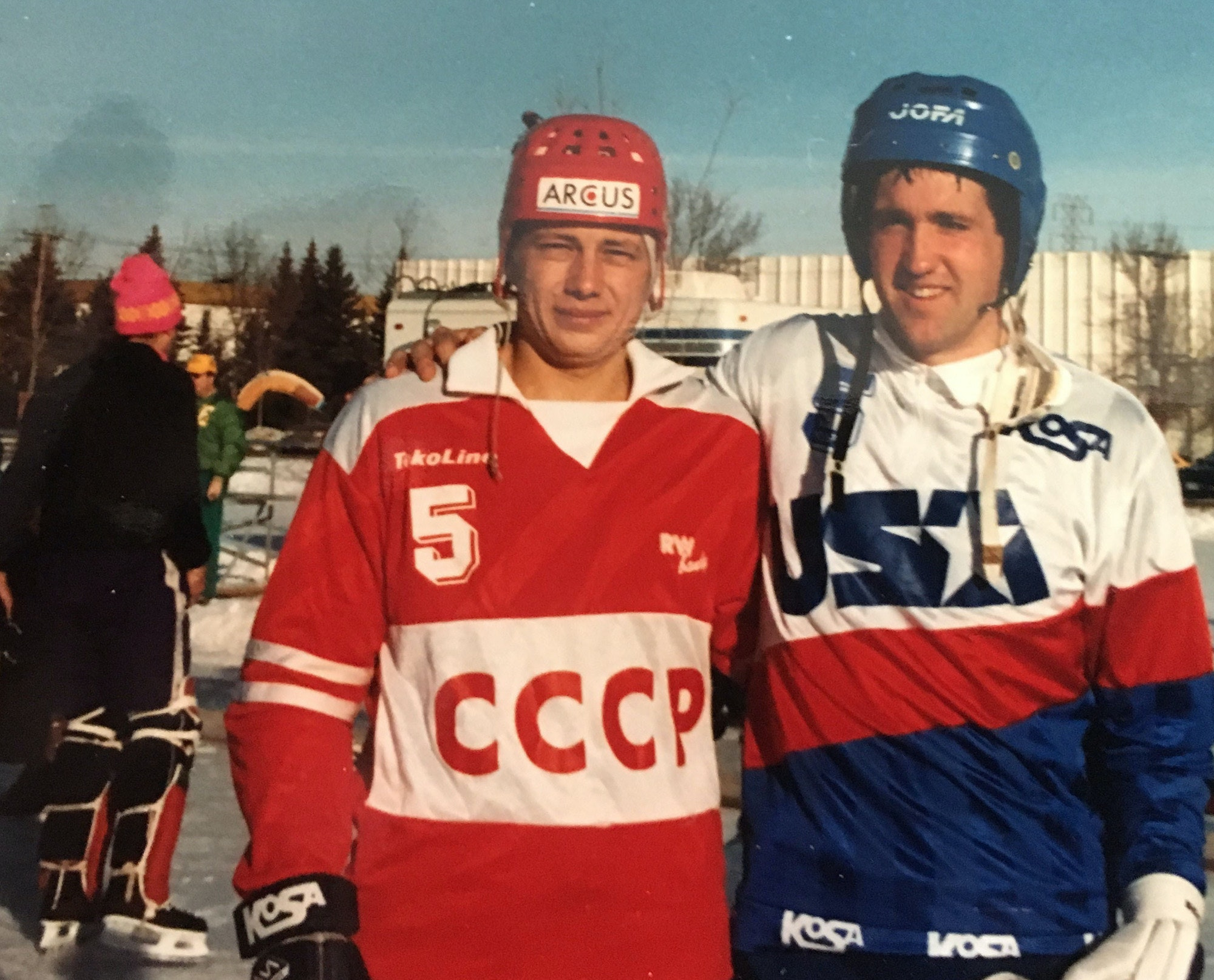

Christopher John Middlebrook (born August 7, 1957) is an American lawyer, author and Bandy player/coach/leader. He is the current President of the American Bandy Association.

== Early life ==
Middlebrook was born in Minneapolis, Minnesota, to John Middlebrook, a physician, and Phyllis Middlebrook. He has four siblings, sisters Joan and Apophia and brothers William and Geoff.

Middlebrook attended Washburn High School, where he was a multi sport athlete. After graduation in 1975, he attended Gustavus Adolphus College, class of 1979, where he majored in Russian, with a triple minor in Business, History and Political Science, and played on the varsity hockey team. Middlebrook then earned his JD from the University of Minnesota in 1983, where he also ran the Appellate Advocacy Program his senior year after finishing first among 180 students in the 1982 competition.

== Bandy career ==
Middlebrook was introduced to the sport of Bandy in December 1980. He played on the first US champion, The Bandolier, in 1980-81, and skated for the first US National Team to compete overseas, October 1981. Middlebrook played Libero (Sweeper) for his entire bandy career.

Middlebrook was inducted into inaugural USA Bandy Hall of Fame in 2014

=== Player and coach ===
- 14 US Championships as a player
- 4 US Championships as a Coach
- 13 North American Cup Championships as a player
- 2 North American Cup Championships as a Coach
- 5 time USA Rink Bandy Champion
- 2 time North American Cup Rink Bandy Champion
- 173 international matches for US teams 1981-2002
- 15 years US National Team Captain 1982-1997
- First North American skater to player bandy for a Swedish Team-Skovde BK 1983-84
- First true professional bandy player in the world-Harnosands AIK 1985-86
- Player/Coach of US National Team 1987-89
- Head Coach of US National Team 1999-2005 and 2008-2011
- Bandolier BC Coach 2014–present
- Dynamo Washburn Coach(US first Division and 3 time champion) 2006-2011
- Saints Coach(US first Division and 3 time champion) 2013-2019
- Asst Coach US Women's national Team 2017–present
- Asst Coach Eagles(US Women, first division and 1 time champion) 2017–present
- Coach US U15 boys team 2005-2007-competed in Sweden and Russia
- Asst Coach U15 USA Boys Team-2019 World Championships
- Assistant Coach US Women's national Team 2017- 2021
- Head Coach US Women's National Team 2021 to present

=== Sports administrator ===
- ABA Board Member since 1982
- ABA President 1992-1996 and 2004–Present
- Member of International Bandy Federation Olympic Committee
- Co Founder of North American Bandy Cup
- Founder of North American Rink Bandy Cup
- Co Founder of American International Summer Bandy Camp
- ABA President 1992-1996 and 2004-2022

== Author ==
Middlebrook authored the book "The Bandy Chronicles-My Pursuit of a Forgotten Sport", a collection of 118 short stories encompassing his life in bandy. The Bandy Chronicles was first published in December 2019. The book is available in the US, the Nordic countries, Russia and other bandy countries. Many of the stories have been translated into Russian and Italian, where they have been featured on the literary website foglieviaggi.cloud

While working for The Rollerblade Company from 1984 to 1985, Middlebrook edited and ghost wrote the book "Rollerblades, Dryland Training For Ice Hockey" in 1985. 25,000 copies were printed and distributed to ice hockey coaches in the US and Canada. Middlebrook has also authored articles on Bandy and Ice Hockey.

In February 2023 Middlebrook's second book, "The Girl Who Played Hockey - A Story of Loss, Triumph and an Indomitable Heart" was published.

Middlebrook has also authored numerous article on Bandy and Ice Hockey" including:

   * "A 100 Year Grudge? - Why Bandy is not in the Winter Olympics"
   * "Is Bandy Too Expensive for the Winter Olympics? - Let's Ask Luge, Skeleton and Bobsled"
   * "It's True - Charles Darwin Actually Played Bandy"
   * "Gustavus Men's Hockey 1976-77 - The Forgotten Team"

== Lawyer ==
Middlebrook did not start actively practicing law until March 1988 when he began work with the Weinard/Webb Law Firm. Within two years he was named a Partner. In 1995 he opened his own law firm, Middlebrook Law, where he represented plaintiff's in Workers Compensation and Personal Injury Claims.

In 1999 Middlebrook was first named a Minnesota Super Lawyer and to the Best Lawyers in Minnesota and was annually given these awards until his retirement in 2017. In addition Middlebrook was named to "Who's Who Among North American Lawyers", and "Top Litigators in North America". Middlebrook represented over 5200 clients in his career, many of whom were immigrants. He taught CLE seminars on Elimination of Bias.

== Personal life ==
Middlebrook is married to Cathryn Young Middlebrook since 1984. They were classmates at the University of Minnesota Law School . Cathryn is the Chief Appellate Public Defender of the State of Minnesota.

The couple have two children, Ian, born 1991 and Delaney born 1993. Middlebrook coached both Ian and Delaney in the 9 years he was a head coach in the Washburn Youth Hockey Association and also coached both in bandy. Ian was a 5 time US bandy champion and played in 2 World Championships for the US. Delaney played four years as a professional hockey player in Sweden, with Djurgården .
