= Maria Cristina Tavera =

Latina artist, curator, & activist (born 1965)

- Born: 1965 (age 60–61); Minnesota
- Education: University of Minnesota
- Movement: Contemporary Latinx artistry

Maria Cristina Tavera ("Tina") (born 1965) is a contemporary Latino artist, curator, and cultural organizer who lives and works in Minneapolis, Minnesota. Influenced by her dual citizenship, as well as her transnational movement between her residing Minnesota and Mexico families, she combines historical and contemporary texts and images from recognizable Latin American myths, legends, and present news. Tavera uses her prints, paintings, installations, and Dia de los Muertos ofrendas, or altars, to explore the way that national and cultural icons symbolize complex identities and can construct shared communities at home and abroad. Her artwork is both humorous and confrontational as she invites her viewers to question constructs of race, gender, ethnicity and national and cultural identities. She has exhibited her artwork and curated shows all around the world, and has artworks permanently installed in several art exhibits throughout Minnesota.

== Education and career ==
Tavera was born in 1965. In 1990, Tavera earned a B.A. in Spanish and a B.A. in Latin American Studies, from the University of Minnesota. She later achieved a master's degree from the University of Minnesota Humphrey School of Public Affairs, with an emphasis on Leadership in the Arts.

Tavera currently works at Augsburg University in Minneapolis, MN, where she serves as the Director for the TRIO-McNair Scholars program, which is a program that helps low income, first-generation and underrepresented students with admission to graduate school. Before working at Augsburg, Tavera founded the Mira Gallery at the Instituto de Cultura y Educacion at El Colegio in South Minneapolis, where she worked for two years curating exhibitions by Latino artists. She has also previously worked as the Community Organizer for Latinos en Accion, a community outreach program that serves the Latinx community in the Twin Cities.

Tavera is the author of the book "Mexican Pulp Art" published in 2007.

== Artwork ==
Tavera is a multidisciplinary artist, who often works with screen printing because of the medium's long history of spreading ideas to the masses. Her work explores how Latinx immigrants are seen and how they want to be seen. Tavera's art focuses on Latinx iconography, symbols, physical traits, and paraphernalia to analyze Latinx ethnicity and culture. Through her art, Tavera aims to make possible conversations about difficult topics for which words don't always exist.

In 2018, her work was featured on the cover and in an artist spotlight in the academic journal, Diálogo: An Interdisciplinary Studies Journal, published by the University of Texas Press. Her art works are included in the collections of the Hagfors Center at Augsburg University; the Tweed Museum of Art in Duluth, MN; the Plains Museum in Fargo, ND; and the Weisman Art Museum in Minneapolis, MN.

=== La Conneccion/The Connection ===
In 2021, Tavera created a billboard for display in George Floyd Square as part of the Social Justice Billboard Project. Her billboard titled La Conneccion (The Connection) features an indigenous woman with braids wrapping around images of a bag of groceries, a person wearing a face mask, and a silhouette of a protesting group. The braids connect with an early telephone switchboard. Tavera's billboard is a celebration of how communities are able to move forward by working together.

== Curatorial work ==
Tavera has curated a number of exhibitions in the Twin Cities and beyond. In 2016, she curated an exhibition, entitled "Sus Voces," or "Their Voices," at the Highpoint Center for Printmaking in Minneapolis, which presented the work of nine women printmakers from Mexico. In 2015, she was instrumental in organizing local galleries and artists to be a part of the Twin Cities Takeover by feminist art and performance group, the Guerrilla Girls. She has additionally curated exhibitions at the Minnesota Museum of American Art, Macalester College, and has served as a curatorial panelist for both the Minneapolis Institute of Arts and the Walker Arts Center.

== Interviews ==
- 2016: Radio Gallery: Un-Typing Casta, KUMD 103.3 FM
- 2016: Discovering Your Creative Voice: An interview with artist Tina Tavera
- 2014: Tina Tavera, In Progress

== Exhibitions ==
Year	Exhibition Name	Gallery / Museum	Location
2022	Mestizaje: Intermix-Remix	Minnesota Museum of American Art	Saint Paul, MN
	Traitor, Survivor, Icon: The Legacy of La Malinche and the Conquest of Mexico	Denver Art Museum	Denver, CO
	La Línea	Plains Art Museum	Fargo, ND
2021	Homeward Bound (solo)	Staniar Gallery, Washington and Lee University	Lexington, VA
	ADVOCATES: Portraits of Activists	Minneapolis Public Library	Minneapolis, MN
	By Return	Prøve Gallery	Duluth, Minnesota
	La Movida/The Hustle (solo)	NE Sculpture Garden	Minneapolis, MN
2020	Promesas de Papel/Paper Promises (solo)	Oglethorpe Museum of Art	Atlanta, GA
	Prints on Ice	Highpoint Center for Printmaking	Minneapolis, MN
	Fabulista 2	NE Sculpture Gallery	Minneapolis, MN
	Talleres Sin Fronteras	Taller Arte de Nuevo Almanecer	Woodland, CA
2017	WARHOL: Minnesota Goes Pop	Rochester Center Arts	Rochester, MN
	Latino Art Migration	Concordia Art Center	Saint Paul, MN
2016	Un-Typing Casta (solo)	Tweed Museum	Duluth, MN
	Reconfiguring Casta (solo)	Christiansen Gallery, Augsburg University	Minneapolis, MN
2013	Americo: Celebrating the Spirits (solo)	Cargill Gallery, Walker Art Center	Minneapolis, MN
