= Bob Latz =

American politician (1930–2022)

Member of the Minnesota House of Representatives from the 39th district
- In office 1963–1966

Member of the Minnesota House of Representatives from the 35th district
- In office 1959–1962

Personal details
- Born: July 15, 1930 Hibbing, Minnesota, U.S.
- Died: April 19, 2022 (aged 91)
- Party: Liberal
- Spouse: Carolyn Spater
- Children: 4, including Ron Latz
- Education: University of Minnesota
- Occupation: Attorney

Robert Latz (July 15, 1930 – April 19, 2022) was an American politician in the state of Minnesota. He served in the Minnesota House of Representatives from 1959–1962 and 1963–1966. He was an attorney and served as Assistant Attorney General of Minnesota from 1955 to 1958.
