= Alfred Skrenda =

American illustrator

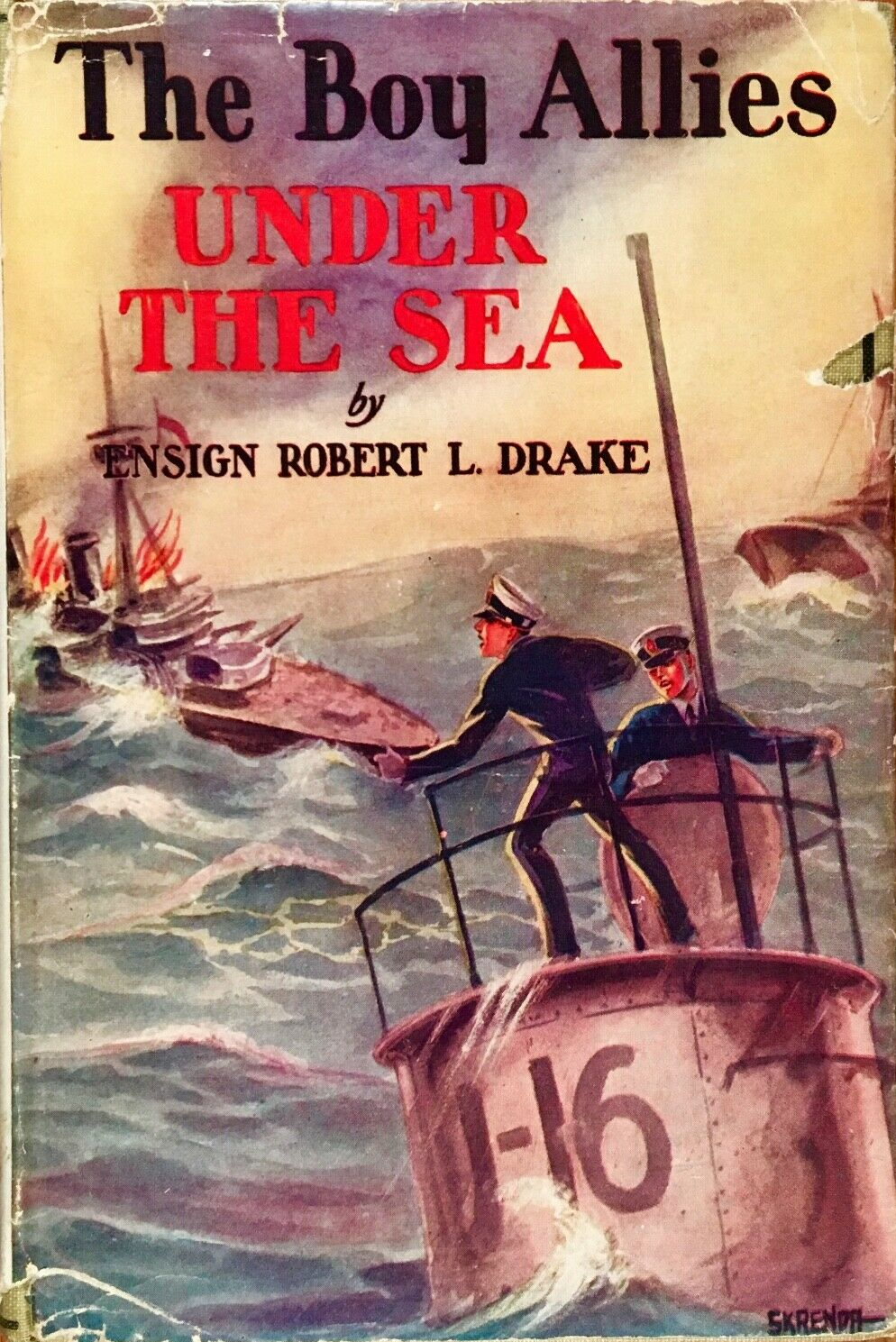
Illustration for The Boy Allies Under the Sea, published by A. L. Burt in 1916

Alfred George Skrenda (1897–1978) was an American illustrator, particularly of book dust jackets.

== Early life ==
Alfred George Skrenda was born on March 2, 1897, in Minneapolis, Minnesota in the United States, the fourth of five children of Edward Skrenda (1866–1901) and Anna Buphila Skrenda (1867–1944). His parents were from Austria-Hungary, and married there in 1887 before emigrating to the US.

== Career ==
Skrenda was designing dust jackets for Grosset & Dunlap from at least as early as 1928, particularly for popular romantic fiction such as May Christie's Love's Ecstasy (1928). In 1929, he illustrated the jacket for Rupert Hughes's She Goes to War and other stories, published to tie in with a film based on the title story, She Goes to War, released that year. In 1930, he illustrated Lefty Leighton, one of the Buddy Books for Boys series, by Percy Keese Fitzhugh.

In 1932, Skrenda was the co-author of Minute Stories from the Bible with Isabel Juergens, published by Grosset & Dunlap, which Writer's Digest called a "handy and inexpensive" addition to a feature writer's reference library. In 1934, Skrenda and Juergens co-authored the picture book Minute Wonders of the World, which he also illustrated. A review in Atlantica noted that although many "world wonder books" had been published in the 1870s and 1880s, there had been no up-to-date illustrated volumes published in the few years preceding. The Christian Science Monitor called Minute Wonders of the World "a combination geography guide-encyclopedia which every member of the family will be interested in", and noted that each of the 144 natural and man-made "wonders" highlighted in the book had a dedicated page with an illustration and a small map.

In 1939, he created a cover for Alexandre Dumas' The Man in the Iron Mask to tie in with the film version released that year. He designed several covers for Grace Livingston Hill, and the cover for an edition of Dashiell Hammett's The Dain Curse. He designed the covers for the 1936 novel by Harry Hamilton on which the film Banjo on My Knee of the same year was based.

According to the author Martin Salisbury, Skrenda "was particularly adept at billowing skirts and heroic gazes", and his designs with their "melodrama and theatrically overwrought posing, have a richly appealing period charm".

== Military service ==
Skrenda served in both World Wars, firstly in the US Navy as a Seaman First Class on USS Harvard, then USS Texas, and was honorably discharged in November 1918 with the rank of Painter Third Class. In the Second World War, he enlisted in August 1942, joined the US Army, and was honorably discharged in June 1946 with the rank of Staff Sergeant.

== Personal life ==
Skrenda never married, nor had any children. He died aged 81 on March 16, 1978, in the Veterans Administration Hospital in Houston, Texas.
