= James R. Casserly =

American lawyer

James R. Casserly (born October 17, 1942) was an American lawyer and politician.

Casserly was born in California and graduated from DeLaSalle High School, in Minneapolis, Minnesota. He received his bachelor's degree in 1964 from Saint John's University and his Juris Doctor degree in 1967 from the University of Minnesota Law School. Casserly was admitted to the Minnesota bar and lived in Minneapolis with his wife and family. Casserly served in the Minnesota House of Representatives from 1973 to 1980 and was a Democrat.
