= John R. Arlandson =

American lawyer

John R. Arlandson (born April 30, 1944) was an American lawyer and politician.

Arlandson was born in Minneapolis, Minnesota and graduated from DeLaSalle High School in Minneapolis. He received his bachelor's degree from the University of Minnesota and his Juris Doctor degree from the University of Minnesota Law School. Arlandson lived in Golden Valley, Minnesota with his wife and family and practiced law. He was involved with Volunteers in Service to America (VISTA) in Duluth, Minnesota. He served as a special assistant attorney general for the Minnesota Attorney General and as a legislative assistant for United States Senator Walter Mondale. Arlandson served in the Minnesota House of Representatives from 1975 to 1978 and was a Democrat.
