= Robert George Marshall =

American businessman and politician

Robert George Marshall Sr. (March 4, 1893 – March 20, 1957) was an American businessman and politician.

Marshall was born in Minneapolis, Minnesota and went to the Minneapolis public schools. He served in the United States Army during World War I. Marshall lived in Minneapolis with his wife and family. He was involved in the advertising and lumber businesses. He served in the Minnesota Senate from 1931 to 1938. Marshall died in Minneapolis, Minnesota.
