= Kreiser =

Surname list

Kreiser is a surname. Notable people with the surname include:

- Alexander Kreiser (1901–1993), American Naval Aviator
- Dunja Kreiser (born 1971), German politician
- Walter Kreiser (1898–1958), German aircraft designer

== See also ==
- Elizabeth Amy Kreiser Weisburger (1924–2019), American chemist
