= Corey Colehour =

American gridiron football player (born 1945)

Profile
- Position: Quarterback

Personal information
- Born: September 2, 1945 (age 81); Minneapolis, Minnesota, U.S.
- Listed height: 6 ft 3 in (1.91 m)
- Listed weight: 210 lb (95 kg)

Career information
- High school: Southwest (Minneapolis)
- College: North Dakota
- NFL draft: 1967: 7th round, 162nd overall pick

Career history
- Atlanta Falcons (1967–1968)*; Edmonton Eskimos (1968–1969); Denver Broncos (1970)*
- * Offseason or practice squad member only

Awards and highlights
- 2× All-North Central Conference (1965, 1966)

Career CFL statistics
- Comp-Att: 182–330
- Passing yards: 2,256
- TD–INT: 10–20
- Rushing yards: 82
- Rushing touchdowns: 6

Corey Colehour (born September 2, 1945) is an American former professional football player who was a quarterback in the Canadian Football League (CFL). He played college football for the North Dakota Fighting Hawks.

== Early life ==
Colehour was born and grew up in Minneapolis, Minnesota and attended Southwest High School, where he played football and basketball. As a senior he was named the MVP of the Minneapolis City Conference in basketball.

== College career ==
Colehour was a three-year starter at North Dakota. He was named All-North Central Conference (NCC) as junior. Colehour was again named All-NCC and the conference MVP as a senior after passing for 2,175 yards and 19 touchdowns. He was named the MVP of the 1966 Pecan Bowl after passing for 274 yards and four touchdowns in a 42–24 win over Parsons College. Over the course of his collegiate career, Colehour completed 312 of 581 pass attempts for 4,520 yards with 36 touchdown passes. He was inducted into the North Dakota's Athletic Hall of Fame in 1983.

== Professional career ==
Colehour was selected 162nd overall by the Atlanta Falcons in the seventh round of the 1967 NFL/AFL draft. He spent 1967 on the Falcons' practice squad and was cut during training camp in 1968. Colehour was signed by the Edmonton Eskimos of the Canadian Football League (CFL) for the rest of the team's season. He led the Eskimos with 1,947 passing yards in 1969. Colehour was released by Edmonton on July 27, 1970, during final roster cuts. He was signed as a running back by the Denver Broncos on August 3, 1970, but was cut seven days later.
