= Ben Coleman (basketball) =

American basketball player (1961–2019)

Personal information
- Born: November 14, 1961 Minneapolis, Minnesota, U.S.
- Died: January 6, 2019 (aged 57) Minneapolis, Minnesota, U.S.
- Listed height: 6 ft 9 in (2.06 m)
- Listed weight: 235 lb (107 kg)

Career information
- High school: North (Minneapolis, Minnesota)
- College: Minnesota (1979–1981); Maryland (1982–1984)
- NBA draft: 1984: 2nd round, 37th overall pick
- Drafted by: Chicago Bulls
- Playing career: 1984–1997
- Position: Power forward
- Number: 40, 54, 44, 51

Career history
- 1984–1986: Stefanel Trieste
- 1986–1988: New Jersey Nets
- 1988–1989: Philadelphia 76ers
- 1989–1990: Milwaukee Bucks
- 1990–1991: Elosúa León
- 1991–1992: FC Barcelona Bàsquet
- 1992–1993: Argal Huesca
- 1993–1994: Rapid City Thrillers
- 1994: Detroit Pistons
- 1994: Burghy Roma
- 1994–1995: Panapesca Montecatini
- 1996–1997: Sioux Falls Skyforce
- 1997: Omaha Racers

Career highlights
- 2× Second-team All-ACC (1983, 1984)
- Stats at NBA.com
- Stats at Basketball Reference

Benjamin Coleman (November 14, 1961 – January 6, 2019) was an American professional basketball player. He played college basketball for the Minnesota Golden Gophrs and the Maryland Terrapins. Professionally, he played five seasons in the National Basketball Association (NBA) as well as in Italy and Spain.

== Early life ==
Coleman was born on November 14, 1961, in Minneapolis. He played basketball at North Community High School. After graduation, he received a scholarship to play at the University of Minnesota. In 1979, he became the first player from Minneapolis North to receive a scholarship from a Division I college. He was also the first African-American player from a Minneapolis City Conference school to play for Minnesota.

He spent much of his time at Minnesota coming off the bench. In his redshirt freshman year of 1980–1981, he averaged 8.4 points and 5.1 rebounds per game. After that season, he decided to transfer to the University of Maryland. Coleman commented that he was able to make a statement for his community by playing for his hometown Gophers, but also faced a lot of pressure playing there. Under transfer rules, he sat out the 1981–1982 season.

At Maryland, Coleman teamed up with Len Bias, who went on to be the second overall pick in the 1986 NBA draft. He won two All-ACC honors and helped the team to the 1984 Atlantic Coast Conference championship and to a Sweet Sixteen appearance in the 1984 NCAA tournament.

== Professional career ==
After graduation, he was selected by the Chicago Bulls in the second round (37th overall) in the 1984 NBA draft. He did not make the Bulls roster and decided to sign with Stefanel Trieste in Italy's Serie A. The Bulls traded his rights to the Portland Trail Blazers for Mike Smrek, but he again failed to make the team and returned to Italy. After two years in Italy, he returned to the United States and signed with the New Jersey Nets.

In the middle of his second season with the Nets, New Jersey traded him and Mike Gminski to the Philadelphia 76ers for Roy Hinson and Tim McCormick. He played the remainder of the 1988–89 season in Philadelphia. Before the 1989–90 NBA season, he signed with the Milwaukee Bucks but his season was cut short due to injury in February and he was waived.

The following season he began a three-year stint in Spain, signing with Baloncesto León in Spain. He moved to FC Barcelona and CB Peñas Huesca.

For the 1993–94 NBA season, Coleman returned to the U.S. with the Rapid City Thrillers of the Continental Basketball Association. He signed a ten-day contract with the Detroit Pistons. After Detroit did not retain him, he played on a rest-of-season contract with Roma and the following season with Montecatiniterme Basketball in Italy.

He ended his playing career with the Sioux Falls Skyforce and Omaha Racers of the CBA.

After he retired, Coleman coached in the greater Minneapolis area with the private coaching service, CoachUp.

Coleman died on January 6, 2019, at age 57.

== NBA career statistics ==
Legend
GP	Games played	GS	Games started	MPG	Minutes per game
FG%	Field goal percentage	3P%	3-point field goal percentage	FT%	Free throw percentage
RPG	Rebounds per game	APG	Assists per game	SPG	Steals per game
BPG	Blocks per game	PPG	Points per game	**Bold**	Career high

=== Regular season ===
Year	Team	GP	GS	MPG	FG%	3P%	FT%	RPG	APG	SPG	BPG	PPG
1986–87	New Jersey	**68**	7	15.1	**.581**	.000	.727	4.2	0.5	0.5	0.5	6.6
1987–88	New Jersey	27	10	**24.3**	.483	.000	.774	**6.4**	**1.4**	**1.0**	**0.6**	**11.0**
1987–88	Philadelphia	43	**14**	19.6	.516	.000	.752	4.1	0.5	0.3	**0.6**	6.9
1988–89	Philadelphia	58	11	12.1	.485	.000	.792	3.1	0.3	0.2	0.3	5.1
1989–90	Milwaukee	22	0	13.9	.474	.000	**.829**	4.0	0.5	0.3	0.3	5.7
1993–94	Detroit	9	0	8.6	.480	.000	.500	2.9	0.0	0.2	0.2	3.1
Career		227	42	15.9	.516	.000	.759	4.1	0.6	0.4	0.4	6.6

=== Playoffs ===
Year	Team	GP	GS	MPG	FG%	3P%	FT%	RPG	APG	SPG	BPG	PPG
1988–89	Philadelphia	3	0	7.7	.750	.000	1.000	1.7	0.0	0.3	0.0	4.7
