= Fryberger =

Fryberger is a surname. Notable people with the surname include:

- Agnes Moore Fryberger (1868–1939), American music educator, lecturer, and author
- Dates Fryberger (born 1940), American ice hockey player
