= Fredrick Burgan =

American football player and coach

Frederick Burgan
Biographical details
- Born: January 1, 1881; Alexandria, Minnesota, U.S.
- Died: January 26, 1935 (aged 54); Hennepin County, Minnesota

Playing career
- 1903–1905: Minnesota
- Positions: Right end, right halfback

Coaching career (HC unless noted)
- 1906–1907: North Community HS (MN)
- 1908–1909: Hamline

Frederick Preston Burgan (January 1, 1881 – January 26, 1935) was an American football player and coach. He served as the head football coach at Hamline University from 1908 to 1909.

He later worked as a dentist.
