= Project Success (organization) =

Youth-development organization in Minneapolis

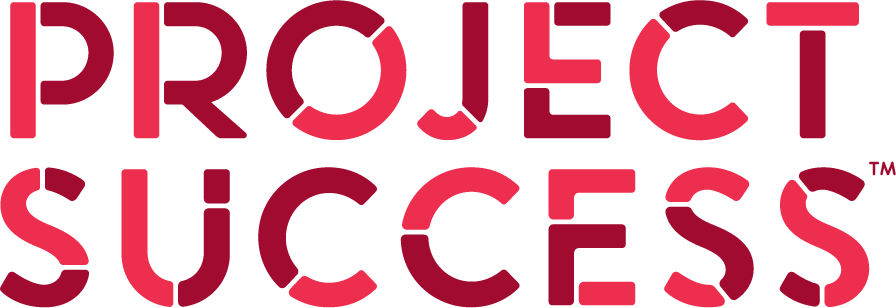
- The logo of Project Success.
- Founded: 1994
- Headquarters: Minneapolis, Minnesota
- Founder and Executive Director: Adrienne Diercks
- Website: https://www.projectsuccess.org/

Project Success is a youth-development organization serving students in the Minneapolis Public Schools and Mankato Area Public Schools. They offer programs such as free tickets to professional theatre productions and global and local trips.

== History ==
On February 6, 2026, Project Success and Broadway Unlocked live-streamed Dear Minneapolis: A #Giveback Concert.
