= List of North Dakota Fighting Hawks in the NFL draft =

This is a list of North Dakota Fighting Hawks football players in the NFL draft.

== Key ==
B	Back	K	Kicker	NT	Nose tackle
C	Center	LB	Linebacker	FB	Fullback
DB	Defensive back	P	Punter	HB	Halfback
DE	Defensive end	QB	Quarterback	WR	Wide receiver
DT	Defensive tackle	RB	Running back	G	Guard
E	End	T	Offensive tackle	TE	Tight end

== Selections ==
Year	Round	Pick	Player	Team	Position	Notes
1939	18	164	Charlie Gainor	Philadelphia Eagles	E	
1956	12	139	Steve Myhra	Baltimore Colts	G	
1960	16	182	Don Kaczmarek	Los Angeles Rams	T	
1965	13	176	Dave Osborn	Minnesota Vikings	B	
1966	7	99	David Lince	Philadelphia Eagles	T	
1966	9	134	Ron Green	Minnesota Vikings	WR	
1967	7	162	Corey Colehour	Atlanta Falcons	QB	
1967	14	342	Jim Hester	New Orleans Saints	TE	
1972	3	54	Jim LeClair	Cincinnati Bengals	LB	
1973	9	216	Mike Deutsch	Chicago Bears	RB	
1974	17	438	Lawrie Skolrood	Dallas Cowboys	T	
1975	12	294	Ron Gustafson	New Orleans Saints	WR	
1976	13	357	Dale Kasowski	Chicago Bears	RB	
1977	12	323	Scott Martin	San Francisco 49ers	G	
1977	12	331	Bill Deutsch	Baltimore Colts	RB	
1979	10	262	Steve Sybeldon	New York Jets	T	
1980	11	287	Dale Markham	Kansas City Chiefs	DT	
1981	5	124	Todd Thomas	Kansas City Chiefs	T	
1987	6	161	Tracy Martin	New York Jets	WR	
1989	11	307	Norm McGee	San Francisco 49ers	WR	
1991	9	229	Dean Witkowski	Green Bay Packers	LB	
1999	2	44	Jim Kleinsasser	Minnesota Vikings	TE	
2006	5	161	Chris Kuper	Denver Broncos	G	
2022	5	155	Matt Waletzko	Dallas Cowboys	OT	
