= Fue Lee =

American politician (born 1991)

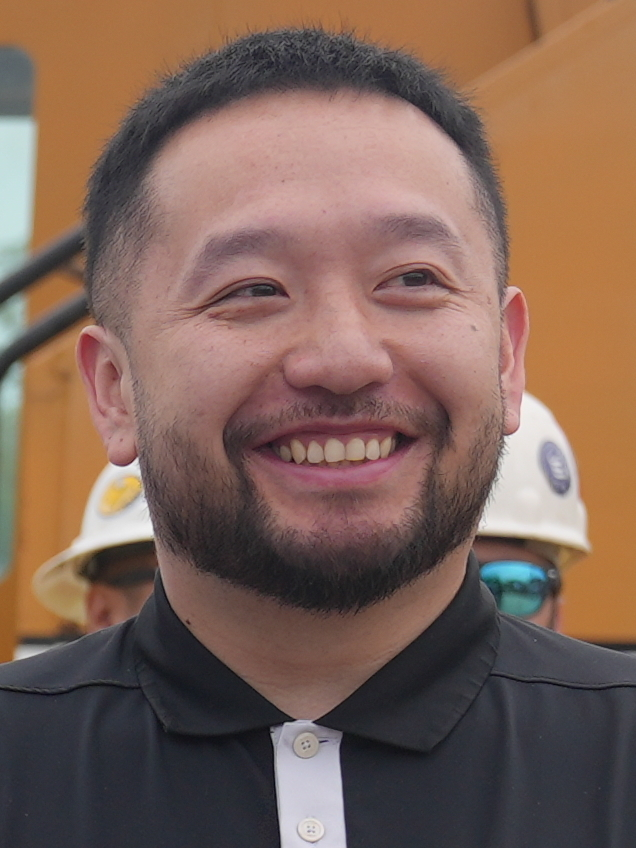

Member of the Minnesota House of Representatives from the 59A district
- Incumbent
- Assumed office January 3, 2017
- Preceded by: Joe Mullery

Personal details
- Born: August 26, 1991 (age 35) Thailand
- Party: Democratic (DFL)
- Education: Carleton College (B.A.)
- Occupation: Legislator
- Website: Government website Campaign website

Fue Lee (born August 26, 1991) is a Hmong-American politician serving in the Minnesota House of Representatives since 2016. A member of the Minnesota Democratic–Farmer–Labor Party (DFL), Lee represents district 59A, which includes parts of northern Minneapolis in Hennepin County.

== Early life, education, and career ==
Lee was born in a refugee camp in Thailand to Hmong parents from Laos, and came to Minnesota as a toddler in 1992, living in public housing with his parents and siblings. He graduated from Camden High School in Minneapolis, Minnesota.

Lee graduated from Carleton College in Northfield, Minnesota, with a bachelor's degree in political science and international relations. He was an intern or volunteer for Minneapolis City Council Member Blong Yang, then-U.S. Representative Keith Ellison, and Steve Simon, later becoming an aide in the office of the Minnesota Secretary of State.

Lee co-founded the Asian American Organizing Project and Progressive Hmong American Organizers with former state Senator Mee Moua, DFL activist Yee Chang, and state representative Jay Xiong.

== Minnesota House of Representatives ==
Lee was elected to the Minnesota House of Representatives in 2016 and has been reelected every two years since. He defeated 10-term incumbent Joe Mullery in a DFL primary after losing the party endorsement by one delegate. Lee is the first person of color and of Asian descent to represent his district, and was the first Hmong-American to represent Minneapolis in the state legislature. In 2018, he was an early endorser of Ilhan Omar for Minnesota's 5th congressional district.

Lee has served as chair of the Capital Investment Committee since 2021. He also sits on the Environment and Natural Resources Finance and Policy and Legacy Finance Committees. From 2019 to 2020, he served as vice chair of the Capital Investment Committee and as an assistant majority leader for the House DFL Caucus. Lee is a member of the People of Color and Indigenous (POCI) Caucus and the Minnesota Asian-Pacific (MAP) Caucus.

=== Infrastructure and capital investment ===
As chair of the Capital Investment Committee, Lee worked with Senator Tom Bakk on a $518 million public works package in 2021, highlighting investments into housing infrastructure and small business redevelopment after civil unrest and protests following the murder of George Floyd. He authored subsequent legislation that would fund $1 billion in infrastructure projects across the state, which was opposed by House Republicans and Senator Bakk.

In 2022, Lee supported a $3.5 billion package, investing in local projects, housing, and focusing on marginalized communities throughout the state. In both 2021 and 2022, the proposals, which require a three-fifths majority to approve the sale of bonds, failed to pass.

Lee worked with Senator Sandy Pappas in 2023 to move forward both cash and bonding infrastructure bills prioritizing racial equity and addressing the climate and housing crises. Lee proposed building on previous years' plans and spending $2 billion in cash spending and an additional $2.2 billion in borrowing via bonds. In March 2023, the House passed a $1.9 billion deal that received bipartisan support to reach the three-fifths majority threshold, though the Senate failed to do the same with all Republicans voting against the bill.

He has authored legislation to partially fund the Upper Harbor Terminal, a city amphitheater proposal located in his district.

=== Public safety and criminal justice reform ===
Lee signed on to a letter by U.S. Representative Ilhan Omar asking the Department of Justice to expand its investigation into the Minneapolis Police Department following the murder of George Floyd. He co-sponsored a bill creating a commission to review how local government, police, and military responded to George Floyd protests in Minneapolis and St. Paul, including aid to community organizations in the area.

Lee supported voting "yes" on City Question 2, which would have renamed the Minneapolis Police Department the Minneapolis Department of Public Safety, removed minimum staffing levels for sworn officers, and shifted oversight of the new agency from the mayor’s office to the city council.

=== Environment and natural resources ===
Lee joined environmental advocates in pushing for the closing of a metal shredder in North Minneapolis after a stockpile caught fire. He wrote legislation that would require regulators to consider the cumulative exposure of pollutants before issuing permits to industries in environmental justice areas, and require the Pollution Control Agency to hold public hearings to solicit community feedback on facilities impacts. The bill was included in a larger 2022 environmental bill, but faced opposition from Senate Republicans. Lee introduced the legislation again in 2023, but the provisions were scaled back to only include the seven-county metro and other large cities in 2023 due to opposition from rural DFL members.

Lee has authored legislation to help Metro Transit buy electric busses and require them to transition to zero emissions. He has advocated for the Department of Natural Resources to do more outreach to hunters in the Twin Cities metropolitan area and to people of color, women and younger generations. He co-sponsored legislation to abolish commercial turtle harvesting in the state.

=== Other political positions ===
Lee co-authored legislation to increase funding for efforts to ensure every Minnesotan was counted in the 2020 census, and wrote a bill to require property managers to give census workers access to multi-unit buildings. He co-sponsored legislation to increase funding for school support services in Minneapolis public schools.

Lee signed on to a statement opposing President Donald Trump's proposal to end the Deferred Action for Childhood Arrivals (DACA) policy. In 2019, he signed a letter of support for Representative Ilhan Omar after she was accused of making antisemitic comments.

== Electoral history ==
2016 DFL primary for Minnesota State House - District 59A
Party	Candidate	Votes	%
Democratic (DFL)	Fue Lee	1,584	55.52
Democratic (DFL)	Joe Mullery (incumbent)	1,268	44.48
Total votes		2,852	100.00

2016 Minnesota State House - District 59A
Party	Candidate	Votes	%
Democratic (DFL)	Fue Lee	12,585	80.62
Republican	Jessica Newville	2,903	18.60
Write-in		123	0.79
Total votes		15,611	100.00
Democratic (DFL) hold			

2018 Minnesota State House - District 59A
Party	Candidate	Votes	%
Democratic (DFL)	Fue Lee (incumbent)	12,046	86.04
Republican	Fred Statema	1,916	13.69
Write-in		38	0.27
Total votes		14,000	100.00
Democratic (DFL) hold			

2020 Minnesota State House - District 59A
Party	Candidate	Votes	%
Democratic (DFL)	Fue Lee (incumbent)	12,409	74.87
Grassroots—LC	Marcus Harcus	4,054	24.46
Write-in		110	0.66
Total votes		16,573	100.00
Democratic (DFL) hold			

2022 Minnesota State House - District 59A
Party	Candidate	Votes	%
Democratic (DFL)	Fue Lee (incumbent)	8,960	98.10
Write-in		174	1.90
Total votes		9,134	100.00
Democratic (DFL) hold			

2024 Minnesota State House - District 59A
Party	Candidate	Votes	%
Democratic (DFL)	Fue Lee (incumbent)	11,672	97.93
Write-in		247	2.07
Total votes		11,919	100.00
Democratic (DFL) hold			

== Personal life ==
Lee lives in the Northside neighborhood of Minneapolis, Minnesota. In September 2020, Lee was diagnosed with COVID, as were many members of his family. Lee spoke publicly about his families experience and spoke in favor of comprehensive, state-led efforts to contain the virus.
