= Clara Elizabeth Fanning =

American editor and compiler

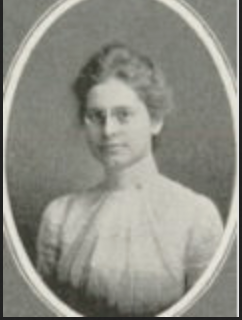
- Fanning in 1901
- Born: October 11, 1878; Manchester, New Hampshire, U.S.
- Died: October 8, 1938 (aged 59); Minneapolis, Minnesota, U.S.
- Education: University of Minnesota
- Occupations: Editor, compiler
- Writing career
- Genre: Reference works

Clara Elizabeth Fanning (October 11, 1878 – October 8, 1938) was an American editor and compiler from New Hampshire. She moved to Minnesota as a child and graduated from the University of Minnesota. Fanning served as editor of two journals, and she compiled a number of reference works on topics such as direct primaries, capital punishment, conservation, and the election of United States senators. She was a member of several professional and civic organizations, including Kappa Alpha Theta and the Daughters of the American Revolution (DAR). Fanning was also affiliated with the Minneapolis Public Library.

== Early life and education ==
Clara Elizabeth Fanning was born in Manchester, New Hampshire, October 11, 1878. Her parents were John Thomas Fanning and Louise (Bensley) Fanning. The family came to Minnesota in 1886.

Fanning was educated in Central High School, Minneapolis and afterwards, at the University of Minnesota where she obtained degrees of B. S. in 1901 and M. A. in 1903.

== Career ==
Fanning was the editor of Kappa Alpha Theta Journal, 1905-1907 and of Book Review Digest, 1905-1915.

She contributed several volumes in the Debaters' Handbook Series, each of which contained affirmative and negative briefs, references, and reprints of selected articles on popular subjects for debate. These included Selected Articles on Direct Primaries, Selected Articles on Capital Punishment, Selected Articles on Conservation of National Resources, Selected Articles on Election of United States Senators, Selected Articles on Enlargement of the United States Navy, and Selected Articles on Russia.

Some of these went through multiple editions. The first edition of the Selected Articles on Direct Primaries handbook was published in 1905, but when the third edition was brought out in 1911, the matter contained in the first small volume was largely discarded in favor of later reprints, making a practically new work. The fourth edition was a revision and enlargement of the 1911 volume. Seventy-four pages of additional reprints, an enlarged brief, additions to the bibliography, and a table compiled by Gertrude E. Woodard of the law library of the University of Michigan, were the new features of this edition. The reprints included articles analyzing the strong and weak features of the various state laws, and excerpts from governors' messages offering endorsement or criticism.

The articles reprinted in Russia, History and Travel were selected as to tell the story of Russia's growth from the days of Rurik through 1914. The scope of the volume was indicated by a list of the various headings under which the material was arranged: History, The Russian Empire, Political and Social Problems, Religion, The Jews, Russia in the European War, The Revolution of 1917, Literature, Art and Music. Also included was a selected bibliography, directions for pronouncing Russian names, a glossary of Russian words, a chronology of important events, and an index.

Index to Dramatic Readings (with Agnes K. Silk) was a reference book aimed at public readers, dramatic teachers, and librarians. It indexed the contents of twenty-five volumes of collections of dramatic readings published in the years 1915 to 1924, chosen for their wide range of subjects. Selections were made available in numerous ways: by author, title, subject, by type of selection, occasion, and index of first lines and refrains.

Travel in the United States was part of the Study Outline Series.

She was a member of Kappa Alpha Theta, the College Woman's Club, Business Woman's Club, and the DAR. Fanning was also affiliated with the Minneapolis Public Library.

== Personal life ==
Clara Elizabeth Fanning never married. She died in Minneapolis in October 1938.

== Selected works ==
- Russia, History and Travel, 1917
- Selected Articles on Direct Primaries, 1918
- Selected Articles on Capital Punishment, 1909
- Selected Articles on Conservation of National Resources, 1919
- Selected Articles on Election of United States Senators, 1912
- Selected Articles on Enlargement of the United States Navy, 1910
- Selected articles on the Fortification of the Panama Canal, 1912
- Selected Articles on Russia, 1918
- Toaster's Handbook: Jokes, Stories, and Quotations, 1914
- Travel in the United States, 1916
- Index to Dramatic Readings (with Agnes K. Silk), 1925
Selected articles on the conservation of natural resources

Selected articles on capital punishment

Selected articles on direct primaries

Selected articles on the election of United States senators

England and Scotland- history and travel

Selected articles on the enlargement of the United States navy

Selected articles on Russia; history, description and politics

Russia, history and travel; a study outline, eighteen programs and a bibliography

Selected articles on the election of United States senators

Toaster's handbook; jokes, stories, and quotations

Travel in the United States; twenty-one programs and bibliography

The United States since the civil war; a study outine
