= Greg Murtha =

American football player (born 1957)

No. 78
- Position: Offensive tackle

Personal information
- Born: April 23, 1957 (age 69); Minneapolis, Minnesota, U.S.
- Listed height: 6 ft 6 in (1.98 m)
- Listed weight: 268 lb (122 kg)

Career information
- High school: Southwest (Minneapolis)
- College: Minnesota
- NFL draft: 1980: 6th round, 161st overall pick

Career history
- Philadelphia Eagles (1980)*; Minnesota Vikings (1981); Baltimore Colts (1982); New Jersey Generals (1983–1984)
- * Offseason or practice squad member only

Career NFL statistics
- Games played: 5
- Stats at Pro Football Reference

Gregory Thomas Murtha (born April 23, 1957) is an American former professional football player who was a tackle in the National Football League (NFL) and United States Football League (NFL). He played college football for the Minnesota Golden Gophers. Murtha played in the NFL for the Baltimore Colts in 1982 and the USFL's New Jersey Generals from 1983 to 1984.
