= Arnulf Ueland =

American politician

Arnuff Ueland, Jr. (June 21, 1920 – July 15, 2004) was an American businessman and politician.

Ueland was born in Saint Paul, Minnesota and graduated from West High School in Minneapolis, Minnesota. He went to Dartmouth College and received his bachelor's degree in political science from University of Minnesota in 1943. Ueland served in the United States Navy during World War II. Ueland lived in North Mankato, Minnesota with his wife and family. He owned the Ueland Lumber Sales Company. Ueland served in the Minnesota Senate from 1973 to 1980. He was a Republican. He died at St. Joseph's Hospital in Mankato, Minnesota.
