= Agnes Moore Fryberger =

American music educator, lecturer, and author

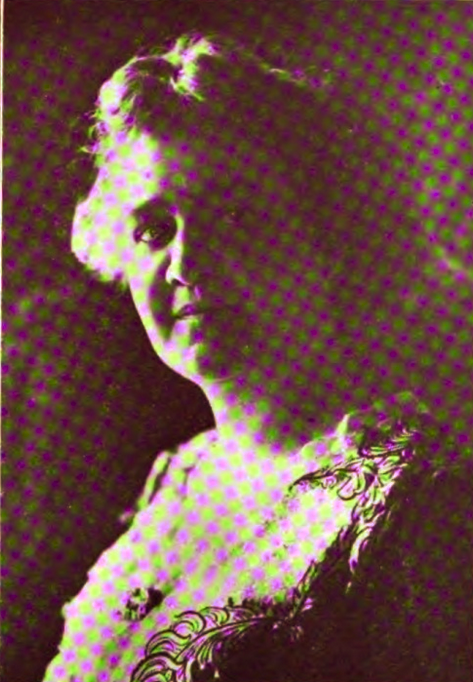
- Born: Agnes Ruth Moore; May 30, 1868; Madison, Indiana, U.S.
- Died: September 16, 1939 (aged 71); Minneapolis, Minnesota, U.S.
- Education: University of Minnesota; Teachers College, Columbia University
- Occupations: music educator; lecturer; author
- Spouse: William Othneil Fryberger (m. 1891; died 1923)
- Writing career
- Subject: Music
- Notable work: Listening Lessons in Music

Agnes Moore Fryberger (May 30, 1868 - September 16, 1939) was an American music educator, lecturer, and author, as well as a clubwoman. She was a pioneer in the northwestern U.S. in lecture recitals on opera. Fryberger served as the Educational Director of the Minneapolis Symphony Orchestra (1924–25), and of the St. Louis Symphony Orchestra (1926–30). She was the first director of music appreciation at the University of Louisville. Her book, Listening Lessons in Music (1916), used in France, England, and the Philippines, was the first text that incorporated phonograph records into a school lesson's grading process.

== Early life and education ==
Agnes Ruth Moore was born in Madison, Indiana, May 30, 1868. She was the daughter of Benjamin F. Moore and Florence Virginia Wilber, descendants of Colonial families, who moved to Minneapolis in 1883.

She was a graduate of Central High School and the University of Minnesota. Fryberger was also a graduate of the Northwestern Conservatory of Music. She held a licentiate degree from the Minnesota Music Teachers' Association, a diploma from the American Institute Normal Methods, and was a student at the Teachers College, Columbia University. She also trained with George Armstrong in Leipzig, and C. F. Morse in Brooklyn.

== Career ==
=== Music educator ===
She was the official lecturer for the Chicago Opera Company, 1907 to 1910. In 1911, she began distinctive educational work as assistant music supervisor in the Minneapolis Public Schools. She went on to become a member of the Examining Board of the Minnesota Music Teachers' Association.

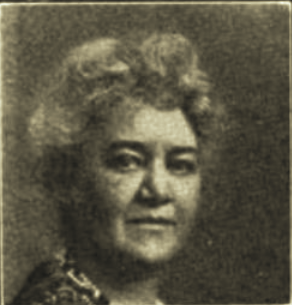
Agnes Moore Fryberger (1925)

From 1914 to 1916, she was the director of the public school music department at the Minneapolis School of Music and Oratory. She was also the faculty teacher at the American Normal Institute (summer school) in Evanston, Illinois, 1914 to 1917. Fryberger was an instructor at McPhail Music School, 1916 to 1920; and at the College of Education, University of Minnesota, 1918 to 1920. In 1920, Fryberger developed a new method of teaching music appreciation through phonograph, and published a text, Listening Lessons in Music. She also wrote program notes for children's concerts and articles for music journals. She taught summer sessions at the American Institute Normal Methods, Cleveland School of Education, Indiana University, and numerous county institutions. She was the Director of Music at the Teacher's College in San Diego, California.

Fryberger came to the University of Louisville in 1932 as the school's first director of music appreciation. She retired from her professional career and closed her music studio on campus in 1938. At the same time, the student council established an annual song festival in her honor, first held on May 18, 1938.

=== Clubwoman ===
Fryberger was identified with club movements since 1891. She served as president of the Tourist Club and the Thursday Musical Clubs (1906–09); chair of the Music Department, Minnesota Federation of Women's Clubs (1908–12); and vice-chair of the Music Department, General Federation of Women's Clubs (1909–11). She was the professional representative in the Women's Rotary Club; music chair, Business Women's Club; director, Civic Music League; and identified with various philanthropic societies.

== Personal life ==
On August 24, 1891, she married William Othneil Fryberger (1860–1923).

She was a Congregationalist, Republican, and a member the Filson Club (Kentucky ancestors) and Daughters of the American Revolution.

Agnes Moore Fryberger died unexpectedly in Minneapolis, September 16, 1939.

== Selected works ==
Listening Lessons in Music, Graded for Schools

- Listening Lessons in Music, Graded for Schools, 1916 (Text)
- Kiddie Canticles
- Creative Listening
- Developed Method of Teaching Music Appreciation in Schools
- "Music Appreciation as Related to the Curriculum", 1920
