= George A. French (Minnesota politician) =

American lawyer and politician

George A. French (March 19, 1901 – February 8, 1992) was an American lawyer and politician.

French was born in Hartford, Connecticut and graduated from West High School in Minneapolis, Minnesota. French received his bachelor's degree in engineering from the University of Minnesota and his law degree from University of Minnesota Law School in 1927. He was admitted to the Minnesota bar and practiced law in Minneapolis. French lived in Minneapolis with his wife and family. He served in the Minnesota House of Representatives from 1941 to 1966 and was a Republican. French died from a heart attack at Memorial Hospital in St. Louis Park, Minnesota. The funeral and burial was in Minneapolis.
