= West High School (Minneapolis, Minnesota) =

High school in Minneapolis, Minnesota closed in 1982

Coordinates: 44.9514°N 93.2993°W

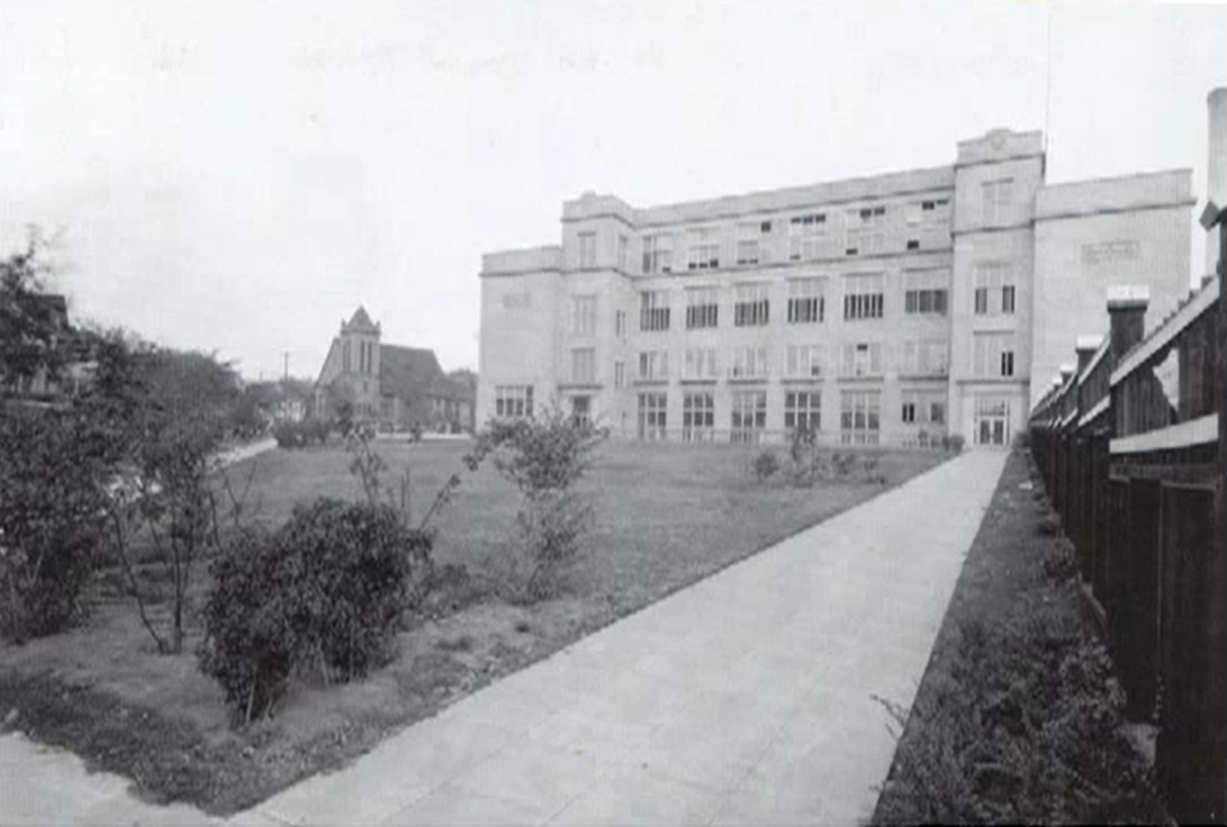
- West High School in 1908
- West 28th Street & Hennepin Avenue; Minneapolis, Minnesota; United States

Information
- Type: public
- Opened: 1908
- Closed: 1982
- School district: Minneapolis Public Schools

West High School (1908–1982) was a public high school in Minneapolis, Minnesota. Edward Stebbins designed the school building. Built in 1908 on what had recently been farmland, the school had a student capacity of 1,600 by 1917. Minneapolis Public Schools closed Central, West and Marshall-University high schools in 1982.

== Notable alumni ==
- James Arness, actor
- Curt Carlson, businessman
- Peter Edelman, lawyer, educator, government official
- Don Ellis, Jazz musician and band leader
- George A. French, lawyer and Minnesota state legislator
- Tippi Hedren, actress
- Alexander Kreiser, aviator and brigadier general
- Emery "Swede" Larson, football coach and Marine Corps officer
- Butch Levy (1921–1999), professional football player and pro wrestler
- C. Walton Lillehei, surgeon
- Fancy Ray McCloney, stand-up comedian
- Henrietta Mears, Christian educator and evangelist
- Mary Ellen Pinkham, humor columnist and author
- Dave Pirner, Soul Asylum
- Harry Reasoner, journalist and broadcaster
- Tommy Stinson, musician (did not graduate)
- Arnulf Ueland, Minnesota state senator and businessman
- Fred Vant Hull (1920–1975), professional football lineman with the Green Bay Packers
