= George C. Dahlvang =

American politician (1917–1990)

Member of the Minnesota House of Representatives from District 54A
- In office January 5, 1981 – January 2, 1983

Personal details
- Born: July 9, 1917 Minneapolis, Minnesota, U.S.
- Died: June 24, 1990 (aged 72) Robbinsdale, Minnesota, U.S.
- Party: Democratic (DFL)
- Spouse: Vera
- Children: 2
- Education: North Community High School; University of Minnesota
- Occupation: Politician

George G. Dahlvang (July 9, 1917 – June 24, 1990) was an American politician.

Dahlvang was born in Minneapolis, Minnesota and graduated from North Community High School, in Minneapolis, in 1935. He also took extension classes about labor law at the University of Minnesota. He served in the Seabees during World War II. Dahlvang lived in Minneapolis with his wife and family. He served on the Metropolitan Council from 1975 to 1981 and on an advisory committee for the Minneapolis City Council from 1977 to 1981. Dahlvang was a Democrat. He served in the Minnesota House of Representatives in 1981 and 1982. Dahlvang died from cancer at the hospice at the North Memorial Medical Center in Robbinsdale, Minnesota.
