= Gerald T. Mullin =

American lawyer and politician

Gearld T. Mullin (January 25, 1900 – April 28, 1982) was an American lawyer and politician.

== Early life and education ==
Mullin was born in Omaha, Nebraska and he moved to Minneapolis, Minnesota with his parents and family in 1907. He graduated from Minneapolis North High School in 1919. Mullin graduated from the University of St. Thomas, where he was the football team captain in 1924, and from William Mitchell College of Law (formerly Minnesota College of Law).

== Career ==
He practiced law in Minneapolis. He also worked for the American Railway Express Company. Mullin served in the Minnesota House of Representatives in 1929 and 1930 and in the Minnesota Senate from 1931 to 1957. He was a Democrat. Mullin then became President of Minnegasco.

== Personal life ==
Mullin served as an assistant coach of the St. Thomas College football team from 1929-1931.

He died at St. Mary's Hospital in Minneapolis, Minnesota.
