= Billy Beal =

American Canadian engineer and photographer

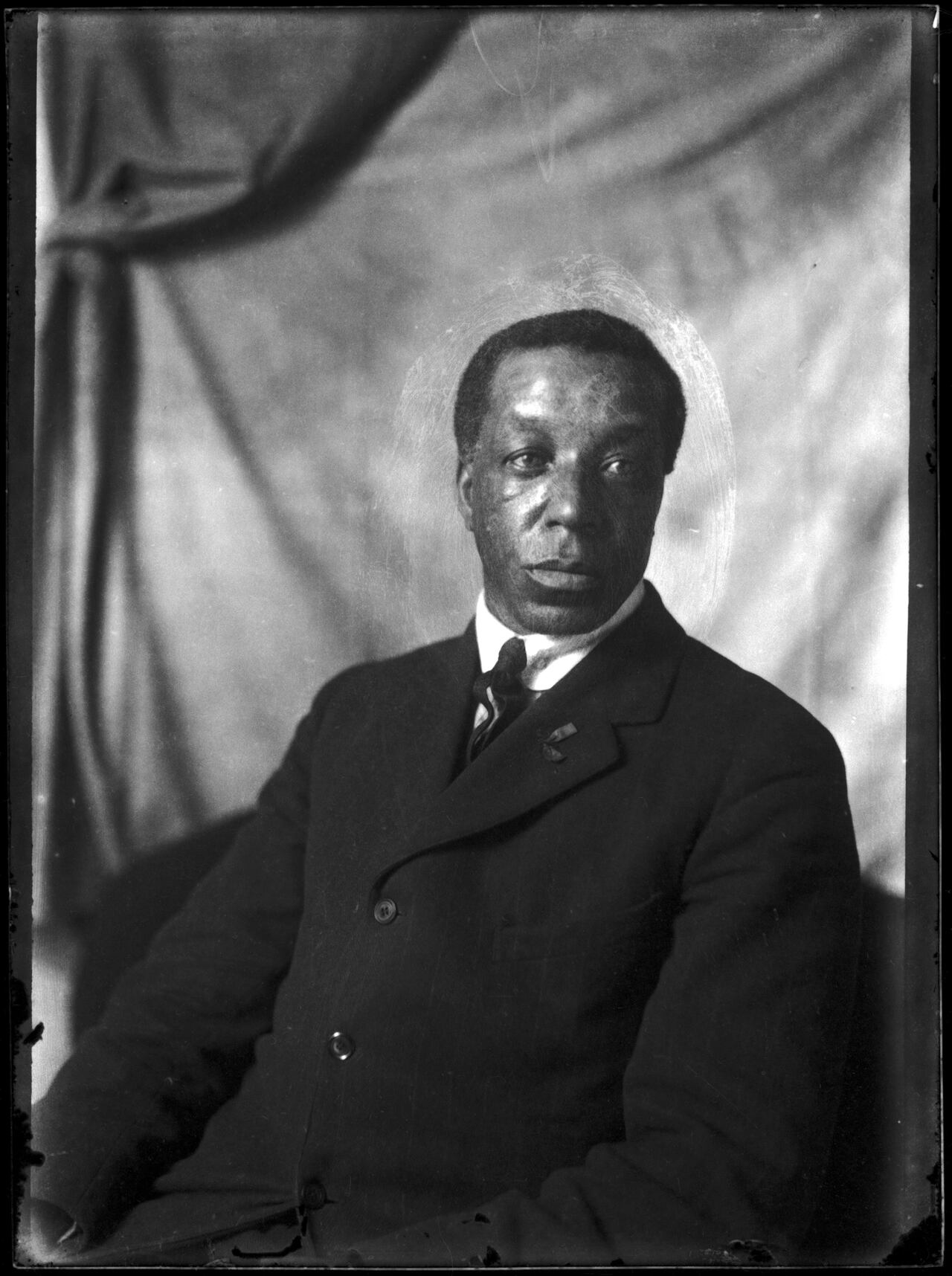
- Born: 16 January 1874; Chelsea
- Died: 25 January 1968 (aged 94); The Pas
- Alma mater: North Community High School
- Occupation: Photographer, engineer

William Sylvester Alpheus Beal (16 January 1874 – 25 January 1968) was a Canadian sawmill engineer. Beal was one of the first Black settlers to move to Manitoba and lived in Swan River Valley for almost sixty years, homesteading property there after his arrival in 1906. Among his many interests were book collecting and photography; his photographs have attracted attention for their artistic merit as well as being a record of pioneer life in rural Manitoba around 1920.

== Early life and education ==
William Sylvester Alpheus Beal was born 16 January 1874 in Chelsea, Massachusetts. His parents were Charles R. Beal, a bookseller, and Loretta H. Freeman. In the racial category of census records, his mother was listed as "mulatto" and his father was listed as "multiple"; they lived in a white neighborhood, suggesting they may have passed as white.

He grew up in Minneapolis, Minnesota, graduating from North Community High School in 1898.

== Arrival in Manitoba ==
Beal may have traveled to Montana and/or British Columbia before 1906, when he arrived in Swan River Valley. In the early 1900s, an aggressive campaign from the Canadian government encouraged people living in the United States to homestead in the prairies, in an effort to displace the First Nations and Métis people. Though advertisements targeted white people, Beal made his way to Manitoba to become an engineer. He was the first Black resident in the area. Five years after his arrival, the Canadian government banned Black people from immigrating to Canada.

His 1908 homesteading claim was conditional on requirements to build a house, clear the land, and plant at least fifteen acres within three years of arrival. Beal's land was in the Big Woody district, located 16 kilometres northwest of the town of Swan River. Because he signed up for a homestead later than other settlers, his land was poor quality scrub and he struggled with farming. Once he met the claim requirements, he rented out the bulk of his land and never farmed again.

== Career and avocations ==
Beal worked as a steam engineer for lumber mills in the area, including the Red Deer Lumber Mill. His salary afforded him the opportunity to pursue multiple interests, including building a personal library with books on topics such as science, law, astronomy and philosophy; he lent out volumes to his neighbors to read. His other interests included carpentry, electronics, and dressmaking. He made electric fences for cattle farmers in the area, and built furniture and toys for friends and neighbors. He built his own radio and constructed a telescope out of a stove pipe and soup cans.

Beal may also have had some medical training, as he assisted local doctors during crises such as the 1918 influenza pandemic and carried his own medical bag. He pulled teeth for local residents and assisted doctors in administering vaccinations.

=== Photography ===
Beal was a self-taught photographer. His photographs document homesteading in rural Manitoba from 1915 to 1925, primarily focusing on his friends and neighbors living in the area. Most of his work is portraiture set in outdoor locales in the Swan River Valley. About 50 photographic plates of his work are extant.

Art gallery director Alyssa Fearon writes about one of those images, a self-portrait:

In the image, Beal is bright-eyed and solemn-faced; his demeanour is stoic and self-assured. He's wearing a dapper suit and tie and is seated in front of a draped curtain backdrop. The compositional elements and lighting of the photograph indicate a serious level of thought on the photographer's part to convey an air of prosperity. Given that Beal's primary occupation as a sawmill engineer involved operating heavy machinery to process lumber, his everyday clothing would've been functional and rough – but in the photograph, he's dressed for a special occasion. He shows us exactly how he wanted to be remembered. During that time, the popular images of Black people that circulated in Canada were primarily racist and dehumanizing: blackface minstrelsy, Black people as childlike and in positions of servitude. In the self-portrait, however, Beal subverts the White gaze and presents a counter-image, in which he is dignified and poised — a pointed act of resistance to the mainstream misrepresentations.

=== Civic efforts ===
In 1912, Beal helped found the Big Woody School Division and was elected as its first secretary-treasurer; he served in that role for thirty-seven years. He helped start a circulating library in the school system, and also volunteered as the first secretary of the Big Woody Sunday School. In 1922 he helped establish a literary society and debating club, as well as encouraging arts in the area by directing plays and organizing poetry readings and musical concerts.

Beal attempted to volunteer for the Canadian Army medical corps in 1914, but he was denied access to the white troops and asked to join the coloured corps, he refused to enlist.

== Later life, death, and legacy ==
Beal was a lifelong bachelor and had no children. After living near Swan River for nearly sixty years, he moved to The Pas in 1955, where the nearest nursing home was located. Beal died in The Pas on 25 January 1968 and is buried in Lakeside Cemetery. He died a pauper and was buried with no headstone. In 1989, a memorial stone was created to recognize Beal's impact on his community. A plaque outside the Swan River Library was installed in 2015 to commemorate his legacy.

The Billy Beal Ice Fishing Derby was established in 1997, with proceeds donated to a medical assistance fund for residents of Swan River Valley. A biography, Billy: the Life and Photographs of William S.A. Beal, was published in 1998, featuring a selection of his photographs; an exhibit of the photos toured Manitoba and Nova Scotia. Beal's life was the subject of a 2010 film, Billy, directed by Black Manitoban filmmaker Winston Washington Moxam; the film was awarded the Manitoba Human Rights Commitment Award.

== Bibliography ==
- Barrow, Robert; Hambley, Leigh (1988). Billy: the Life and Photographs of William S.A. Beal. Winnipeg, Manitoba: Vig. Corps Press. ISBN 9780969369301. OCLC 1103525797.
