= Central High School (Minneapolis, Minnesota) =

High school in Minneapolis, Minnesota closed in 1982

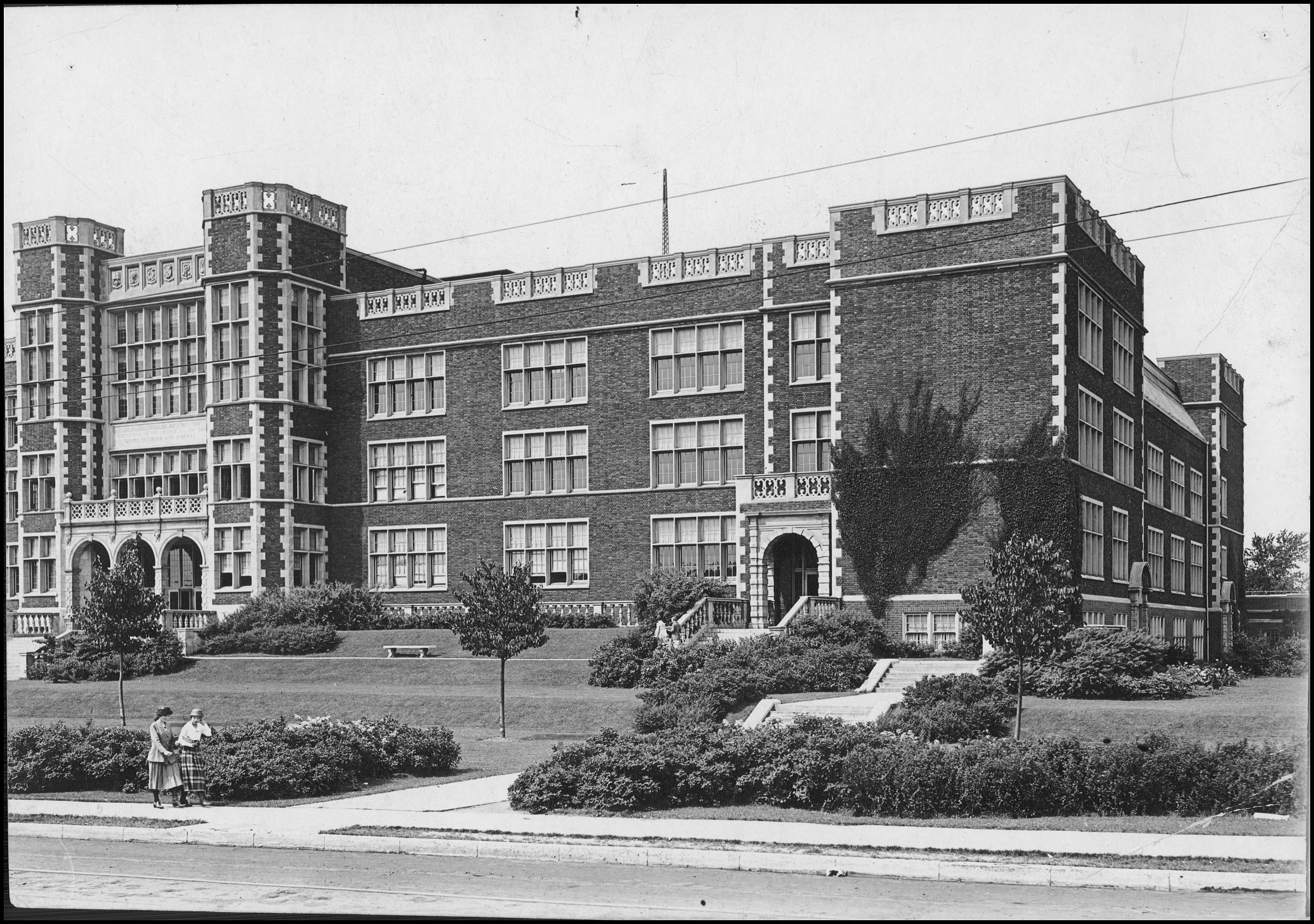
- Central High School in 1919

Location
- 4th Avenue South and 34th Street; Minneapolis, Minnesota; United States; 44°56′26″N 93°16′17″W

Information
- Type: Public
- Opened: 1860
- Closed: 1982
- School district: Minneapolis Public Schools
- Colors: Red and blue

Central High School (1860–1982) was a public high school in Minneapolis, Minnesota.

== History ==
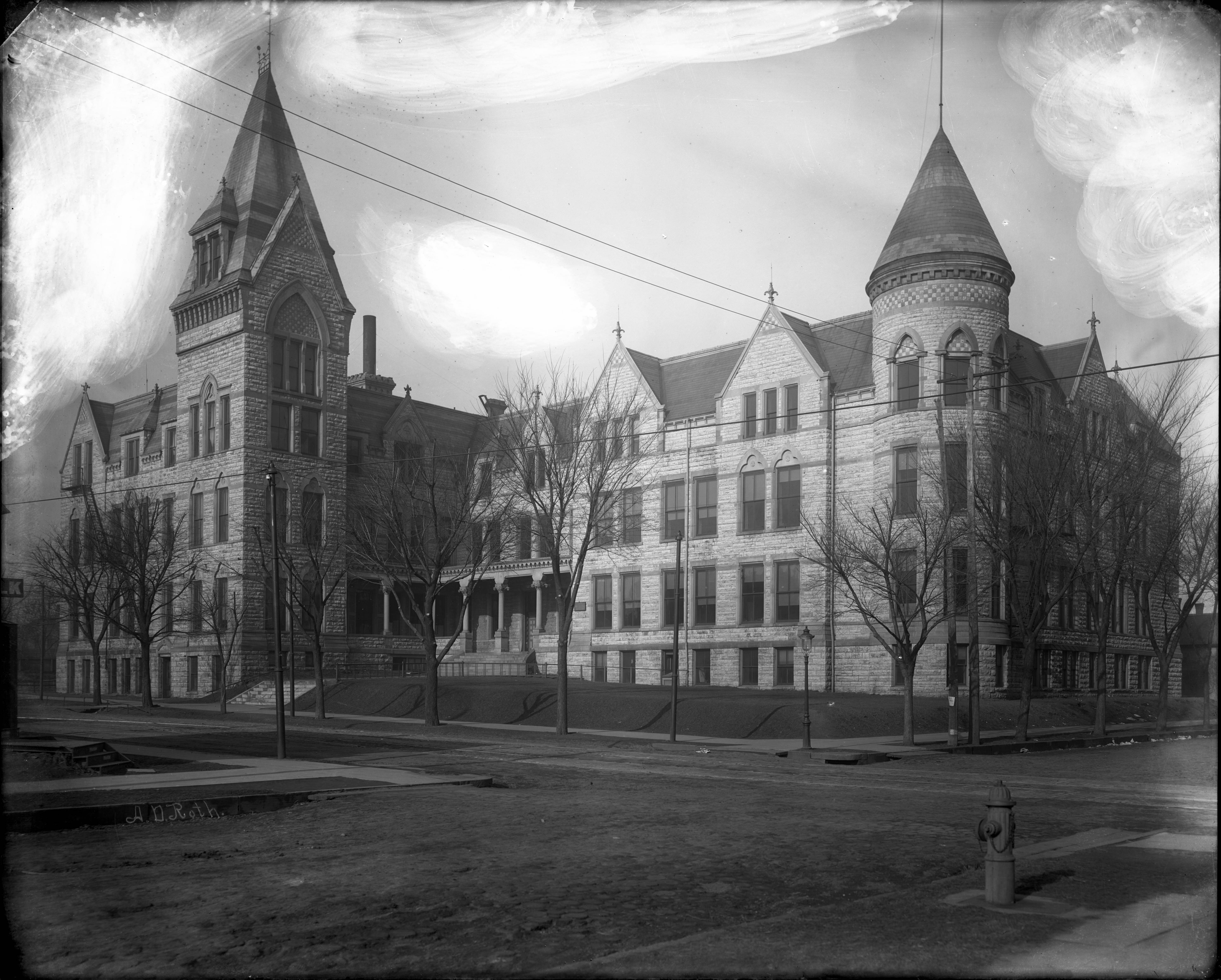
Central High School in 1902.

The school went through several phases. Central High was first established in 1860 when students of high-school age were added to Union Elementary. In 1864, the building was destroyed by fire and was rebuilt on the same site as Washington School, with grades K-12. A new building was erected in 1877, with the name changed to Central, on the corner of 4th Avenue South and 11th Street in downtown Minneapolis. Designed in Victorian Gothic style by Franklin Long and Charles Haglin, the building was described by Minneapolis architecture critic Larry Millett as "one of the most impressive buildings of its time in Minneapolis." It was expanded in 1886. In 1913, the school moved again, to 4th Avenue South and 34th Street, where it remained until closing in 1982. The new building was designed in the Collegiate Gothic architectural style.

Minneapolis Public Schools closed Central, West and Marshall-University high schools in 1982. Central and West were demolished shortly after, except for their recently built gyms.

== Notable alumni ==
- Cedric Adams, broadcaster
- Eddie Albert, actor
- Johnny Blanchard, New York Yankees catcher
- Clara Elizabeth Fanning, editor
- Orville Freeman, Minnesota governor
- Agnes Moore Fryberger, music educator
- Paul Granlund, sculptor
- Halsey Hall, sportswriter and broadcaster
- Pudge Heffelfinger, first professional American football player
- James Hong, actor
- John Kundla, basketball coach
- George Leach, Minneapolis mayor
- Rodney Lewis, professional football defensive back
- Bobby Lyle, jazz musician
- Edwin L. MacLean, politician
- Bobby Marshall, first African-American to play in the NFL
- Chris Mars, musician (did not graduate)
- Noel Neill, actress
- Prince, musician
- Sharon Sayles Belton, Minneapolis mayor
- Eric Sevareid, journalist and broadcaster
- Fred Sherman, actor
- Ann Sothern, actress
- Bob Sweiger, football player
- Paul Westerberg, musician (did not graduate)
