= Fred Vant Hull =

Canadian gridiron football player (1920–1975)

- Vant Hull in 1946

Profile
- Position: Guard

Personal information
- Born: August 21, 1920; Winnipeg, Manitoba, Canada
- Died: April 10, 1975 (aged 54); Minneapolis, Minnesota, U.S.
- Listed height: 6 ft 0 in (1.83 m)
- Listed weight: 214 lb (97 kg)

Career information
- High school: West (Minneapolis)
- College: Minnesota

Career history
- Green Bay Packers (1942)

Awards and highlights
- National champion (1940)

Career NFL statistics
- Games played: 8
- Starts: 0
- Stats at Pro Football Reference

Frederick Nels Vant Hull (August 21, 1920 – April 10, 1975) was a Canadian-born gridiron football player and announcer. He played 8 games for the Green Bay Packers of the National Football League (NFL) during the 1942 season before having his career cut short by World War II.

Vant Hull was a member of the undefeated 1940 Minnesota Golden Gophers football team which claimed the Associated Press national championship during the 1940 season.

== Early life ==
Fred Vant Hull was born in Winnipeg, Manitoba, Canada. He attended West High School in Minneapolis, Minnesota, for whom he played football, starting at left tackle as a junior in 1936.

A contemporary news story in the Minneapolis Star described Vant Hull as a "blond star who would rather scrimmage without headgear, a tough-as-nails boy with a thorough knowledge of his position." He played collegiately for the Minnesota Golden Gophers. He entered the program in the fall of 1938, initially listed as a guard on the freshman team. He was joined at Minnesota by his former West High School linemate, Butch Levy, another tough and skilled player who would spend time in professional football. The 1940 Golden Gophers team, for which Vant Hull started as a junior, posted an undefeated record of 8–0–0 and were honored by the members of the Associated Press as the country's National Champions of the 1940 season.

== Pro career and World War II ==
After graduation, Vant Hull played professionally for the National Football League (NFL). He saw action in eight games for the Packers during the 1942 season before World War II interrupted his career. During the war he was a member of the United States Navy.

== Post-war ==
In 1946, with the war at an end, Vant Hull attempted to resume his career with the Los Angeles Dons of the All-America Football Conference but was unable to make the team's final roster.

He contracted polio and was subsequently paralyzed, requiring a wheelchair as an assistive device, in the 1952-1955 time frame. At that time he was an announcer for KEYD, an AM radio station in Minneapolis.

Fred Vant Hull died in Minneapolis on April 10, 1975. He was 54 years old at the time of his death.
