= Sullivan STEAM School =

Public magnet school in Minneapolis, Minnesota, US

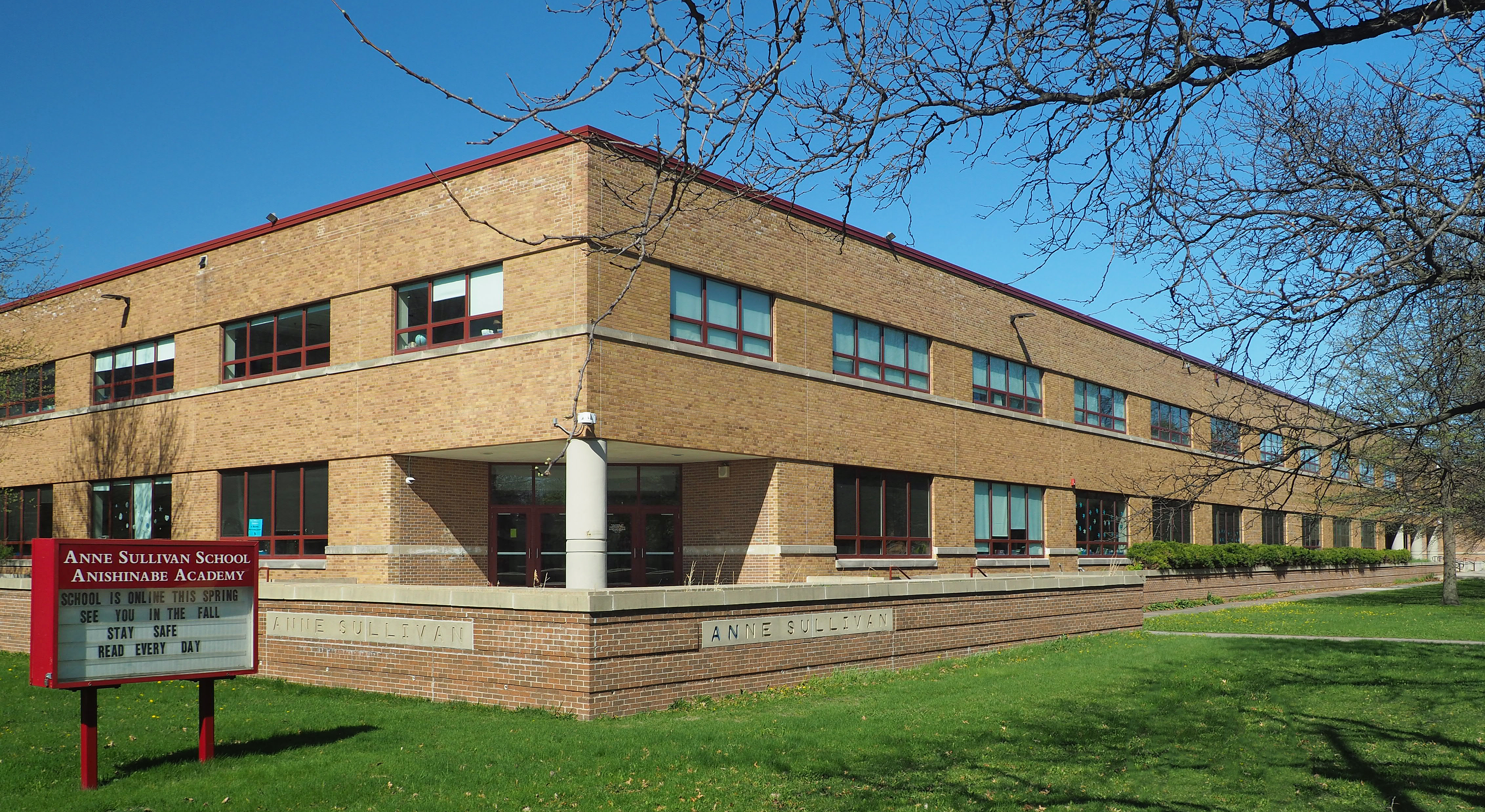
- Sullivan STEAM School from the southwest

Location
- 3100 East 28th Street; Minneapolis, Minnesota; United States; 44°57′9″N 93°13′32″W

Information
- Type: Public magnet school
- Established: 1991 (previously Seward School)
- School district: Minneapolis Public Schools
- Principal: Jennifer Hedberg
- Faculty: 54.00 (FTE)
- Grades: K-8
- Enrollment: 587 (2018-19)
- Student to teacher ratio: 10.87
- Campus: Urban
- Colors: Black, White
- Mascot: Sting
- Website: http://sullivan.mpls.k12.mn.us/

Sullivan STEAM School is a school in Minneapolis, Minnesota, United States, which serves 600 students from preschool through eighth grade. The School houses a whole-day Kindergarten program as well as Early Childhood Special Education and Early Family Childhood Education programs. Anne Sullivan School shares an attendance area with and is a feeder school for Minneapolis South High School. Specialist Subjects include Media, 5th- 8th Grade Band, Fitness, Health, Physical Education and Dance/Drama.

Anne Sullivan School supplements their core curriculum with a Gifted & Talented program, a peer mediation program and the Second Step Social Skills Program and houses a large Deaf/Hard-of-Hearing program for all grades and incorporates Mainstreaming as well as self-contained resource rooms. D/HH Students also participate in many local and state-wide extra curricular programs for the deaf. Technology used at Sullivan includes four computer lab and a wireless mobile digital media labs.

The school is named after Anne Sullivan (1866–1936), teacher and companion to Helen Keller.

== Extra Curricular Programs ==
Arts for Academic Achievement

KBEM-FM news: Periodically school news is made available to the public via the website of local radio station KBEM-FM.

Project Success: A series of workshops for students focusing on working toward goals and achieving in school through the use of teacher and interactive exercises.

ALC (After-school learning Community): Extended day and extended year education programs for students (especially "at risk" students) from kindergarten to eighth grade.

Beacons: A program for after school activities in areas of academics and fitness run in conjunction with the local YMCA.

Yoga Calm: a program set up to help younger students use yoga techniques to create a calmer and more productive environment.

== Awards and honors ==
Target heart of America: The Target Corporation Volunteers School Library Makeover program. Volunteers help implement a plan to redesign and redecorate the library of public schools. Material and manpower are provided by Target Stores and Target employed designers and craftsmen.

Peace site: Students actively participate in events and in supplemental curriculum to promote peaceful interaction with other students and those in their communities.

Band Grant VH1: An annual fundraiser and promotional event for the school's band program.

== Athletics ==
Anne Sullivan participates in various programs to supplement the district's normal Physical Education requirements. In addition to the double gymnasium, there is a fitness center with aerobic and anaerobic machines and personal monitoring devices that track each student's progress.

The Middle School sports offered at Sullivan are girls' volleyball and softball, boys' and girls' basketball, boys' flag football and baseball. Anne Sullivan also Participates in the Beacon Minneapolis program to offer Soccer Club, Basketball Club, Squash Scholars, Swimming, Tennis and Technology and K-2 Yoga.
