= Tom Chorske =

American ice hockey player (born 1966)

- Born: September 18, 1966 (age 59) Minneapolis, Minnesota, U.S.
- Height: 6 ft 1 in (185 cm)
- Weight: 212 lb (96 kg; 15 st 2 lb)
- Position: Left wing
- Shot: Right
- Played for: Montreal Canadiens; New Jersey Devils; Ottawa Senators; New York Islanders; Washington Capitals; Calgary Flames; Pittsburgh Penguins
- National team: United States
- NHL draft: 16th overall, 1985; Montreal Canadiens
- Playing career: 1989–2001

Thomas Patrick Chorske (born September 18, 1966) is an American former professional ice hockey player. A forward, he played for eleven seasons in the National Hockey League (NHL). In September, 2006, he was named color commentator for New Jersey Devils radio broadcasts, a position he only held for one season before resigning. He was replaced with former team color commentator Sherry Ross (who called games from 1992 to 1995). Chorske returned to Minnesota and now works in business and is hockey analyst for Fox Sports North covering The NHL Minnesota Wild and University of Minnesota Golden Gopher NCAA hockey games.

In 2020, he was named the general manager of the St. Cloud Blizzard in the North American Hockey League.

== Playing career ==
Following an outstanding high school hockey career at Minneapolis Southwest High School, Chorske was named Mr. Hockey as the state's most outstanding high school player 1985, the inaugural year for the award. Soon after, Tom was selected by the Montreal Canadiens 16th overall in the 1985 NHL entry draft.

After being drafted, Chorske played two seasons of NCAA hockey at the University of Minnesota followed by a year playing with the 1987–88 US National Team preparing for the Winter Olympics in Calgary. Unfortunately, Chorske was the last player cut from the team as they headed to Calgary for the Olympics. Tom returned to the University of Minnesota for the 1988–89 season and was instrumental in the team's success that year.

In 1989–90, Chorske played 14 games with the Montreal Canadiens, scoring three goals and an assist. After another season in Montreal, he joined the New Jersey Devils, playing 76 games in 1991–92, scoring 19 goals and 36 points. In 1993–94, he had his finest offensive year, scoring 21 goals and 41 points but it was the following season which was by far the most satisfying for Chorske, his teammates and fans of the Devils. After several years of being near the top of the NHL, the Devils finally put it all together in the spring of 1995, defeating the Detroit Red Wings in four straight games to claim the Stanley Cup.

In 1995–96, Chorske joined the Ottawa Senators where he played for two seasons and helped them make their first modern era playoff appearance in 1997. He then headed to New York to suit up for the Islanders where he scored 35 points, including 4 short-handed tallies. During the 1998–99 season, he was sent to the Washington Capitals but had abdominal surgery and was limited to 17 games before finally ending up in Calgary at the trade deadline. In 1999–2000, Chorske played 33 games with the Pittsburgh Penguins, his final stop in the NHL. In 2000–01, he appeared in 78 games for the Houston Aeros of the now defunct International Hockey League, scoring 27 goals and 52 points.

Chorske's NHL totals were 596 games, 115 goals, 122 assists, for 237 points. Overall, he played in 733 professional games before retiring. He also played on several Team USA World Championship teams, twice winning bronze medals.

== Personal life ==
Chorske played quarterback for Minneapolis Southwest High School football team in 1984 and 1985. He was named to his high school all-conference first team in 1984–85 and named the inaugural Mr Hockey in 1985 as Minnesota's top senior high school hockey player.

He competed in 1985 U.S. National Sports Festival in Baton Rouge, La. and played on first U.S. team to win a medal at World Junior Championships when he won bronze medal in 1986. He also competed in 1986 U.S. National Sports Festival in Houston.

In college, he tied for the University of Minnesota (WCHA) scoring title with 49 points and was All-WCHA First Team in 1988–89. He left the University of Minnesota after his junior year to pursue pro hockey career with the Montreal Canadiens. He was on the Montreal team that joined Minnesota to compete in the 1990 NHL Friendship Tour in Soviet Union.

During the 1994–95 NHL lockout, he played in Italy.

Chorske retired from hockey in 2002 and returned to University of Minnesota to complete his undergraduate degree. He was later hired as an analyst for Fox Sports North for the NHL Minnesota Wild and University of Minnesota Gopher's Hockey broadcasts in October 2010 until 2020. He also makes regular appearances on Twin Cities sports radio programs and the Minnesota State High School hockey tournament broadcasts.

== Awards and honors ==
Award	Year
All-WCHA First Team	1988–89
Stanley Cup champion	1994–95

== Career statistics ==
=== Regular season and playoffs ===
			Regular season					Playoffs
Season	Team	League	GP	G	A	Pts	PIM	GP	G	A	Pts	PIM
1982–83	Southwest High School	HS-MN	—	—	—	—	—	—	—	—	—	—
1983–84	Southwest High School	HS-MN	—	—	—	—	—	—	—	—	—	—
1984–85	Southwest High School	HS-MN	23	44	26	70	—	—	—	—	—	—
1985–86	University of Minnesota	WCHA	39	6	4	10	16	—	—	—	—	—
1986–87	University of Minnesota	WCHA	47	20	22	42	20	—	—	—	—	—
1987–88	United States National Team	Intl	36	9	16	25	24	—	—	—	—	—
1988–89	University of Minnesota	WCHA	37	25	24	49	28	—	—	—	—	—
1989–90	Sherbrooke Canadiens	AHL	59	22	24	46	54	12	4	4	8	8
1989–90	Montreal Canadiens	NHL	14	3	1	4	2	—	—	—	—	—
1990–91	Montreal Canadiens	NHL	57	9	11	20	32	—	—	—	—	—
1991–92	New Jersey Devils	NHL	76	19	17	36	32	7	0	3	3	4
1992–93	Utica Devils	AHL	6	1	4	5	2	—	—	—	—	—
1992–93	New Jersey Devils	NHL	50	7	12	19	25	1	0	0	0	0
1993–94	New Jersey Devils	NHL	76	21	20	41	32	20	4	3	7	0
1994–95	HC Devils Milano	ITA	7	11	5	16	6	—	—	—	—	—
1994–95	HC Devils Milano	ALP	4	6	7	13	2	—	—	—	—	—
1994–95	New Jersey Devils	NHL	42	10	8	18	16	17	1	5	6	4
1995–96	Ottawa Senators	NHL	72	15	14	29	21	—	—	—	—	—
1996–97	Ottawa Senators	NHL	68	18	8	26	16	5	0	1	1	2
1997–98	New York Islanders	NHL	82	12	23	35	39	—	—	—	—	—
1998–99	New York Islanders	NHL	2	0	1	1	2	—	—	—	—	—
1998–99	Washington Capitals	NHL	17	0	2	2	4	—	—	—	—	—
1998–99	Calgary Flames	NHL	7	0	0	0	2	—	—	—	—	—
1999–00	Pittsburgh Penguins	NHL	33	1	5	6	2	—	—	—	—	—
2000–01	Houston Aeros	IHL	78	27	25	52	36	7	3	2	5	4
NHL totals			596	115	122	237	225	50	5	12	17	10

=== International ===
Medal record

Representing United States

World Championships
Bronze medal – third place	1996 Austria	

World Junior Championships
Bronze medal – third place	1986 Canada	

Year	Team	Event	GP	G	A	Pts	PIM
1986	United States	WJC	7	1	0	1	2
1989	United States	WC	9	2	1	3	6
1996	United States	WC	8	1	2	3	16
1998	United States	WC	6	1	1	2	0
1999	United States	WC	6	1	1	2	4
Senior totals			29	5	5	10	26

Sporting positions
Preceded by José Charbonneau	Montreal Canadiens first-round draft pick 1985	Succeeded by Mark Pederson
