= Camden High School (Minneapolis) =

Public secondary school in Minneapolis, Minnesota

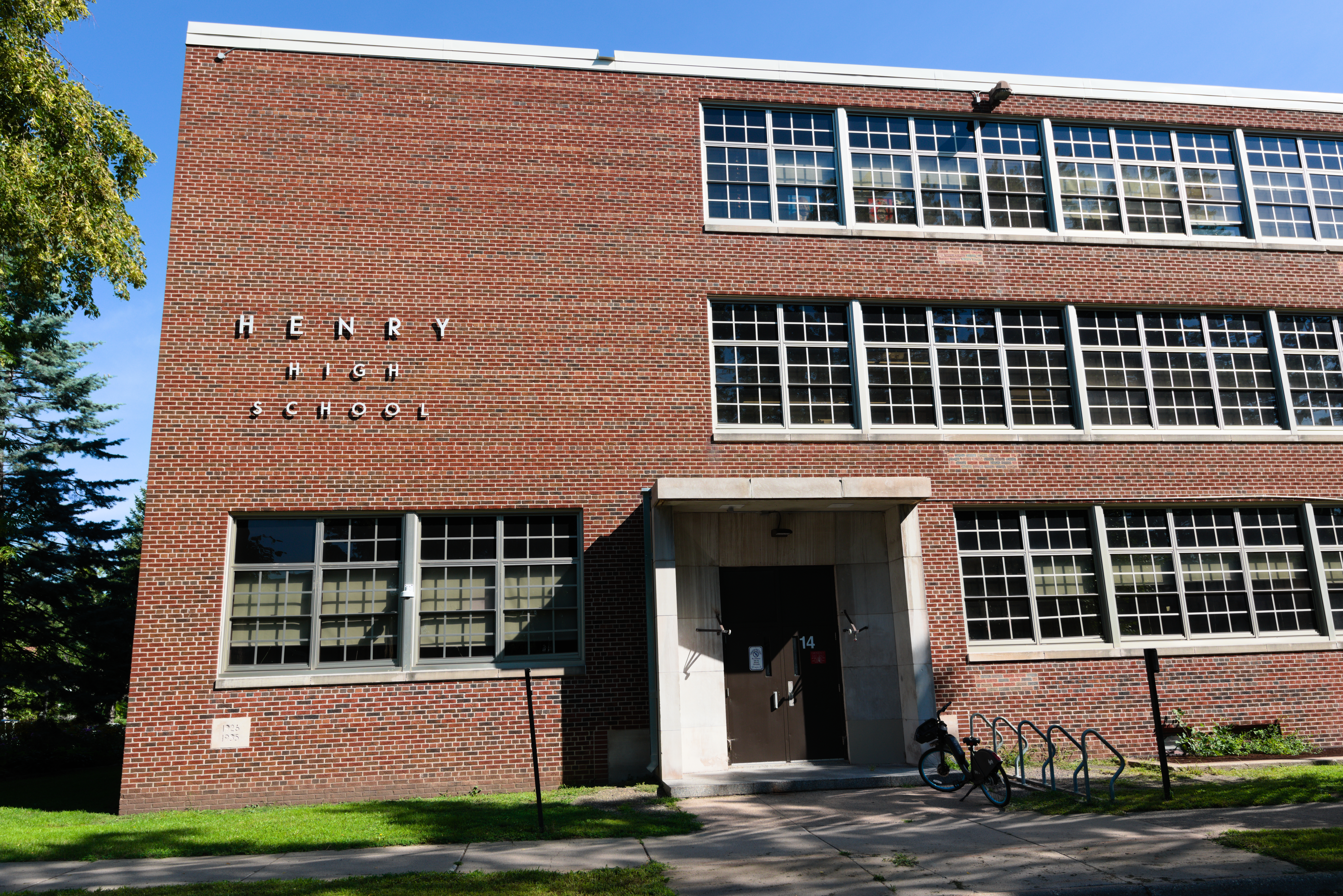

Location
- 4320 Newton Avenue North; Minneapolis, Minnesota; United States; 45°02′04″N 93°18′19″W

Information
- Type: Public secondary
- Established: 1937
- School district: Minneapolis Public Schools
- Principal: Liza Anderson
- Teaching staff: 77.05 (FTE)
- Grades: 9–12
- Enrollment: 783 (2024-2025)
- Student to teacher ratio: 10.16
- Campus: Urban
- Colors: Red and Grey
- Athletics: Minneapolis City Conference
- Mascot: Patriots
- Website: https://camden.mpschools.org/

Camden High School, formerly Patrick Henry High School, is a public secondary school in Minneapolis, Minnesota, United States. It is located in and named after the Camden neighborhood. It had a student population of about 1,000 by the early 2020s. In 2023, the school board approved renaming the building from Patrick Henry High School to Camden High School, effective July 1, 2024.

== History ==
=== Renovations ===
After renovations in the late 1990s moved the main entrance, the address of the school became 4320 Newton Avenue North.

=== Name change ===
In 2018, community members reexamined the legacy of naming the school for Patrick Henry, a slave owner and founding father. In the aftermath of the George Floyd protests in Minneapolis–Saint Paul in 2020, an advisory committee to the Minneapolis Public Schools unanimously approved a process with funding to rename the school during the 2022-23 school year. Camden High, to match the name of the neighborhood, was the public's preferred option and approved by the school board. The change was determined to take place for the 2024-25 school year and went into effect on July 1, 2024.

== Academics ==
Like all Minneapolis high schools, Camden comprises several "small learning communities" or SLCs. Its premier program is the International Baccalaureate program, which draws from parts of North, Northeast, Southeast, and some of South Minneapolis. The class of 2007 featured twenty IB Diploma candidates. Camden also has an engineering program and a liberal arts program. The school is IB Certified for the Diploma Programme (DP) and the Middle Years Programme (MYP).

U.S. News & World Report ranked Camden the 68th-best high school in Minnesota in 2022. Among schools with equivalent levels of poverty, Camden is one of very few in the country showing significant academic success.

For many years, Camden struggled with low enrollment and poor academic quality. But since the 1990s, it has benefited from the introduction of the IB program, corporate grants, a mentorship program for new teachers, and the leadership of former principals Cheryl Creecy, Michael Huerth (a recipient of the Milken Family Foundation's National Education Award), and Paul McMahan. A transition from being known as "Minneapolis Henry" to being called "Patrick Henry" occurred under McMahan as part of the school's renaissance.

Recent Camden graduates have been accepted and have matriculated to various prestigious colleges and universities, including the University of Minnesota, Harvard University, Tuskegee University, Carleton College, Purdue University, Dartmouth College, Emory University, and Brown University.

== Athletics ==
Camden's most notable sports team in recent years has been its boys' basketball team, which won four straight state championships in the AAA division under coach Larry McKenzie from 2000 to 2003. The team had some success before then as well, reaching the state final in 1998, and often defeating its rival North High School, led at the time by Khalid El-Amin. The basketball team previously won state championships in 1944 and 1945. The alpine skiing team won the state championship in 1941, and the boys' track and field team won the state championship in the AA division in 1990, led by "Leapin'" Leonard Jones.

Although the school had a thriving men's hockey team, the shift in demographics coincided with a decline in the interest in the sport. The sport was dropped at Camden. By 2010, both all hockey teams at all seven Minneapolis public high schools were merged into a collective Minneapolis boys team and girls team.

Beyond the sports, Camden has a vast array of other extracurriculars, the most notable of which being their math and robotics teams. Camden has one of the largest math teams in the city; coach John Heisel has managed to recruit a considerable number of students every year. Camden's robotics team, Herobotics, is known as one of the top teams in the state of Minnesota; they have won many awards, and advanced to the FIRST Championship seven times in their ten-year history.

== Notable alumni ==
- William Albert Allard, photographer, class of 1955
- Tony Andreason, musician with The Trashmen, class of 1962
- Rob Antony, General Manager and Executive Vice-President of Minnesota Twins, class of 1984
- Ed Flanders, actor in films and TV series St. Elsewhere
- Michael Hegstrand, best known as Road Warrior Hawk in World Wrestling Federation, class of 1976
- Tom Hirsch, hockey player
- Fue Lee, member of the Minnesota House of Representatives
- Jim McIntyre, former University of Minnesota basketball player
- Scott Norton, professional wrestler
- Ade Olufeko, technologist and entrepreneur
- Larry H. Smith, U.S. national hockey player
- Bee Vang, actor in Gran Torino (attended 9th grade at Camden, graduated from Roosevelt)
- Mike Ward, musician, founding member of the band The Wallflowers
- Toki Wright, regionally known rapper and educator
