= Alexander Kreiser =

United States Marine Corps general

- Commanding General 2nd Marine Aircraft Wing 1953
- Born: Alexander Walter Kreiser Jr; May 5, 1901; Minneapolis, Minnesota, U.S.
- Died: February 7, 1993 (aged 91); Palm Desert, California, U.S.
- Burial place: Riverside National Cemetery; 33° 52′ 39″ N, 117° 16′ 26″ W
- Military career
- Allegiance: United States of America
- Branch: United States Marine Corps
- Service years: 1924–1956
- Rank: Brigadier general
- Commands: MCAS El Toro; MCAS Cherry Point; MCAS Quantico, Va; VO-7M 2d Brig. NI
- Conflicts: Nanking Incident; Occupation of Nicaragua; World War II; Korean War
- Awards: Legion of Merit with Combat "V"; Bronze Star Medal with Combat "V" 2 Nicaraguan Medal of Merit with Diploma
- Website: last remaining Marine F7C-1 Seahawk

Alexander Walter Kreiser Jr (May 5, 1901 – February 7, 1993) was a Naval Aviator and a brigadier general who served in the United States Marine Corps.

Alexander Kreiser graduated from United States Naval Academy with a Bachelor of Science 1920–1924, he excelled in the engineering club at West High School Minneapolis, Minnesota and was accepted by Marion Military Institute in 1919.

== Early Marine Corps career ==
He became a company officer of Smedley Butler's 3rd Brigade China Marines from 1927 to 1929 and a Quantico Aviation pioneer of Marine Fighting Squadron Nine (VF-9M). Kreiser's early Quantico Marine (VF-9M) squadrons performed in many National Air Races in the United States. He received the Yangtze Service Medal in China during the Nanking Incident in 1927 and the Nicaragua Medal of Merit for his service as a combat pilot during the second United States occupation of Nicaragua.

== Marine aviator — 1930s ==
By the mid 1930s, Alexander Kreiser was assigned to the U.S. Navy's Bureau of Aeronautics as a captain and served as assistant command of the director of Marine Corps Aviation Ross E. Rowell before being assigned, to the Naval Air Station North Island at Coronado, California, in June 1939.

== World War II; 1940s ==
During World War II, Kreiser was a pilot in the 1st Marine Aircraft Wing and he earned a second Bronze Star Medal in the Solomon Islands campaign.

== 1950s — Commands, Assistant Commandant ==
Colonel Alexander W. Kreiser Jr was second in Command of the 1st Marine Aircraft Wing. BGen Clayton C. Jerome took over command of the wing in April 1952 from Major General MGen Christian F. Schilt while Col. A.W. Kreiser relieved BGen Frank Lamson-Scribner as assistant commanding general of the 1st Marine Aircraft Wing. in August 1952
