= North Community High School =

High school in Minneapolis, Minnesota

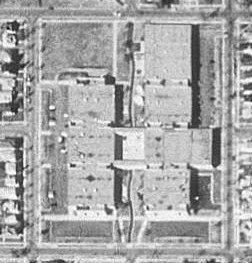
- North from the air, 1991

Location
- 1500 James Ave North; Minneapolis, Minnesota 55411; United States; 44°59′39″N 93°18′03″W

Information
- Type: Public
- Established: 1888; 138 years ago
- School district: Minneapolis Public Schools
- Principal: Mauri Melander Friestleben
- Teaching staff: 45.78 (FTE)
- Grades: 9–12
- Enrollment: 509 (2023–2024)
- Student to teacher ratio: 11.12
- Campus: Urban
- Colors: Royal Blue and White
- Athletics: Minneapolis City Conference
- Nickname: Polars
- Rival: Camden Patriots
- Newspaper: Polaris
- Yearbook: Polaris
- Website: http://north.mpls.k12.mn.us/

North Community High School, also called North High School, is a four-year public comprehensive high school located in Minneapolis, Minnesota, United States. The school has existed for over 120 years in several buildings all located on the city's north side. Minneapolis North once had a predominantly Jewish student body but by 1982, the school and the neighborhood it is located in had become mostly African American. Desegregation efforts, such as magnet school programs, have attempted to attract students from throughout Minneapolis and nearby suburbs. KBEM-FM, established by Minneapolis Public Schools in 1970, is operated partially by North students and has been located at the school since 1985.

== History ==
North has occupied four buildings. The first housed three grades when North opened in 1888. Three years later the first class graduated. The school outgrew the building and a new facility was built at a new site, opening in 1896. On June 18, 1913, a fire burned down most of the school. A new building was built over the destroyed structure and was completed in 1914. Additions were made in 1921, 1923, and 1939.

In 1963 it was determined that if the building was "to be retained as a secondary educational facility over a long period of time by the Minneapolis Public School system, it needs extensive rehabilitation and modernization to meet present day health, safety and educational adequacy.". Instead of improving the building, a new school was built on a new site and funded as part of a 1964 $18 million bond referendum that also funded improvements to other Minneapolis public schools. The new—and current—North opened in 1973. The building was described as "resembling a giant bunker with few windows, double doors that are often locked from outside during the day to keep out unwanted visitors and painted-over graffiti on outside walls." Another description calls it a "series of brick boxes arranged around a courtyard" that "doesn't allow it to connect well with the community". North used to house adult education classes, a school for teenage mothers and a separate charter school, Dunwoody Academy. All of these programs have relocated to other buildings.

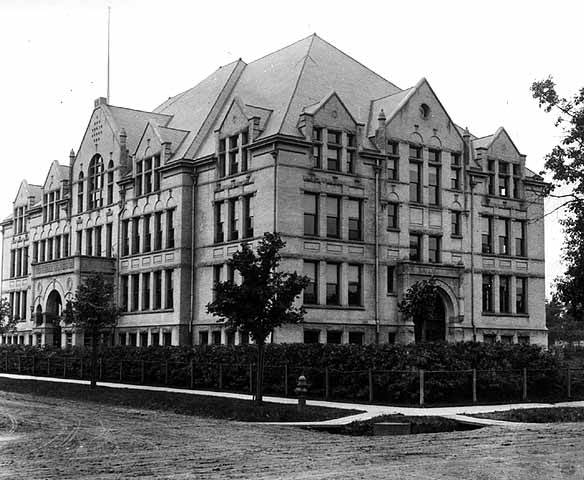
The second building (1896–1913) to house North

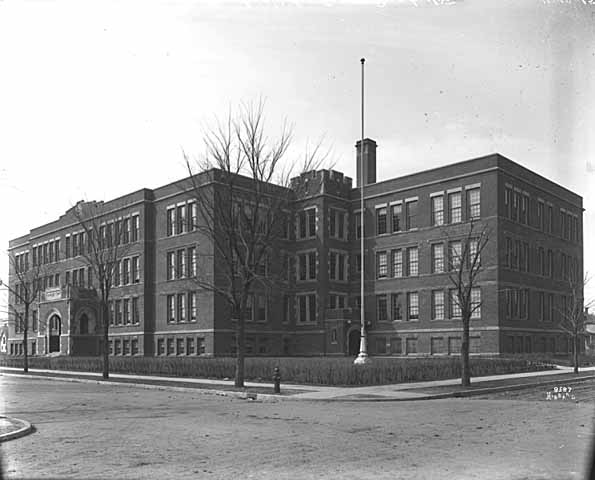
The third building (1914–1973) which was built over the previous structure.

As the North Side neighborhood has changed, so has North High. During the 1920s and 1930s, the North Side was the center of Minneapolis' Jewish population. In 1936, almost half of the students were Jewish.

The North Side has since transitioned into a diverse working-class neighborhood. North at one time had high enrollment and was overcrowded with more than 2800 students attending in 1931. Now, students are able to choose which schools they attend, and as a result only about half of the North Side's students attend local schools such as North. The Minneapolis Public Schools Board of Education's decision to close several North Side middle and elementary schools in the early 2000s led to North's enrollment plummeting from 1,143 students in 2004–2005 to 265 students in 2010. On October 11, 2010, Minneapolis Public Schools Superintendent Bernadeia Johnson recommended to the Board of Education the phasing out of North High Community High School beginning in the 2011–2012 school year. However, this decision resulted in backlash from the North Minneapolis community. It was decided that North Community High School would remain open, but change its curriculum standards to focus more on arts and communications. It is now called North Academy of Arts and Communications (NAAC).

Since the 1970s, the school has been known for its strong boys and girls basketball programs. Both teams have enjoyed numerous state tournament appearances and won state championship titles. North offers several college preparatory classes, and owns and operates KBEM-FM. The school has often struggled with graduation rate and state standardized tests.

== Students and demographics ==
964 students attended North during the 2006–2007 school year. Minority enrollment rose to over 60% in 1991. In 2010, 3% of students were white, with 69% black. 82% qualified for free or reduced price lunch (an indicator of poverty), 16% had limited English proficiency, and 22% qualified for special education.

== Academics ==
During the 2012–2013 school year and with its inaugural class of freshman, North Academy of Arts and Communication (NAAC), began as a small college preparatory school.

North's framework is based on the Seven Guiding Principles of the Institute for Student Achievement (ISA):

1. College Preparatory Instructional Program
2. Dedicated Team of Teachers and Counselor
3. Distributed Counseling
4. Continuous Professional Development
5. Extended School Day and School Year
6. Family Involvement
7. Continuous Organizational Improvement

The school has an Advanced Placement program that offers several different courses.

North is opened a second academy in the fall of 2016—N-STEM (North Academy of Science, Technology, Engineering and Math)—which is an iteration of the school's successful Summatech program that closed in 2007.

Local politician Don Samuels criticized North's low academic results in the 2000s after apologizing for a statement that the school should be burned.

== Radio station ==
North High School is home to KBEM-FM, a radio station owned by the Minneapolis Public Schools. The station signed on the air in October, 1970, and moved to North in 1983 when the Minneapolis Area Vocational Technical Institute, where the station had been located from its launch (as Vocational High School), closed and the building sold. Students are responsible for much of the station's operation, and 35 hours of airtime a week is devoted to student programming. Approximately 150 students are involved in the radio station's operation, with the majority attending North. Students typically enroll in the program as ninth-graders and are prepared for on-air duties by their junior or senior year.

The station broadcasts traffic reports for the Minneapolis-Saint Paul metro area with data provided by the Minnesota Department of Transportation. From 1989 to 2005, the station was paid approximately $400,000 by the DOT for this service. MnDOT had planned to cancel the contract, but due to public demand the state continued the relationship.

== Extracurricular activities ==
North offers a variety of musical programs. A beginning band, concert band, Jazz ensemble and drum line are offered. Choir, varsity choir, vocal ensembles and a gospel choir are available. Other extracurricular activities include a variety of academic competitions, a chess club, culture-specific clubs including an award-winning Asian Club, debate and mock trial teams, a school newspaper and yearbook, science club and student government. North's Math team competes in the Minnesota State High School Mathematics League. The school has a chapter of National Honor Society.

=== Sports ===
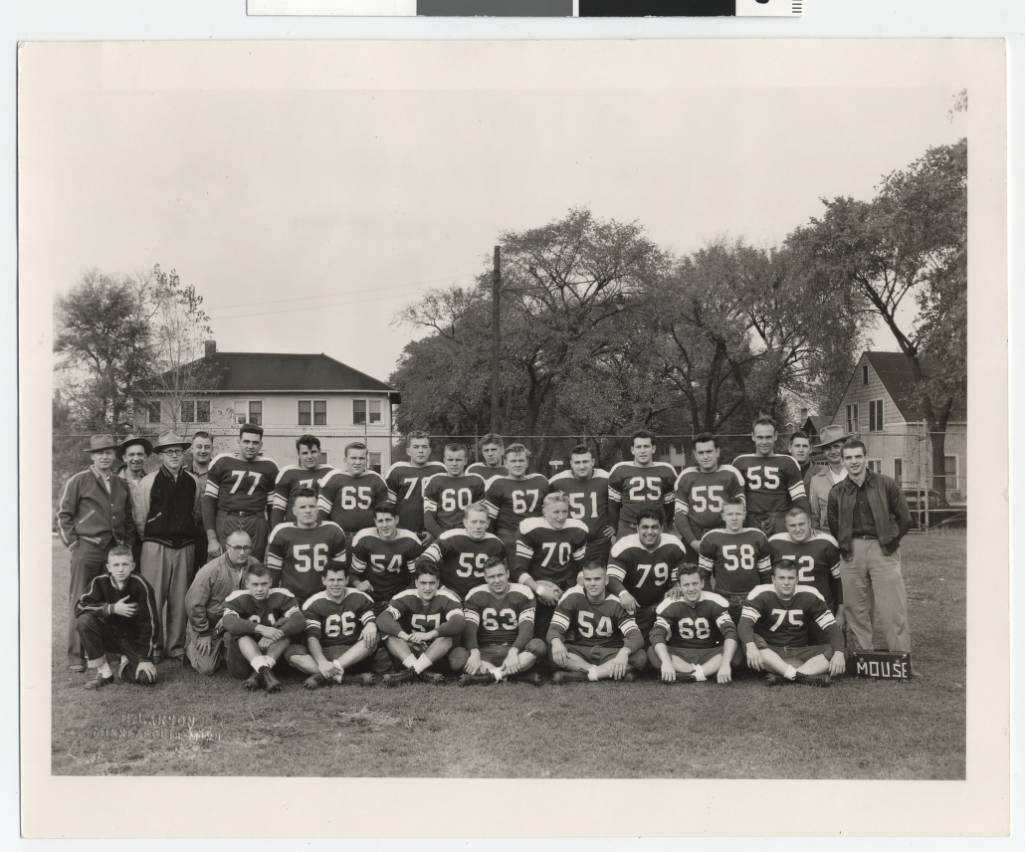
North Side High School varsity football team, 1949

North is a member of the Minnesota State High School League. North offers eleven boys' and twelve girls' varsity sports. These include football (boys), wrestling (boys), tennis (boys and girls), basketball (boys and girls), baseball (boys), softball (girls), golf (boys and girls), soccer (boys and girls), volleyball (girls), swimming (boys and girls), gymnastics (girls), badminton (girls), ice hockey (boys and girls), cross country (boys and girls) and track and field (boys and girls). North has Adapted Bowling. Both boys' and girls' teams are called "Polars". All of the sports teams participate, like all public high schools in Minneapolis, in the Minneapolis City Conference. North has won the state title in Boys' Track and Field in 1943 and 1948.

The boys' basketball team was dominant in the 1980s. Coached by Tony Queen, the team won eight of ten Minneapolis City Conference championships and went to the state tournament eight times, winning in 1980 and placing second in 1984 and 1985. In 1988 Queen was suspended from coaching for one year following attempts to recruit basketball players, which is illegal under Minnesota State High School League rules. He lost a battle to be rehired in U.S. District court. Queen was fired in 1990 for having sex with a student in the early 1980s. In the mid-1990s the boys' team had a dominating resurgence. Led by Khalid El-Amin, North tied a state record with three state championships in a row, from 1995 to 1997. The boys' teams have also won championships in 2003, 2016, and 2017.

The girls' team went to the state title game every year except for one from 1997 to 2005. They won in 1998, 1999, and had three straight wins in 2003, 2004 and 2005.

== Notable alumni ==
- The Andrews Sisters (1930s), singing group
- Tom Barnard (1969), broadcaster
- Billy Beal (1898), engineer and photographer
- Omar Brown (2019), NFL football safety
- Bob Bjorklund, American football player
- Ben Coleman (1970s), NBA player
- W. Harry Davis (1942), civil rights activist, amateur boxing coach, civic leader and businessman
- George C. Dahlvang (1935), Minnesota state representative
- Farrell Dobbs (1925), Trotskyist and trade unionist
- Khalid El-Amin (1997), NBA player
- William Gallagher (1894), former U.S. Representative from Minnesota's 3rd congressional district
- Sid Gillman (1930), professional football player and coach
- Sid Hartman (1939), sports journalist and broadcaster
- Bobby Jamison-Travis (2020), American football player
- Tyler Johnson (2016), American football player
- Terry Lewis, Morris Day and other members of Flyte Tyme/The Time, musicians
- Stan Kowalski (born Bert Smith), professional wrestler
- Peter Macon (1990s?), actor (The Orville)
- Tamara Moore (1998), WNBA player
- Gerald T. Mullin (1919), Minnesota state legislator, businessman, and lawyer
- Floyd B. Olson (1909), 22nd Governor of Minnesota
- Dave Peterson, teacher and coach of the United States men's national ice hockey team
- Wayne Robinson (1948?), NFL football player Philadelphia Eagles (1952–1956) professional football coach (1957–1976)
- Rafael Rodriguez (1964), professional welter weight boxer of Minnesota (1970's) Inducted in Minnesota's boxing Hall Of Fame (2010)
- Harrison Salisbury (1908), journalist
- Irving S. Shapiro (1924?), former chairman and CEO of DuPont
- Cyril A. Stebbins (1898), agricultural educator
- Robert Vaughn (1950?), actor
- Rohene Ward (2001), Olympic figure skating coach and choreographer. Former US figure skating competitor and Puerto Rico's 2004 champion
- Roy Wier (1906?), former U.S. Representative from Minnesota's 3rd congressional district

== In popular media ==
The four-part Showtime docuseries "Boys in Blue" that debuted in 2023 followed the challenges faced by the North football team in the aftermath of protests over the murder of George Floyd. The series included the fatal shooting of North student-athlete Deshaun Hill Jr. in 2022.
