= Minneapolis Public Schools =

School district in Minnesota, United States

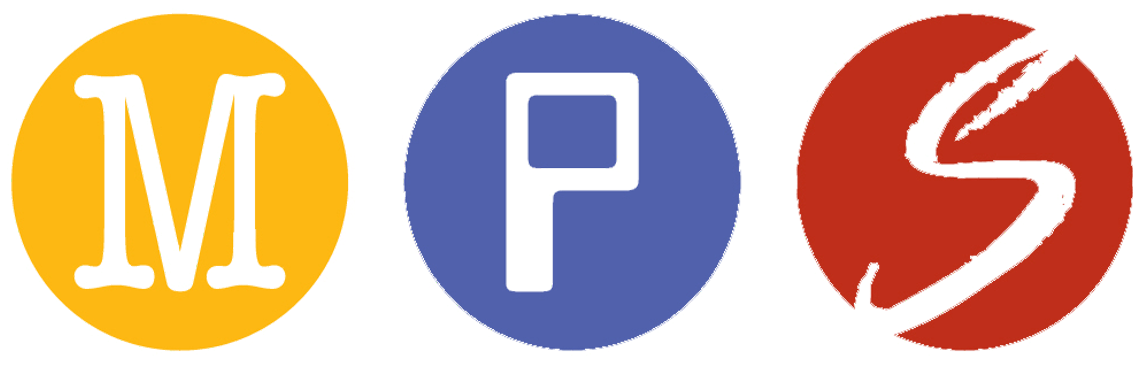
- The logo of the Minneapolis Public School District.

- Map of Minneapolis

Location
- Minneapolis Minnesota United States
- Coordinates: 44°59′58″N 93°17′48″W

District information
- Type: Public
- Grades: K-12
- Established: 1878
- Superintendent: Dr. Lisa Sayles-Adams
- Budget: $654,453,751

Students and staff
- Students: 29,786
- Teachers: 2375 (2005)
- Staff: 3122
- Athletic conference: Minneapolis City Conference

Other information
- Notes: 2010–2011 Fact Sheet
- Website: www.mpschools.org

Minneapolis Public Schools (MPS) or Special School District Number 1 is a public school district serving students in pre-kindergarten through twelfth grade from Minneapolis, Minnesota, United States. Minneapolis Public Schools enrolls 36,370 students in public primary and secondary schools. The district administers about one hundred public schools including forty-five elementary schools, seven middle schools, seven high schools, eight special education schools, eight alternative schools, nineteen contract alternative schools, and five charter schools. With authority granted by the state legislature, the school board makes policy, selects the superintendent, and oversees the district's budget, curriculum, personnel, and facilities. Students speak ninety different languages at home and most school communications are printed in English, Hmong, Spanish, and Somali.

== Enrollment ==
In the past decade enrollment in Minneapolis Public Schools has decreased significantly. In the 2001–2002 school year the district's enrollment was 46,256 students. In the 2002–2003 school year Minneapolis Public School's 46,037 students were enough to be the 98th largest school district in the United States in terms of enrollment. In the following school year (2003–2004) alone, the district's enrollment had decreased 5% to just over 43,000 students. At that time the district was predicted to lose 10,000 more students over the next five years if the then-current trend continued. Some of the decline has been the result of a smaller school-age population.

In the 2007–2008 school year, 10,000 eligible school children in Minneapolis choose to attend other schools such as ones in suburban school districts, private schools, or charter schools. The number of students enrolled in Minneapolis Public Schools is expected to drop under 30,000 students from 2007 to 2011. As a result of "a severe learning gap, continued enrollment decreases and financial shortfalls" the district has at times proposed closing a number of schools, the majority in North Minneapolis. The district has space for 50,000 students.

A large portion of students that would normally attend schools in Minneapolis instead attend schools in the western suburbs. In 2000, the Minneapolis branch of the NAACP sued alleging that students were being denied an adequate education. As a result, a program called "The Choice is Yours" was created that gave low-income students support in attending suburban schools. Around 2,000 students, the majority being from North Minneapolis, do so, attending other school districts in the West Metro Education Program. Several studies have revealed that students who remain in Minneapolis Public Schools have better test scores than those that are bused to schools in the suburbs.

=== Demographic profile of students ===
==== Race ====
Racial/ethnicity breakdown of enrolled students, 1985-2020
| Race/ethnicity | 1985 | 1990 | 1995 | 2000 | 2005 | 2010 | 2015 | 2020 | 2023 |
|---|---|---|---|---|---|---|---|---|---|
| White | 60.0% | 47.8% | 36.3% | 26.9% | 27.9% | 31.9% | 33.7% | 38.0% | 42.1% |
| Black | 25.0% | 32.4% | 40.4% | 44.7% | 41.8% | 37.1% | 37.7% | 36.0% | 32.9% |
| Hispanic | 1.5% | 2.1% | 4.4% | 9.2% | 15.4% | 18.1% | 18.5% | 16.8% | 14.5% |
| Asian | 5.9% | 10.2% | 12.4% | 14.8% | 10.7% | 8.2% | 6.4% | 5.5% | 5.5% |
| Native | 6.6% | 7.8% | 6.5% | 4.5% | 4.2% | 4.8% | 3.7% | 3.5% | 4.6% |

==== Languages ====
Primary home language, 2012-2021
| Language | 2012 | | 2015 | | 2018 | | 2021 | |
| Language | Students | % | Students | % | Students | % | Students | % |
|---|---|---|---|---|---|---|---|---|
| English | 23,534 | 68.44% | 24,465 | 68.89% | 23,960 | 68.89% | 21,317 | 72.27% |
| Spanish | 5,707 | 16.60% | 5,435 | 15.19% | 4,831 | 13.89% | 4,110 | 13.93% |
| Somali | 2,535 | 7.37% | 3,620 | 10.12% | 4,144 | 11.91% | 2,660 | 9.02% |
| Hmong | 1,401 | 4.07% | 1,059 | 2.96% | 752 | 2.16% | 507 | 1.72% |
| Other Afroasiatic | 168 | 0.49% | 223 | 0.62% | 445 | 1.28% | 339 | 1.15% |
| Other Indo-European | 152 | 0.44% | 174 | 0.49% | 154 | 0.44% | 162 | 0.55% |
| Vietnamese | 82 | 0.24% | 81 | 0.23% | 66 | 0.19% | 49 | 0.17% |
| Other language | 808 | 2.35% | 725 | 2.03% | 429 | 1.23% | 352 | 1.19% |

== Graduation rates and outcomes ==
The following table displays graduation rates in Minneapolis Public School District and Minnesota as a whole since 2021:

Graduation rate, 2021-2025, % graduated
| | 2021 | 2022 | 2023 | 2024 | 2025 |
|---|---|---|---|---|---|
| Minneapolis Public Schools | 73.7 | 76.7 | 67.8 | 73.8 | 72.8 |
| Minnesota Statewide | 83.3 | 83.6 | 83.3 | 84.2 | 84.9 |

On other measures, Minneapolis Public Schools generally has slightly to significantly lower outcomes than the state as a whole, as demonstrated by the following table:

Various educational measures, 2024 or 2025
| | Minneapolis | Minnesota |
|---|---|---|
| % Proficient in reading, 2025 | 40.8 | 49.6 |
| % Proficient in math, 2025 | 35.8 | 45.2 |
| % Proficient in science, 2025 | 22.9 | 26.2 |
| % Consistent (>90%) attendance, 2024 | 64.1 | 75.5 |
| % College-going within 16 months, 2024 | 63 | 64 |

== Changing school options (2009) ==
Partly in a response to an assessment performed by a consulting company (McKinsey & Co.) and a reduction in future budgets, the Minneapolis Schools embarked on a program to reorganize the community and magnet school organization.

The Minneapolis Board of Education at its September 22 meeting voted to amend and approve the recommendation for Changing School Options, a comprehensive plan to create financial sustainability for the Minneapolis Public Schools. The final vote was unanimous in favor of the recommendation.

Changing School Options creates three regional zones for transportation. With the exception of a few citywide options, students will attend an elementary, middle and high school in their zone. This three zone transportation model reduces transportation costs, retains choice for families since each zone offers at least three magnet options in addition to a community school and allows students to attend schools closer to home.

Each zone will offer K–8 students access to the following magnet programs: International Baccalaureate (IB); Teaching philosophy: Open or Montessori; Spanish Dual Immersion; Curricular: Arts and Science. Each zone will offer 9–12 students access to comprehensive high school programming.

Families with children enrolled in a citywide special education or English Language Learner program will continue to receive transportation across zones. Based on the state's open enrollment law, families still have the option to enroll at any school in the city provided there is space available and they provide their own transportation. Students currently attending magnet, middle or high schools outside of their home attendance area or zone will have the option of grandfathering, or being guaranteed a seat in their current school, but must provide their own transportation. Students attending a community school who live outside of their school's attendance area will be able to continue to attend if space is available, but must provide transportation.

The plan closes six buildings – four schools and two administrative centers that also house alternative programs – at the end of the 2009–10 school year: 1250 West Broadway; Longfellow; Folwell; the Lehmann Center; Emerson, which would move to the Anwatin/Bryn Mawr site; and the Brown Building, which housed Anishinabe Academy. Anishinabe has already moved to Sullivan for this school year. The Anwatin Middle School program will be phased out over the next two years; students who are in sixth and seventh grade at Anwatin may continue at the school through their eighth grade year.

The K–5 portion of Emerson Spanish Dual Immersion School will move intact to the Bryn Mawr/Anwatin site, with existing transportation services for those outside of the walk zone. A new combined Dual Spanish Immersion–International Baccalaureate middle school program will be created at the Bryn Mawr/Anwatin site to serve Emerson, Windom and community sixth through eighth graders from the Bryn Mawr and Bethune attendance areas. This program would also serve students remaining in the Anwatin program through their eighth grade year.

The number of magnet schools will be reduced from 16 to 12 in order to concentrate resources on fewer magnets to strengthen their programs. Schools that are no longer magnets may choose to retain their themes. Current magnet schools that will no longer have magnet status are Cityview and Kenwood Performing Arts, Northrop Environmental and Pillsbury Math, Science and Technology. The Park View Montessori program will close. Armatage Community and Montessori School will become a full Montessori magnet school, with the community school program closing at the end of the 2009–10 school year. Bancroft Community School will become an International Baccalaureate magnet school.

Implementation of CSO for the 2010–2011 school year was modified from the plan as stated here. Among the changes: Anwatin Middle School remains open and now offers an International Baccalaureate program to all students, with about 25% of students also participating in a Spanish Dual Immersion program (established path from the K–5 Spanish Dual Immersion feeder programs at Emerson and Windom). Emerson remains at their unique location near downtown Minneapolis and beautiful Loring Park, and has expanded to offer Hi–5 classes.

== Leadership ==
The Minneapolis Board of Education, also referred to as the School Board, is the board of education for Minneapolis Public Schools. It describes itself as "a policy-making body responsible for selecting the superintendent and overseeing the district's budget, curriculum, personnel and facilities." The Minneapolis Board of Education has been granted the power to carry out such duties by the State of Minnesota and the Minnesota Legislature.

=== Current members ===
- Chair: Collin Beachy (member at-large)
- Vice-Chair: Kim Ellison (member at-large)
- Clerk: Lori Norvell (District 5)
- Treasurer: Abdul Abdi (District 1)
- Director: Sharon El-Amin (District 2)
- Director: Faheema Feerayarre (District 3)
- Director: Adriana Cerillo (District 4)
- Director: Ira Jourdain (District 6)
- Director: Joyner Emerick (member at-large)
- Student Representative: Leo Peralta
- Student Representative: Elliston Rounds

== Schools ==
Minneapolis Public Schools runs or contracts with the following schools serving pre-K through 12th grade:

=== Mixed-grade schools ===
- Ella Baker Global Studies and Humanities School (formerly Jefferson Community School)(Pre-K–8)
- MPS Online School (K-12)
- Sullivan STEAM School (Pre-K–8)

=== Pre-K schools ===
- Early Childhood Special Education
- Mona Moede Early Learning Center

=== Elementary schools (K–5) ===
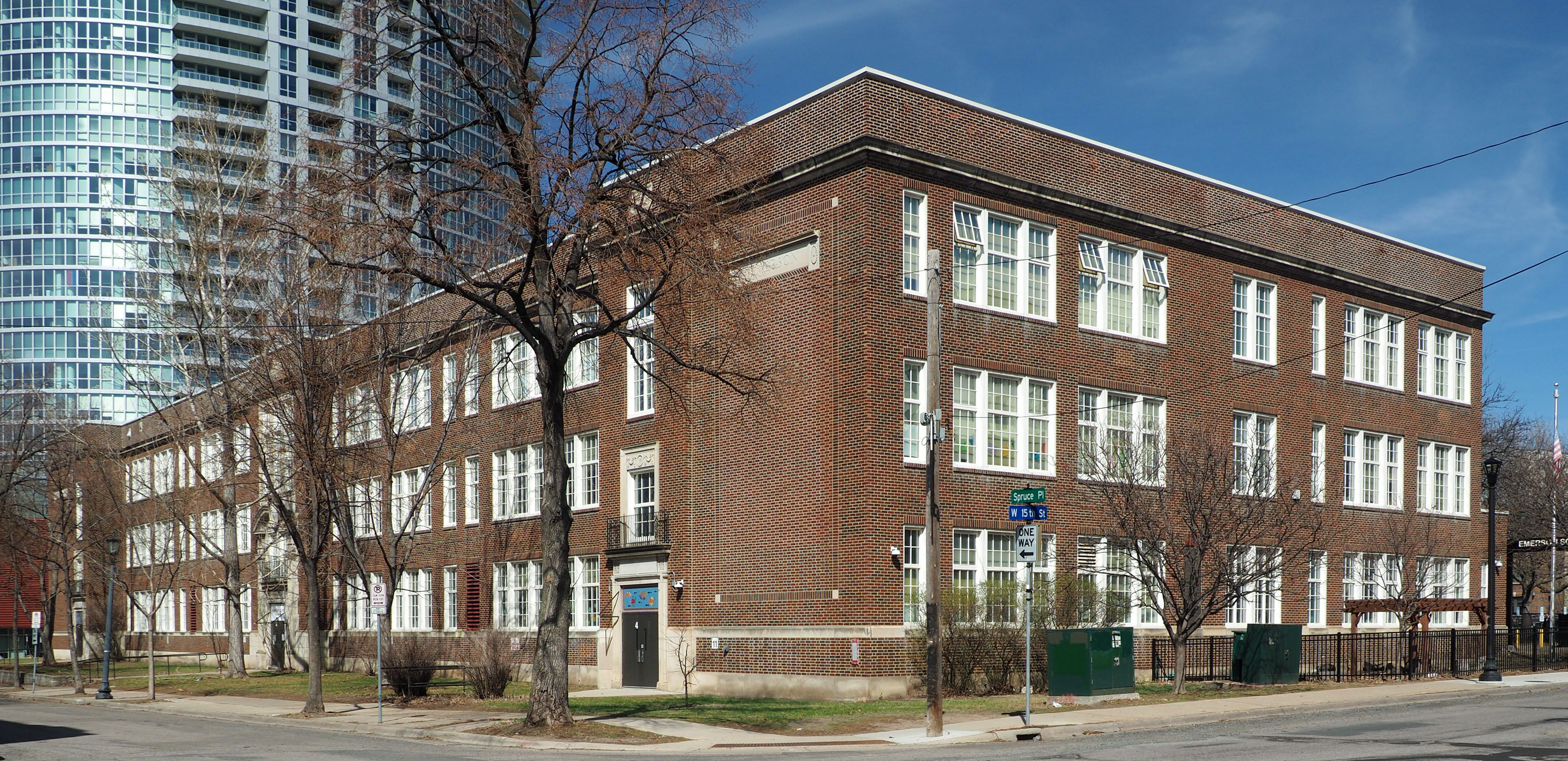
Emerson Dual Language School

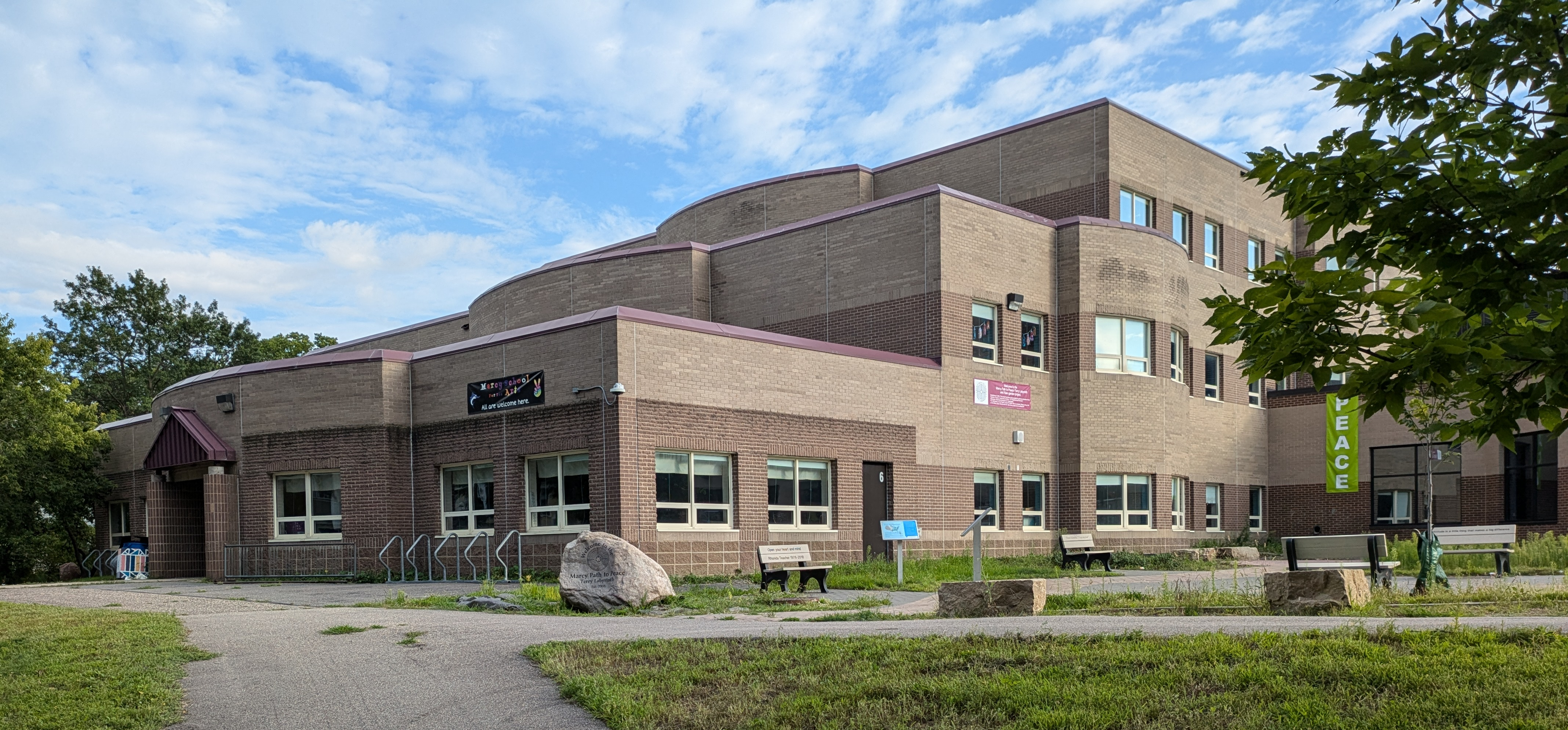
Marcy Arts Elementary School

- Anishinabe Academy†
- Armatage Elementary Community School
- Bancroft Community School†
- Barton Elementary School
- Bethune Arts Elementary School†
- Bryn Mawr Elementary School†
- Burroughs Elementary School
- Cityview Elementary School†
- Dowling Elementary School
- Emerson Dual Language Elementary School
- Field Elementary School (formerly Field Middle School) (3-5)
- Folwell Elementary School†
- Green Central Dual Language Elementary School†
- Hale Elementary School (K–2)
- Hall STEM Academy†
- Hiawatha Elementary School (K-2)
- Hmong International Academy†
- Howe Elementary School (3-5)
- Jenny Lind Elementary School†
- Kenny Elementary School
- Kenwood Elementary School
- Lake Harriet Lower Elementary School (K-2)
- Lake Harriet Upper Elementary School (3-5)
- Lake Nokomis Wenonah Elementary School (K-1)
- Lake Nokomis Keewaydin Elementary School (2-5)
- Las Estrellas Dual Language Elementary School†
- Loring Elementary School†
- Lucy Craft Laney at Cleveland Park Elementary School†
- Lyndale Elementary School†
- Marcy Arts Elementary School†
- Nellie Stone Johnson Elementary School†
- Northrop Elementary School
- Pillsbury Elementary School†
- Pratt Elementary School†
- Seward Montessori Elementary School†
- Waite Park Elementary School†
- Webster Elementary School†
- Whittier International Elementary School†
- Windom Elementary School

† indicates elementary schools also offering pre-K

=== Middle schools (6–8) ===
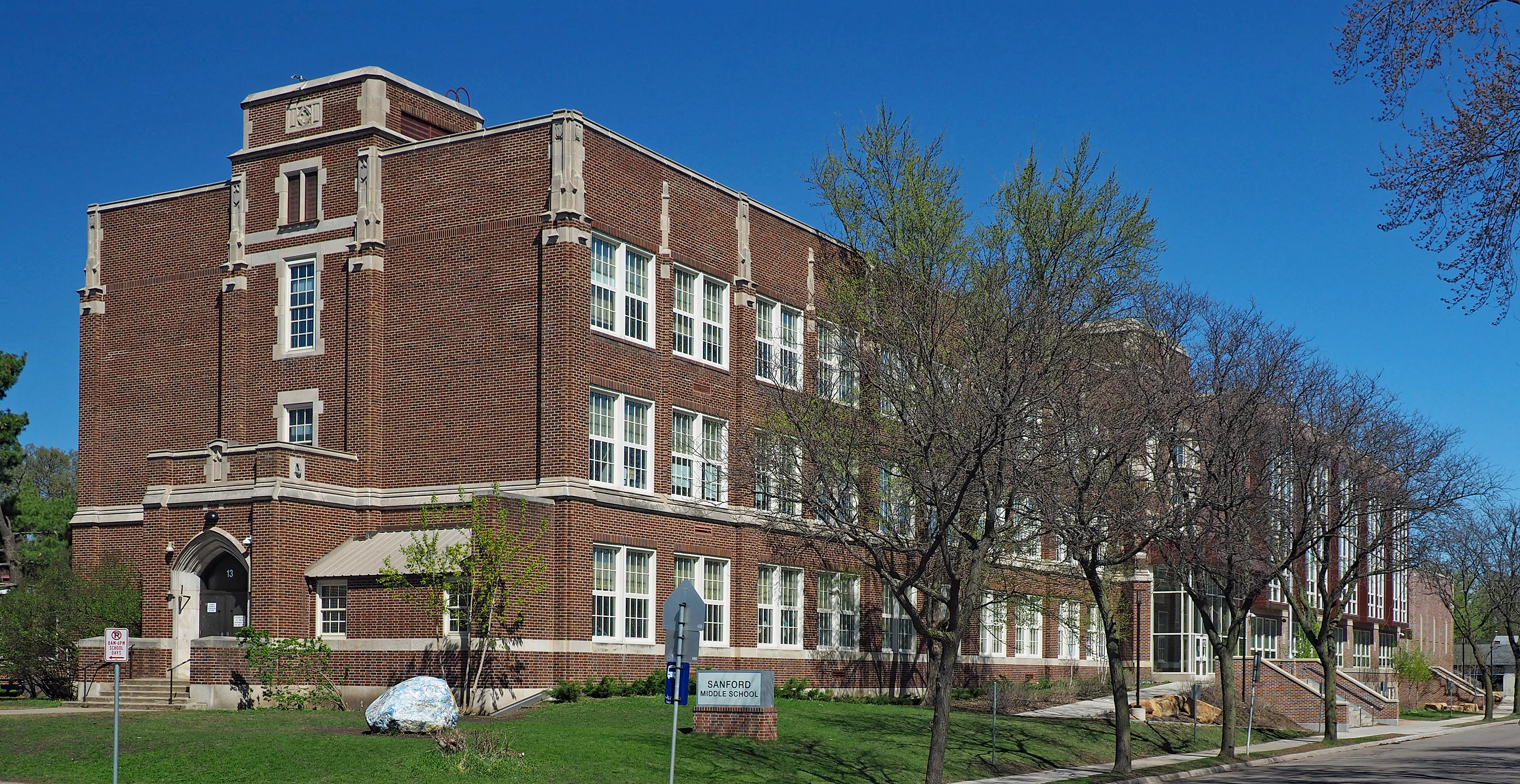
Sanford Middle School

- Andersen United Middle School
  - Andersen Spanish Dual Language
- Anthony Middle School
- Anwatin Middle School
- Franklin STEAM Middle School
- Justice Page Middle School (formerly Ramsey Middle School)
- Northeast Middle School
- Olson Middle School
- Sanford Middle School

=== High schools (9–12) ===
- Camden High School
- Edison High School
- FAIR School for Arts
- Heritage Academy
- North Community High School
- Roosevelt High School
  - Roosevelt Spanish Dual Language
- South High School
  - South All Nations
- Southwest High School
- Washburn High School
- Wellstone International High School

=== Alternative middle and high schools ===
Alternative schools are available for high school and middle school students on a choice basis. Many of these are operated through contracts with community organizations, but students of these schools continue to be MPS students.

- Harrison High School (9-12)
- Longfellow Alternative High School (9-12)
- Loring Nicollet Alternative Program (9-12)
  - a contract with Project for Pride in Living
- Minneapolis Academy and Career Center (MACC) (10-12)
- MENLO Park Academy Alternative Program (10-12)
  - a contract with East Side Neighborhood Services
- MERC Alternative Program (10-12)
  - a contract with Project for Pride in Living
- NaWAyEE Center School (7-12)
  - NaWAyEE is run by its own nonprofit.
- PYC Arts & Technology Alternative Program (9-12)
  - a contract with Plymouth Christian Youth Center, PCYC
- Takoda Prep Alternative Program (9-12)
  - a contract with Takoda, the career pathways division of American Indian OIC
- VOA High School Alternative Program (10-12)
  - a contract with Volunteers of America

== Selected history of Minneapolis schools ==
- 1834 Rev. J.D. Stevens opens the first school in Minneapolis on the shores of Lake Harriet with four pupils.
- 1849 The first private school opens in St. Anthony (which merged with Minneapolis in 1872).
- 1851–1852 Mary Schofield opens a school on the west side of the Mississippi River.
- 1857 Minneapolis' first school, Union School, opens. Located on East Side of 3rd Avenue between S. 4th and 5th Streets
- 1865 Union School burns to the ground.
- 1866 Washington School built on Union School site. High School occupies Third Floor. Demolished in 1888.
- 1867 East Side (East) High School opens.
- 1877 Central High School opens at 11th Street & 4th Avenue South.
- 1878 The State Legislature merges St. Anthony and Minneapolis School Boards into Minneapolis Board of Education.
- 1888 Second Washington School (much larger) built on new site. Located on South Side of 6th Street between Park and Chicago Avenues
- 1888 Logan High School opens.
- 1892 South Side High School opens.
- 1896 North Side High School opens.
- 1898 Sidney Pratt Elementary School opens.
- 1908 University High School opens on campus of University of Minnesota as a preparatory lab for the School of Education
- 1909 West High School opens.
- 1913 Central High School relocates to newly constructed building on 4th Avenue at 34th Street.
- 1916 Miller Vocational High School opens.
- 1922 Thomas Alva Edison High School opens
- 1922 Theodore Roosevelt High School opens.
- 1924 East Side High School closed. Part of building converted to commercial use. Demolished 2005.
- 1924 Marshall High School opens.
- 1925 Washburn High School opens.
- 1940 Patrick Henry Junior High School becomes Patrick Henry High School.
- 1940 Southwest High School opens.
- 1940 Minneapolis Board of Education drops the word "Side" from the title of the all Minneapolis High Schools.
- 1942 Logan High School closed.
- 1967 Marshall & University High Schools merge into Marshall-University High School.
- 1976 Miller Vocational High closed. Continued as Minneapolis Area Vocational Technical Institute. Closed 1984. Converted to commercial offices.
- 1982 Central High School closed. Building demolished.
- 1982 Marshall-University High School closed. Building converted to commercial offices. Demolished 2013.
- 1982 Sidney Pratt Elementary School closed.
- 1982 West High School closed. Building demolished.
- 2000 Sidney Pratt Elementary School reopens (original 1898 building).
- 2022 Jefferson School is renamed to Ella Baker Global Studies and Humanities and Sheridan is renamed to Las Estrellas Dual Language Elementary.
- 2024 Patrick Henry High School is renamed Camden High School.

== Records ==
Miscellaneous records such as newspaper clippings, minutes, reports, ledgers, promotional material and other items relating to the Minneapolis Public School district are available for research use. They include treasurer's ledgers and receipt book; summer school pupil record; teacher's term reports and list; annual reports of the secretary and committee on textbooks and course instruction; statistics on citywide and individual school failures and promotions and the cost of teaching high school; a real estate acquisition record; and a chart depicting the history of past and present school buildings and sites. They also include minutes of citywide principals' and assistant principals' meetings, and subject files. Slides, sound cassettes and script materials from Wilder Elementary depicting Laura Ingalls Wilder are also part of the collection.

== See also ==
- 1970 Minneapolis teachers' strike
- List of school districts in Minnesota
