= Southwest High School (Minnesota) =

High school in Minneapolis, Minnesota

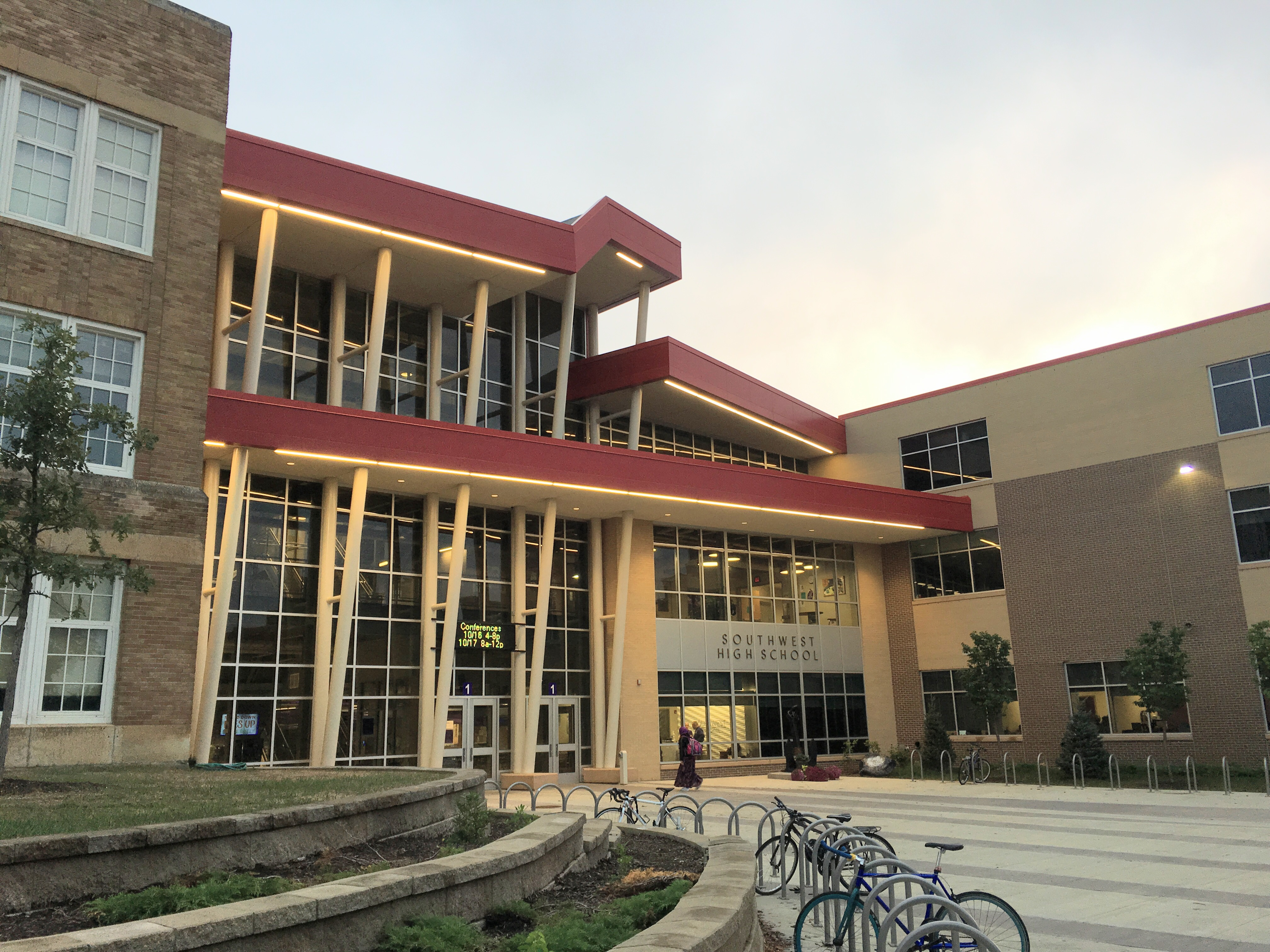
- Southwest in 2018

Location
- 3414 West 47th Street; Minneapolis, Minnesota 55410; United States; 44°55′06″N 93°19′29″W

Information
- Type: Public
- Motto: Inspiring Excellence in Arts and Academics
- Established: 1940
- School district: Minneapolis Public Schools
- Principal: Edward Bennett
- Teaching staff: 73.07 (on a FTE basis)
- Grades: 9–12
- Gender: Coeducational
- Enrollment: 1,310 (2023-2024)
- Student to teacher ratio: 17.93
- Hours in school day: 8:30 AM to 3:10 PM
- Campus: Urban
- Colors: Purple and White or Black
- Fight song: Southwest Victory
- Athletics conference: Minneapolis City Conference
- Nickname: Lakers
- Rival: Washburn High School
- National ranking: 4,830
- Newspaper: The Anchor
- Yearbook: The Aquarian
- Feeder schools: 4 elementary schools (Kenny, Lake Harriet Upper/Lower, Armatage, & Windom) feed into Anthony M.S. and then Southwest H.S.
- Website: southwest.mpschools.org

Southwest High School is a four-year comprehensive public high school in the Linden Hills neighborhood of Minneapolis, Minnesota, United States. It is one of 10 high schools in the Minneapolis Public Schools district. Southwest offers the International Baccalaureate Diploma Programme.

== History ==
Construction for Southwest High School began in 1938 and the building opened as a school in 1940, with the main entrance at Beard Avenue South and West 47th Street. The school drew 841 students from Minneapolis, Edina and Richfield its first year. Several additions were made to the original structure. The first—a second gymnasium and several new classrooms in an area later known as the "North" building—opened in 1956; additionally, Southwest became a 7-12 school that same year. The second was an entirely new building that became Southwest Junior High and was connected via a single hallway, opening in 1968; the new building containing another gymnasium, a new library, and a pool. With the new gymnasium in the "East" building, the gymnasium in the original structure was turned into a 700-seat auditorium.

With the reorganization of Minneapolis schools in 1982, Southwest returned to just grades 9–12, with seventh and eighth graders going to Anwatin and Anthony Middle Schools. Most of the students who attended West High School were transferred to Southwest when it was closed the same year.

In 1987, the International Baccalaureate Programme began at Southwest. Currently, all 9th and 10th grade students follow the IB Middle Years Programme curriculum.

Also in 1987, Southwest High School was one of the first high schools in the country to stop using a Native American for its mascot and nickname. Its student body voted to change the nickname of the school from the Indians to the Lakers.

In 1998–1999, the classrooms in the North building were enlarged to become science laboratories. This same renovation included more new classrooms, a new gymnasium floor, and bleachers.

In 2006, a new equipment and weightlifting area was designed in the vocational end of the North building. Over the next few years, the entire interior structure of the auditorium was removed starting with the concrete floor and ending with the new roof. The stage and part of the original gym floor, now the orchestra pit, are all that remain of the previous structure. A new audio-video control booth, catwalks, seating, and acoustic walls were added as well.

In 2016, the Minneapolis school board approved a $47+ million renovation that would add a new building and let the school have space for 450 new students. The expansion was completed for the 2016–17 school year and added 20 new classrooms. The 60,346-square-foot building was constructed between the original east (Southwest Junior High building) and west buildings. As a part of the renovation, 12,400 square feet of the east building was demolished. The main offices of the school were moved to the new structure, and a large part of the building was the 10,000-square-foot lunchroom. The renovation also included mechanical upgrades like air conditioning that classrooms had never had before.

=== 2018 walkout incident ===
On March 14, 2018, one month after the Marjory Stoneman Douglas High School shooting in Parkland, Florida, students at Southwest participated in a nationwide walkout to honor the victims of the shooting and protest gun violence. During the walkout, a student across the street from campus waved a "Trump" flag. Eight students confronted him, taking his flag and assaulting him. The student sustained minor injuries and a camera he was holding was damaged. Minneapolis Police said a school resource officer stopped the altercation.

== Demographics ==
The demographic breakdown of the 1,918 students enrolled in 2021-2022 was:

- Male – 51%
- Female – 49%
- Native American/Alaskan – 0.7%
- Asian/Pacific islanders – 3.7%
- Black – 26.7%
- Hispanic – 10.2%
- White – 56.2%
- Multiracial – 2.5%

33% of the students were eligible for free or reduced cost lunch. This is a Title I school.

== Notable alumni ==
- Chuck Aoki – Paralympic wheelchair rugby player
- Dorothy Benham – Miss America 1977
- Tom Chorske – professional ice hockey player
- Dessa Darling – hip hop artist, poet, writer
- Peter Graves – actor
- Dylan Keefe – bass guitarist of Marcy Playground
- Libby Larsen – Grammy Award-winning composer
- Greg Murtha – former NFL tackle
- Dave Peterson (1955–1984), business teacher, high school hockey coach, and coach of the United States men's national ice hockey team
- Ken Rizer – Iowa state representative
- Marion Ross – actress
- Matthew Santos – musician
- Palbasha Siddique – singer
- Matt Smaby – professional ice hockey player
- Jake Sullivan – National Security Advisor for President Joe Biden
- John Taft – professional ice hockey player
- Lizz Winstead – comedian, Daily Show co-creator
