= Minneapolis City Conference =

The Minneapolis City Conference is the Minnesota State High School League-sponsored high school sports league for schools in Minneapolis, Minnesota.

== Members ==
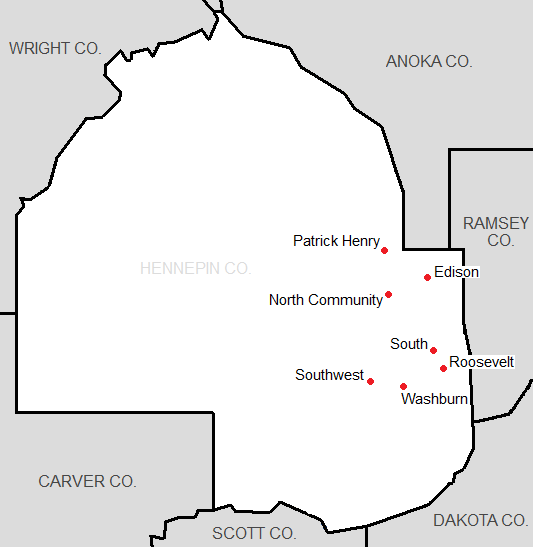
The members of the Minneapolis City Conference.

School	Nickname	Colors	Address
Edison High School	Tommies	Blue & Gold	700 22nd Ave. NE; Minneapolis, MN 55418
North Community High School	Polars	Royal Blue & White	1500 James Ave. N Minneapolis, MN 55411
Camden High School	Patriots	Red & Gray	4320 Newton Ave. N Minneapolis, MN 55412
Roosevelt High School	Teddies	Maroon & Gold	4029 28th Ave. S Minneapolis, MN 55406
South High School	Tigers	Black & Orange	3131 19th Ave. S Minneapolis, MN 55407
Southwest High School	Lakers	Purple & White	3414 W. 47th St. Minneapolis, MN 55410
Washburn High School	Millers	Blue & Orange	201 W. 49th St. Minneapolis, MN 55419
