= National Independent Venue Association =

American trade association

- Abbreviation: NIVA
- Formation: March 2020; 6 years ago
- Type: Trade association
- Headquarters: New York City, U.S.
- Executive Director: Stephen Parker
- Website: nivassoc.org

The National Independent Venue Association (NIVA) is an American trade association of independent music venues, promoters, and festivals. Based in New York City, it was founded in March 2020 to pursue federal support such as business recovery grants and tax relief in the wake of COVID-19's effect on the live entertainment industry. NIVA manages the website SaveOurStages.com and advocated for federal relief on social media using the hashtag #SaveOurStages. In years since, NIVA has shifted its focus to other areas of live entertainment advocacy and reform, including campaigning for more environmentally sustainable practices among member venues, and "Fix the Tix", a proposed congressional bill targeting the ticket resale market.

== Formation of NIVA ==
On March 12, 2020, 75 independent venues and stakeholders joined for a call organized by Independent Venue Week (IVW), to discuss COVID-19's disruption of the live entertainment industry. The call's purpose was for venues to share their experiences in different stages of the crisis. The call touched on legal ramifications, insurance questions, and governmental regulation. It was also discussed on the call whether independent business owners in the live industry can get access to the SBA loans or tax relief mentioned by Donald Trump in his address to the nation March 11. The call also included Stephen Sternschein, organizer of the "Banding Together" initiative in the wake of SXSW’s cancellation, as well as venue owners from the United Kingdom and United States.

The National Independent Venue Association (NIVA) was announced soon after to lobby for assistance from the U.S. federal government. In the first few days its membership grew to over 450 member venues and a week later it had expanded to 900, including the 9:30 Club in Washington, D.C., Hotel Cafe in Los Angeles, the Red River Cultural District in Austin and the Exit/In in Nashville. At the helm of NIVA is Rev. Moose, Managing Partner of Marauder (the branding and marketing firm who organizes IVW), as well as venue owner Dayna Frank of First Avenue in Minneapolis, and Gary Witt, Executive Director of Pabst Theater Group in Milwaukee. Dayna Frank told Billboard that many of the aid packages and loan assistance available do not work for concert promoters, who will face significant obstacles reopening their businesses. In November 2020, Frank was honored on Rolling Stone's Future 25, a "celebration of 25 leaders upending the music industry with brazen ideas."

Thanks to funding from See Tickets, Etix and Lyte, NIVA hired Washington, D.C. lobbying and international law firm Akin Gump in April 2020 to represent the organization's members and advocate for coronavirus-related assistance.

== Survey report ==
In May 2020, NIVA published a member survey of its nearly 2,000 member venues and promoters, claiming that 90 percent of independent venues may be forced to permanently close their doors in the next few months, owing to the fiscal strain of ongoing coronavirus lockdown measures. The report emphasized that live entertainment establishments are unable to draw revenue but must still find a way to cover bills, insurance costs, and other expenses. NIVA conducted the survey of its nearly 2,000 member venues and promoters, 90 percent of whom indicated that they will close permanently in a few months without federal funding. NIVA said the current Paycheck Protection Program funding will not solve the crisis. The organization stated that any plan to reopen venues with partial capacity "is not economically feasible…payroll, taxes, insurance, and artist pay are not on a sliding scale matching the capacity we’re permitted to host. They are fixed costs." Plus, owing to the national routing of contemporary tours, NIVA signaled that "our industry will not recover" until each state has fully reopened its economy, which is problematic given the differing approaches that governors are taking in directing their reopening initiatives. The report closed by describing the support that some members of Congress have offered the live event industry thus far, as well as possible ways of helping venues to weather the COVID-19 crisis's financial fallout.

On May 6, 2020, Rolling Stone published an article titled "Without Federal Aid, More than 1,000 U.S. Music Venues Are in Danger of Closing", bringing nationwide publicity and calling for immediate action. Dayna Frank told Rolling Stone that "90% of its member venues report they do not have cash on hand to last more than six months without federal intervention, and 55% say they do not have enough to last more than three months." Despite never having worked together before, the article explains, its member venues banded together to seek federal support such as tax relief and business recovery grants.

== Artist Letter to Congress ==
In June 2020, as a response to the growing crisis in the entertainment industry, over 600 major recording artists, including Dave Grohl, Neil Young, Billie Eilish, Lady Gaga, Robert Plant, Willie Nelson and John Mayer, signed a letter to Congress imploring legislators to financially support these institutions.

== Save Our Stages (SOS) Act ==
A bill from Senators Amy Klobuchar (D-MN) and John Cornyn (R-TX) seeks to provide Small Business Administration grants for independent live music venue operators affected by COVID-19 stay-at-home orders. Introduced July 22, the Save Our Stages Act (SOS Act) would provide six months of financial support to keep theaters and other venues afloat.

As of mid-June, one in three leisure and entertainment business locations were closed relative to prepandemic levels, and one in three employees in the industry were no longer working.

The Save Our Stages Act is endorsed by NIVA and the National Independent Talent Organization. The bill directs the Small Business Administration to make grants to eligible venues equal to the lesser of either 45% of operation costs from calendar year 2019 or $12 million. It would allow the SBA to issue supplemental grants in the future if funding remains available and applicants can demonstrate need, and permits recipients to use grants for costs incurred during the pandemic. The legislation requires recipients to return remaining funding after one year from the date of disbursement. Its introduction follows that in late May of the RESTART Act by Senators Michael Bennet (D-CO) and Todd Young (R-IN), a measure aimed at supporting small- and mid-sized businesses most affected by the COVID-19 crisis.

The Save Our Stages Act was included in the $900 stimulus bill passed by Congress on December 21, 2020. Frank called the funding "the lifeline our industry so desperately needs to emerge from a devastating year."
