= Dayna Frank =

Business owner

Dayna Frank is an American businesswoman who has served as president and CEO of First Avenue Productions, independently owned and operated concert venue and promoter, since 2009.

In her time with First Avenue Productions she has expanded the business from its original venue First Avenue & 7th Street Entry to include the Fine Line, the Turf Club, the Palace Theatre, the Fitzgerald Theater, and The Depot Tavern all located in Minneapolis - Saint Paul Minnesota.

Frank also served as board president for the National Independent Venue Association (NIVA) which she co-founded with Rev. Moose, Managing Partner at Marauder in New York City and Gary Witt, executive director of Pabst Theater Group in Milwaukee in the wake of COVID-19's devastating effect on the live entertainment industry.

Frank is on the board of trustees for the Walker Art Center, the chair of the board of directors for the Twin Cities Music Community Trust, was a 2018 Henry Crown Fellow at the Aspen Institute, and served as a board member for the Minneapolis Parks Foundation.

== Early life and education ==
Frank was born in Golden Valley, Minnesota in May 1979. She grew up attending Temple Israel in Uptown Minneapolis.

Her father, Byron, was an accountant before retirement and worked as a business manager for First Avenue since its inception 1970 before eventually owning the company.

Frank graduated from Hopkins High School in 1997. She studied photography and earned her B.A. in Cultural Studies from New York University in 2001.

== Career ==
=== Early career ===
In 2004 Frank moved to Los Angeles to begin work as an assistant at Creative Artists Agency moving to Watermark Productions and Paramount Vantage a film division of Paramount Pictures. In 2006 Frank began work with VH1 working in Scripted Series Development & Production overseeing projects like Single Ladies, Star Stories, Acceptable.tv, I Hate My 30s, and Pedro. a television biopic on Pedro Zamora, from MTV's “The Real World San Francisco".

=== First Avenue Productions ===
In the year 2000 Byron Frank and a team of business associates bought the First Avenue building while the club was struggling against larger trends in the music industry, growing local competition, and corporate music promoters. On November 2, 2004 First Avenue's original owner, and Byron Frank's former business partner, Allen Fingerhut took First Avenue into bankruptcy leading to 130 employees being out of work and multiple scheduled concerts needing to be rescheduled. Following a legal battle, protests from local music fans, and attention to the situation from former Minneapolis Mayor and long time First Avenue concert attendee R.T. Rybak, the case was resolved (the judge presiding in the bankruptcy case noted, "I gather there is some urgency about this"), and the club was reopened by new partners including former First Avenue concert promoters, talent buyers, and general managers, Jack Meyers and Steve McClellan along with Byron Frank, with shows resuming after one week's closure.

In 2009 Byron Frank experienced a stroke leading him to call his two daughters and inform them that he intended to sell First Avenue to Live Nation or another deep-pocketed corporation if neither of them were willing to take over.

"The idea that the club could wind up in the hands of a company that's not responsible to Minneapolis/St. Paul and didn't inherently understand the beauty of this market ... was unfathomable," Dayna said in a 2014 interview.

In August 2014 First Avenue announced the purchase of the Turf Club in Saint Paul which dates back to 1940. Largely leaving the venue the same, the First Avenue team updated the speaker systems and renovated the bathrooms while keeping the core of the building as it was at the point of purchase. Former owner Tom Scanlon said “I had lots of people interested in buying the place, but First Avenue just made perfect sense. They know the place and the business very well. I'm confident the future of the Turf Club is absolutely safe in their hands.”

March 10, 2017 the Palace Theatre hosted the first concert with First Avenue Productions co-managing and co-operating with the City of Saint Paul. Frank and First Avenue Productions worked with the city leaders to oversee a $14.7 million renovation converting the building from a shuttered movie theater to a 2,800 capacity venue featuring contemporary music and events.

On October 1, 2018 First Avenue purchased and took over the operation of the Fine Line in Minneapolis. Originally opened in 1987 the Fine Line has a capacity of 650 people for concerts. "We’re incredibly excited to add the Fine Line to the First Avenue family, and really — more importantly — to keep this local venue independently owned and operated," said owner Frank in a press release.

On October 24, 2018 First Avenue announced that it had purchased the Fitzgerald Theater in Saint Paul from Minnesota Public Radio. The Fitzgerald long operated as the home of A Prairie Home Companion from 1978 until 2016 when musician Chris Thile took over the program and renamed it Live From Here. In a Minnesota Public Radio article Frank is quoted as saying: "St. Paul is becoming a destination for many musicians, just as Minneapolis has been. We're committed to helping to grow St. Paul's music scene as well."

In a 2021 Relix article Frank recalled memories of her time growing up in the club, reflected on her work at the club since her father's stroke, and stated that: "it became my mission to keep it independent and keep it intact—and to make sure that future generations of Minnesotans could enjoy it."

=== National Independent Venue Association (NIVA) ===
On March 12, 2020, 75 independent venues and stakeholders joined for a call organized by Independent Venue Week (IVW), to discuss the economic impact of the COVID-19 pandemic on live entertainment.

NIVA formed following the IVW call to lobby for assistance from the federal government after thousands of small businesses across the country were affected by the COVID-19 lockdowns. Within a matter of days its membership grew to some 450 members and a week later it had expanded to 900. NIVA currently represents over 3,000 venues, promoters, and festivals in all 50 states and Washington D.C.

On April 9, 2020, NIVA's official formation as a 501(c)(6) trade association was announced along with the news that Frank would serve as the board president.

Frank told Pollstar "NIVA came out of an Independent Venue Week town hall that Moose started having about a week after everything was being shuttered, and it was just so powerful. It was probably the first time for many of us to talk to each other, to independent promoters and venue owners, and be able to share resources and knowledge. We realized that if we are going to make it through we have to do it together and be unified. At the end of one of the town halls we talked about the need for a group, a trade association or alliance, to be formed with all the independents to share knowledge and resources and, most importantly, to get some representation in D.C. as these stimulus bills are being written to make sure we have resources and protection for the long-term health and future of our industry."

Frank told Rolling Stone that "90% of its member venues report they do not have cash on hand to last more than six months without federal intervention, and 55% say they do not have enough to last more than three months."

NIVA immediately went to work to become the team that organized lobbying and grassroots efforts to pass the bipartisan Save Our Stages Act, which became the Shuttered Venues Operators Grant Program, that was signed into law as part of the second COVID-19 Relief Bill on December 27, 2020.

This process led to over 2 million letters from music fans being delivered to Congress.

On June 18, 2020, 600 artists, including Dave Grohl of Foo Fighters, Mavis Staples, Lady Gaga, André 3000, Coldplay, Willie Nelson, Billie Ellish, Gary Clark Jr., Robert Plant of Led Zeppelin, Miranda Lambert, Billy Joel, Earth Wind & Fire, Kacey Musgraves, Leon Bridges, Wyclef Jean, Bon Iver, Jay Leno, Tiffany Haddish, Jeff Foxworthy, Jerry Seinfeld, and Tig Notaro, issued a letter to Congress asking legislators to provide financial support for independent venues and promoters.

October 16–18, 2020 NIVA and YouTube hosted the #SOSFest which Billboard called the most star-packed, culturally consequential music experience of the pandemic. Stars ranging from Billie Eilish to Dave Matthews and 33 others performed live stream sets from 25 independent venues across America hosted by Reggie Watts to raise $1.8 million for NIVA's efforts.

Minnesota Senator Amy Klobuchar was a champion on the Save our Stages act, which was co-led by Republican Senator John Cornyn, that provided $15 billion in funding to independent venues, promoters, and festivals in all 50 states and Washington D.C.

“Live venues were among the first businesses to close down from the pandemic and the last to reopen. As I worked to pass the Save Our Stages Act, Dayna Frank was a crucial partner in fighting to ensure independent venues could stay afloat, including our beloved First Avenue,” Klobuchar said in a statement.

== Personal life ==
Frank is a Reform Jew.

In the November 2012 election Minnesota had a statewide proposed constitutional amendment to define marriage as between a man and a woman which was defeated. During the election cycle Frank purchased a downtown Minneapolis billboard ad that read, "Don't limit the freedom to marry. First Avenue supports same-sex marriage and equality for all people."

In 2019 President Donald Trump hosted a political rally at the Target Center in Minneapolis across the street from First Avenue. Leading up to the rally a Donald Trump baby balloon was inflated on the roof of First Avenue. When asked about the position to do so Frank informed The Hill that the business has used its venues “to give candidates on both sides a platform, including those with whom we don't agree, but the actions and policies of this administration are in direct conflict to First Avenue's core values.” “First Avenue is standing with our community, and standing up for our beliefs, letting the world know we do not accept this President's divisive rhetoric. When we were approached about hosting the balloon, we said yes,” First Avenue donated all profits earned from the concerts hosted that night to Planned Parenthood North Central States.

Frank plays pickleball. She is a Women's Singles Skills Group Gold Medalist from the 2021 Twin Cities Pickleball Classic.

== Awards and honors ==
- Aspen Institute Henry Crown Fellowship (2018)
- Pollstar Impact 50 Cover Profile (2020)
- Rolling Stone Future 25 (2020)
- Star Tribune Arts Person of the Year (2021)
- VenuesNow Women In Venues (2021)
- Virtual Guest of Senator Amy Klobuchar to 2022 State of the Union (2022)
- Minnesota National Association of Women Business Owners Hall of Fame Inductee (2022)
- Billboard Touring Power Players (2024)
- Leadership Music Class of 2025
