= Dean Kohler =

American rock musician

Dean Ellis Kohler
- Origin: Portsmouth, Virginia, United States
- Genres: Garage rock; psychedelic; hard rock
- Years active: 1962–present
- Label: Elko

Dean Ellis Kohler is an American rock musician from Portsmouth, Virginia who has been active in various groups and as a solo artist since 1962. That year he formed Dean & the Mustangs, who later changed their name and recorded demos as the Satellites. In 1966 Kohler was drafted into the army as an MP in the Vietnam War. While stationed in Qui Nhơn, he formed the group, the Electrical Banana, who recorded several songs in an army tent, including two that were pressed into a limited number of 45 rpm records: one of the earliest known recorded covers of a Velvet Underground song, Lou Reed's "There She Goes Again", and Kohler's original, "She's Gone". In 1968, when he returned from duty to Portsmouth, he assembled a backing band and recorded the single "Gooseberry Pie". Later in 1968, he formed the band, the Soft Light, who appeared weekly on a local TV show. and by the end of the decade the hard rock group, Mad Wax, who remained active into the 1970s. He chronicled his Vietnam War experiences in Rock 'N' Roll Soldier: A Memoir, published in 2009. Kohler's recordings with the Satellites and the Electrical Banana are included on the compilation, Aliens, Psychos & Wild Things, Volume 1, and "Gooseberry Pie" on Essential Pebbles, Volume 2.

== Biography ==
Musician Dean Kohler is from Portsmouth, Virginia and got his start in 1962 as the founder and leader of a combo, Dean & the Mustangs. The other members in the group were Joe Spear on rhythm guitar, Cecil Baines on bass, Billy Watson on drums, and Roger Thacker added as singer. In 1964 Roger Thacker left and Dean became the lead singer and still the lead guitarist. In late 1964 Billy left the group and was replaced by Lynde Gilliam on drums. In early 1965 Joe Spear left the group, and they added Cliff Eaton on keyboards and changed their name to the Satellites. At this time the group came under the influence of the British Invasion. In 1965, they recorded an acetate of the songs "Will You Stay?", which displayed the influence of the Kinks, and "The Next Boy". These were the Satellites' only recordings.

Their plans were interrupted in 1966, when Kohler was drafted into the army to serve in the Vietnam War as part of the 127th MP Company in Qui Nhơn, Vietnam. With the permission and support of his commander, Captain Richard Leadbetter, Kohler assembled band, the Electrical Banana. The moniker was chosen partially in reference to the front cover of the Velvet Underground's first album, The Velvet Underground & Nico, a lyric in Donovan's "Mellow Yellow", and influenced by the book Fuzz, Acid and Flowers. The group practiced and performed at military bases, sometimes wearing banana outfits. In 1967, they recorded several songs in an army tent in Qui Nhon including two that were included on a limited number of 45 rpm records single: one of the earliest known covers of a Velvet Underground song, Lou Reed's "There She Goes Again" along with the Kohler original, "She's Gone". One of the records came into the hands of the compilers of the Aliens, Psychos & Wild Things, Volume 1 CD, which was released in 2000 and contained both songs.

Upon returning to Portsmouth in late 1967, Kohler assembled a new group with the backing lineup of George Newsome on bass, Robert Craig on organ, and Johnny Johnston on drums to record his only official single in 1968, "Gooseberry Pie", for the Elko label, which was later included on Essential Pebbles, Volume 2 in 1998. That year he formed the group the Soft light, who recorded several songs, including "Out-of-Sight", and appeared the television programs, Disc-O-Ten in 1968 and Saturday Session in 1969. In 1974 he created and produced a one-hour TV special that aired on the local NBC affiliate WAVY-TV called "Rock Me" featuring his band, Mad Wax, and other local bands.

During the 1970s, he fronted Mad Wax, Dean on lead guitar and lead vocals, George Newsome on bass and vocals, and Tom Ryan on drums, a power trio that recorded an unreleased album. The band's name at first was Spectrum but after four months was changed to Mad Wax. In the 1980s and 1990s, he formed and led the 1950s/1960s tribute showband Big Bubba & the Blockbusters. He chronicled his Vietnam War experiences in the book, Rock 'N' Roll Soldier: A Memoir, published by Harper Collins in 2009.

== Discography ==
=== With the Satellites ===
- ""Will You Stay?" b/w "The Next Boy" (acetate, 1965)

=== With the Electrical Banana ===
- "There She Goes" b/w "She's Gone" (limited number 45 rpm, 1967) 2026 album release “Dean Kohler & The Electrical Banana- Live in Vietnam 1967”

==== With The Soft Light ====
Unreleased album of originals and covers recorded at D'Arcy Studio 1969

==== With Mad Wax ====
2026 released an album “Dean Kohler & Mad Wax-, The MCA Demos” recorded at Brockington & Guess and Ambassador Studio 1974

=== Solo ===
- "Gooseberry Pie" b/w "The Next Boy" (Elko 3001, November 1968)

== Bibliography ==
- Kohler, Dean Ellis (2009). Rock 'n' Roll Soldier: A Memoir (1st ed.). New York, New York: HarperTeen. ISBN 978-0061242557.
- Markesich, Mike (2012). Teenbeat Mayhem (1st ed.). Branford, Connecticut: Priceless Info Press. ISBN 978--0-06-124255-7.
