= Dory Kahalé =

American DJ and producer (born 1971)

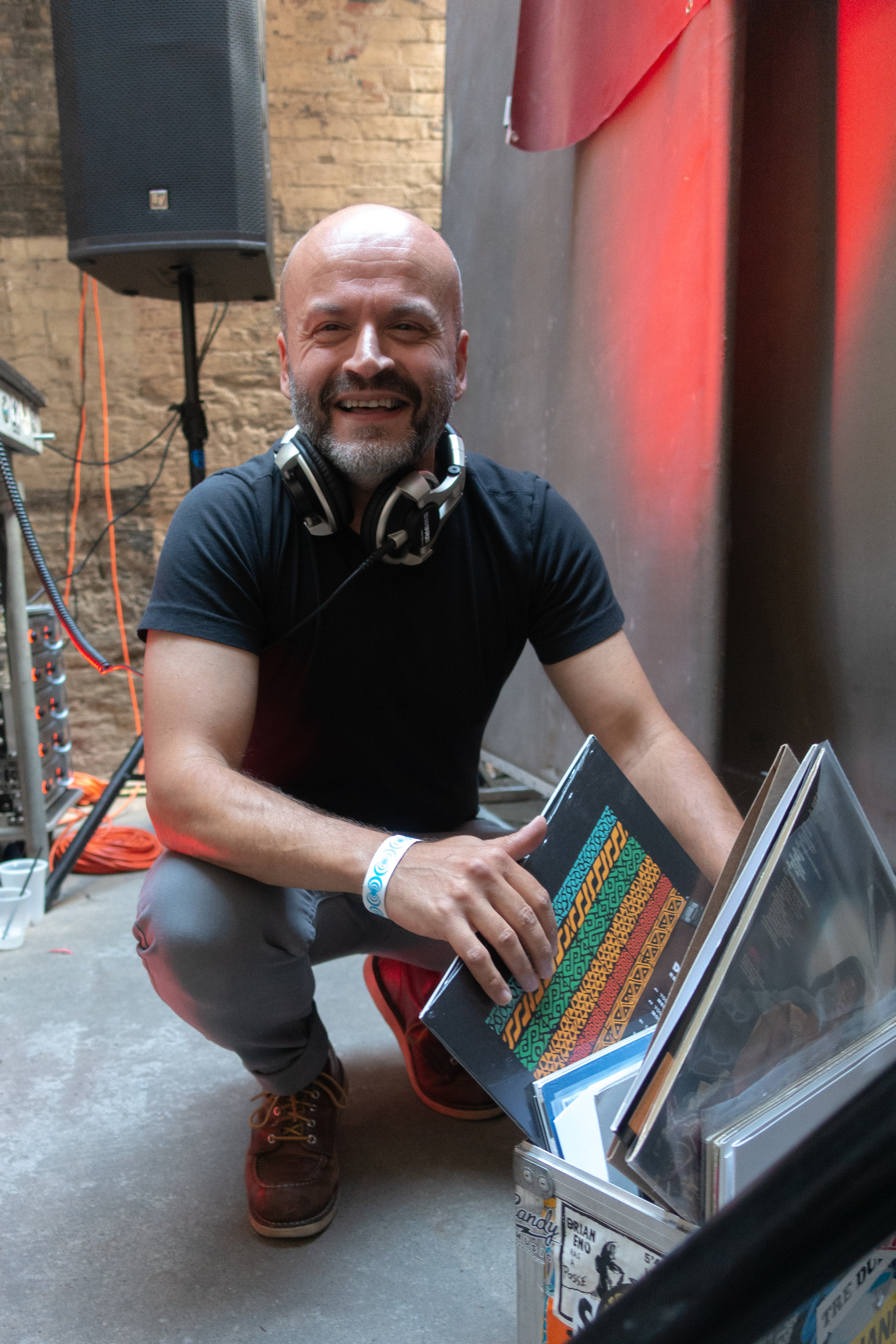
- Kahalé in 2016
- Born: May 25, 1971; Beirut, Lebanon
- Other names: DJ Apollo, Dirty McKenzie, and others
- Occupations: DJ; producer
- Years active: 1992–present

Dory Kahalé (born May 25, 1971) is an American DJ, producer, and entrepreneur from Minneapolis.

Active in the electronic dance music and techno scenes since the 1990s, Kahalé has released more than 50 records under a variety of pseudonyms, most notably DJ Apollo, Dirty McKenzie, Ralph Laurenn, and 1DJ. Minnesota alt-weekly City Pages praised his depth of expertise in the field, saying that "few people know more about dance music and its history in Minneapolis than Dory Kahalé". His work has gained attention across America, Germany, and the UK.

== Early life ==
Kahalé was born May 25, 1971, in Beirut, Lebanon. His family lived in West Berlin, Germany, until he was 10 as refugees of the Lebanese Civil War. His family emigrated to the United States under political asylum in the early 1980s, living in Atlanta, Georgia, before settling permanently in Minneapolis, Minnesota.

Kahalé began playing and composing electronic music from a young age; he got his first Casio keyboard at age 11. Early influences included Kraftwerk, Ultravox spinoff Visage, Depeche Mode, and Giorgio Moroder.

== Career ==
Kahalé began DJing in 1989, and was on the ground floor of the rave and club-music movement in the Midwest. He has been releasing music since the early 1990s, working under his own name and about 15 pseudonyms, most notably DJ Apollo, Dirty McKenzie, and Ralph Laurenn. Kahalé often uses these aliases as ways to distinguish his work in distinct subgenres of electronic music, including techno, house, trip hop, and ambient. Other pseudonyms include Cocaine on Her Dress, Apollo of Minneapolis, Terrence Hawke, 1DJ, DJ Sloth, The Bureau, Local 120, Statik, and The Bully. His ghetto house alias "Ralph Laurenn" is a play on the name of Chicago house DJ Robert Armani. He takes broad inspiration from jazz, rock, hip-hop, and other styles beyond electronic dance music; one of the main synthesizer lines in his 1996 single "B True 2 Your School" was inspired by the guitar riff in Primus' "Big Brown Beaver."

Under the moniker DJ Apollo, Kahalé became an integral part of the dance-music scene that coalesced at historic nightclub First Avenue in the 1990s. Along with Kevin Cole, Woody McBride, and others, Kahalé helped to create the distinctive upper Midwest techno style, characterized by electronic dance magazine Massive as "a very original, unique, distinctive sound: Hard drums, but very clear, fresh, crisp production". As both a DJ and producer, Kahalé's open-minded interest in genre cross-pollination made him one of the bridges between the EDM, industrial, darkwave, and gothic rock scenes in the Twin Cities.

He performed at the groundbreaking electronic music festival Furthur in 1994, an early high point of rave culture in the United States, as well as the subsequent 1996 festival Even Furthur, which introduced U.S. audiences to Daft Punk.

In 1991, he joined Woody McBride's MORE (Minneapolis Organization of Rave Enthusiasts), and released several records on McBride's label Communique Records, as well as joining him on tour.

Kahalé started his own label, Bass United Recordings, in 2001. Bass United has released several dozen records by Kahalé and other artists such as Estate, as well as remixes by Faze Action, Dustin Zahn, D Cup, Odahl, and Bryan Gerrard. Alternative music blog BlackPlastic praised Bass United as "an imprint that has been pushing outstanding eclectic and electric music for the last decade."

Kahalé has also appeared on compilations by Frankie Bones, Nigel Richards, and Bad Boy Bill, and on record labels including Sounds, Giant Wheel, Blueline, Cyber, Virtual, Sockett, V-Wax, Sub-Terranean, Javelin, and Sixeleven.

His work as a record producer and remixer has spanned a wide variety of genres, working with artists including electro-pop band Telephone, industrial group Zwaremachine, electronic pop artist Sophia Shorai, and indie-rock band So It Goes.

In 2018, Kahalé opened for Giorgio Moroder at First Avenue, performing as Dirty McKenzie; a review on the website of radio station KCMP/The Current praised Kahalé's set as "the sugariest disco I’ve ever heard".

Kahalé has also worked in the advertising industry since 2001, and runs his own music supervision company, North Music Agency.

He continues to perform frequently as a live DJ.

== Critical reception ==
Rave archivist Adam Shaw of Mixtape Magic named two of Kahalé's tapes (Ghetto Booty, made under the alias Ralph Laurenn, and DJ Apollo's Bass In Yer Face) among his favorite house music of all time, saying that they "will go to the grave with me."

Reviewing DJ Apollo's 1994 mixtapes Kiss My Acid and Double Dipped, the electronica zine Massive called his ability to switch between styles "refreshing", saying that his mix of acid and trance "takes off where experimental techno left off" and that "it seems to tempt the inner realms of the brain with its layering of odd layers and funky beats. ... This rocks the chaotic cow."

In 2012, Kahalé won a contest sponsored by Swedish record label MB Disco and audioporncentral.com to remix the music of Giorgio Moroder; Kahalé's song, "E=MC² (Dirty McKenzie's Evolution Remix)", was released on the compilation album E=APC² Audio Porn Central (Giorgio Moroder Remix Project). German electronic music magazine reviewed Kahalé's version positively, saying "his wonderfully melodic mix is pure joy."

Grahame Farmer of dance-music website Data Transmission called the 2013 Dirty McKenzie single "Butterfly" "a true joy to behold", saying that in reworking the original song by Paul Johnson, "he successfully morphs it into a dancefloor weapon that’s full of vigour and colour." The website Plain & Simple called the song "sympathetic to the original whilst bringing with it plenty of modern flavours. There’s jack in the beats, tightness in the smeared synths and kinetics in the groove. A fine job all round."

== Honors and awards ==
Kahalé was named Best Club DJ in City Pages' annual Best of the Twin Cities poll in 2004. The publication praised Kahalé's facility with handling many different subgenres of dance music, and said that as leader of the Bass United group, he was "helping to push local DJs and producers toward the national scene."

As DJ Apollo, Kahalé was honored in 2001 with a star on the outside mural of the Minneapolis nightclub First Avenue, recognizing performers that have played sold-out shows or have otherwise demonstrated a major contribution to the culture at the iconic venue. Receiving a star "might be the most prestigious public honor an artist can receive in Minneapolis," according to journalist Steve Marsh.

== Selected discography ==
=== As primary artist ===
- Local 120, "Anarchy In Beverly Hills" on Cabin Rave: 10,000 Homo Fishermen compilation (Audiocon Release, 1993)
- DJ Apollo, "Anarchy in Beverly Hills" (Communique, 1992)
- Ralph Laurenn, Work That Mutha Fucka mix tape (1993)
- DJ Apollo, Kiss My Acid (1994)
- DJ Apollo, Double Dipped (1994)
- DJ Apollo, B True 2 Your Skool (Communique Records, 1996)
- DJ Apollo, Trainwrecker (Communique Records, 1996)
- DJ Apollo, Old School Succession (Communique Records, 1996)
- DJ Apollo, The Bully (Head In The Clouds, 1996)
- Terrence Hawke/Timeblind, Hard Times (Head in the Clouds, 1996)
- DJ Apollo, Chicks Dig It (Sounds, 1998)
- DJ Apollo, The Drone Ate My Bass (Giant Wheel, 2000)
- Dory Kahalé, 1DJ Desperate for Attention (Bass United Recordings, 2004)
- Dory Kahalé, "In Vain" (Bass United Recordings, 2004)
- Dory Kahalé, "Wasted Oblivious" (Bass United Recordings, 2004)
- Dory Kahalé, "Nothing Else" (Bass United Recordings, 2004)
- Dory Kahalé, "Turn It On" (Bass United Recordings, 2004)
- Dory Kahalé, "Completely" (Bass United Recordings, 2004)
- Cocaine On Her Dress, 8 Bit (Bass United Recordings, 2004)
- Dory Kahalé, "Drive Faster" (Bass United Recordings, 2004)
- DJ Apollo, "Bad Ass" (Bass United Recordings, 2004)
- DJ Apollo, "Old Skool Succession" (Bass United Recordings, 2004)
- DJ Apollo, "Trainwrecker" (Bass United Recordings, 2004)
- DJ Apollo, "Alien Pornography" (Bass United Recordings, 2004)
- DJ Apollo, "Loner" (Bass United Recordings, 2004)
- 1DJ, Desperate For Attention (Bass United Recordings, 2005)
- Dirty McKenzie, Wake Up! (Bass United Recordings, 2008)
- Apollo Of Minneapolis, Telstar (Bass United Recordings, 2011)
- Apollo Of Minneapolis, Checkpoint Charlie (Bass United Recordings, 2011)
- Dirty McKenzie, Dirty Kitchen Trax (Bass United Recordings, 2011)
- Dirty McKenzie, "Get Up Off My Cloud" (Bass United Recordings, 2011)
- Dirty McKenzie, "Life After Ludes" (Bass United Recordings, 2011)
- Dirty McKenzie, "I Like It Like That" (Bass United Recordings, 2011)
- Dirty McKenzie, "Romancing The Nile" (Bass United Recordings, 2011)
- Dirty McKenzie, "The Fever" (Bass United Recordings, 2011)
- Dirty McKenzie, "La Fievre" (Bass United Recordings, 2011)
- Dirty McKenzie, Best Workouts (Bass United Recordings, 2012)
- Dirty McKenzie, "Right On Time" (Bass United Recordings, 2012)
- Nobiilo, Your Love (Bass United Recordings, 2012)
- Dirty McKenzie, Dig It! (The Scratch Mill, 2013)
- Dirty McKenzie, "Butterfly" (Bass United Recordings, 2013)
- Dirty McKenzie, Jenny Lovlein, "Don't Call" (The Scratch Mill, 2013)
- Dirty McKenzie, "Slipstream" (LW Recordings, 2013)
- Dirty McKenzie, Let's Riot (The Scratch Mill, 2014)
- Dirty McKenzie, "Rip It " (The Scratch Mill, 2014)
- Dirty McKenzie, "Bang Pop!" (LW Recordings, 2014)
- Dirty McKenzie, "La Fievre" (LW Recordings, 2016)
- Dirty McKenzie, "Feelies " (The Scratch Mill, 2018)
- Dirty McKenzie, "I Like It Like That" (LW Recordings, 2019)
- Dirty McKenzie, "Dizzy" (Equation Recordings, 2021)

=== As producer or remixer ===
- Telephone, Elevator Operator (Bass United Recordings, 2005)
- Giorgio Moroder vs. Dirty McKenzie, "E=MC² (Dirty McKenzie's Evolution Remix)" from Giorgio Moroder, E=APC² Audio Porn Central (Giorgio Moroder Remix Project) (MB Disco, 2012)
- Estate, Slipstream/Pressure's On (The Scratch Mill, 2013)
- Estate, Slipstream/Pressure's On - The Complete Remixes (Bass United Recordings, 2013)
- Sophia Shorai, Try EP (2014)
- Spymob, "Heavy Load (Dirty McKenzie Remix)" (2014)
- "Another Way [Dirty Mckenzie Remix]" from Zwaremachine, Be a Light (2019)

=== Compilation appearances ===
- Tim Xavier, George G-Tech Rontiris, Dirty McKenzie, Reconstructions II (Enemy Records, 2012)
- Various Artists, Funky Disco House Sessions Vol. 10 (LW Recordings, 2013)
- Various Artists, America, Fuck Yeah!!! (Brooklyn Fire, 2014)
- Various Artists, Nu-Disco Essentials Vol. 08 (LW Recordings, 2014)
- Various Artists, Future Indie Dance Classics, Vol. 6 (LW Recordings, 2015)
- Various Artists, Music is Not Dead Vol. 3 (9G Records, 2015)
- Various Artists, House Your Body (Brooklyn Fire, 2016)
- Various Artists, The Sound Of Indie Dance, Vol. 01 (LW Recordings, 2016)
- Various Artists, Electro Kool-Aid Acid Test (Brooklyn Fire, 2018)
- Various Artists, Nu-Disco Selections, Vol. 07 (LW Recordings, 2019)
- Various Artists, Tommie Say It's A Vibe (Brooklyn Fire, 2020)
