= Danny's Reasons =

American garage rock band

- Danny's Reasons in 1967.

Background information
- Also known as: Danny and the Night Sounds
- Origin: Minneapolis, Minnesota, United States
- Genres: Garage rock
- Years active: 1962 - 1975
- Labels: INC; Carnaby; Hand; Uncle Sam's; Great Hall
- Past members: Danny Stevens; Mickey Stevens; Frank Marino; Bob Gonyea; Ceedy Van Dusen; Carl Bradley; Jimmy Lawrence; Chuck Edwards; Ross Ingram; Steve Maurer

Danny's Reasons were an American garage rock band formed in Minneapolis, Minnesota, in 1962. The band, well known for a longevity which outlasted most garage bands of the era, released five singles throughout their recording career, including covers of "Little Diane" and "Under My Thumb". Although Danny's Reasons' popularity never precipitated to much national chart success, they performed regularly across the United States and have since been featured on compilation albums.

== History ==
Frontman Danny Stevens (keyboards, lead vocals) formed the band in 1962, then known as Danny and the Night Sounds, with the first verifiable line-up including his brother Mickey Stevens (tambourine, conga, maracas), Frank Marino (lead guitar), Bob Gonyea (bass guitar), and Ceedy Van Dusen (drums). Initially, Danny Stevens directed the group to perform almost exclusively at private gathering, aside from some state fairs, for business and media figures in hopes of establishing connections in the music industry. As a result, the band earned an appearance on the region's first television show to feature live music, A Date with Dino, and were regularly scheduled at teen clubs such as the Vincent Van a-Go-Go.

With the onset of the British Invasion, the band, renamed Danny's Reasons, evolved their musical style and their stage images between 1964 and 1965 based mainly on the work of the Rolling Stones, although the group also incorporated songs recorded by the Animals into their repertoire. After hiring Bob Dylan's younger brother David Zimmerman as manager and Dick Shapiro as promoter, Danny's Reasons embarked on a Midwest and West coast college tour, which reached its pinnacle at the nightclub London Fog to support the band's sponsor, Gibson guitar, in Los Angeles.

In 1966, Danny's Reasons released their debut single, a cover version of Dion's "Little Diane", on INC Records. Coupled by their follow-up, "Under My Thumb", on Carnaby Records in 1967, the two singles received enormous regional commercial success. The B-side to "Under My Thumb", the band-original "Triangles", has been featured on more compilation albums than any other Danny's Reasons recording, appearing on albums such as Changes, Pebbles, Volume 22, and Essential Pebbles, Volume 2.

In 1967, at the inaugural Connie Awards held on May 22, 1967 in the Sheraton-Ritz Hotel in Minneapolis hosted by Charlie Boone of WCCO radio, Danny Stevens was honored with Best Vocal-Single and Best Showman-Single. Bob Gonyea was awarded best Bass Guitar, while Best Drummer was awarded to Ceedy Van Dusen. Danny's Reasons' popularity rose still further with an East coast tour and an appearance on American Bandstand. The group closed out 1967 with almost a completely different line-up which retained the Stevens brothers, and included Carl Bradley (keyboards, vocals), Jimmy Lawrence (congas, vocals) Chuck Edwards (lead guitar), Ross Ingram (bass guitar), and 1968 Connie Award winning drummer Steve Maurer (drums). This configuration recorded the group's third single "One Eye Closed" on Hand Records.

In 1968, Danny Stevens made a financial venture in the nightclub business, leasing a building in downtown Minneapolis to establish the Diamond Lil club. Inspired by the format in the Whisky a Go Go, the Diamond Lil catered to all ages and featured national acts, most notably Janis Joplin. Two years later, Jack Dow approached Danny and requested Danny to leave the liquor license as the building was being sold to the Friar's Club. In return, Danny was offered the Class A liquor license from Jack Dow who owned the famous Hastings Hotel that was being demolished. Stevens closed the Diamond Lil club to form another establishment in the city, known as the Depot, where, on September 13, 1970, the live album Gather at the Depot was recorded and produced by Frank Marino; one of the original member of Danny's Reasons. It encompasses numerous Minnesota acts, including Danny Reasons performing "One Eye Closed". The Depot was eventually transformed into Uncle Sam's and then into the world famous First Avenue- still using the original Class A liquor license from 1970 that was issued to Danny Stevens from Jack Dow.

The band released two more singles, "Young Emotions" and "Time", in the early 1970s, but they are not as highly regarded as their earlier work. Stevens continued to perform with variations of Danny's Reasons throughout the 1980s. In 1999, Cloud 9 Records released Danny's Reasons, a comprehensive album that contains all the group's recorded material.

== Discography ==
=== Singles ===
- "Little Diane" b/w "Believe Me" - INC Records (#6935), 1966
- "Under My Thumb" b/w "Triangles" - Carnaby Records (#101), 1967
- "One Eye Closed" b/w "Thinking of You" (#9-420), 1967
- "Young Emotions" b/w "Hard Old Times" - Uncle Sam's Records (# S80-379-2408), 1972
- "Time" b/w "Vision of Love" - Great Hall Records (#991), 1975

=== Album ===
- Danny's Reasons - Cloud 9 Publishing (Cloud 9), 1999
