= Steve McClellan =

American concert promoter and educator (born 1950)

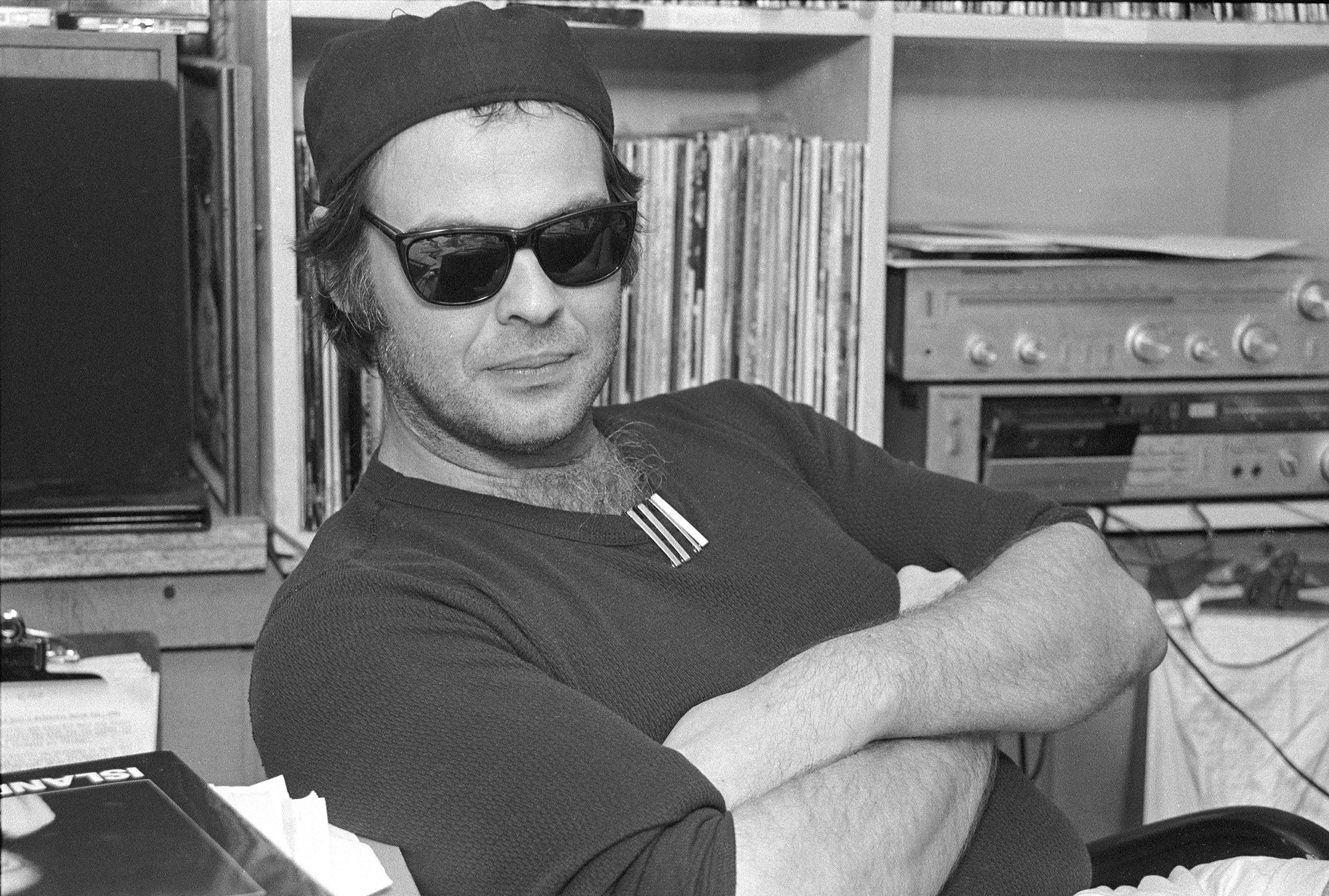
- McClellan in his office, First Avenue 1986
- Born: Stephen Thomas McClellan; March 22, 1950 (age 76); Minneapolis, Minnesota
- Occupations: Concert promoter, educator
- Years active: 1974–present

Stephen T. McClellan (born March 22, 1950) is an American concert promoter and educator. For 30 years he worked at a series of nightclubs housed in a former bus depot at the corner of First Avenue and 7th Street in downtown Minneapolis, promoting the careers of local musicians and expanding the reach of talent from around the world. These clubs—beginning with The Depot, Uncle Sam's, and Sam's (and 7th St. Entry)—eventually became the First Avenue & 7th St. Entry nightclub that buoyed the Minneapolis sound and contributed to the development of alternative rock and independent music.

McClellan is number 1 on a list of Unforgettable Minnesota Characters. At First Avenue, a music critic gave him the nickname "Chainsaw." Later, he taught music business and arts management at colleges in the Twin Cities. McClellan founded DEMO (originally as DMAF later DAMF) in 1999 to help aspiring musicians succeed.

== Early life ==
McClellan is the second-oldest of eleven children born to Robert T. McClellan, a U.S. Marine and decorated World War II fighter pilot, and Betty Brancheau. He grew up in a Catholic family in Minneapolis, Minnesota. He graduated from DeLaSalle High School in 1968, and attended the University of Minnesota, where he graduated in 1974 with a Bachelor of Arts in speech communications. McClellan worked for the Minnesota Public Interest Research Group (MPIRG) and wanted to join Ralph Nader's organization.

== First Avenue ==
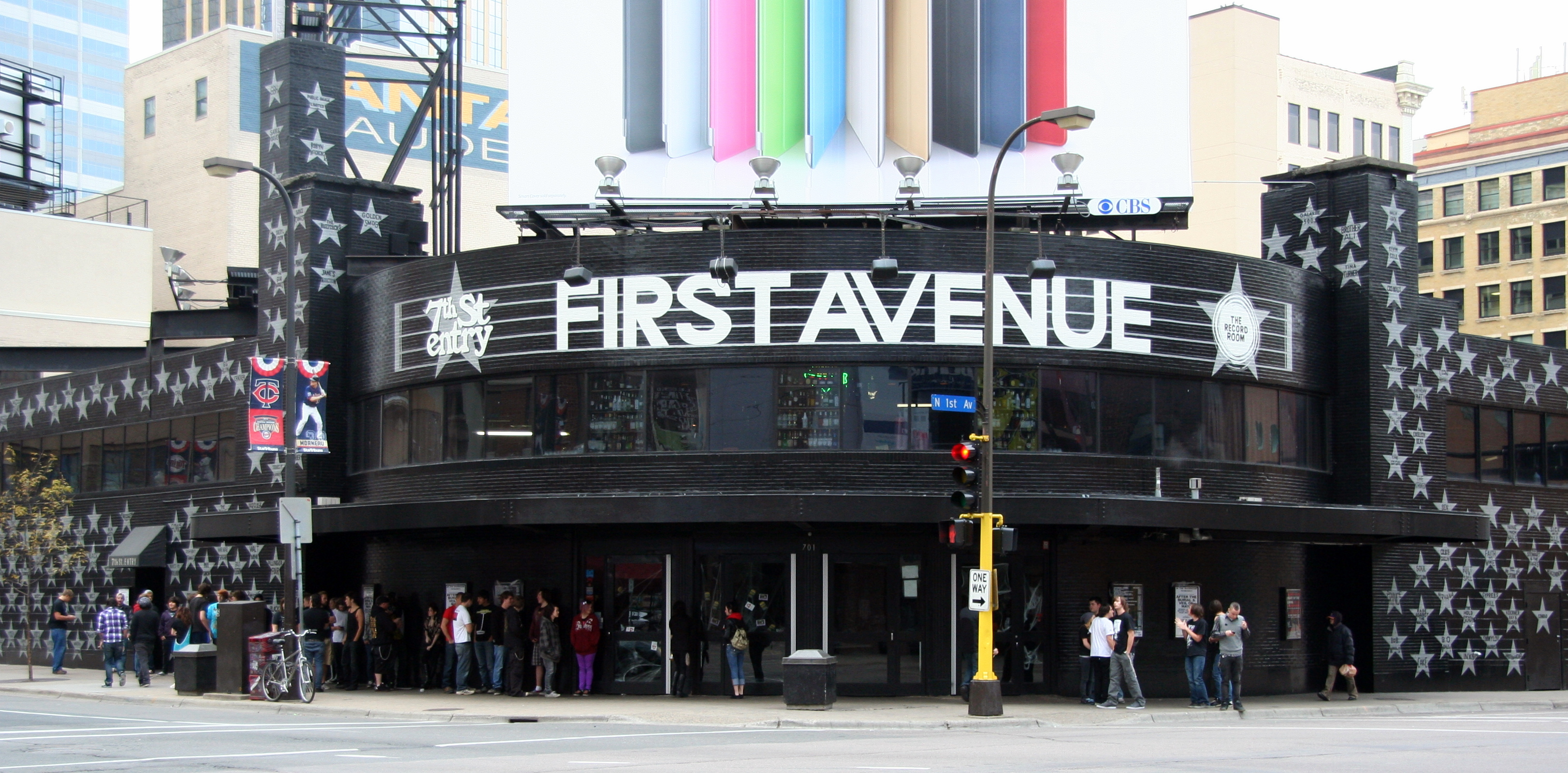
Called The Depot, then Uncle Sam's, then just Sam's, the club was renamed First Avenue in 1981.

In 1973, McClellan worked as a bar-back at Uncle Sam's, when it was run as a disco by the American Avents Corporation of Cincinnati from 1972 until 1979. American Avents, who operated in many U.S. cities, liked him and sent him to management training in Des Moines, Iowa, and Lincoln, Nebraska.

In 1980 Allan Fingerhut regained control of the business, and hired the partnership of McClellan and Jack Meyers (and later Dan Lessard) to manage the club. A McClellan booking in 1979, the Ramones, ushered disco out and in its place came punk and live rock and roll. For a few years, dance nights, ladies nights and male strippers in the main room paid the bills, but, on a shoestring budget, the annex 7th Street Entry opened in 1980, the fruit of a $1500 investment in a former coat room.

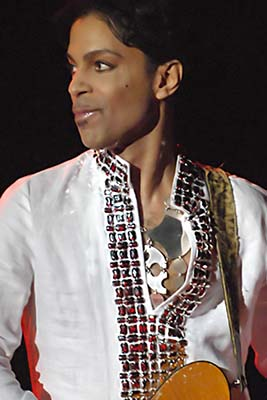
McClellan paid Prince $2500 plus part of the gross to play First Avenue in 1981, when black musicians could not usually play downtown.

McClellan became a talent buyer, the marketing director and eventually the general manager. Martin Keller describes McClellan's expansive bookings: "exotic Afro-pop, speed metal, funk, reggae, punk, pop, folk-rock, country rock, hip hop, and the occasional jazz and comedy acts". Working against the grain of segregation in Minneapolis which was hostile to the idea of black audiences, and of black musicians playing downtown, in the late 1970s McClellan booked black bands, notably Jimmy Jam in the eleven-piece Mind & Matter (and later Flyte Tyme and The Time). In 1981 following the one-hit wonder Lipps Inc., he booked Prince for the first of what would be nine full-blown concerts. Chris Riemenschneider quotes McClellan, "It was so exciting in the early '80s to see Prince mix the audiences, the racial diversity he brought."

Sam's was renamed First Avenue on New Year's Eve in 1981. McClellan earned the nickname "Chainsaw" from music critic P.D. Larson. As general manager, McClellan championed local talent and made performance space for Prince, Hüsker Dü, The Replacements, the Wallets, The Time, The Suburbs, Soul Asylum, and The Jayhawks. He promoted Nirvana, U2, Green Day, and R.E.M., the Red Hot Chili Peppers, and Run-DMC all early in their careers. He also presented legacy acts such as Tina Turner, Parliament-Funkadelic, and Ray Charles to sold-out crowds. Remembering the era's wild west of settlement with artists, Frank Riley thought McClellan was one of perhaps three "really reliable" promoters in the United States. Some of the contracts he signed with hundreds of groups from around the world can be seen online at the Minnesota Historical Society.

== Teaching and other associations ==
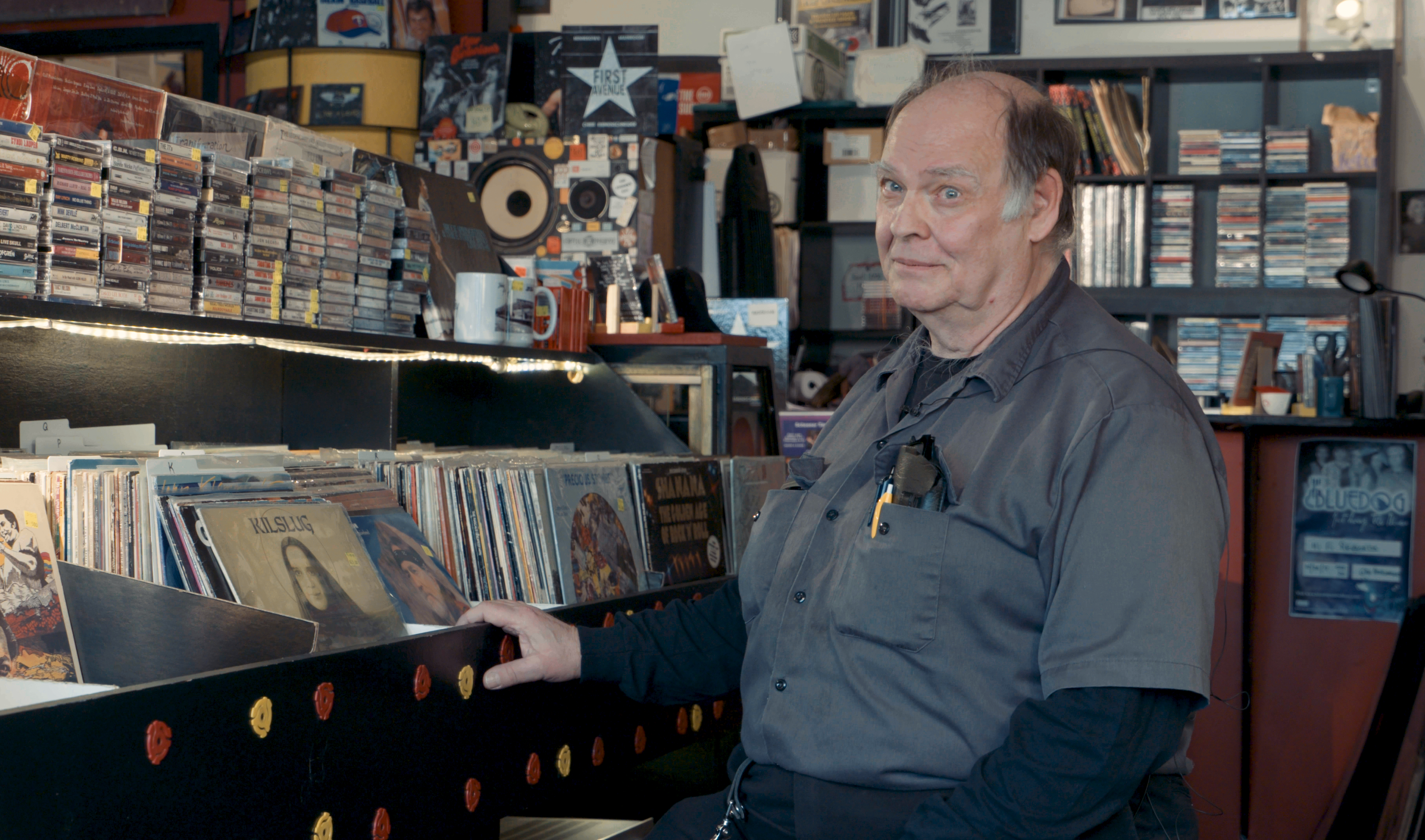
McClellan in 2019 at the Museum of Minnesota Music and HiFi Records. Photo courtesy of the Minnesota Historical Society.

After leaving First Avenue in 2004, McClellan taught music business at Globe University and Minnesota School of Business which since then has ceased operations, and later taught arts management at the now-defunct McNally Smith College of Music in Saint Paul.

He has served on the boards of Cedar Cultural Center, KFAI radio, Minnesota Public Interest Research Group and the Downtown Warehouse Association.

As of 2019, he was a part-time bartender at the Schooner Tavern in south Minneapolis.

== DEMO ==
In 1999, McClellan founded the non-profit DMAF (Developing Music and Arts Foundation) which in 2004 was rechristened DEMO (Diverse Emerging Music Organization) where he works to promote and educate developing musicians. He told Minnesota Public Radio in a 2014 interview that it is not the bottom line, but rather the "street level stuff" that is important. He also said to MPR in 2005 that he believes the cutting edge of music "is in the Twin Cities growing immigrant communities". Many of The Naked Songwriter series by DEMO were recorded at Orfield Laboratories.

Despite his stated dislike of recordings, McClellan wrote the liner notes for The Bootlegs Volume 1: Celebrating 35 years of First Avenue, proceeds from which go to DEMO.

== Personal life ==
McClellan claimed in early 2016 to ever have voted for only two major party candidates, George McGovern and Barack Obama. Instead, he much preferred third party politics.

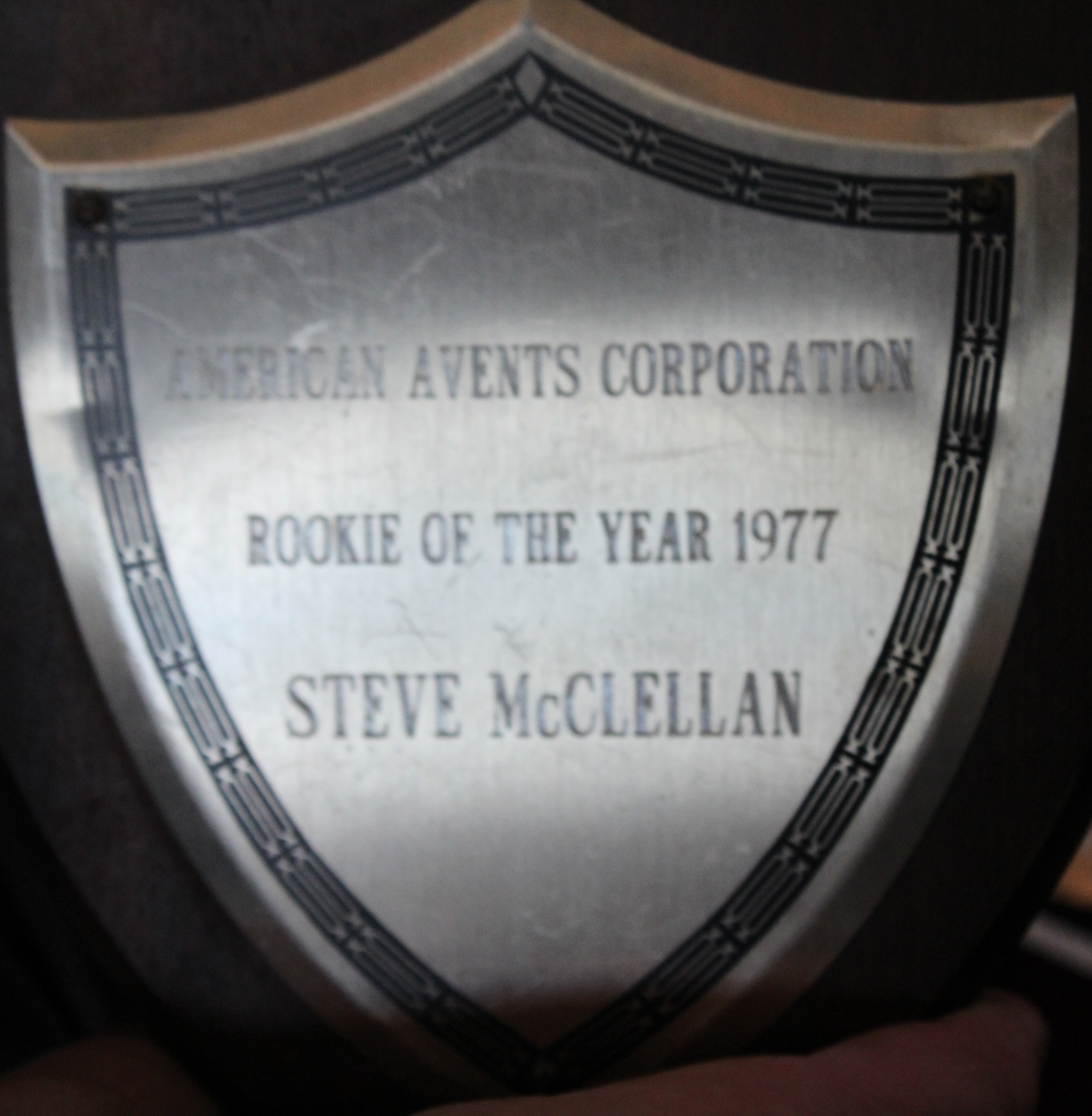
McClellan's American Avents Corporation award for Rookie of the Year

McClellan was married to Cindy Lawson, singer and guitarist for the Clams, and they have two daughters.

He moved to Cloquet, Minnesota, around 2020.

Brian Lambert of MinnPost describes him as, "dare we say, extraordinarily colorful". Jon Bream of the Star Tribune called him, "Quirky, cranky, verbosely opinionated and hugely influential".

== Awards and honors ==
After he became a manager at Uncle Sam's, American Avents named him Rookie of the Year in 1977. McClellan won the Connie Hector Award at the 1996 Minnesota Music Awards. In 2015 on McClellan's 65th birthday, mayor of Minneapolis, Betsy Hodges, and mayor of Saint Paul, Chris Coleman, celebrated a Steve McClellan Day with proclamations.

== Bibliography ==
- Keller, Martin (2019). Hijinx and Hearsay: Scenester Stories from Minnesota's Pop Life. Minnesota Historical Society Press. ISBN 9781681341323.
- Riemenschneider, Chris (October 15, 2017). First Avenue: Minnesota's Mainroom. Minnesota Historical Society Press. ISBN 9781681340449.
