= First Avenue (nightclub) =

Nightclub and music venue in Minneapolis, Minnesota

First Avenue and 7th St Entry
- The Mainroom, The Entry
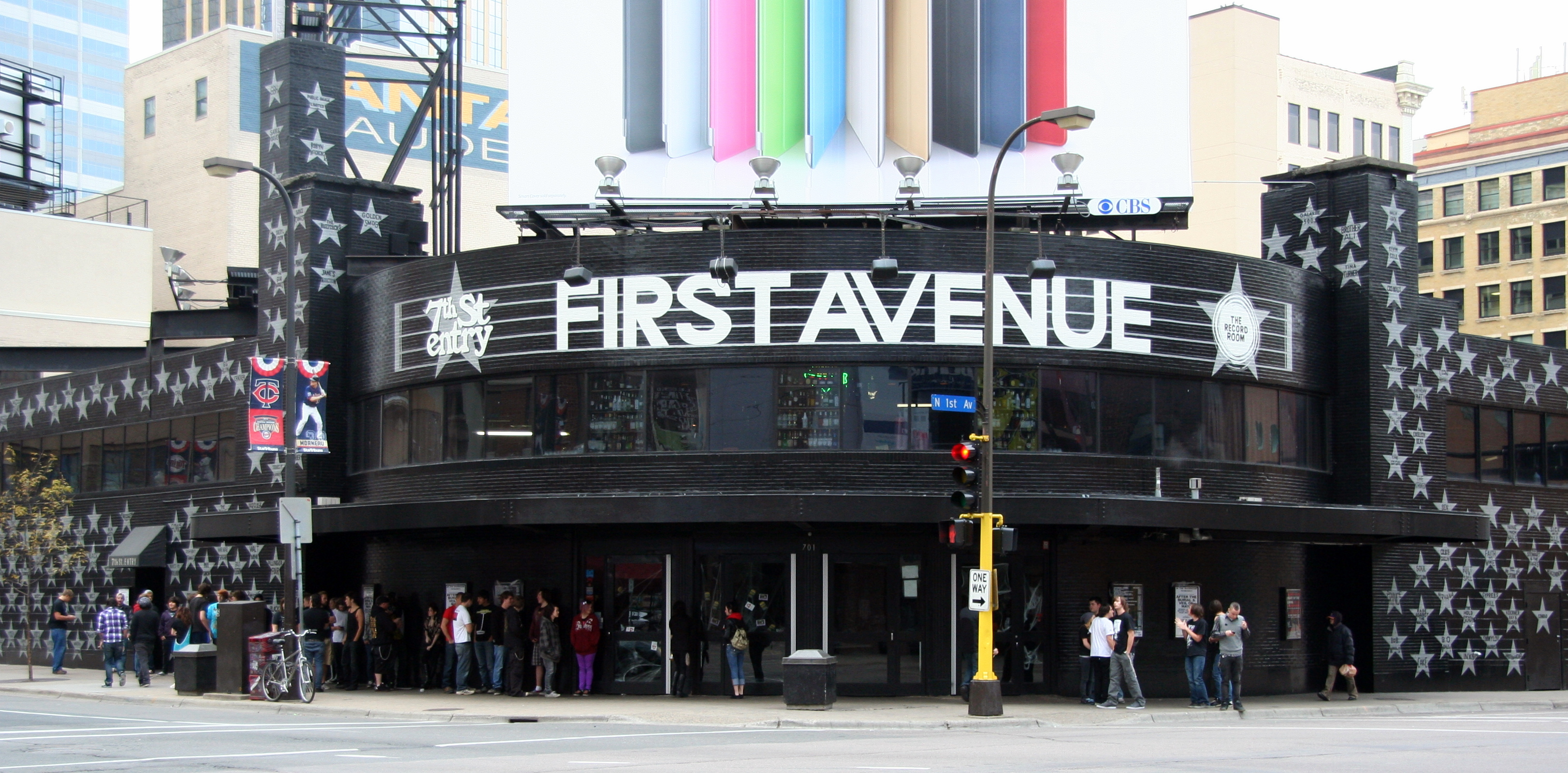
- First Avenue nightclub in Minneapolis
- Interactive map of First Avenue and 7th St Entry
- Former names: Minneapolis Greyhound Bus Depot (1937–1968); The Depot (1970–1972); Uncle Sam's (1972–1980); Sam's (1980–1981)
- Address: 701 First Avenue North
- Location: Minneapolis, Minnesota, U.S.
- Coordinates: 44°58′42″N 93°16′34″W
- Capacity: 1,550 (Main Room); 250 (7th St Entry)
- Events: music, concerts

Construction
- Built: 1937; 89 years ago
- Opened: April 3, 1970; 56 years ago

Website
- www.first-avenue.com

First Avenue and 7th St Entry are two historic music venues housed in the same landmark building in downtown Minneapolis. The nightclub sits on the corner of First Avenue North and 7th Street North, from which the venues get their names. The two are colloquially distinguished by locals as The Mainroom and The Entry.

The building was constructed in 1937 as the Minneapolis depot of the Greyhound Lines bus system and operated for 31 years. Allan Fingerhut purchased the facility in 1970 and converted it into a nightclub. During the 1980s, First Avenue flourished and became a landmark in the music and entertainment industry, playing a seminal role in establishing the '80s funk rock subgenre via the Minneapolis sound, and being the primary local venue for hometown star Prince. Since its rise to fame in the 1980s, First Avenue has hosted many notable local and national music acts. The building is marked by more than 400 large stars on its exterior commemorating these performers, along with other figures notable to the city. While most stars on the building's exterior are silver, Prince's star was surreptitiously repainted with gold leaf by local artist Peyton Scott Russell and a small team in an overnight tribute following the musician's death in 2016. It remains gold to this day.

The venue's history and cultural significance has resulted in local and national recognition. Journalist David Carr wrote in The New York Times that First Avenue's cultural weight and history is matched by only a few clubs in the United States: CBGB, Maxwell's, Metro Chicago and the 9:30 Club. It was also one of the first clubs to book Black performers in Minneapolis's once largely segregated music scene.

The nightclub was featured in Prince's commercially successful 1984 film, Purple Rain.

== History ==
=== Greyhound Lines Facility, opening ===
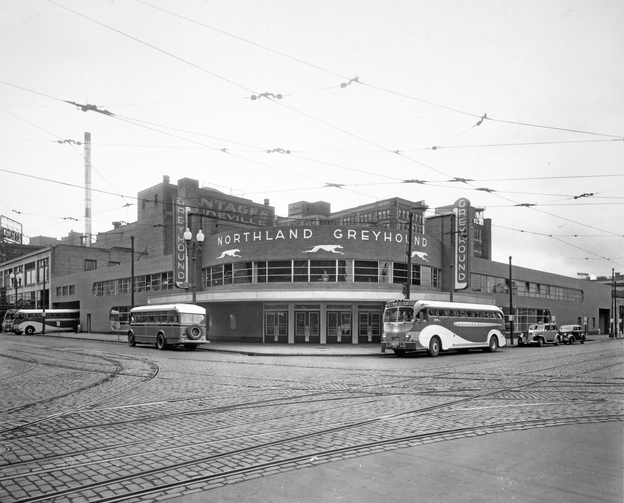
The Minneapolis Greyhound Lines depot was built in the Streamline Moderne style in 1937.

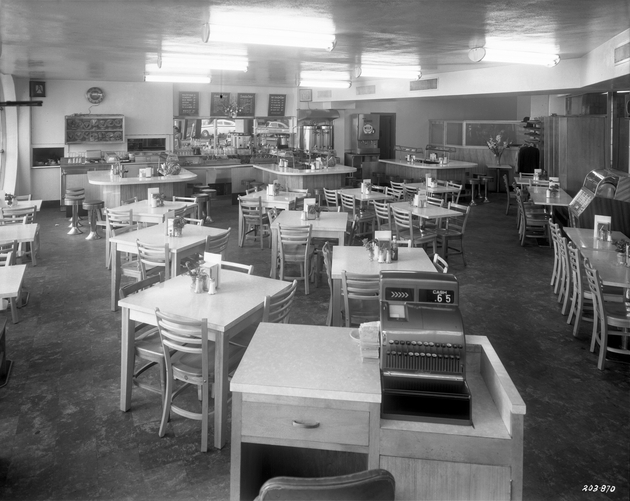
The depot restaurant (pictured in 1951) became a coatroom which became the 7th St. Entry.

The building opened as a bus depot in 1937, decades after Greyhound Lines was founded in Hibbing, Minnesota. It was noted for its Art Deco style and amenities of air conditioning, shower rooms, and public telephones. The interior floor was checkered terrazzo, while the exterior was shiny blue bricks with white trim. The bus station moved to 10th Street in 1968, and moved again to Ramp B near Target Field in 2023.

The transformation from a bus depot into a concert venue has a disputed history. Clearly, Allan Fingerhut, heir to the Fingerhut mail-order merchandise company, had capital and invested $150,000, and Danny Stevens of the band Danny's Reasons had a hard-to-get liquor license. Both men agree promoter Skip Goucher had the original idea for a nightclub in the bus depot.

They opened The Depot on April 3, 1970, with Joe Cocker and Mad Dogs & Englishmen and a stage crowded with 27 musicians and singers who turned in two sets. Among Cocker's Mad Dogs & Englishmen that night were Leon Russell, Rita Coolidge, Claudia Lennear, Jim Keltner, Jim Price and Bobby Keys.

=== Disco era ===
Following two years of steady business, The Depot was faced with a new reality: the public music scene was changing. Psychedelic rock was out and disco was in. In order to stay on top of this new trend, the club needed to change its image. After a short remodel, The Depot in July 1972, evolved into Uncle Sam's, a national franchise of the American Avents Corporation of Cincinnati. A red, white, and blue patriotic-themed club with recorded dance music, a drummer, a DJ, and a light-up plexiglass dance floor became what doorman Richard Luka described as "Studio 54 for the discriminating Kmart shopper." In about late 1973, Steve McClellan (who had become the club's talent buyer and eventually general manager) started working at Uncle Sam's as a bartender. He would enter American Avents' management training in 1975.

After American Avents left in 1979, general manager McClellan hired his former high school classmate Jack Meyers to help him manage money. Dan Lessard managed the bar staff. The club's name was shortened to Sam's in March 1980. The club got its third name change on New Year's Eve 1981 when it became First Avenue.

=== 7th St Entry ===
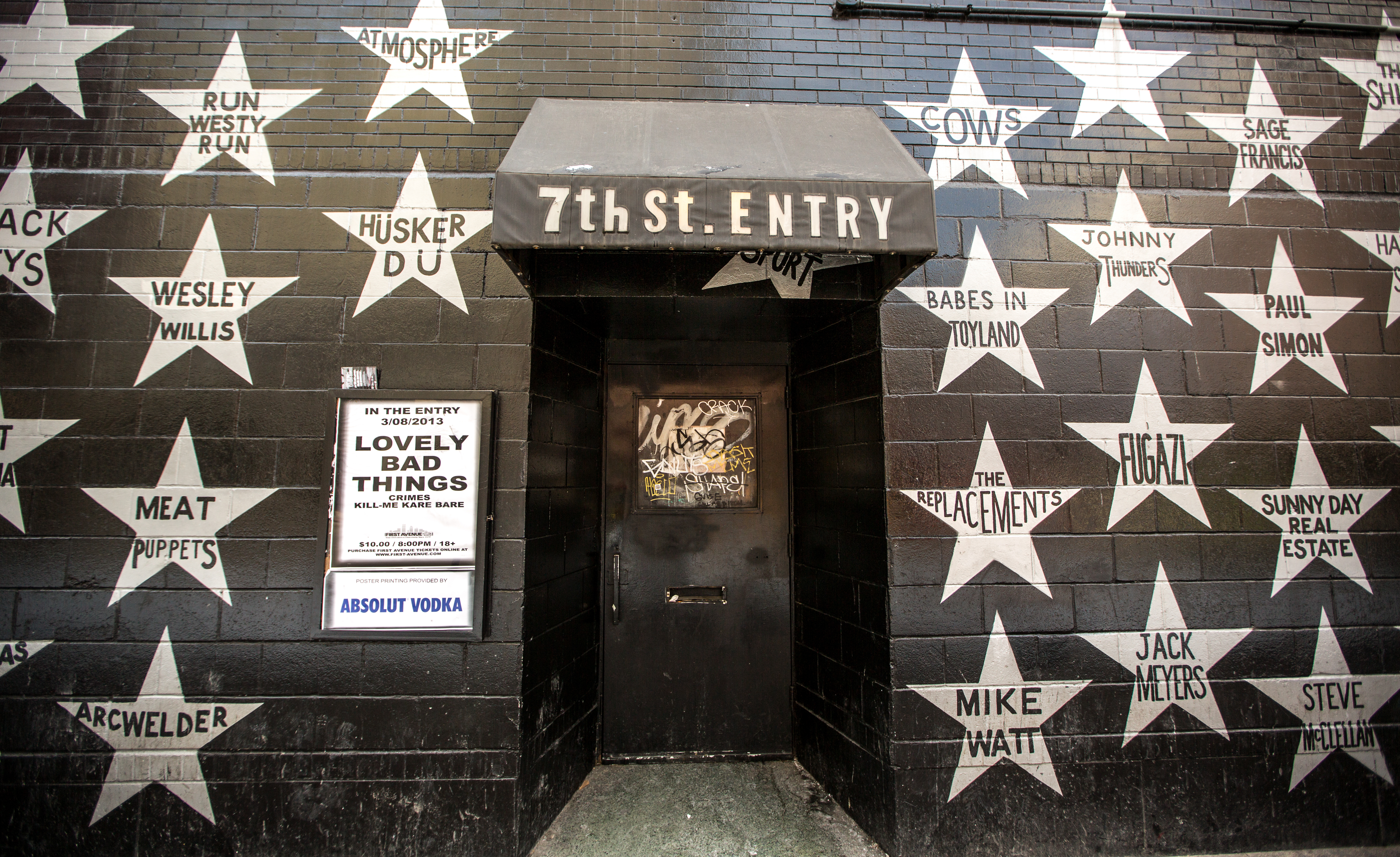
The 7th St Entry

The 7th St Entry is a smaller stage (capacity 250) attached to the historic First Avenue (capacity 1500). This space was once a restaurant (the "Greyhound Cafe") and later a coatroom, before staffer Danny Flies and McClellan spent $1,500 to turn it into a barebones music venue as part of Sam's. Meyers donated his own Bose speakers for stage monitors. Like Jay's Longhorn Bar and Duffy's, the Entry catered to local bands, often too new to play the Mainroom.

The Entry opened its doors on March 21, 1980, with Cathy Mason fronting Wilma & the Wilburs, who were first to play, as warmup for headliner Curtiss A.

=== Danceteria ===
Chrissie Dunlap began to work days in the office in 1979, about the time McClellan booked the Ramones and Pat Benatar in back-to-back, sell out concerts. Disc jockeys Kevin Cole and Roy Freedom developed weekend dance nights dubbed Danceteria inspired by the New York club of that name, often creating enough business to pay the club's bills. The club has, through much of its existence, survived on the success of its dance nights. As EDM and rave culture grew in the 1990s, Cole mentored younger local DJs such as Woody McBride, DJ Apollo (Dory Kahalé) and E-Tones at Danceteria and other DJ nights such as House Nation Under a Groove and Depth Probe, helping to create a thriving and distinctive techno-music scene in the upper Midwest. From 1998 to 2003, the second-level VIP Room hosted the weekly House music night beatopia.

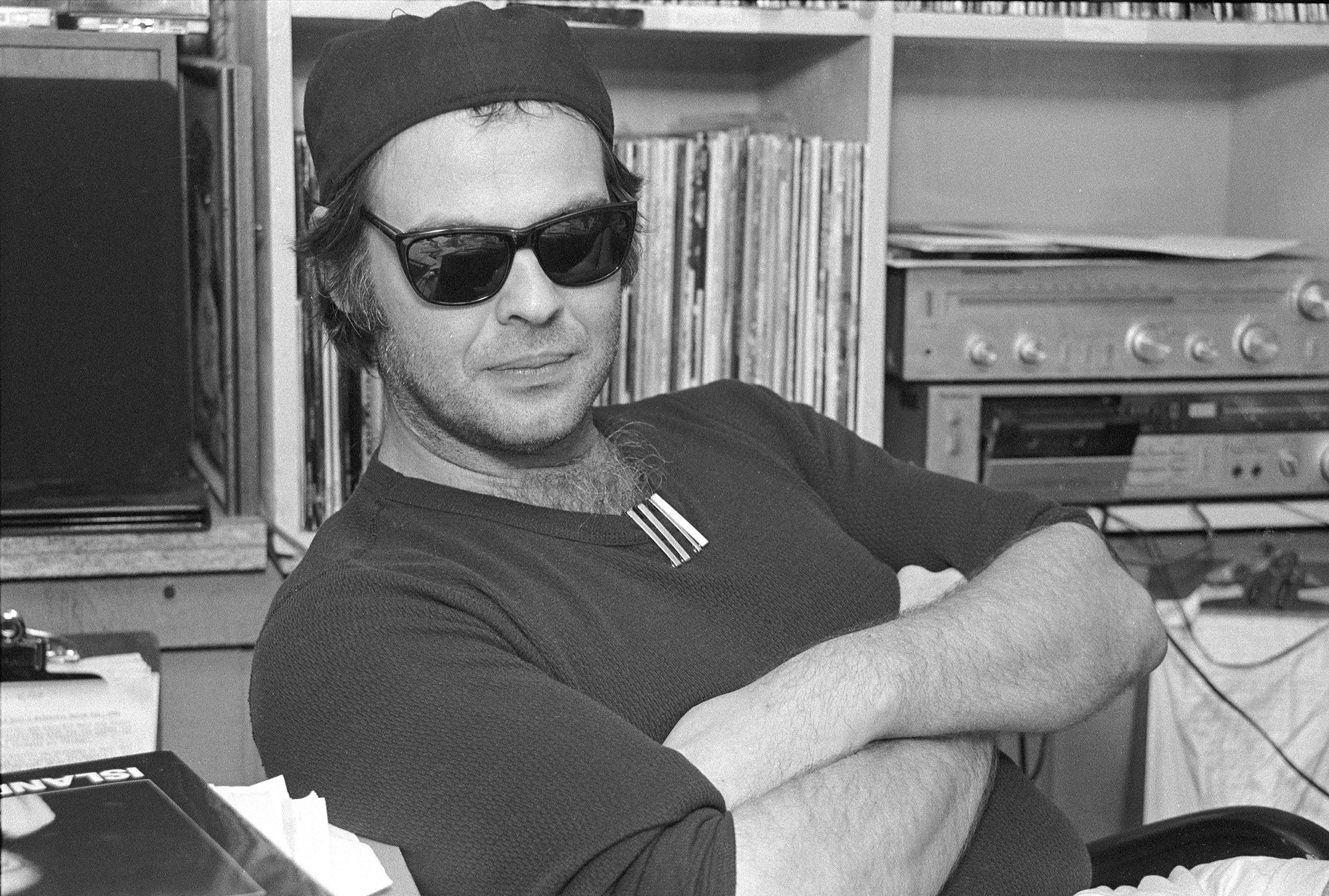
During the era's wild west of settlement with artists, Steve McClellan was known as one of the few reliable promoters in the United States.

=== The Prince explosion ===
Discrimination had created a race barrier in the Minneapolis music scene. Encouraged by Dunlap to write their own material, Jimmy Jam and the 11-piece Mind & Matter were able to break through with bookings by McClellan in the mid-1970s. First booking Black acts in the one-hit wonder Lipps, Inc., with lead singer Cynthia Johnson, McClellan decided to book Prince in 1981, for $2,500 plus part of the gate. Before he died in 2016, Prince was to play nine full First Avenue concerts. Over time, many of his fans thought he owned the club.

Recorded live in 1983 by a Record Plant truck parked outside at an August 1983 show, "Purple Rain" became the title of the film Purple Rain. Prince's management team offered First Avenue $100,000 to use the mainroom for filming in late November into December 1983, with the clause that the Entry would remain open. Most of the club's employees were extras in the film. The production gave the club its patch panel and dimmer packs. McClellan feared the audience had changed from genuine music lovers to a lot of tourists; still, he and Meyers were grateful for the boost in revenue.

=== Changes in ownership ===
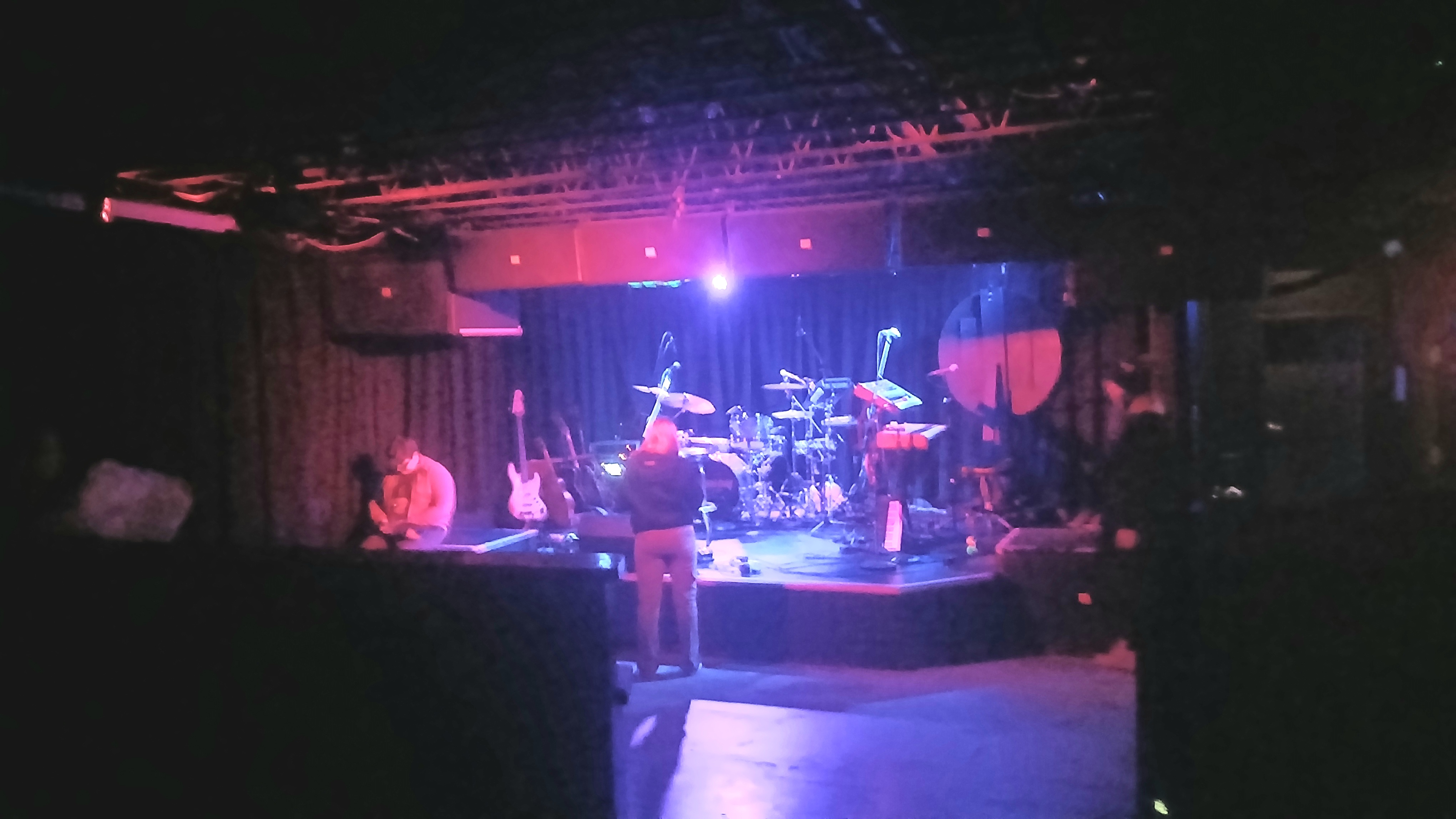
7th St Entry stage in February 2025

The club was briefly closed by Fingerhut in late fall 2004 for financial reasons, causing a wave of protest from music fans. The issues were quickly resolved (the judge presiding in the bankruptcy case noted, "I gather there is some urgency about this"), and the club was reopened by new partners Meyers, McClellan, and former business manager Byron Frank, with shows resuming after one week's closure. An experienced crowd surfer, Minneapolis mayor R.T. Rybak reneged on his promise to stage dive at the first show after reopening.

McClellan ended his 32-year stint at First Avenue in 2005, and began to focus on local music non-profit, the Diverse Emerging Music Organization (or DEMO). After McClellan's departure as general manager, Jack Meyers was appointed to the position and continued until 2009, when Nathan Kranz took over. Dayna Frank took over for her father the same year.

== Notable events ==
The nightclub has been the starting point for many acts that have come out of the Twin Cities, including Prince, The Replacements, Hüsker Dü, Soul Asylum, Semisonic, and Lizzo, among others.

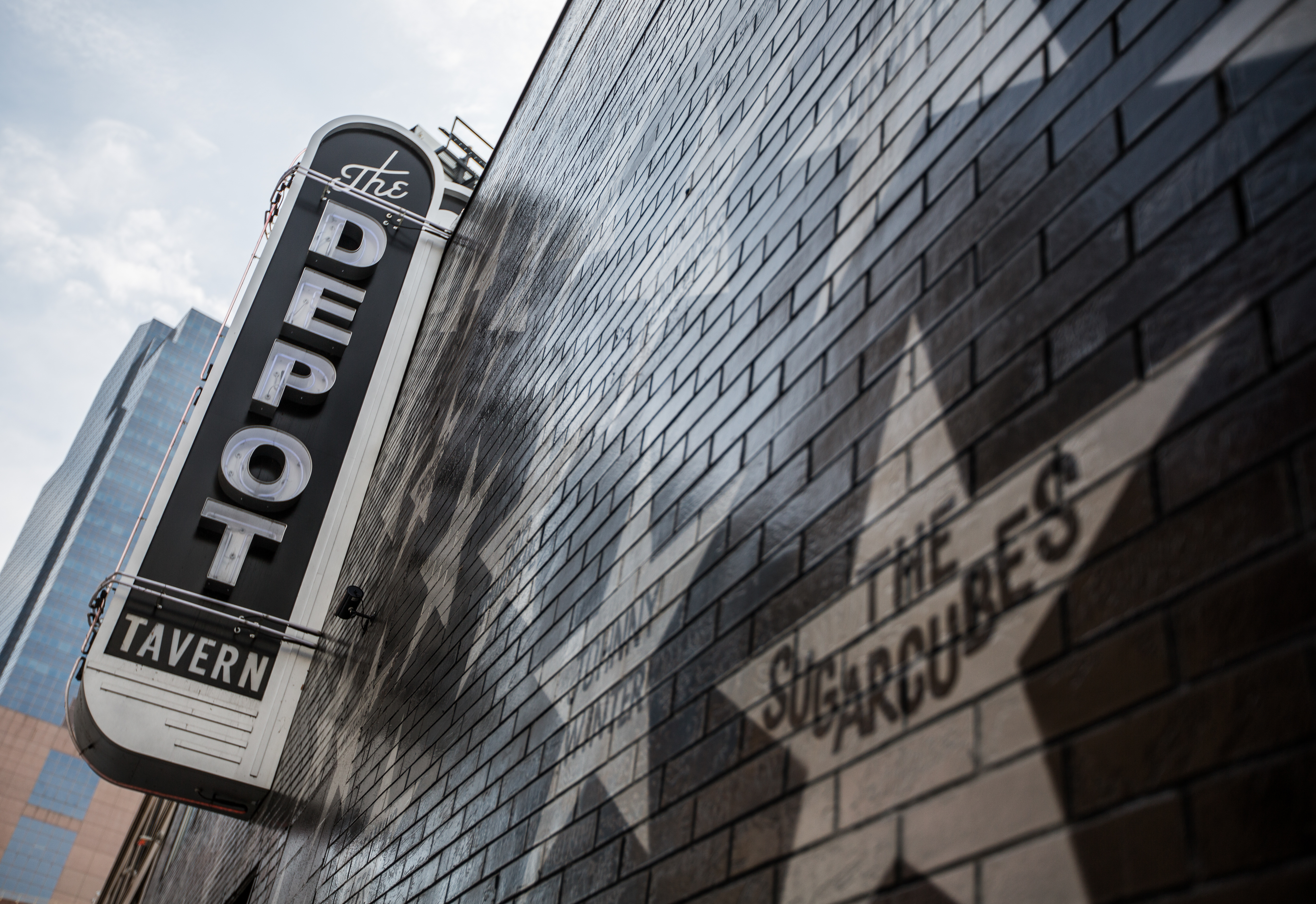
The Depot Tavern opened in 2010 next door to the 7th St Entry. The bar and restaurant has live video feeds from both the Mainroom and the Entry.

Bands and artists have performed at the nightclub and influenced the Minneapolis music scene from 1970 onward, as exemplified by the silver stars that adorn the black building's exterior (every star has the name of an artist who has played at First Avenue or 7th St Entry). First Avenue also appeared in Prince's 1984 film Purple Rain, and many of the film's music performances take place at the venue.

U2 wrote part of October at First Avenue, during sound check.

Grammy Award-winning alternative-country star Lucinda Williams was married on stage following a performance at First Avenue in 2009.

Gwar guitarist Cory Smoot played his last performance at the venue on November 3, 2011—he died just hours afterward.

During the Theory of a Deadman concert on August 12, 2015, part of the ceiling collapsed, pulling down part of the sprinkler pipes. Three people were slightly injured, two of whom were taken to the hospital.

Rage Against the Machine and Bruce Springsteen played an impromptu concert on January 30th, 2026, in protest of Operation Metro Surge. Springsteen performed his tribute, Streets of Minneapolis, live for the first time at this concert.

== Productions ==
In 1970, The Depot recorded the first live album from the venue, titled Gathering at The Depot, featuring artists such as Danny’s Reasons and The Litter.

Daniel Corrigan is a First Avenue photographer since 1981 whose work fills the book Heyday. Later after the advent of ubiquitous digital photography, he became an employee in the facilities department, and made a series of under-two minute videos for the Minnesota Historical Society describing his photos.

Local Minnesota band Trampled by Turtles released their album Live at First Avenue in November 2014.

First Avenue & 7th St Entry published a promotional book in 2000, First Avenue & 7th Street Entry: Your Downtown 'Danceteria' Since 1970. The book was written, edited and designed by Rebecca Noran; and contains information on the history of the club. Furthermore, the club published a magazine entitled First Avenue In House for a brief time from September 1998 to August 2000.

In November 2005, First Avenue released its first compilation CD celebrating 35 years of history. The 16 track CD, Bootlegs Volume 1, is a collection of songs recorded in either the mainroom or the 7th St Entry. Most of the songs on the CD were bootlegged, thus forming the title of the CD. Bootlegs was produced by Karrie Vrabel, with the liner notes written by Steve McClellan. All the proceeds of the CD go to McClellan's non-profit organization, DEMO. The goals of his organization are "to support musicians while promoting gender equity; diversity of music style and genre; diversity of musicians from local communities; careers in all stages of establishment; and the staging of performances with high production values."

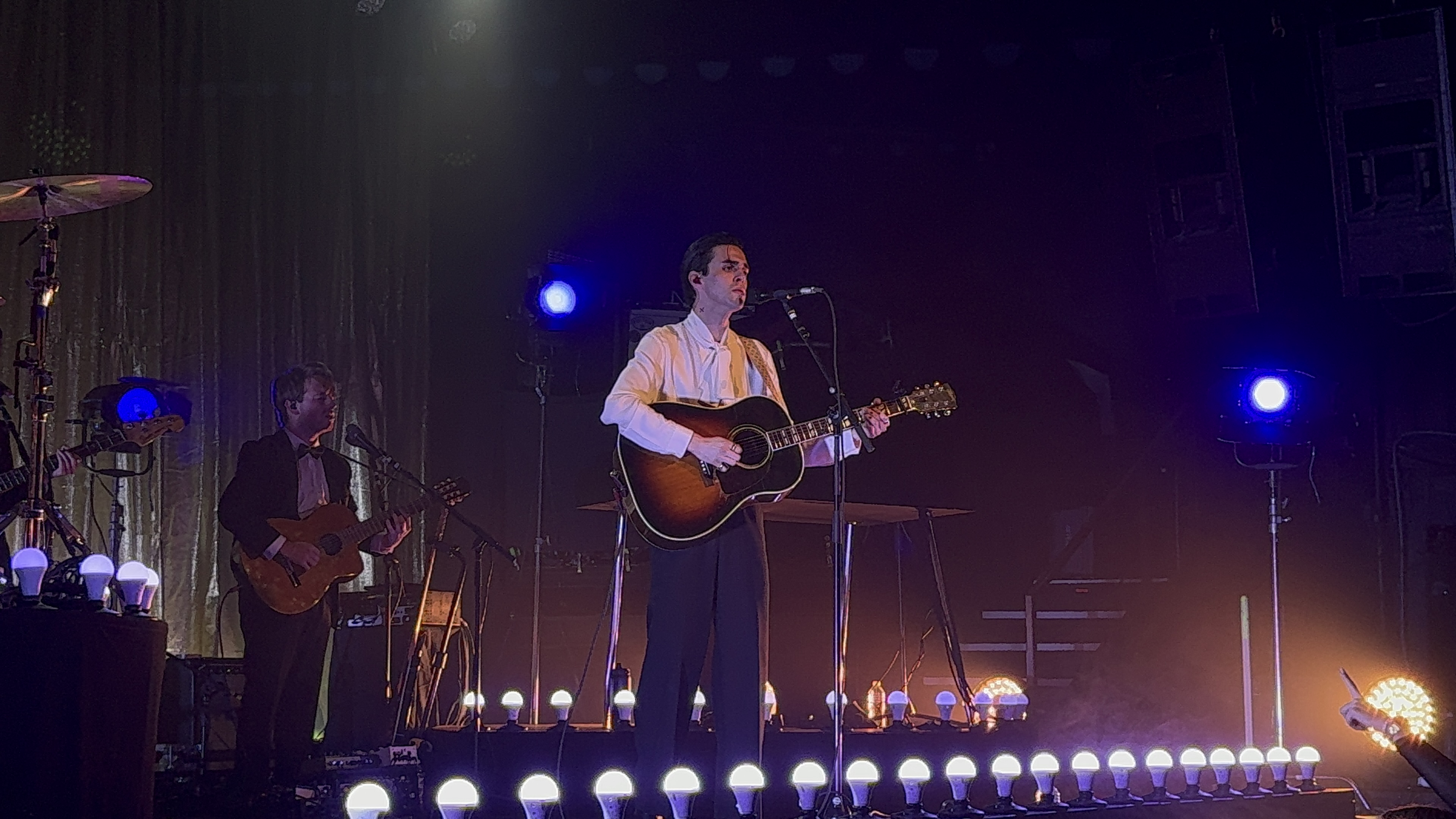
Singer-songwriter Stephen Sanchez performing at First Avenue on October 19, 2023

First Avenue is also home to F1RST Wrestling, a local professional wrestling company currently owned by professional wrestler Arik Cannon. It showcases Minnesota's top wrestling talent and brings in bigger names, including Sean Waltman, Jerry Lynn, Tyler Black, Colt Cabana and others. F1RST Wrestling currently holds its WRESTLEPALOOZA events at First Avenue which feature a combination of pro wrestling, live music and burlesque.

== See also ==
- Hawthorne Transportation Center, successor to the Northland Greyhound bus station

== Bibliography ==
- Riemenschneider, Chris (October 15, 2017). First Avenue: Minnesota's Mainroom. Minnesota Historical Society Press. ISBN 9781681340449.
