= Bo Ramsey =

American singer-songwriter

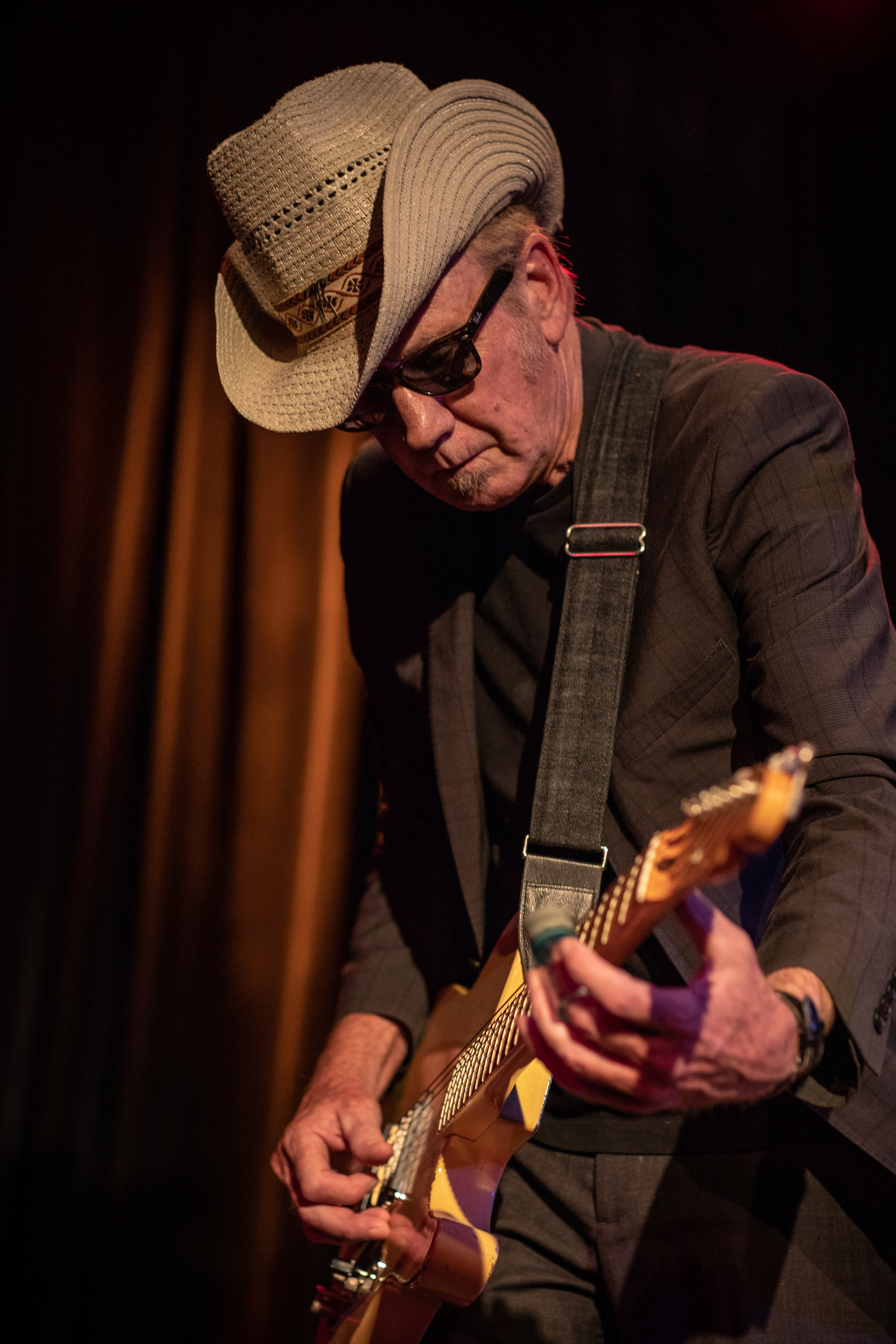

Background information
- Born: Robert Franklin Ramsey; Burlington, Iowa, United States
- Genres: Folk; Rock; Blues
- Instrument: Guitar
- Years active: 1973–present
- Labels: 3rd Street; Lustre
- Website: www.boramsey.com

Bo Ramsey (born Robert Franklin Ramsey in 1951) is an American singer, songwriter, guitarist, and recording producer.

== Career ==
He made his debut in Williamsburg, Iowa in 1973, fronted the Mother Blues Band, and rose to prominence as a soloist when he opened for Lucinda Williams on her 1994 tour. He has produced or played guitar on several of her albums, including Essence, which was nominated for a Grammy Award, and appeared in her band in performances on The Late Show With David Letterman, The Tonight Show with Jay Leno, and Late Night With Conan O’Brien and in Wim Wenders’ "Soul Of A Man" segment for the Blues series of Martin Scorsese.

He has also produced recordings for Joan Baez, David Zollo, Pieta Brown, Iris DeMent, Ani DiFranco, and Kevin Gordon, with whom he co-fronted a band, and worked as a guitarist with the above and with Elvis Costello. He has produced and worked extensively with Greg Brown, including an appearance in 1999 on A Prairie Home Companion, and has been inducted to the Iowa Rock 'n' Roll Hall of Fame and Iowa Blues Hall of Fame.

== Personal life ==
Ramsey's son Benson is also a folk musician, known for performing in duo The Pines.

== Discography ==
=== Solo albums ===
- 1982: Brand New Love (3rd Street)
- 1983: Feelin's Gettin' Stronger (3rd Street) with the Sliders
- 1986: Northwind (3rd Street)
- 1988: Either Way (3rd Street)
- 1991: Down To Bastrop (Shed)
- 1995: Bo Ramsey And The Backsliders (DixieFrog)
- 1997: In The Weeds (Trailer)
- 2007: Stranger Blues (Bo Ramsey Records / Continental Song City)
- 2008: Fragile (Bo Ramsey Records / Continental Song City)
- 2016: Wildwood Calling (Lustre)

=== With Greg Brown (as producer) ===
- 1989: One Big Town (Red House)
- 1990: Down in There (Red House)
- 1992: Dream Café (Red House)
- 1994: The Poet Game (Red House)
- 1996: Further In (Red House)
- 1997: Slant 6 Mind (Red House)
- 2003: If I Had Known: Essential Recordings, 1980-96 (Red House)
- 2004: Honey in the Lion's Head (Trailer)
- 2006: The Evening Call (Red House)
- 2011: Freak Flag (Yep Roc)

=== With Pieta Brown (as producer, guest musician) ===
- 2002: Pieta Brown (Rubric)
- 2005: In The Cool (One Little Indian)
- 2007: Remember the Sun (One Little Indian)
- 2009: Shimmer (Red House)
- 2010: One and All (Red House)
- 2011: Mercury (Red House)
- 2014: Paradise Outlaw (Red House)
- 2017: Postcards (Lustre)

=== With The Pines (as co-producer) ===
- 2004: The Pines (Trailer)
- 2007: Sparrows In The Bell (Red House)
- 2009: Tremolo (Red House)
- 2012: Dark So Gold (Red House)
- 2016: Above The Prairie (Red House)

=== With Lucinda Williams (as guest musician) ===
- 1998: Car Wheels on a Gravel Road (Mercury)
- 2001: Essence (Lost Highway)

=== As producer ===
- 1993: High And Lonesome - Alackaday (Trailer)
- 1998: David Zollo - Uneasy Street (Trailer)
- 1999: Dave Moore - Breaking Down To 3 (Red House)
- 1999: Teddy Morgan - Lost Love & Highways (Hightone / Shout! Factory)
- 2003: Joan Baez - Dark Chords on a Big Guitar (Sanctuary / Kich)
- 2010: Charlie Parr - When The Devil Goes Blind (Nero's Neptune)
- 2010: Ernie Hendrickson - Walking With Angels (self-released)
- 2011: Kelly Pardekooper - Yonder (Leisure Time)
- 2012: Iris DeMent - Sing The Delta (Flariella)
- 2012: Mike Mangione & the Union - Red-Winged Blackbird Man (Rodzinka)
- 2013: Mason Jennings - Always Been (Stats and Brackets)
- 2015: Jeffrey Foucault - Salt as Wolves (Blueblade)

=== As guest artist ===
- 1997: R.B. Morris - ...Take That Ride... (Oh Boy)
- 1998: Kate Campbell - Visions of Plenty (Compass)
- 1999: Mark Stuart - Songs from a Corner Stage (Gearle / E Squared)
- 2000: Ani DiFranco - Swing Set EP (Righteous Babe)
- 2000: Ben Weaver - Living In The Ground (30/30 Industries)
- 2000: Bejae Fleming - Navigating Limbo (Trailer)
- 2000: Larry Long - Well May The World Go (Smithsonian Folkways)
- 2000: Kelly Pardekooper - Johnson County Snow (Leisure Time)
- 2002: David Zollo - The Big Night (Trailer / Rubric)
- 2004: Brother Trucker - Something Simple (Trailer)
- 2004: Iris DeMent - Lifeline (Flariella)
- 2005: Faby - Finally (Megabien)
- 2005: Kevin Gordon - O Come Look at the Burning (Crowville Collective)
- 2005: Johnny Hickman - Palmhenge (Campstove)
- 2006: Jeffrey Foucault - Ghost Repeater (Signature Sounds)
- 2008: Becky Schlegel - For All the World to See (Lilly Ray)
- 2008: Calexico - Carried to Dust (Quarterstick)
- 2015: Iris DeMent - The Trackless Woods (Flariella)

=== As song contributor ===
- 2001: various artists- Labour of Love: The Music of Nick Lowe (Telarc) - track 5, "Where's My Everything?" with Greg Brown
