= Breaking Down to 3 =

Studio album by Dave Moore
- Released: August 17, 1999
- Genre: Folk
- Length: 35:50
- Label: Red House Records
- Producer: Bo Ramsey; Dave Moore

Dave Moore chronology
Over My Shoulder (1990)	Breaking Down to 3 (1999)

Professional ratings
Review scores
Source	Rating
AllMusic	4.5/5 stars
Eclectica	5/5 stars

Breaking Down to 3 is the third album by Dave Moore, released August 17, 1999.

== Critical reception ==
Jeff Burger of AllMusic writes, "Moore displays the rare ability to convey old, universal feelings in new and highly personal ways. He manages to be different and clever without ever lapsing into pretension or cliches."

Chuck Thurman of Monteray County Weekly says, "It's as if the album was created from the deep, ragged breath drawn by a bloodied boxer just before the bell rings for the next round."

Tom Dooley of Eclectica reviews Breaking Down to 3 and writes, "This is the kind of album that transcends the folk genre from which it originates. If you like Dire Straits, Greg Brown, Johnny Cash; if you're into country, rock, blues, or folk; if you like music, I'm betting you'll be blown away by this album." He concludes with, "On a groovy factor scale of one to five, we're talking a five or better here."

Jay Haeske of Back Road Bound concludes his review with, "One of the overlooked gems in the Singer/Songwriter field of the past 15 years, that's for sure."

== Track listing ==
All tracks are written by Dave Moore

No.	Title	Length
1.	"Mr. Music"	4:17
2.	"Sharks Don't Sleep"	2:46
3.	"Midnight"	3:17
4.	"Big Drafty House"	4:12
5.	"Painting This Room"	3:17
6.	"Let's Take Our Time and Do It Right"	2:43
7.	"Magic Dust"	4:20
8.	"Big Fool for You"	3:56
9.	"All the Time in the World"	3:33
10.	"Down to the River"	3:29
Total length:		35:50

== Musicians ==
- Dave Moore – vocals, guitar, harmonica
- Rick Cicalo – acoustic bass, electric bass
- Steve Hayes – drums
- Bo Ramsey – electric guitar, lap steel guitar, vocals
- David Zollo – piano

== Production ==
- Producer – Bo Ramsey, Dave Moore
- Mastering – David Glasser
- Engineer – Brent Sigmeth
- Mixing – Tom Tucker
- Photography – Sandy L. Dyas
- Executive Producer – Bob Feldman

Track listing and credits adapted from AllMusic and verified from the album's liner notes.
