= Dave Moore (singer-songwriter) =

American singer-songwriter

Dave Moore (born Cedar Rapids, IA, July 5, 1951) is a folksinger, songwriter, and multi-instrumentalist who lives in Iowa City, IA. He is accomplished on the guitar, harmonica, button accordion, pan pipes, and more. He performed regularly on A Prairie Home Companion between 1986 and 2014. His ninth album, Breaking Down to 3, was the subject of an interview-feature on NPR’s All Things Considered. In 1985, he won a National Endowment for the Arts grant to study Conjunto accordion with Fred Zimmerle in Texas; he had previously "spent the bulk of the '70s traveling through Latin America and the American South and West, soaking in a wide range of musical influences along the way," and studying with folk musicians in San Cristobal de las Casas and Chiapas.

== Partial Discography: Albums with Red House Records ==
- Jukejoints and Cantinas (rec. 1984; released 1985, Red House Records) with Paul Cunliffe and Dough Thomson
- Over My Shoulder (1990) with Peter Ostroushko, Greg Brown, Radoslav Lorković and others. (named one of the top ten folk albums of 1990 by Pulse Magazine.
- Breaking Down to 3 (1999), with Bo Ramsey, David Zollo and more; No Depression called it "a sublime moving tour-de-force. Moore conjures up some heaven-sent intersection of Don Williams, Harlan Howard and Johnny Cash."

As a sideman he has recorded with many musicians, including Greg Brown (folk musician).
