= Further In =

Album by Greg Brown

Studio album by Greg Brown
- Released: Sep 24, 1996
- Recorded: Pachyderm Studio, Cannon Falls, MN
- Genre: Folk
- Length: 54:01
- Label: Red House
- Producer: Bo Ramsey and Greg Brown

Greg Brown chronology
The Live One (1995)	Further In (1996)	Slant 6 Mind (1997)

Further In is an album by folk singer/guitarist Greg Brown that was released in 1996.

Guests include Kelly Joe Phelps, Dean McGraw and Kate McKenzie.

== Reception ==
Professional ratings
Review scores
Source	Rating
AllMusic	4.5/5 stars
Rolling Stone	4.5/5 stars

Further In is noted for its broad variety of music and lyrics. Greg Brown is noted for his humor, songwriting, storytelling, touring, and his work on NPR's A Prairie Home Companion. A review written for Folk and Acoustic Music Exchange stated that "Further In is an order of magnitude more powerful, more perceptive, and more moving" than Brown's previous album The Poet Game which was at the time considered "the grand opus of his life." The album also received a four star review in Rolling Stone. A review in Dirty Linen described the album as Brown's best since Dream Café and praised the album for the "broad swath in subject matter" covered by the various songs.

Writing for AllMusic, music critic Chris Nickson highly praised Brown and wrote of the album "Wonderfully and sparsely produced by guitarist Bo Ramsey, Further In may be the best outing yet from old-fashioned folkie Brown — which is saying plenty... the introspective Brown seems to deliver his most striking verse, effusive melodies, and heartfelt singing when he's satisfied." Deborah Malarek of No Depression wrote the album "Simplicity has always been a winning technique for Brown, whose gently booming voice commands your full attention."

== Track listing ==
All songs by Greg Brown.

1. "Small Dark Movie" – 3:57
2. "Think About You" – 5:12
3. "Two Little Feet" – 4:48
4. "Hey Baby Hey" – 3:27
5. "China" – 4:16
6. "Where is Maria" – 5:21
7. "If You Don't Get It at Home" – 4:04
8. "You Can Always Come to Me" – 4:11
9. "Someday When We're Both Alone" – 4:09
10. "Not High" – 4:39
11. "Further In" – 4:09
12. "If I Ever Do See You Again" –3:23

== Personnel ==
- Greg Brown – vocals, guitar
- Bo Ramsey – guitar
- Gordon Johnson – bass
- Randy Sabien – mandolin, violin
- Kelly Joe Phelps – lap slide guitar
- Dean Magraw – guitar
- Kate McKenzie – background vocals

=== Production ===
- Produced by Bo Ramsey and Greg Brown
- Engineered and mixed by Tom Tucker
- Mastered by David Glasser
- Photography by Irene Young, Daniel Corrigan, Bob Feldman and Chris Strother
- Paintings by Greg Brown
