= Bathtub Blues =

Studio album by Greg Brown
- Released: February 1, 1994
- Genre: Folk
- Length: 43:57
- Label: Red House
- Producer: Greg Brown, Eric Peltoniemi

Greg Brown chronology
Friend of Mine (1993)	Bathtub Blues (1994)	The Poet Game (1994)

Bathtub Blues is an album by folk singer/guitarist Greg Brown, released in 1993. It is directed towards children and uses a children's chorus on many of the songs.

== Reception ==
Professional ratings
Review scores
Source	Rating
Allmusic	3/5 stars

Writing for Allmusic, music critic Tim Sheridan called the album "As kids' records go, you could do a lot worse..."

== Track listing ==
All songs by Greg Brown except as noted.

1. "I See the Moon" (Public Domain)
2. "Late Night Radio"
3. "Bathtub Blues"
4. "Payday" (Brown, Hurt)
5. "So Long, You Old Tooth"
6. "Green Leaf"
7. "Young Robin"
8. "Down at the Sea Hotel"
9. "Shake Sugaree" (Cotten)
10. "Flabbergabble"
11. "I Remember When"
12. "Four Wet Pigs"
13. "Monsters & Giants"
14. "Two Little Boys" (Public Domain)
15. "You Might as Well Go to Sleep"
16. "I See the Moon" (Public Domain)

== Personnel ==
- Greg Brown – vocals, guitar, harmonica
- Acacia Bjerke – vocals
- Vanessa Bjerke – vocals
- Constie Brown – vocals
- Zoe Brown – vocals
- Amara Hank – vocals
- Karene Hank – vocals
- Pat Donohue – guitar
- Gordon Johnson – bass
