= If I Had Known: Essential Recordings, 1980–96 =

If I Had Known: Essential Recordings, 1980-96

Compilation album by Greg Brown
- Released: Sep 9, 2003
- Genre: Folk
- Label: Red House

Greg Brown chronology
Live at the Black Sheep (2003)	If I Had Known: Essential Recordings, 1980-96 (2003)	Honey in the Lion's Head (2004)

If I Had Known: Essential Recordings, 1980–96 is a two-disc retrospective of music recorded by American folk singer/guitarist Greg Brown.

The seventeen tracks have all been previously released and remastered.

The second disc is a 46-minute limited-edition DVD containing a 1993 documentary on Brown and his music, interviews with Brown, his parents, Garrison Keillor, and others.

== Reception ==
Professional ratings
Review scores
Source	Rating
Allmusic	4.5/5 stars
No Depression	(no rating)

Writing for Allmusic, music critic Jeff Burger wrote of the album "Brown released well over 100 songs on 13 albums during the period covered, and nearly all of those tunes are worth hearing. If you're a fan, you probably already have many of the original CDs... The film should be of great interest to longtime fans and newcomers alike; indeed, it's enough to justify buying this package, even if you already own most or all of the songs on disc one." Russell Hall of No Depression wrote of the album "“Wryly observant, and foregoing the facile introspection that’s the bane of the modern singer-songwriter, Brown is the folk music equivalent of the canary in the coal mine, continually testing the air of contemporary culture. The fact that he’s never succumbed to cynicism testifies to the resiliency of spirit about which he sings as well. Beautifully remastered, and supplemented with a limited edition 1993 DVD documentary, "Hacklebarney Tunes" by Jeffrey Ruoff. If I Had Known is the perfect launching point into the work one of American’s most gifted songwriters."

== Track listing ==
All songs by Greg Brown.

1. "If I Had Known"
2. "Worrisome Years"
3. "Laughing River"
4. "Canned Goods"
5. "Who Would Thunk It?"
6. "The Train Carrying Jimmie Rodgers Home"
7. "Ella Mae"
8. "Our Little Town"
9. "Good Morning Coffee"
10. "Downtown"
11. "You Drive Me Crazy"
12. "Spring Wind"
13. "The Poet Game "
14. "Where is Maria?"
15. "Boomtown"
16. "Two Little Feet"
17. "Driftless"

== Personnel ==
- Greg Brown – vocals, guitar, harmonica
- Bo Ramsey – guitar
- Rick Cicalo – bass
- Pat Donohue – guitar
- Al Murphy – fiddle
- Steve Hayes – drums
- David Hansen – bass
- John Angus Foster – bass
- Robin Adnan Anders – cymbals, tupan, dourbakee
- Rob Arthur – Hammond organ
- Felix James – conga
- Gordon Johnson – bass
- Dave Moore – harmonica, Pan pipes
- Willie Murphy – piano
- Kelly Joe Phelps – slide guitar
- Ron Rohovit – bass
- Prudence Johnson – background vocals
- Dean Magraw – guitar
- Radoslav Lorković – accordion
- Kate McKenzie – background vocals
- Randy Sabien – violin
- Al Souchek – clarinet
- David Williams – mandolin
