= One More Goodnight Kiss =

Studio album by Greg Brown
- Released: 1988
- Genre: Folk
- Length: 58:28
- Label: Red House
- Producer: Greg Brown

Greg Brown chronology
Songs of Innocence and of Experience (1985)	One More Goodnight Kiss (1988)	One Big Town (1989)

One More Goodnight Kiss is an album by American folk musician Greg Brown, released in 1988. This release contains one of Brown's more well-known songs, "Canned Goods", a song dedicated to his grandmother.

== Reception ==
Professional ratings
Review scores
Source	Rating
Allmusic	4/5 stars

Writing for Allmusic, music critic Vik Iyengar called the album "Singer/songwriter Greg Brown delivers his first classic on his fourth studio album, One More Goodnight Kiss, where he uses a keen observer's eye and his acoustic guitar to conjure up vivid images from his idyllic childhood... This is a great introduction to his early catalog and the birth of an important contemporary folk artist."

== Track listing ==
All song by Greg Brown.

1. "One More Goodnight Kiss" – 5:15
2. "Say a Little Prayer" – 3:39
3. "Mississippi Moon" – 4:39
4. "Cheapest Kind" – 5:50
5. "Canned Goods" – 4:08
6. "I Can't Get Used to It" – 4:02
7. "Rooty Toot Toot for the Moon" – 3:33
8. "Walking Down to Casey's" – 5:06
9. "Speed Trap Boogie" – 3:53
10. "Our Little Town" – 3:46
11. "Wash My Eyes" – 2:37
12. "Cronies" – 2:54
13. "It Gets Lonely in a Small Town" – 4:47
14. "I Wish I Was a Painter" – 4:19

== Personnel ==
- Greg Brown – vocals, guitar
- Peter Ostroushko – violin
- Marc Anderson – percussion
- Pat Donohue – guitar
- John Angus Foster – bass
- Dan Lund – guitar
- Radoslav Lorković – keyboards
- Steve Pikal – trombone

== Production ==
- Produced by Greg Brown and Bob Feldman
- Engineered and mixed by Tom Mudge
- Photography by Radoslav Lorković
- Artwork and design by George Ostroushko
