= David Zollo =

American singer-songwriter

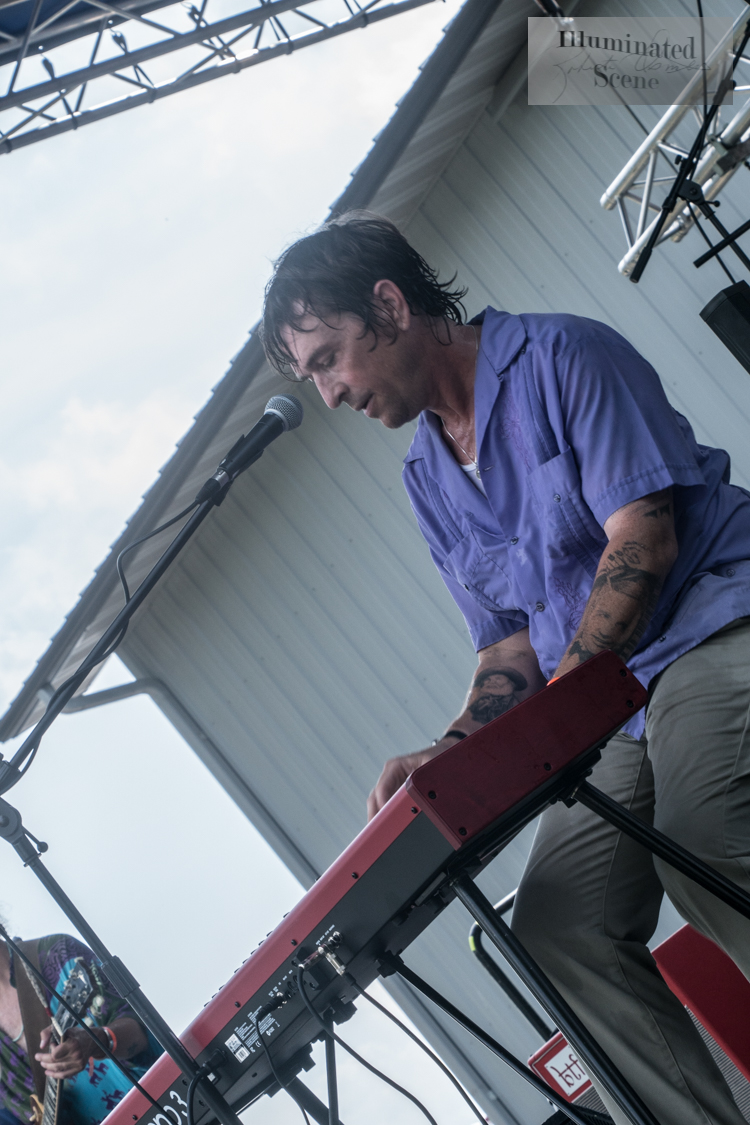

Background information
- Born: August 16, 1969 (age 57); Iowa City, Iowa, U.S.
- Genre: Rock music
- Occupations: Musician, Author
- Instruments: Piano, organ
- Years active: 1992–present
- Label: Trailer Records
- Formerly of: High and Lonesome
- Website: davezollo.com

David Zollo is an American singer, songwriter, author and recording artist who plays piano and organ on his own albums and for other artists.

== Biography ==
=== Early years ===
Iowa native Zollo learned piano at age 4. His grandfather E. Payson Re was a New York jazz pianist. Zollo's music tastes were influenced by his father's extensive collection of vintage American music, and while in his teens he sang rhythm and blues songs for family and friends.

=== High and Lonesome ===
In 1992, Zollo founded the Iowa City pub rock band High and Lonesome (named for a Jimmy Reed song). Members included Zollo, Ruari Fennessy (guitar), Dustin Conner (bass), Darren Mattews (guitar), and Jim Viner (drums). High and Lonesome released three albums on Zollo's Trailer record label: Alackaday, Livefromgabes, and For Sale or Rent, all produced by Zollo and Bo Ramsey.

Though they occasionally play reunion shows, the band dissolved while Zollo recovered from throat surgery. Zollo then formed the band Dave Zollo and the Body Electric.

In 1996, Zollo moved to Nashville, joining Todd Snider's Nervous Wrecks band. When Snider downsized his band in 1997, Zollo returned to Iowa City.

=== Solo career ===
In 1994, Zollo released his first solo album The Morning Is A Long Way From Home, produced by Bo Ramsey.

His 1998 album Uneasy Street began as a High and Lonesome recording, but was released as Zollo's solo album. It featured Ramsey, Andy Carlson (guitar, fiddle), Marty Christensen (bass), and Eric Griffin (bass).

In 2002, Zollo released the album Big Night, on which he wrote all but one song. Helping out were Ramsey, Eric Straumanis (vocals, guitar), Jon Chamberlain (guitar), Chris Winter (guitar), Dale Thomas (steel guitar), Steven Howard (bass), Brad Engeldinger (drums), and Eric Griffin (percussion).

For Hire in 2014 was Zollo's first recording since leaving Trailer Records. The band included Zollo, Howard, Brian Cooper (drums), and Randall Davis (guitars, lap steel guitar).

=== Trailer Records ===
Inspired by the example of local artists' collective Shed Records, Zollo founded and operated Trailer Records from 1994 until 2005. Trailer Records released albums by Greg Brown, Bo Ramsey, High and Lonesome, Pieta Brown, Brother Trucker, and Kelly Pardekooper. In 2005, with Zollo's vocal chords fully recovered, he closed down Trailer Records to focus on touring and recording.

=== Middle Western ===
Zollo met Iowa musician William Elliott Whitmore when Whitmore gave Zollo a demo tape, and sat in with High and Lonesome in 1996. Since then, the two have performed shows together, and Zollo has played on Whitmore's albums.

Zollo and Whitmore formed the band Middle Western in 2016, and planned to record an album. Other members of Middle Western include Stephen Howard (guitar, bass), Stevie Doyle (guitar, bass), and Brian Cooper (drums).

== Discography ==
=== Solo albums ===
- 1994: The Morning Is A Long Way From Home (Trailer)
- 1998: Uneasy Street (Trailer)
- 2001: The Big Night (Trailer)
- 2014: For Hire (self-released)

=== High and Lonesome ===
- 1992: Alackaday (Trailer)
- 1994: Livefromgabes (Trailer)
- 1997: For Sale or Rent (Trailer)

=== For Bo Ramsey ===
- 1997: In the Weeds (Trailer)

=== For Todd Snider ===
- 1998: Viva Satellite (MCA Nashville)
- 2006: Devil You Know (New Door)
- 2008: Peace Queer (Aimless)

=== For Greg Brown ===
- 2014: Over and Under (Rubric)

=== As producer ===
- 2004: Brother Trucker - Something Simple (Trailer)
- 2004: The Pines: The Pines (Trailer)
- 2005: BeJae Fleming - Destination Unimportant (Trailer)

=== Also appears on ===
- 1996: Tom Jessen's Dimestore Outfit - Redemption (Trocadero)
- 1999: Dave Moore - Breaking Down To 3 (Red House)
- 2000: Kelly Pardekooper and the Devil's House Band - Johnson County Snow (Leisure Time)
- 2000: Dick Prall - Somewhere About Here (White Rose)
- 2002: Shoe Money - Misspent Youth (Cowtown)
- 2004: Patrick Brickel - Songs from the Pink Sofa (Trailer)
- 2004: The Pines - The Pines (Trailer)
- 2009: William Elliott Whitmore - Animals in the Dark (ANTI-)
- 2013: FireSale - Mind Breath
- 2013: Cesare Carugi - Pontchartrain (Roots Music Club)
- 2015: William Elliott Whitmore - Radium Death (ANTI-)
- 2021: Hello Clyde - Delay (self-released)
- 2024: Sullivan's Daughter - Snow Miser & Heat Miser Song (Aquitania)
