= Randy Sabien =

American jazz violinist, composer, and educator (born 1956)

- Born: September 26, 1956 (age 69); Fort Bragg, North Carolina, United States
- Genres: Jazz, folk, blues
- Occupations: Musician, record producer, music educator
- Instruments: Violin, mandolin, guitar, piano
- Label: Fiddlehead Music
- Website: randysabien.com

Randy Sabien (/səˈbiːn/; born September 26, 1956) is an American jazz violinist, composer, and music educator known for his live performances and numerous recordings, many of them on Flying Fish Records and Red House Records. At the age of 21 he founded and chaired the Jazz Strings department at Boston's Berklee College of Music and since 2009 has been the chair of the Strings department of McNally Smith College of Music.

== Life and career ==
Sabien was born in North Carolina while his father was in the US Army as a dentist. After his tour of duty, the family settled in Rockford, Illinois. Sabien, originally a drummer, took up the violin to fill a gap in his local youth orchestra and developed his love for jazz after hearing the jazz violinist Stephane Grappelli. Sabien studied classical music at the University of Illinois combined with performing as a country/rock fiddler before enrolling at Berklee College of Music in 1977. The following year, at age 21, he founded and chaired Berklee's Jazz Strings department. He left Berklee after three years to record and tour, eventually settling in Hayward, Wisconsin.

In the early 1980s he performed with and produced three albums for folk singer-songwriter, Jim Post and founded the Randy Sabien Jazz Quintet. He went on to provide violin, mandolin, guitar and piano accompaniment for many other American singer/songwriters as well as recording his own albums. His first solo album with the Randy Sabien Jazz Quintet, In a Fog, was released in 1983 on Flying Fish Records, and later re-released on Fiddlehead Music, the label he founded in 1989. His most recent solo album Rhythm and Bows was released in late 2007. May 1980 marked the first of Sabien's several appearances over the next 25 years on Garrison Keillor's radio series A Prairie Home Companion where he played in the show's The Guy's All-Star Shoe Band. His concert with the Fiddlehead Band at the Grand Theater in Wausau, Wisconsin was broadcast on Wisconsin Public Television in 2012 as was a thirty-minute background feature, On the Road: Randy Sabien & Mike Dowling with Sabien and Dowling performing "Long Tall Mama" in an "impromptu acoustic jam".

Since the 1980s Sabien has combined performing and composing with conducting workshops for schools, music camps, and youth orchestras. His educational video and jazz clinic Jazz: What it is was released in 1990. He has also co-authored with Bob Philips, the text book and teachers' manual series Jazz Philharmonic: Making jazz easy in the string orchestra. (Alfred Publishing Co., 2000). In 2009 he was appointed chair of the Strings department of McNally Smith College of Music. He continues to perform both as a guest soloist and with his Fiddlehead Band.

== Discography ==
=== Solo artist ===
- 1983 In a Fog, Flying Fish Records
- 1989 Fiddlehead Blues, Fiddlehead Music
- 1991 The Sound of Fish Dreaming, Fiddlehead Music
- 1993 Paintin' the Canvas, Fiddlehead Music
- 1997 Live at the Cafe Carpe with Mike Dowling, Fiddlehead Music
- 2002 Segue with Brian Orff, Fiddlehead Music
- 2000s Cap a Cup of Dreams with Kevin McMullin, Fiddlehead Music
- 2004 Rock This House, Fiddlehead Music
- 2005 Randy Sabien Live, Quantum Leap Records
- 2008 Rhythm and Bows, Fiddlehead Music
- 2014 Soul of a Man, Fiddlehead Music
- 2017 Meet Me Under The Mistletoe, Fiddlehead Music

=== Guest artist ===
- 1979 Bela Fleck: Crossing The Tracks, Rounder Select
- 1981 Emery Christiansen: Between Planes, Mountain Railroad
- 1985 Greg Brown: In the Dark with You, Red House Records
- 1987 Jim Post: Jim Post & Friends, Flying Fish
- 1988 Bela Fleck: Daybreak, Rounder Records
- 1990 Free Hot Lunch: Eat This, Flying Fish
- 1991 Jim Post: Learn Not To Burn, National Fire Protection Music
- 1992 Jan Marra: These Crazy Years, Flying Fish
- 1996 Greg Brown: Further In, Red House Records
- 1998 Peter Buffett: Wisconsin: An American Portrait, Don't Records
- 2000 The Kate Wolf Anthology Weaver of Visions, Rhino Records
- 2000 Mike Dowling: String Crazy, Wind River Records/Orchard
- 2000 Arthur & Friends: Arthur's Perfect Christmas, Rounder Records
- 2001 Catfish Keith, Jitterbug Swing, Fish Tail Records/ Orchard
- 2001 Catfish Keith: Pepper in My Show, Fish Tall Records/ Orchard
- 2001 John Altenburgh: A Wisconsin Christmas, Orchard/Sony
- 2003 Greg Brown If I Had Known: Essential Recordings, 1980–96 Red House Records
- 2004 Jim Kansas: Jimmy and The Swingers JK Records
- 2005 Corky Siegel's Traveling Chamber Blues Show!, Alligator Records
- 2007 Mick Sterling: Between Saturday Night and Sunday Morning, Calvin
- 2007 David Levin: Criminal, Day Eleven Records
- 2007 Randy Peterson: Picture Day!, Randy Peterson Music
- 2007 Garrison Keillor: Dusty and Lefty: The Lives of the Cowboys, High Bridge Audio
- 2007 Ernie Hedrickson: Down The Road, Ernie Hedrickson Music
- 2007 John Altenburgh: A Wisconsin Christmas "A Return To The Grand", Altenburgh Records
- 2008 2007–2008 String and Full Orchestra, Alfred Music Publishing
- 2009 Peter Mulvey: Letters From a Flying Machine, Signature
- 2010 2009–2010 String and Full Orchestra, Alfred Music Publishing
- 2010 Music and The Creative Mind, FEMA Honors Orchestra, Mark Records
- 2012 Connie Evingson: Sweet Happy Life, Minnehaha Music
- 2012 Peter Mulvey: Good Stuff, CRS
- 2012 Kevin Bowe & The Okemah Prophets: Natchez Trace, Okemah Records
- 2013 Ian Callanan: In Beauty We Walk, GIA Publications
- 2013 Jack McNally: Take Time, Jack McNally Records

=== DVD ===
- 1986/2005 Randy Sabien Live in Minneapolis
