= One Big Town =

Studio album by Greg Brown
- Released: 1989
- Genre: Folk
- Length: 40:34
- Label: Red House
- Producer: Greg Brown, Bo Ramsey

Greg Brown chronology
One More Goodnight Kiss (1988)	One Big Town (1989)	Down in There (1990)

One Big Town is an album by American folk singer/guitarist Greg Brown, released in 1989.

== History ==
It is Brown's first in a long association with Bo Ramsey as producer and instrumentalist. In an interview with Roy Kasten for No Depression magazine, Brown said of Ramsey: "We had met a long time before we played together; we both had bands in town, late '70s or early '80s. We talked a little, Bo had some idea that we should do something. He had heard one of my records and said he thought it really needed work... Bo has really taught me to enjoy the studio. Nine-tenths of what we do is live, but it's a different approach; it's relaxed and thoughtful. I never really thought of making a record before then."

== Reception ==
Professional ratings
Review scores
Source	Rating
AllMusic	3.5/5 stars
Rolling Stone	4/5 stars

AllMusic's William Ruhlman wrote: "One Big Town is not a subtle album by any means, but it is an impassioned one, even if you worry that its creator might be ready to quit the music business and retire to some remote farm by the end of it."

== Track listing ==
All song by Greg Brown.

1. "The Way They Get Themselves Up" – 2:15
2. "The Monkey" – 4:26
3. "One Cool Remove" – 3:01
4. "Back Home Again" – 3:58
5. "Just Live" – 3:17
6. "One Big Town" – 6:14
7. "Lotsa Kindsa Money" – 3:58
8. "Things Go On" – 4:40
9. "America Will Eat You" – 4:56
10. "Tell Me It's Gonna Be Alright" – 3:49

== Personnel ==
- Greg Brown – vocals, guitar
- Bo Ramsey – guitar, background vocals
- Bob Thompson – saxophone
- Radoslav Lorković – keyboards, background vocals
- Rick Cicalo – bass
- Steve Hayes – drums

== Production ==
- Produced by Greg Brown and Bo Ramsey
- Engineered by Tom Tatman
- Mixed by Tom Tucker
- Photography by Laurel Cazin
