= In the Hills of California =

Live album by Greg Brown
- Released: Sep 7, 2004
- Genre: Folk
- Label: Red House
- Producer: Cloud Moss

Greg Brown chronology
Honey in the Lion's Head (2004)	In the Hills of California (2004)	The Evening Call (2006)

In the Hills of California is a live album by folk singer/guitarist Greg Brown, released in 2004.

== History ==
This live album is subtitled Live from the Kate Wolf Music Festival 1997-2003. All proceeds from this release were donated to charity. Eight of the tracks are previously unreleased and were taken from performances at the annual festival over the years.

Guests include Nina Gerber, Shawn Colvin, and Garnet Rogers.

== Reception ==
Professional ratings
Review scores
Source	Rating
Allmusic	3.5/5 stars
No Depression	(no rating)

Music critic Jeff Burger praised the release in his Allmusic review, writing Brown "remains a national treasure, and so does his songwriting, which has gone from great to better over the years. Wisely keeping the production simple and his voice upfront on this release, he unveils some of his best songs about love, life, friendship, dreams, and the American scene." Jim Musser of No Depression wrote "Greg Brown has the rare gift of creating songs that unwind with the roundabout informality of a thoughtful yet unstructured conversation. Regardless of how much work may or may not have gone into a particular tune’s genesis, the resulting piece feels of-the-moment, complete with interjections and sparky, synaptic sidebars."

== Track listing ==
All songs by Greg Brown except as noted.

1. "For All" (Snyder)
2. "Wash My Eyes"
3. "Never So Far"
4. "The Way My Baby Calls My Name"
5. "Spring and All"
6. "Slow Food"
7. "Inabell Sale"
8. "Tequila and Me" (Wolf)
9. "China"
10. "Introduction to Kate's Guitar"
11. "Kate's Guitar"
12. "Say a Little Prayer"
13. "You Really Got a Hold On Me" (Robinson)
14. "I Want My Country Back"
15. "I Shall Not Be Moved" (Traditional)
16. "Two Little Feet"
17. "Introduction to Lord I Have a Place in My Heart"
18. " Lord I Have a Place in My Heart"
19. "Poet Game"
20. "Think About You"
21. "Where is Maria"
22. "Lullaby"
23. "Almost Out of Gas"
24. "Livin' On a Prayer"
25. "Introduction to Mose Allison Played Here"
26. "Mose Allison Played Here"
27. "Rexroth's Daughter"
28. "Vivid"
29. "Kind Hearted Woman Blues" (Johnson)
30. "Just By Myself"
31. "Your Town Now"
32. "Don't Let Me Down" (Lennon–McCartney)

== Personnel ==
- Greg Brown – vocals, guitar
- Shawn Colvin – vocals
- Nina Gerber – guitar, slide guitar
- Bill Griffin – mandolin
- Dave Moore – harmonica
- Garnet Rogers – guitar
- Karen Savoca – percussion
