= Over and Under =

Studio album by Greg Brown
- Released: 2000
- Recorded: March 28 and 29, 2000
- Genre: Folk
- Length: 47:54
- Label: Trailer Records
- Producer: Greg Brown

Greg Brown chronology
Slant 6 Mind (1997)	Over and Under (2000)	Covenant (2000)

Over and Under is an album by folk singer/guitarist Greg Brown, released in 2000 on the Trailer Records label, a brief departure from his normal Red House Records label.

The album stemmed from Brown's desire of assembling an all-star band of Eastern Iowa musicians to make a rustic, “back-porch” record. All the songs were written in the three days following the Covenant sessions.

== Reception ==
Professional ratings
Review scores
Source	Rating
Allmusic	(no rating)
PopMatters	(Top 10 of 2000)
No Depression	(no rating)

Music critic Jeff Burger praised the release in his Allmusic review, writing "...this is mostly terrific stuff. Brown's gravelly vocals are as good as ever, and so are his songs, which range from playful and silly to poignant and powerful." Jim Musser of No Depression described the album as "From touching (”Dear Wrinkled Face”) to “touched” (the perverse graveside huckstering of “Ina Bell Sale”), the homeys kick up sparks in a diverse, provocative set that corrals significant elements of the region’s [Iowa] mythos and ethos."

John Kenyon added Over and Under (and Covenant) to his list of the Top 10 of 2000, writing "Brown shows his raunchy side, growling through rockers and ravers, never losing his keen eye for detail or his lyrical dexterity."

== Track listing ==
All songs by Greg Brown except as noted.

1. "River Will Take You" – 3:31
2. "Mattie Price" – 4:44
3. "Summer Evening" – 3:41
4. "Why Do You Even Say That" – 3:52
5. "Shit Out of Luck" – 2:23
6. "Beyond the Sunset" (Traditional) – 4:06
7. "Fairfield" – 2:51
8. "Almost Out of Gas" – 2:34
9. "Betty Ann" – 3:41
10. "857-5413" – 2:44
11. "Your Town Now" – 3:56
12. "Dear Wrinkled Face" – 3:04
13. "Inabell Sale" – 4:08
14. "Like a Dog" – 2:59

== Personnel ==
- Greg Brown – vocals, guitar
- Bob Black – banjo, lap steel guitar
- Steve Hayes – drums, percussion
- Dave Moore – harmonica, button accordion
- David Zollo – piano
- Bo Ramsey – guitar
- Al Murphy – fiddle, mandolin
