= Night Train (Bill Morrissey album) =

Studio album by Bill Morrissey
- Released: 1993
- Genre: Folk
- Label: Philo
- Producer: Ellen Karas

Bill Morrissey chronology
Friend of Mine (1993)	Night Train (1993)	You'll Never Get to Heaven (1996)

Night Train is an album by the American musician Bill Morrissey, released in 1993. Morrissey promoted the album with a North American tour that included shows with Cheryl Wheeler.

== Production ==
The album was produced by Ellen Karas. Morrissey's lyrics were inspired more by fiction writers than by other songwriters; he wrote the album in four weeks. David Johansen sang on "Love Arrives". Duke Levine played guitar on the album; Billy Conway and Johnny Cunningham played drums and violin, respectively.

"Birches" is about a longtime married couple. "Sandy" examines organized religion. "Letter from Heaven" describes humorous encounters in heaven with famous deceased musicians, including Robert Johnson and Dizzy Gillespie.

== Critical reception ==
Professional ratings
Review scores
Source	Rating
AllMusic	4.5/5 stars
The Encyclopedia of Popular Music	4/5 stars
Entertainment Weekly	A
MusicHound Folk: The Essential Album Guide	4/5 stars
Orlando Sentinel	4/5 stars
Pittsburgh Post-Gazette	4/4 stars
The Republican	2.5/5 stars
Rolling Stone	4/5 stars

Entertainment Weekly wrote: "Morrissey’s creaky voice is the perfect instrument to tell these proud losers’ tales. Put simply, he is the best folk songwriter working today." Rolling Stone stated that "Morrissey's songs capture the stark, hardscrabble milieus of a subterranean New England culture—rootless drifters, despondent cabbies, beery, down-on-their-luck deckhands." The Atlanta Journal-Constitution concluded that Morrissey's "small stories focus on the subtle truths glanced between the observed subject and the subject observing."

The Colorado Springs Gazette-Telegraph determined that, "unlike the '70s sensitive men (Jackson Browne, James Taylor), who wore out their welcome by whining about messed-up relationships, Morrissey and his peers ... seem to address their male inadequacies with at least a snicker of humor"; the paper listed the album among the 20 best of 1993. The Chicago Tribune noted that "Morrissey's characters are inevitably middle-aged, crumbling around the edges, and yet, somehow, dealing with it."

AllMusic wrote that "the sound on this album is more stripped down, as basic as a Lou Reed record and just as effective."

== Track listing ==
No.	Title	Length
1.	"Night Train"
2.	"Sandy"
3.	"Birches"
4.	"Cold, Cold Night"
5.	"Letter from Heaven"
6.	"Ellen's Tune"
7.	"So Many Things"
8.	"Love Arrives"
9.	"Blues in the Morning"
10.	"Broken Waltz Time"
11.	"Walk Down These Streets"
12.	"Time to Go Home"
