= Songs of Innocence and of Experience (Greg Brown album) =

Studio album by Greg Brown
- Released: 1986
- Genre: Folk
- Length: 42:20
- Label: Red House
- Producer: Greg Brown and Bob Feldman

Greg Brown chronology
In the Dark with You (1985)	Songs of Innocence and of Experience (1986)	One More Goodnight Kiss (1988)

Songs of Innocence and of Experience is an album by folk singer/guitarist Greg Brown, released in 1986. Brown sets the poetry of William Blake (see Songs of Innocence and of Experience) to music.

== Reception ==
Professional ratings
Review scores
Source	Rating
Allmusic	3/5 stars

Writing for Allmusic, music critic Tim Sheridan called the album "Some of the tunes are outstanding, such as the easy lines of "Lamb," while some poems refuse to adjust to Brown's melodic structures. However, it is an effort to be commended."

== Track listing ==
All song by Greg Brown.

1. "Introduction" – 2:40
2. "The Lamb" – 2:54
3. "Infant Joy" – 2:02
4. "The Chimney Sweeper" – 4:54
5. "The Echoing Green" – 2:57
6. "Night" – 4:06
7. "On Another's Sorrow" – 2:15
8. "The Tyger" – 3:23
9. "The Angel" – 2:13
10. "The Garden of Love" – 0:47
11. "Infant Sorrow" – 1:33
12. "Holy Thursday" – 2:47
13. "Ah! Sun-Flower" – 2:27
14. "The Little Vagabond" – 2:55
15. "A Poison Tree" – 2:30
16. "London" – 3:08

== Personnel ==
- Greg Brown – vocals, guitar
- Michael Doucet – violin
- Angus Foster – bass
- Peter Ostroushko – mandolin, violin
- Dave Moore – harmonica, accordion, pan flute, button accordion, pan pipes

== Production ==
- Produced by Greg Brown and Bob Feldman
- Engineered and mixed by Scott Rivard
