= The Live One =

Live album by Greg Brown
- Released: Oct 11, 1995
- Recorded: June 1994
- Genre: Folk
- Length: 69:24
- Label: Red House
- Producer: Greg Brown

Greg Brown chronology
The Poet Game (1994)	The Live One (1995)	Further In (1996)

The Live One is the title of a live album by folk singer/guitarist Greg Brown. It was recorded at JR's Warehouse, Traverse City, Michigan in June 1994.

== Reception ==
Professional ratings
Review scores
Source	Rating
Allmusic	4/5 stars

Writing for Allmusic, music critic Richard Meyer wrote of the album "This is very informal recording with bits of tuning and chit-chat. The songs, of course, carry the day."

== Track listing ==
All songs by Greg Brown except as noted.

1. "Just by Myself" – 6:49
2. "Billy from the Hills" – 6:18
3. "Boomtown" – 3:04
4. "Spring Wind" – 4:20
5. "Laughing River" – 6:22
6. "You Drive Me Crazy" – 4:41
7. "Canned Goods" – 13:47
8. "I Don't Want to Have a Nice Day" – 3:28
9. "Brand New '64 Dodge" – 3:04
10. "1952 Vincent Black Lightning" (Richard Thompson) – 5:16
11. "One More Goodnight Kiss" – 4:53
12. "Moondance" (Van Morrison) – 7:22

== Personnel ==
- Greg Brown – vocals, guitar
- Gary Worden – percussion (on "Moondance")
