= In the Dark with You =

In the Dark With You

Studio album by Greg Brown
- Released: 1985
- Recorded: Carriage House Studio, Minneapolis, MN
- Genre: Folk
- Length: 49:47
- Label: Red House
- Producer: Greg Brown, Bob Feldman

Greg Brown chronology
One Night (1983)	In the Dark With You (1985)	Songs of Innocence and of Experience (1986)

In the Dark With You is an album by folk singer/guitarist Greg Brown, released in 1985.

== Reception ==
Professional ratings
Review scores
Source	Rating
Allmusic	3/5 stars

Writing for Allmusic, music critic William Ruhlman called the album "Humorous and sardonic reflections on domestic life and aging, from a journeyman folksinger."

== Track listing ==
All song by Greg Brown.

1. "Who Woulda Thunk It" – 4:33
2. "In the Dark with You" – 3:41
3. "Help Me Make It Through This Funky Day" – 4:07
4. "I Slept All Night by My Lover" – 3:19
5. "Where Do the Wild Geese Go" – 3:06
6. "Good Morning Coffee" – 2:58
7. "All the Money's Gone" – 4:58
8. "Letters from Europe" – 4:31
9. "Just a Bum" – 4:12
10. "Who Do You Think You're Fooling" – 5:53
11. "People With Bad Luck" – 4:06
12. "In the Water" – 4:23

== Personnel ==
- Greg Brown – vocals, guitar
- John Angus Foster – bass
- Randy Sabien – mandolin, violin
- Felix James – conga
- Prudence Johnson – background vocals
- Dave Moore – harmonica, button accordion, pan pipes

== Production ==
- Produced by Greg Brown and Bob Feldman
- Engineered and mixed by Tom Mudge and Tom Tucker
