= One Night (Greg Brown album) =

Live album by Greg Brown
- Released: 1983
- Recorded: October 8–9, 1982
- Genre: Folk
- Label: Coffehouse Extemporé Records

Greg Brown chronology
The Iowa Waltz (1981)	One Night (1983)	In the Dark with You (1985)

One Night is an album by folk singer/guitarist Greg Brown. It was re-released on CD by Red House Records.

It was during this concert at the Minneapolis folk club Coffeehouse Extempore that Red House Records founder Bob Feldman heard and met Greg Brown. He later reissued Brown's first two albums. The CD reissue of One Night adds five songs from the same show.

== Reception ==
Professional ratings
Review scores
Source	Rating
Allmusic	4.5/5 stars
No Depression	(no rating)

Writing for Allmusic, music critic Jeff Burger wrote of the album "The album finds Brown's talent in full bloom. The warmth, humor, deft phrasing, and compelling lyrics that his later albums display are all here. Brown was already a great storyteller, a fine observer of the human condition, and a folk singer to be reckoned with. If you like his later recordings, this is a very safe purchase. And if you're new to Brown, it's as good a place to start as any." Jim Musser of No Depression wrote of the album "Longtime Brown followers will, no doubt, rejoice at the availability of this glimpse of the nascent artist, just as relative newcomers may find its occasional shtick, devotion to folk conventions and more generic subject matter a bit off-putting. In either case, the listener gets not only a fine folk outing, but a benchmark from which to measure the dramatic evolution of Brown’s development as a singer, writer and musician."

== Track listing ==
1. "Dream On"
2. "Canned Goods"
3. "Every Street in Town"
4. "Flat Stuff"
5. "Downtown"
6. "Heart of My Country" (CD bonus track)
7. "Butane Lighter Blues" (CD bonus track)
8. "Banjo Moon" (CD bonus track)
9. "Waiting"
10. "Ships" (CD bonus track)
11. "You Don't Really Get Me, Babe"
12. "On Records the Sound Just Fades Away"
13. "Love Is a Chain"
14. "Ella Mae"
15. "All the Little Places around the Town" (CD bonus track)
16. "Never Shine Sun"

== Personnel ==
- Greg Brown - vocals, guitar
