= Musictech =

Musictech may refer to:

- MusicTech, a magazine and website published by BandLab Technologies
- McNally Smith College of Music, formerly known as Musictech College
