= Down in There =

Studio album by Greg Brown
- Released: 1990
- Genre: Folk
- Length: 42.29
- Label: Red House
- Producer: Bo Ramsey, Greg Brown

Greg Brown chronology
One Big Town (1989)	Down in There (1990)	Dream Café (1992)

Down in There is an album by American folk singer/guitarist Greg Brown, released in 1990.

== Reception ==
Professional ratings
Review scores
Source	Rating
Allmusic	3/5 stars

Writing for Allmusic, music critic Jason Ankeny wrote of the album "... Brown proves himself an able songwriter as well as a singer... While the majority of the album's songs are ballads leaning toward spare folk and country, "Poor Backslider" fits snugly into a Southern rock groove, while "If I Had Known" lopes along like an old rockabilly shuffle; all serve Brown's broken-in baritone wonderfully."

== Track listing ==
All songs by Greg Brown

1. "If I Had Known" – 3:23
2. "Hillbilly Girl" – 4:15
3. "A Little Place in the Country" – 5:45
4. "Worrisome Years" – 4:08
5. "Hacklebarney Tune" – 3:56
6. "Poor Backslider" – 4:08
7. "Fooled Me Once" – 6:13
8. "Band of Gold" – 4:01
9. "All Day Rain" – 3:22
10. "You Are a Flower" – 3:42

== Personnel ==
- Greg Brown – vocals, guitar
- Bo Ramsey – guitar, background vocals
- Bill Cagley – banjo
- Al Murphy – fiddle
- Radoslav Lorković – piano, accordion
- Angus Foster – bass
- Steve Hayes – drums
- Shawn Colvin – background vocals

== Production ==
- Produced by Bo Ramsey and Greg Brown
- Engineered by Tom Tucker
- Mixed by John Scherf
- Photography by Marc Moberg
- Design by Linda Beauvais
