= Reynold Philipsek =

American guitarist and singer-songwriter

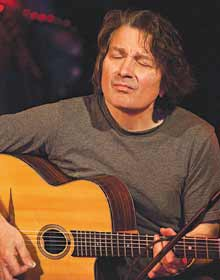
- March 2012

Background information
- Born: Reynold David Philipsek; December 8, 1952 (age 73); Richmond, Minnesota
- Genres: Pop, rock, gypsy jazz
- Occupation: Musician
- Instrument: Guitar
- Years active: 1967–present
- Label: Rephi
- Website: reynold.com

Reynold David Philipsek (born December 8, 1952) is an American guitarist, singer, songwriter, and poet.

== Career ==
Philipsek began playing guitar at the age of 9 and joined the American Federation of Musicians labor union at the age of 14 (1967). At the age of 16, he wrote and recorded the single "Oval Portrait" with the band Cure of Ares. The song received enough mid-west regional radio airplay to garner an invitation to perform on the ABC Television show The Happening '69. From 1969 through 1971, Cure of Ares toured extensively throughout the midwest and recorded a second single called Sunshine.

At the age of 18, Philipsek was exposed, through a radio broadcast, to gypsy jazz performed by Django Reinhardt. This proved to be a pivotal experience. At the age of 22 (1975), Philipsek received a private lesson and attended two workshops from jazz guitarist Joe Pass. During this same time period, he studied jazz guitar and The Complete Johnny Smith Approach to Guitar with Mike Elliott, a protégé of Johnny Smith. These experiences cemented Philipsek's lifelong interest in jazz. After leaving Cure of Ares, he played in bands in the midwest. In the 1990s he founded the band Reynold's Remarkable Rhythm Cattle and recorded the albums Uptown and Country (1990), What's Inside? (1991), and Memory Lane (1992). Beginning in 1989, Philipsek became primarily a solo act recording albums in pop, rock, jazz, and gypsy jazz on his label, Rephi Records.

In the spring of 1980, Philipsek was diagnosed with testicular cancer. The diagnosis was particularly frightening for Philipsek as, at the time, treatments had not reached high survival rates. After undergoing chemotherapy for six months, he was declared free of the cancer.

In 2005, Philipsek celebrated twenty-five years of a life free of cancer. He donated part of his earnings from the album 25 to the American Cancer Society. With that album, he began to concentrate on gypsy jazz. All the Things You Are (2010) and Tales from the North Woods (2011), include elements of gypsy jazz, bebop, Latin folk, modal jazz, and Slavic folk music informed by Philipsek's burgeoning interest in his Czech and Polish heritage. He has appeared at gypsy jazz festivals, jazz clubs, and concert venues including theGrand Marais Jazz Festival, Twin Cities Hot Summer Jazz Festival, Cedar Cultural Center, Dakota Jazz Club, and Artists' Quarter. He has worked with the bands East Side and Sidewalk Cafe.

In 1984, Philipsek wrote the score for the children's short film. St. Cloud Sleep. In 1999 his book of poetry Journey to the Middle Ages was published. The DVD Three Piece Suite/Munsinger Gardens was released in 2005 followed by Live at The Times recorded with the Twin Cities Hot Club and the documentary A Life Well Played in 2016.

== Awards and honors ==
Philipsek regularly receives press coverage from traditional print and online outlets such as the StarTribune, vita.mn, Vintage Guitar, Acoustic Guitar, MinnPost and International Musician. Philipsek appears regularly on television and radio — both as a solo performer and with his collaborative efforts — including KARE 11 Showcase Minnesota (Minneapolis/St. Paul, MN), WFMU (New York, NY), and Minnesota Public Radio (Minneapolis/St. Paul, MN).

Philipsek's work as a guitarist has been reviewed in Guitar Player, Acoustic Guitar, Vintage Guitar, Billboard and Downbeat, where Philipsek received a four star review at the age of 22. He was chosen a Guitar Player Magazine Jazz Poll nominee for six consecutive years (1975 to 1980) and has been nominated for five Minnesota Music Awards. He has worked with Connie Evingson and Dorado Schmitt. He has been a guitar instructor for twenty-five years and has provided instruction to more than 2,700 students.

== Discography ==
- Deepwater (White Noise, 1977)
- Short Stories (Zino, 1980)
- Black and Blue (Rephi, 1985)
- Reynold (Rephi, 1993)
- Global Home Movie (Rephi, 1994)
- House of Curiosities (Rephi, 1996)
- First Hundred Years (Rephi, 1996)
- Fool's Paradise (Rephi, 2000)
- Grey Chalet (Rephi, 2003)
- 25 (Rephi, 2005)
- Bistro (Rephi, 2005)
- Artifacts & Curiosities (Rephi, 2007)
- What It Is (Rephi, 2007)
- Long Ago Far Away (Rephi, 2007)
- Tales from the North Woods (Rephi, 2011)
