= 44 & 66 =

Studio album by Greg Brown
- Released: 1980
- Genre: Folk
- Length: 40:42
- Label: Rose Alley Records (1980 original), Red House Records (1984 re-issue)
- Producer: Greg Brown. (Original Producers Wayne Glover and Dennis Jones.)

Greg Brown chronology
Hacklebarney (1974)	44 & 66 (1980)	The Iowa Waltz (1981)

44 & 66 is an album by folk singer/guitarist Greg Brown. It was released in 1980 on Rose Alley Records. It was re-issued in 1984 on Red House Records, the second release by the newly formed label.

== Reception ==
Professional ratings
Review scores
Source	Rating
Allmusic	2.5/5 stars

Writing for Allmusic, music critic Jeff Schwachter wrote the album "is a moodier album than Iowa Waltz, and Brown's songwriting takes a sharper turn into wider topical spaces and shows traces of the talents that would become developed to a fuller extent on his following release... This is an early album from one of the most enduring careers in contemporary songwriting and should not be overlooked."

== Track listing ==
All tracks are written by Greg Brown.

No.	Title	Length
1.	"44 and 66"	4:05
2.	"Don't You Think Too Much"	5:34
3.	"Bozo's in Love Again"	3:31
4.	"Twenty or So"	3:42
5.	"Ring Around the Moon"	3:45
6.	"Downtown"	4:33
7.	"People Hide Their Love"	4:08
8.	"Lullaby at the Edge of Town"	3:16
9.	"Early"	3:31
10.	"Beatniks Gonna Rise Again"	3:57

== Personnel ==
- Greg Brown – vocals, guitar
- Chuck Henderson – guitar
- Dave Moore – harmonica
- Ron Rohovit – bass
- Al Soucek – clarinet
- Prudence Johnson – background vocals
- Gary Delaney – mandolin

== Production ==
- Produced by Greg Brown. (Original Producers Wayne Glover And Dennis Jones.)
- Engineered and mixed by Tom Tucker
- Photography by Dom Franco and Steve Zardony
- Layout Design by James Ochs
