= Slant 6 Mind =

Studio album by Greg Brown
- Released: Oct 21, 1997
- Genre: Folk
- Length: 54:01
- Label: Red House
- Producer: Bo Ramsey and Greg Brown

Greg Brown chronology
Further In (1996)	Slant 6 Mind (1997)	Over and Under (2000)

Slant 6 Mind is the title of the fourteenth principal album release by American folk singer/guitarist Greg Brown, released in 1997.

At the Grammy Awards of 1998, Slant 6 Mind was nominated for the Grammy Award for Best Traditional Folk Album.

== Reception ==
Professional ratings
Review scores
Source	Rating
Allmusic	4/5 stars

Writing for Allmusic, music critic Jeff Burger wrote of the album "For the most part, this 14th album is business as usual for Greg Brown, which is very good news indeed... Suffice it to say that once you've heard Brown's voice, you won't forget it. And while Brown once claimed he could sing Hank Williams songs with even more passion than he delivers his own, this terrific album makes a more passionate performance hard to imagine."

== Track listing ==
All songs by Greg Brown.

1. "Whatever It Was" – 4:49
2. "Loneliness House" – 4:24
3. "Mose Allison Played Here" – 3:45
4. "Spring & All" – 3:15
5. "Vivid" – 3:15
6. "Dusty Woods" – 5:57
7. "Billy From the Hills" – 5:00
8. "Speaking in Tongues" – 4:33
9. "Enough" – 4:38
10. "Hurt So Nice" – 2:13
11. "Wild Like a Sonny Boy" – 3:41
12. "Down at the Mill" – 4:08
13. "Why Don't You Just Go Home" –4:23

== Personnel ==
- Greg Brown – vocals, guitar
- Bo Ramsey – guitar, slide guitar, harmony vocals
- Bob Black – banjo
- Paul Griffith – drums
- Dave Moore – harmonica
- Al Murphy – fiddle
- Kelly Joe Phelps – guitar, vocals, harmony vocals, lap steel guitar
- Gordon Johnson – bass

== Production ==
- Produced by Bo Ramsey and Greg Brown
- Engineered and mixed by Tom Tucker
- Mastered by Bernie Grundman
- Photography by Jim Herrington
