= Dream Café =

Studio album by Greg Brown
- Released: 1992
- Genre: Folk
- Length: 50:42
- Label: Red House
- Producer: Bo Ramsey

Greg Brown chronology
Down in There (1990)	Dream Café (1992)	Friend of Mine (1993)

Dream Café is an album by American folk singer/guitarist Greg Brown, released in 1992. It was produced by Bo Ramsey. It is a Red House release.

== Reception ==
Professional ratings
Review scores
Source	Rating
Allmusic	3/5 stars
Entertainment Weekly	B

Music critic David Freedlander praised the release in his Allmusic review, writing "...Brown produces an album as light and refreshing as a summer breeze. Although it is plagued by the inconsistency which characterizes most of his studio work, some of his most heartfelt and enduring songs can be found on this album..." Bill Wyman of Entertainment Weekly wrote "... on Dream Café he's more varied musically — he'll do a grinding blues and even flirt with jazz. Also, he wields simpler but more forceful melodies, and is still very capable of pulling off a marvelous portrait, as in the moving Spring Wind."

== Track listing ==
All songs by Greg Brown.

1. "Just by Myself" – 4:45
2. "Sleeper" – 4:28
3. "I Don't Know That Guy" – 4:51
4. "So Hard" – 2:38
5. "You Can Watch Me" – 3:37
6. "Dream Cafe" – 5:55
7. "You Drive Me Crazy" – 4:56
8. "Spring Wind" – 4:32
9. "Nice When it Rains" – 3:10
10. "Laughing River" – 4:16
11. "No Place Away" – 4:10
12. "I Don't Want to Be the One" – 3:24

== Personnel ==
- Greg Brown – vocals, guitar, harmonica
- Bo Ramsey – guitar
- Tim Sparks – requinto
- Robin Adnan Anders – percussion, tabla, tupan, dourbakee
- Gordon Johnson – bass
- Dan Lund – guitar
- Kate McKenzie – background vocals
- Willie Murphy – piano, organ

== Production ==
- Produced by Bo Ramsey
- Engineered by Tom Tucker
- Mixed by Bob Feldman
