= Hi Fly (Rio Nido album) =

Studio album by Rio Nido
- Released: 1985
- Length: 34:16
- Label: Red House
- Producer: Dave Karr and Rio Nido

Rio Nido chronology
I Like to Riff (1978)	Hi Fly (1985)	Voicings (1986)

Hi Fly was the second recording by the Minneapolis jazz vocal group Rio Nido and was released in 1985. The group changed from a trio to a quartet with the departure of Tom Lieberman and the addition of Roger Hernandez and Dave Maslow. With this release, Rio Nido focused on the vocalese style. The original LP was long out-of-print until being re-released on CD in 2007 by the Japanese label Bittersweet America.

== Track listing ==
1. "That's the Way to Treat Your Woman" (Eddie Vinson and Charles Taylor) arr. by Rio Nido
2. "The Crawl" (Mickey Tucker, lyrics by Tim Sparks and Willie Murphy) arr. by Slide Hampton
3. "You Don't Know What Love Is" (Raye-De Paul) arr. by Slide Hampton
4. "60 Minute Man" (Dominoes) arr. by Rio Nido
5. "A Night in Tunisia" (Dizzy Gillespie and Frank Papareill, lyrics by Jon Hendricks) arr. and additional lyrics by Rio Nido
6. "The Cool One" (Benny Goodman, lyrics by Mary Jo Knox) arr. based on Jazztet
7. "Oblivion" (Bud Powell, lyrics by Jim Nance) arr. by Rio Nido
8. "Hi-Fly" (Randy Weston, lyrics by Jon Hendricks) arr. and additional lyrics by Rio Nido

== Personnel ==
- Prudence Johnson - vocals
- Tim Sparks - vocals, guitar
- Roger Hernandez - vocals, drums
- Dave Maslow - vocals, bass
- Dave Karr - sax, flute
- Jimmy Hamilton - piano

== Production notes ==
- Produced by David Karr and Rio Nido
- Engineered by Dick Hedlund
- Mastered by Miles Wilkinson
- Photography by Ann Marsden
- Logo and album design by John Hanson
