= Covenant (Greg Brown album) =

Studio album by Greg Brown
- Released: Aug 8, 2000
- Recorded: Pachyderm Studio, Cannon Falls, MN
- Genre: Folk
- Length: 51:25
- Label: Red House
- Producer: Bo Ramsey

Greg Brown chronology
Over and Under (2000)	Covenant (2000)	Down in the Valley: Barn Aid Benefit Concert (2001)

Covenant is an album by American folk singer/guitarist Greg Brown, released in 2000. It was released only a few months after Over and Under.

"Rexroth's Daughter" was later covered by Joan Baez on her album called Dark Chords on a Big Guitar.

After the album's official end there is a "hidden" track titled "Marriage Chant".

== Reception ==
Professional ratings
Review scores
Source	Rating
Allmusic	4.5/5 stars
Folk and Acoustic Music Exchange	(no rating)
PopMatters	(Top 10 of 2000)
No Depression	(no rating)

Music critic Jeff Burger praised the release in his Allmusic review, writing Brown "remains a national treasure, and so does his songwriting, which has gone from great to better over the years. Wisely keeping the production simple and his voice upfront on this release, he unveils some of his best songs about love, life, friendship, dreams, and the American scene." Jim Musser of No Depression called Brown "a remarkable artist whose peak powers apparently reside somewhere between the present and the next time out."

John Kenyon added Covenant (and Over and Under) to his list of the Top 10 of 2000, writing "A parochial pick, to be sure, but that doesn’t lessen its value. Brown is a buried treasure of sorts... he sings about both the loss of and search for love on songs that are the most accomplished of his career." Writing for Folk and Acoustic Music Exchange, Moshe Benarroch highly praised the first two songs, "'Cept You and Me, Babe", and "Rexwroth's Daughter", but dismissed the rest of the album, writing "with song after song we get just second-rate 60's and 70's songs. Although these are all original songs, they sound like covers of any rhythm and blues band from that period... a mediocre album that will appeal more to convinced fans than to newcomers."

== Track listing ==
All songs by Greg Brown.

1. "'Cept You and Me Babe" – 4:32
2. "Rexroth's Daughter" – 4:55
3. "Real Good Friend" – 3:55
4. "Blues Go Walking" – 3:19
5. "Waiting on You" – 4:28
6. "Living in a Prayer" – 3:45
7. "Dream City" – 4:12
8. "Lullaby" – 4:20
9. "Blue Car" – 4:11
10. "Walkin' Daddy" – 4:45
11. "Pretty One More Time" – 5:14

== Personnel ==
- Greg Brown – vocals, guitar
- Bo Ramsey – guitar
- Dave Jacques – acoustic bass, electric bass
- Rob Arthur – organ, Wurlitzer piano
- Steve Hayes – drums, percussion
- Eric Heywood – pedal steel guitar
