= Milk of the Moon =

Studio album by Greg Brown
- Released: May 12, 2002
- Genre: Folk
- Length: 51:43
- Label: Red House
- Producer: Greg Brown, Pete Heitzman

Greg Brown chronology
Down in the Valley: Barn Aid Benefit Concert (2001)	Milk of the Moon (2002)	Live at the Black Sheep (2003)

Milk of the Moon is an album by American folk singer/guitarist Greg Brown, released in 2002. It peaked at #48 on the 2002 Billboard Top Independent Albums charts.

== Reception ==
Professional ratings
Review scores
Source	Rating
Acoustic Guitar	no rating
All Things Considered	no rating
Allmusic	4/5 stars
PopMatters	no rating
No Depression	no rating

Writing for Allmusic, music critic Chris Nickson highly praised Brown and wrote of the album "Brown doesn't so much tell stories as suggest them, letting them work their way into the imagination. And in that way, he's a master, an American icon." David Cantwell of No Depression wrote the album "finds Brown further developing his art in a rare but welcome direction... Brown’s rugged and arresting baritone, his every careful word, matters all the more."

Music critic Nicole Solis wrote for Acoustic Guitar "Brown considers his role as a musician to bring people together, and his evocative songs explore the range of emotion found in human interaction. He lovingly recounts tales of loneliness, memories of a father and son, and true love, then lays bare the earthy and occasionally darker side of relationships." John Kreicbergs of Popmatters wrote "Brown’s gift for weaving delicate melodies and biting lyrics with his characteristically rich baritone has never sounded better..."

== Track listing ==
All songs by Greg Brown.

1. "Lull It By" – 4:04
2. "A Little Excited" – 3:10
3. "Let Me Be Your Gigolo" – 4:00
4. "Smell of Coffee" – 3:53
5. "Milk of the Moon" – 5:49
6. "Mud" – 3:59
7. "Ashamed of Our Love" – 3:33
8. "Steady Love" – 4:40
9. "The Moon Is Nearly Full" – 5:29
10. "Telling Stories" – 4:20
11. "Never So Far" – 4:56
12. "Oh You" –3:50

== Personnel ==
- Greg Brown – vocals, guitar, baritone guitar
- Pete Heitzman – guitar, slide guitar, baritone guitar
- Jimmy Johns – drums
- Karen Savoca – percussion, Clavinet, background vocals
- Tom "T-Bone" Wolk – organ, accordion, bass, upright bass
