= Inside (Bill Morrissey album) =

Studio album by Bill Morrissey
- Released: 1992
- Recorded: August 12–22, 1991
- Genre: Folk music
- Length: 41:15
- Label: Philo

Bill Morrissey chronology
Standing Eight (1989)	Inside (1992)	Friend of Mine (1993)

Inside is the fourth album by New England singer-songwriter Bill Morrissey, released in 1992 on Philo Records.

== Critical reception ==
Professional ratings
Review scores
Source	Rating
AllMusic	3/5 stars
Chicago Tribune	3.5/4 stars
Entertainment Weekly	A
People	(favorable)
The Rolling Stone Album Guide	3.5/5 stars
The Village Voice	(choice cut)

Alex Henderson described Inside as "not perfect but consistently enjoyable" and gave it a rating of three stars out of five. Stephen Holden wrote in 1992 that Inside was Morrissey's best-sounding record, and it is described as "probably his best effort" in the Encyclopedia of Popular Music.

== Track listing ==
1. Inside (duet with Suzanne Vega)
2. Everybody Warned Me
3. Offwhite
4. Gambler's Blues
5. Long Gone
6. Man From Out of Town
7. Rite of Spring
8. Robert Johnson
9. Hang Me, Oh Hang Me
10. Chameleon Blues
11. Sister Jo
12. Casey, Illinois

== Personnel ==
- Bill Morrissey—vocals, guitar
- Johnny Cunningham—violin
- Tom McClung—piano
- Ron Levy—organ
- Doug Plavin—drums
- John Jennings—lead guitar on "Robert Johnson"
- Greg Brown—vocal harmony on "Hang Me, Oh Hang Me"
