= I Like to Riff =

Studio album by Rio Nido
- Released: 1978
- Label: Shadow Records
- Producer: Rio Nido, Charlie Campbell, Doug Ackerman

Rio Nido chronology
I Like to Riff (1978)	Hi Fly (1985)

I Like to Riff was the first recording by the Minneapolis jazz vocal trio Rio Nido, released in 1978. The original LP was long out-of-print until re-released on CD in 2007 by the Japanese label, Bittersweet America.

== Track listing ==
1. "Minnie the Moocher's Wedding Day" (Harold Arlen, Ted Koehler) (From a Cab Calloway Cotton Club revue. Arrangement by Connie Boswell and The Boswell Sisters - 1932)
2. "The Trouble With Me is You" (Pinky Tomlin and Harold Tobias) (From a recording of the Nat King Cole Trio - 1941)
3. "In Walked Bud" (Thelonious Monk, lyrics by Jon Hendricks)
4. "Hannah in Savannah" (Grace Leroy Kahn) (From a recording of Al Jolson's last USO tour)
5. "Wacky Dust" (Oscar Levant and Stanley Adams) (Adapted from a recording of the Chick Webb Orchestra with Ella Fitzgerald - 1938. Additional lyrics by Sparks, Lieberman, and Tim Gadban.)
6. "Gone" (Austin Powell) (Recorded by The Cats and the Fiddle - 1941) Horn arrangement by Tim Sparks
7. "I Like to Riff" (Nat King Cole)
8. "Shanghai Lil" (Harry Warren and Al Dubin)) (Introduced by James Cagney in the Busby Berkeley film '"Footlight Parade" - 1933)
9. "Most Gentlemen Don't Like Love" (Cole Porter) (From the 1938 Broadway musical "Leave it to Me")
10. "The Man With the Jive" (Stuff Smith) (From a recording by Stuff Smith and His Onyx Club Orchestra - 1938.) Horn arrangement by Tim Sparks
11. "Crazy People" ("Ragtime" Jimmy Monaco and Edgar Leslie) (Arrangement by Connee Boswell and The Boswell Sisters, featured in "The Big Broadcast of 1932")

== Personnel ==
- Prudence Johnson - vocals
- Tim Sparks - vocals, guitar
- Tom Lieberman - vocals, guitar
- Eddie Berger - alto sax, baritone sax, soprano sax, clarinet
- Butch Thompson - clarinet
- Jim Price - fiddle
- Hearn Gadbois - conga
- Willie Murphy - bass
- Gary Raynor - bass
- Steve Benson - bass sax
- Peter Ostroushko - mandolin

== Production notes ==
- Produced by Rio Nido
- Executive producer - Charlie Campbell
- Technical assistant - Tim Ackerman
- Engineered and mixed by Dave Ray, Chris Hinding and Michael McKern
- Artwork by John Hanson
- Photography by Matt Spector and Dennis Widstrand
