= McNally Smith College of Music =

Defunct American music college in Minnesota

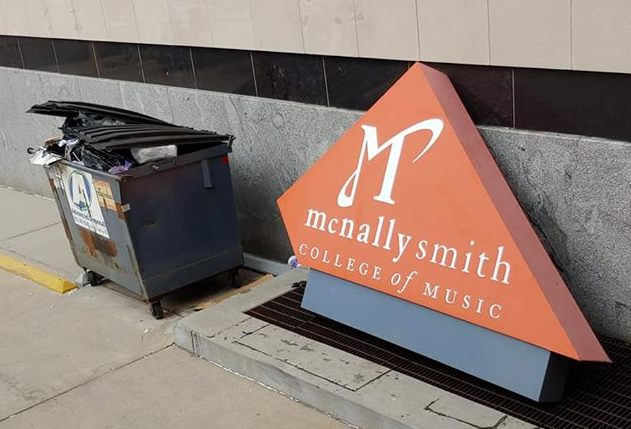
- The school's post-bankruptcy masthead
- Other names: MSCM, McNally
- Former names: Guitar Center of Minneapolis, MusicTech College
- Type: Private for-profit music school
- Active: 1984–December 14, 2017
- Academic affiliations: National Association of Schools of Music, Higher Learning Commission
- Chairman: John McNally
- President: Harry Chalmiers
- Principal: John McNally and Douglas Smith
- Director: Chris Osgood
- Faculty: 101
- Administrative staff: 101
- Students: c. 500/year
- Location: Saint Paul, Minnesota, U.S. 44°56′58″N 93°5′51″W
- Campus: Urban
- Colors: Orange, black
- Website: None, was mcnallysmith.edu

McNally Smith College of Music was a private for-profit music school in Saint Paul, Minnesota. Initially founded in 1984 as the Guitar Center of Minneapolis, it was renamed Musictech College and moved to St. Paul in 2001. The school was renamed again as McNally Smith College of Music by the school's two founders, Jack McNally and Doug Smith, to memorialize themselves on the school's 2005 20th anniversary.

Initially, the school's concept was vocational, with a mission of providing students with real world skills in which to earn a living in the music industry. The vocational school began with six instructors and 200 private lesson students in a 3,000 square foot space within the Minneapolis warehouse district on Washington Avenue. In the fall of 1986, the Guitar Center began offering a state-approved full-time program. By 2000, the guitar school had become a music college, with over 250 students pursuing associate degrees and diploma certificates. With financial assistance from the state of Minnesota and the city of St Paul, the college purchased and renovated the former St Paul Arts & Science Center building into a 60,000 square foot campus with a 12-studio audio production complex, customized classrooms, library, bookstore, café, and a 300-seat auditorium with a 20k-watt Midas/EV sound system. The school offered degree programs in Music Production, Music Business, Composition and Songwriting, Guitar, Bass, Keyboards, Brass and Woodwinds, Strings, and Liberal Arts. In the fall of 2009 the school opened what it described as the "first nationally accredited diploma program for hip-hop". Over the next several years, BA and MA degree programs were made available.

In 2005, the reorganized McNally Smith College of Music moved away from vocational training to become a traditional liberal arts school. The college opened a European campus at the Media Docks in Lübeck, Germany, in 2004. The German campus was officially closed in 2009. School enrollment peaked in 2007.

McNally Smith College of Music declared bankruptcy on December 17, 2017; a week before the end of the 2017 fall semester, announcing that it would close on December 20. In an email, McNally Smith board Chairman Jack McNally requested that the staff to continue working without pay for the final days so students could receive credit. The school's CFO had abruptly resigned a few weeks before the bankruptcy announcement. Bankruptcy proceedings were completed in late 2018 and the bankruptcy process complicated the lawsuits that were still in process (as of 2019). However, the bankruptcy court auctioned off the school's assets by mid-June, 2018.

== Notable faculty ==
- John (Chopper) Black, recording engineer
- Mike Bogle, trombonist, pianist, vocalist, composer, and arranger
- Terry Burns, double bass player, composer, author
- Marvin Dahlgren, orchestral and jazz percussionist, educator, author, and clinician.
- Dessa, (Artist in Residence) singer, songwriter, poet, published author and hip-hop artist
- Mike Elliott, guitarist, band leader, composer, author
- Joe Elliott, guitarist, educator, band leader, author
- Freddy Fresh, underground dance music artist
- Scott Joseph Jarrett, multi-instrument musician, singer/songwriter, recording engineer and producer.
- Gordy Knudtson, drummer, percussion technique author.
- Joe Mabbott, record producer and recording engineer
- Michael McKern, educator, musician, recording engineer and studio owner
- Jeremy Messersmith, (Artist in Residence) singer/songwriter
- Scott Rivard, recording engineer, Minnesota Public Radio studio engineer who recorded most of the station's internationally famous Prairie Home Companion shows. As an engineer at Sound 80, Scott and Tom Jung made some of the first quality recordings on 3M's digital systems including Flim & the BB's, the second professional digital recording ever made in the United States.
- Randy Sabien, jazz violinist, founder and chair of the Jazz Strings department of Berklee College of Music (1978–1981) and chair of the Strings department at McNally Smith in 2009.
- Bobby Stanton, guitarist, composer, winner of 7 Boston music awards, ASCAP and BMI awards, and is a professor at Berklee School of Music.
- Craig Schlattman, director, writer, producer, and cinematographer, 2008 Bush Foundation award recipient.
- Pete Whitman, saxophone player, composer, band leader
- Toki Wright, rapper, organizer, and educator
