= The Poet Game =

Studio album by Greg Brown
- Released: 1994
- Genre: Folk
- Length: 53:12
- Label: Red House
- Producer: Bo Ramsey and Greg Brown

Greg Brown chronology
Bathtub Blues (1993)	The Poet Game (1994)	The Live One (1995)

The Poet Game is an album by American folk singer/guitarist Greg Brown, released in 1994.

== Reception ==
Professional ratings
Review scores
Source	Rating
Allmusic	3/5 stars
Robert Christgau	

Writing for Allmusic, music critic Richard Meyer wrote of the album "Greg Brown's latest release is somber and streetwise with more political undertones than his previous CDs... Production is simple and in a few cases one would have liked to hear a bit more thought given to the instrumental arrangement, but still this is a fine stripped-to-the-bone songwriter album by one of the premiere contemporary writers." Music critic Robert Christgau gave the album a "Neither" rating.

== Track listing ==
All songs by Greg Brown.

1. "Brand New '64 Dodge" – 3:49
2. "Boomtown" – 3:17
3. "Poet Game" – 5:30
4. "Ballingall Hotel" – 5:42
5. "One Wong Turn" – 3:46
6. "Jesus and Elvis" – 3:39
7. "Sadness" – 5:50
8. "Lately" – 4:27
9. "Lord, I Have Made You a Place in My Heart" – 4:17
10. "My New Book" – 6:01
11. "Driftless" – 3:06
12. "Here in the Going Going Gone" – 3:48

== Personnel ==
- Greg Brown – vocals, guitar
- Bo Ramsey – guitar, lap steel guitar
- Gordon Johnson – bass, guitar
- Robin Adnan Anders – percussion
- Rob Arthur – organ
- Steve Hayes – drums

== Production ==
- Produced by Bo Ramsey and Greg Brown
- Engineered by Tom Tucker
- Mixed by Tom Tucker, Greg Brown, Bo Ramsey
- Assistant engineer - Fred Harrington
