= Mike Dowling =

American songwriter

Mike Dowling is an American roots music guitarist and songwriter who is best known for his solo arrangements on the Grammy Award-winning composition CD Henry Mancini: Pink Guitar. In 2005, Dowling was ranked as one of the twelve best fingerstyle guitarists in the United States.

== Early life ==
Dowling was raised in Wisconsin before moving to Nashville. He learned about song structures while taking piano lessons when he was ten years old. Dowling got his first guitar when he was twelve years old.

== Career ==
After dropping out of college, Dowling was hired by fiddler Vassar Clements to play in his touring band, and his playing can be heard on Clement's Grammy-nominated Nashville Jam album. He performed and recorded with jazz violin pioneer Joe Venuti and mandolinist Jethro Burns. In 1991, Dowling released his first solo album, Beats Workin' , featuring Clements. Dowling won a Grammy Award for his solo work on Henry Mancini: Pink Guitar. He designed the El Trovador guitar for National Reso-Phonic Guitars. Dowling was a guest on A Prairie Home Companion.

== Songwriting ==
While in Nashville, Dowling has written songs that were recorded by artists such as Emmylou Harris, Kathy Mattea, Claire Lynch, Del McCoury and George Fox. A recording of his song Backtrackin' by The Nashville Bluegrass Band was nominated Bluegrass Song of the Year in 1994 by the International Bluegrass Music Association.

== Personal life ==
Dowling lives in Wyoming with his wife Jan. Dowling spends some of his free time as a guitar instructor where he also releases material on Homespun Tapes.

== Discography ==
- Swamp Dog Blues (Strictly Country, 1995)
- Beats Workin' (Strictly Country, 1996)
- Live at the Cafe Carpe with Randy Sabien (Fiddlehead Music, 1996)
- String Crazy (Wind River Guitar, 2000)
- Two of a Kind with Pat Donohue (Solid Air, 2001)
- Bottomlands (Solid Air, 2001)
- Blue Fandango (Wind River Guitar, 2005)
- Henry Mancini: Pink Guitar (2004)
- The Blues Ain't News (Wind River Guitar, 2008)
- Eclectricity with David Lange (Wind River Guitar, 2011)
- Tracks (Wind River Guitar, 2015)
