= The Iowa Waltz =

Studio album by Greg Brown
- Released: 1981
- Genre: Folk
- Length: 44.29
- Label: Brown Street Music
- Producers: Greg Brown, Steven Henke

Greg Brown chronology
44 & 66 (1980)	The Iowa Waltz (1981)	One Night (1983)

The Iowa Waltz is an album by folk singer/guitarist Greg Brown. It was re-issued in 1984 by Red House Records. It was the newly formed label's first release, carrying the issue number "01."

== Reception ==
Professional ratings
Review scores
Source	Rating
Allmusic	3/5 stars

Writing for Allmusic, music critic David Freedlander wrote of the album "As sweet as a watermelon on a hot summer afternoon, and as a beautifully simple as dusty country road, Greg Brown's Iowa Waltz shows the man who later was to become one of the greatest folk singers of his generation at his earliest and most casually sublime... If Iowa Waltz doesn't stir your soul, then check your pulse."

== Track listing ==
All songs by Greg Brown

1. "The Iowa Waltz" – 3:50
2. "Mississippi Serenade" – 3:35
3. "Counting Feedcaps" – 3:27
4. "Grand Junction" – 3:03
5. "Out in the Country" – 7:33
6. "Walking the Beans" – 3:40
7. "My Home in the Sky" – 3:40
8. "King Corn" – 6:13
9. "Daughters" – 4:10
10. "Four Wet Pigs" – 1:54
11. "The Train Carrying Jimmie Rodgers Home" – 3:24

== Personnel ==
- Greg Brown – vocals, guitar
- Dave Hansen – bass
- Dave Moore – harmonica
- Al Murphy – fiddle
- Mike Watts – drums
- John Welstead – drums
- David Williams – banjo, guitar, mandolin

== Production ==
- Produced by Greg Brown and Steven Henke
- Engineered and mixed by David Welstead
- Photography by Jerome Goedkin
