= Voicings =

Studio album by Rio Nido
- Released: 1986
- Label: ProJazz
- Producer: Rio Nido

Rio Nido chronology
Hi Fly (1985)	Voicings (1986)

Voicings was the last recording by the Minneapolis jazz vocal group Rio Nido. The album was one of the early recordings to feature live "direct to digital" recording techniques.

Professional ratings
Review scores
Source	Rating
Allmusic	2/5 stars

== Track listing ==
1. "Northern Lights" (D. Karr, L. Ball)
2. "I'm So Lonesome I Could Cry" (Hank Williams)
3. "In a Mellow Tone" (Duke Ellington)
4. "Lost and Found" (T. Sparks, M. Jackson)
5. "Since I Fell For You" (B. Johnson)
6. "You and I" (Stevie Wonder)
7. "Auld Lang Syne" (Trad.)
8. "Flying Home" (L. Hampton)

== Personnel ==
- Prudence Johnson - vocals
- Tim Sparks - vocals, guitar
- Roger Hernandez - vocals
- Tom Lewis - bass
- Dave Birget - guest vocalist, bass
- Jimmy Hamilton - piano
- Bill Carrothers - piano
- Phil Hey - drums
- Marc Anderson - percussion
- Gary "Ice Man" Berg - tenor sax, chromatic harmonica
- Dave Karr - tenor sax
- Kathy Jensen - tenor sax, flute
- Dave Jensen - trumpet, flugelhorn
- Pete Emblom - trombone, arranger

== Production notes ==
- Produced by Rio Nido
