= Bill Morrissey =

American folk songwriter (1951–2011)

- Born: November 25, 1951; Hartford, Connecticut
- Died: July 23, 2011 (aged 59) Dalton, Georgia
- Genre: Folk
- Occupation: Singer-songwriter
- Instruments: Guitar, harmonica, vocals
- Years active: 1980–2011
- Label: Rounder Records
- Website: Official web site

Bill Morrissey (November 25, 1951 – July 23, 2011) was a Grammy-nominated American folk singer-songwriter based in New Hampshire.

== Early life ==
Morrissey was born in Hartford, Connecticut. Growing up in Connecticut and Massachusetts, he started playing guitar at age 13 and formed a jug band in high school. He graduated from Acton-Boxborough Regional High School in 1969 and studied literature for a short time at Plymouth State University before beginning his musical career. Morrissey hitch-hiked to Alaska, worked on a fishing boat, then down to California doing odd jobs and trying to get gigs. His travels eventually brought him back to New England, where he found work in a mill in Newmarket, New Hampshire.

He was influenced by the American country blues of Mississippi John Hurt and Robert Johnson, the pure country of Hank Williams, the Kansas City jazz of Count Basie and Lester Young, the folk revival of the 1960s, and his own working-class experiences.

== Career ==
His eponymous first album was released in 1984 on the Reckless label, and then re-recorded for the Philo label. It includes the song "Small Town on the River", which, as with much of his work, reflects life in New England mill towns. In this case, it's a song about a small town in New Hampshire after the mill closes.

Over the course of a three-decade career, two of Morrissey's twelve albums received Grammy nominations and several earned 4-star reviews in Rolling Stone. Stephen Holden, for The New York Times, wrote, "Mr. Morrissey's songs have the force of poetry...a terseness, precision of detail and a tone of laconic understatement that relate his lyrics to the stories of writers like Raymond Carver and Richard Ford."

In addition to his song-writing, Morrissey is also the author of two novels: Edson (1996) and Imaginary Runner (posthumously published in November 2011). He said that his writing was influenced by Raymond Carver and Thomas Williams.

Morrissey's last album, Come Running, was co-produced with Billy Conway of Morphine, and released in 2007 on Morrissey's label, Turn and Spin Media. Come Running features guitar work by Dave Alvin and the remaining members of Morphine, Billy Conway and Dana Colley.

While Morrissey was best known for his often dark, literate lyrics, he also occasionally wrote humorous songs, such as "Party at the UN" ("It's such a happy community / Everyone's got diplomatic immunity") and "Grizzly Bear", about a frustrated working-class man dating a wealthy young woman who wants to "dance till we dehydrate," while he just wants to "take her home and dance the grizzly bear."

== Personal life ==
Bill Morrissey was married and divorced twice. His first wife was Lisa Glines. His second wife was Ellen Karas. Morrissey continued to work with Ellen Karas professionally after their divorce.

== Death ==
Morrissey died of heart disease in Dalton, Georgia on July 23, 2011, during a tour of the Southern US.

== Discography ==
- Bill Morrissey (1984)
- North (1986)
- Standing Eight (1989)
- Bill Morrissey (re-recording of the 1984 album plus three previously unreleased songs) (1991)
- Inside (1992)
- Friend of Mine (with Greg Brown) (1993)
- Night Train (1993)
- You'll Never Get to Heaven (1996)
- Songs of Mississippi John Hurt (1999)
- Something I Saw Or Thought I Saw (2001)
- Bill Morrissey: The Essential Collection (2004)
- Come Running (2007)

== Bibliography ==
- Morrissey, Bill (1996). Edson. Knopf. ISBN 0-679-44629-X.
- Morrissey, Bill (2011). Imaginary Runner. ISBN 9781105090554.
