= Rio Nido =

American jazz vocal group

- Origin: Minneapolis, Minnesota
- Genres: Vocal jazz music, vocalese
- Years active: 1972–1986, 2007
- Labels: Red House Records, Shadow Records, ProJazz
- Past members: Tim Sparks; Prudence Johnson; Tom Lieberman; Roger Hernandez; Dave Maslow

Rio Nido is an American jazz vocal group based in Minneapolis, Minnesota.

== Band history ==
Rio Nido is a jazz vocal trio that began as part of the Minneapolis West Bank music scene in the early 1970s. The first incarnation of the group consisted of Prudence Johnson on vocals, Tim Sparks on vocals and guitar, and Tom Lieberman on vocals and guitar. Rio Nido performed classic jazz and swing at many Minneapolis hot spots such as The Dakota, New Riverside Cafe and Coffeehouse Extempore. Their first recording was I Like to Riff, released on Shadow Records and featured arrangements of The Boswell Sisters, The Cats and the Fiddle, Stuff Smith, Al Jolson and Nat King Cole.

When Tom Lieberman left the group in the late '70s he was replaced by Roger Hernandez on vocals and drums. Dave Maslow joined on bass and vocals. Rio Nido then focused on the vocalese style of Lambert, Hendricks and Ross and Eddie Jefferson. They also included Doo-Wop classics in their performances.

In 1983 they released Hi Fly on Red House Records and featured Dave Karr on flute and tenor sax and Jimmy Hamilton on piano. Rio Nido’s last recording was Voicings, recorded for the ProJazz label, one of the first early digital recordings released in CD format.

Johnson later became a semi-regular on A Prairie Home Companion and has a successful solo career. Sparks continued his successful musical career as a solo guitarist. Lieberman was the guitarist for A Prairie Home Companion for 10 years, and became an award-winning writer and producer for radio, television, stage and screen.

With the re-release on CD of Hi Fly and I Like to Riff in 2007 by the Japanese label Bittersweet America, Johnson, Sparks and Lieberman performed a number of reunion shows. After joining forces for the benefit of the environmental group Friends of the Headwaters in 2016, the three original members have now reunited, building on their original repertoire with arrangements of "new" classics, and many original compositions.

Rio Nido was inducted into the Minnesota Rock and Country Hall of Fame in April, 2007.

== Discography ==
- I Like to Riff (1978)
- Hi Fly (1983)
- Voicings (1986)
