= Hacklebarney =

Live album by Greg Brown (with Dick Pinney)
- Released: 1974
- Genre: Folk
- Label: Mountain Railroad Records (MR-52774)

Greg Brown (with Dick Pinney) chronology
Hacklebarney (1974)	44 & 66 (1980)

Hacklebarney is a 1974 LP by singer-songwriters Greg Brown and Dick Pinney, recorded live at Charlotte's Web, Rockford, Illinois, in February 1974. It was released on the Mountain Railroad Records label. It is out of print.

== Track listing ==
1. "My Pa, He Came Home as Quiet as the Evening" (Brown)
2. "Hacklebarney" (not to be confused with "Hacklebarney Tune") (Brown)
3. "On New Year's Day" (Brown)
4. "Bad Roads in Spring" (Brown)
5. "The Last Shepherd" (Brown)
6. "Tornado" (Brown)
7. "Dicker" (Pinney)
8. "One Restless Woman" (Brown)
9. "Even Ozzie and Harriet Get the Blues" (Pinney)
10. "Walk Me 'round Your Garden" (Pinney)
11. "Driftin'" (Pinney/Brown)
12. "How Black the Fields" (Brown)
