= Pieta Brown =

American musician and singer-songwriter

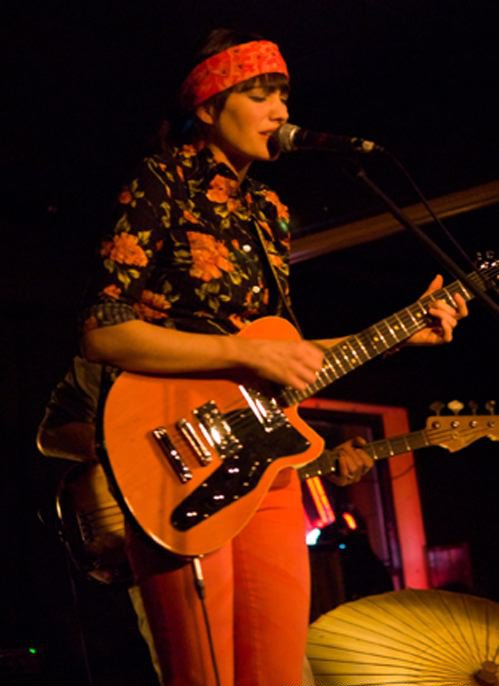
- Brown on stage in 2011.

Background information
- Born: Iowa City, Iowa, United States
- Genres: Folk, Indie, Americana
- Instruments: Vocals, guitar, piano
- Years active: 1990s–present
- Labels: Righteous Babe Records, 37d03d, Red House Records
- Website: pietabrown.com

Pieta Brown (born 1973) is an American singer-songwriter, artist, producer, and multi-instrumentalist who has released eight albums and five EPs. She is considered a folk/indie singer-songwriter, with Brown also naming country blues and jazz as strong influences on her musical style.

== Early life ==
Brown was born in Iowa City, Iowa, United States. Her early "bohemian" upbringing was in rural Iowa in a house with no running water, heat, or indoor bathroom. There, Brown was exposed to traditional and rural folk music through her father, singer-songwriter Greg Brown. Brown's parents separated when she was very young and at age 8 she moved to Birmingham, Alabama with her mother. Pieta spent her childhood living in 17 different residences between Iowa and Alabama with a short time in St. Paul, Minnesota. While living with her mother in Alabama, Brown began writing poetry and composing instrumental songs on piano.

== Career ==
Pieta released her self-titled debut record in 2002, co-produced with Bo Ramsey, which NPR Music heralded as "a ghostly collection of largely melancholy songs rooted in the blues." Her 2005 follow-up In The Cool was named one of the year's best by Amazon Music who called it "calming, hypnotic, and seductive." Her next album, Remember The Sun, was released in 2007 and was cited as one of the year's best by The Wall Street Journal. In 2009, Brown released an EP called Shimmer, which was produced by Don Was after hearing her on his car radio in a live solo performance.

In 2010, Brown signed with Red House Records and released One and All. She joined Mark Knopfler’s North American tour later that year, had a string of performance dates with John Prine, participated in a full orchestral show with Brandi Carlile, and embarked on her own performance tour in Australia. It was followed by the 2011 release of Mercury which held the #1 position on the American Folk Radio Chart for 5 months, was included in iTunes' Great Americana Albums of 2011, and landed at #26 in American Songwriter's Top 50 Albums of 2011. All Music Guide called it "terrific," while Exclaim! named it "not just a beautiful album, but an essential one."

Brown released her sixth studio album Paradise Outlaw in 2014. It was her most critically successful album to date, with praise from NPR's Weekend Edition, Bust Magazine, Folk Alley, and American Songwriter. It was recorded and mixed by BJ Burton at April Base Studio and features guests Amos Lee, Mark Knopfler, and studio owner Justin Vernon of Bon Iver. Vernon would later cite this as his "favorite album recorded at April Base."

In 2017, Pieta went independent and self-released Postcards. The album explores the role of distance and isolation through collaboration as Brown enlisted special guest artists for each track through the mail. She described the process as “musical postcards,” consisting of her original stripped-down, acoustic shells of the song that each artist would then add their parts to and mail back. The list of collaborators included Mark Knopfler, Calexico, Mason Jennings, Mike Lewis, David Lindley, and Carrie Rodriguez. Postcards was praised by publications including Billboard, Chicago Tribune, Guitar World, and American Songwriter, who stated, “Brown sounds committed and melancholy throughout, a natural extension of the solitary circumstances that created this moving, emotional music.”

Pieta’s full-length album Freeway was released on September 20, 2019 through Ani DiFranco’s Righteous Babe Records. It was co-produced with S. Carey of Bon Iver and recorded at Justin Vernon's April Base Studios. In addition to Carey, who also plays on the album, it features bassist Mike Lewis (Bon Iver, Andrew Bird) and guitarist Jeremy Ylvisaker (Andrew Bird, Alpha Consumer). Freeway was recorded mostly live over the course of just three days with Carey, Lewis, and Ylvisaker hearing the songs for the first time on the spot in the studio while recording. Of the experimental process, Pieta said “it allowed them to rely on their gut instincts and to react to the tunes (and each other) in real time.” Freeway was met with widespread critical acclaim from NPR Music, Stereogum, Paste, Billboard, Flood Magazine, and American Songwriter among others. Don Was also participated by writing the liner notes for the album.

In 2020, Pieta released the collaborative EP We Are Not Machines via the artist collective label 37d03d. The 3-track release centers around the single “We Are Not Machines” which features Ani DiFranco and S. Carey. It was originally recorded in November 2019 at Justin Vernon and Aaron Dessner’s annual HIVER Festival in Eaux Claires, WI. The other two tracks on the EP expand on the single’s original theme, featuring contributions from William Brittelle, Holland Andrews, Jenn Wasner, The Metropolis Ensemble, knotahaiku, Limit Infrared, and Grammy-nominated visual artist Eric Timothy Carlson.

== Film career ==
In 2017, Pieta performed in the leading role of the feminist/indie Swiss film (in French) Autour de Luisa ("Around Luisa"). Brown also co-wrote several original songs that were featured in the film with French pop singer-songwriter Bertrand Belin, who also appeared in the film. This debut led to an invitation to appear in the underground experimental zombie short film The Bride, directed by Vincent Parronaud featuring the music of Thomas De Pourquery and Supersonic.

== Discography ==
=== Studio albums ===
- 2002: Pieta Brown (Trailer Records)
- 2005: In the Cool (Valley Entertainment)
- 2007: Remember the Sun (One Little Independent)
- 2010: One and All (Red House)
- 2011: Mercury (Red House)
- 2014: Paradise Outlaw (Red House)
- 2017: Postcards (Lustre)
- 2019: Freeway (Righteous Babe)

=== Singles and EPs ===
- 2003: I Never Told You (T Records)
- 2007: "This Land Is Your Land" featuring Calexico
- 2008: Flight Time (T Records)
- 2009: Shimmer (Red House)
- 2015: Drifters (Lustre)
- 2020: We Are Not Machines (37d03d)

=== Compilations and contributions ===
- 2002: Going Driftless: An Artist's Tribute to Greg Brown (Red House Records) - "Ella Mae"
- 2006: A Case For Case: A Tribute to the Songs of Peter Case (Hungry For Music) – "Spell of Wheels"
- 2007: Just One More: A Tribute To Larry Brown (Bloodshot) – "Another Place in Time"
- 2008: Before The Goldrush: A Project to Benefit Teach For America - "Birds"
- 2010: Think Out Loud - "King Of My Heart"
- 2011: A Nod to Bob 2 (Red House) – "Dirt Road Blues"
- 2013: Fall to Rise (Little Secret Records) – "Love Over Gold (with Lucie Thorne)"

=== Guest Artist ===
- 2004: Greg Brown – Honey in the Lion's Head (Trailer)
- 2006: Bo Ramsey – Stranger Blues - co-producer
- 2008: Bo Ramsey – Fragile (Continental Song City) - co-producer
- 2008: Calexico – Carried to Dust (Quarterstick)
- 2008: The Wood Brothers – Loaded (Blue Note)
- 2009: Chad Elliot – Redemption Man
- 2011: Amos Lee – Mission Bell (Blue Note)
- 2012: Greg Brown – Hymns For What Is Left
- 2012: Calexico – Algiers (Anti-)
- 2013: Mason Jennings – Always Been
- 2015: Calexico – Edge of the Sun (Quarterstick)
- 2015: Iris DeMent – The Trackless Woods (Flariella)
- 2015: Lucie Thorne – Everything Sings Tonight
- 2016: The Pines – Above The Prairie (Red House)
- 2018: Jeffrey Foucalt – Blood Brothers
- 2021: The Colorist Orchestra & Howe Gelb ft. Pieta Brown – "Not On The Map"
- 2023: Iris DeMent – Workin' on a World (Flariella)
