= Honey in the Lion's Head =

Studio album by Greg Brown
- Released: Jan 27, 2004
- Genre: Folk
- Length: 47:23
- Label: Trailer Records
- Producer: Greg Brown, Bo Ramsey

Greg Brown chronology
If I Had Known: Essential Recordings, 1980–96 (2003)	Honey in the Lion's Head (2004)	In the Hills of California (2004)

Honey in the Lion's Head is an album by folk singer/guitarist Greg Brown. It is his second release on the Trailer Records label.

Of the 12 tracks, ten are traditional songs. One is Jim Garland’s Depression-era classic, “I Don’t Want Your Millions Mister”, and the other is a Brown original. Brown's wife, Iris DeMent and daughters Constie and Pieta Brown join on background vocals.

== Reception ==
Professional ratings
Review scores
Source	Rating
Allmusic	3/5 stars
PopMatters	(no rating)
No Depression	(no rating)

Writing for Allmusic, music critic Ronnie D. Lankford Jr. wrote "Despite Brown's lethargic pacing, fans of traditional music will be glad someone dusted off these venerable songs and put a bit of life in them." Jim Musser of No Depression wrote of Brown's song choices "the flexible lyrics and deathless tunes of his youth have always remained true, and he more than repays the debt he owes them."

Writing for PopMatters, Seth Limmer was equivocal about the release, calling the album "a good listen, although nowhere near as compelling as any of Brown’s original work. The breathtaking moments are few and far between."

== Track listing ==
All songs Traditional, arranged by Greg Brown; except where indicated.

1. "Railroad Bill" – 4:06
2. "I Believe I'll Go Back Home" – 4:45
3. "Who Killed Cock Robin" – 4:09
4. "Old Smokey" – 4:54
5. "The Foggy Dew" – 3:58
6. "Down in the Valley" – 5:22
7. "Ain't No One Like You" (Greg Brown) – 2:34
8. "Green Grows the Laurel" – 4:08
9. "I Don't Want Your Millions Mister" (Jim Garland) – 2:47
10. "I Never Will Marry" – 3:35
11. "Samson" – 3:54
12. "Jacob's Ladder" – 3:11

== Personnel ==
- Greg Brown – vocals, guitar
- Bob Black – banjo, 5-string guitar
- Bo Ramsey – guitar
- Rick Cicalo – bass
- Keith Dempster – harmonica on "Railroad Bill"
- Iris DeMent – background vocals (on "Jacob's Ladder")
- Constie Brown – background vocals
- Pieta Brown – background vocals
- Al Murphy – fiddle, mandolin, background vocals
