= Live at the Black Sheep =

Live album by Greg Brown, Pete Heitzman, Garnet Rogers, Karen Savoca
- Released: August 19, 2003
- Recorded: August 26 & 27, 2002
- Genre: Folk
- Label: Alcove (31503)

Greg Brown chronology
Milk of the Moon (2002)	Live at the Black Sheep (2003)	If I Had Known: Essential Recordings, 1980–96 (2003)

Live at the Black Sheep is a live album by folk singer/guitarist Greg Brown.

Performing with Brown are Garnet Rogers, and the duo of Pete Heitzman and Karen Savoca. After all four musicians had performed at the Ottawa Folk Festival, they crossed the Ottawa River and made their way to the Black Sheep, a club in Wakefield, Quebec, for two nights of joint concerts. These recordings are taken from those sessions.

== Track listing ==
Greg Brown performs on tracks 1, 4, 7, 10 and 12.

1. "Last Fair Deal Gone Down" (Johnson)
2. "Nowhere to Go" (Savoca)
3. "I Still Miss Someone" (Cash, Cash Jr.)
4. "Milk of the Moon" (Brown)
5. "Between Girl and Gone" (K. Savoca)
6. "In the Wind" (Rogers)
7. "Little Satchel" (trad.)
8. "Same All Over" (Savoca)
9. "Who Could Have Known" (Rogers)
10. "Summer Lightning" (Rogers)
11. "Bittersweet" (Savoca)
12. "Beulah Land" (trad.)
13. "Goodnight, Irene" (Huddie Ledbetter)

== Personnel ==
- Greg Brown – vocals, guitar
- Garnet Rogers - vocals, guitar, fiddle, flute
- Karen Savoca - vocals, congas, percussion
- Pete Heitzman - guitar, six-string bass
- Marcus Vichert - project coordination, live recording, editing (with thanks to Scott Merrit)
- Steve Darke - live sound
- Mix by Marcus Vichert and Pete Heitzman
- Mastering by Peter Moshay at A-Pawling Studio, Pawling NY
