= The Evening Call =

Studio album by Greg Brown
- Released: Aug 8, 2006
- Genre: Folk
- Label: Red House
- Producers: Greg Brown, Bo Ramsey

Greg Brown chronology
In the Hills of California (2004)	The Evening Call (2006)	Yellow Dog (2007)

The Evening Call is an album by American folk singer/guitarist Greg Brown, released in 2006. It was his first album of all new material in over four years.

== Reception ==
Professional ratings
Review scores
Source	Rating
PopMatters	8/10

A review of the album in Sing Out! includes a lengthy description of the album's sound: "Brown and Ramsey do themselves proud with the laid back production, mostly guitars, bass, soft drums and percussion and the occasional harmonica that never obscure the lyrics and keep the action moving forward. You'll hear every detail of Brown's voice growling its way through the complex and sometimes brilliant lyrics. However, Brown makes Leonard Cohen sound like Mr. Sunshine. This CD requires several listenings to divine all Brown has to say and absorb the depth of his writing, but it's not one you'll want to put on the repeat mode on your CD player."

Acoustic Guitar states that the album "is among Brown's finest work," and suggests the work was "clearly influenced by the sudden death last year of Brown's close friend Bob Feldman, head of Red House Records." Dirty Linen compared the album to "a visit from an old friend", stating that the album, "stimulates self-reflection, connection to happy and painful memories, optimism for the future, and an appreciation of the humor in life..." PopMatters named the album as one of the Best Folk albums of 2006. In his review of The Evening Call, Steve Horowitz wrote "Brown’s songwriting has never been more creative. His voice never sounded more demonstrative. And as an added bonus, the backing instrumentation has never been more sensitive to the nuances of Brown’s many moods."

== Track listing ==
All songs by Greg Brown.

1. "Joy Tears"
2. "Evening Call"
3. "Cold & Dark & Wet"
4. "Bucket"
5. "Mighty Sweet Watermelon"
6. "Treat Each Other Right"
7. "Eugene"
8. "Coneville Slough"
9. "Kokomo"
10. "Pound It on Down"
11. "Skinny Days"
12. "Whippoorwill"

== Personnel ==
- Greg Brown – vocals, guitar, harmonica
- Bo Ramsey – guitar
- Steve Hayes – drums, percussion
- Ricky Peterson – piano, organ
