= Benny Weinbeck =

American jazz musician

Benny Weinbeck (born November 25, 1961, in Winsted, Minnesota) is an American jazz pianist, composer, and media producer.

He has released several albums and has appeared on Gordon Johnson's Trios V1 and V3 with Steve Gadd on drums and performed on many other artist recording projects. He composes music for independent feature films, documentaries, and commercial media. He performs around the U.S. and in Minneapolis with his jazz trio along with bassist Gordon Johnson and drummer Phil Hey.

== Discography ==
=== As leader ===
- Make a Wish... (earthtone, 1991)
- Reflection (earthtone, 1992)
- Whispers (earthtone, 1993)
- Sweet Love (earthtone, 1999)
- Solo Piano Standards (earthtone, 2004)
- For Friends and Lovers (earthtone, 2010)
- Solvieg (soundtrack) (2014)
- Peaceful Christmas

=== As sideman ===
- Gordon Johnson, Trios V1 and Trios V3
- Michael Johnson, Moonlit Déjà Vu
