= Yellow Dog (album) =

Live album by Greg Brown
- Released: August 7, 2007
- Recorded: August 26, 2005
- Venues: Peterson Auditorium, Ishpeming, Michigan
- Genre: Folk
- Label: Fox on a Hill
- Producers: Greg Brown, Ian Gorman

Greg Brown chronology
The Evening Call (2006)	Yellow Dog (2007)	Greg Brown: Live from the Big Top (2007)

Yellow Dog is a live album by American folk singer/guitarist Greg Brown, released in 2007. It is from a benefit show in 2005 for the Upper Peninsula of Michigan's Yellow Dog Watershed.

== Reception ==
Professional ratings
Review scores
Source	Rating
Allmusic	3.5/5 stars
PopMatters	(7 of 10)

Writing for Allmusic, music critic William Ruhlman wrote of the album "Brown presents several "notebook songs," i.e., songs he has written recently in a notebook and not performed before. Not surprisingly, given the forum, he makes frequent references to Michigan and to environmental concerns, among other political issues." Steve Horowitz of PopMatters wrote the album " It's a typical Brown show. His low, rumbling voice exudes cool as he offers personal, matter-of-fact observations about life... He leads with his heart and lets his head follow."

== Track listing ==
All songs by Greg Brown except where noted.

1. "Intro"
2. "Cold+Dark+Wet"
3. "Dream Cafe"
4. "Better Days"
5. "Conesville Slough"
6. "Oily Boys"
7. "All of Those Things"
8. "Canned Goods"
9. "Pitchin' in"
10. "Laughing River"
11. "Please Don't Talk About Me When I'm Gone" (Sidney Clare, Bee Palmer, Sam H. Stept)

== Personnel ==
- Greg Brown – vocals, guitar
- Seth Bernard – guitar
- Drew Howard – pedal steel guitar
- Dominic Suchyta – bass
