= Freak Flag =

Studio album by Greg Brown
- Released: May 23, 2011
- Recorded: Memphis, TN
- Genre: Folk
- Length: 40:42
- Label: Yep Roc
- Producer: Bo Ramsey

Greg Brown chronology
Dream City: Essential Recordings, 1997-2006 (2009)	Freak Flag (2011)

Freak Flag is an album by American folk singer/guitarist Greg Brown, released in 2011. The album peaked at number 34 on Billboard's Top Heatseekers chart.

The original Minneapolis sessions for Freak Flag were ended by a disastrous lightning strike to the recording studio that destroyed all the tracks recorded. Brown went to Memphis and replaced all the songs save the title track in re-recording the album.

== Reception ==
Professional ratings
Review scores
Source	Rating
Allmusic	3/5 stars
PopMatters	5/10

Music critic Mark Deming wrote in his Allmusic "... these songs find him very much in his element, marrying sly but heartfelt vocals to slinky melodies that split the difference between folky simplicity and bluesy grit... here his vocals aren't as strong a vehicle for his songs as they once were. It doesn't seem as if Brown is the least bit worried about this, but Freak Flag is one album where his take-it-or-leave-it attitude starts to fail him, at least as far as his voice is concerned." Stuart Henderson on Popmatters called the album "a disappointing set of sleepy songwriting featuring even sleepier production values. Though there are inevitable moments of shiny genius— there can be no doubt that at his best Greg Brown is among the finest writers and performers of his generation—there are far more moments too easily forgotten."

== Track listing ==
All songs by Greg Brown unless otherwise noted.

1. "Someday House" – 2:38
2. "Where Are You Going When You're Gone" – 3:43
3. "Rain & Snow" – 2:41
4. "Freak Flag" – 4:18
5. "Lovinest One" – 2:46
6. "I Don't Know Anybody in ThisTown" – 3:26
7. "Flat Stuff" – 4:40
8. "Mercy Mercy Mercy" – 3:18
9. "Let the Mystery Be" (Iris DeMent) – 4:04
10. "Remember the Sun" – 4:18
11. "Tenderhearted Child" – 4:50

== Personnel ==
- Greg Brown – vocals, guitar, harmonica
- Bo Ramsey – guitar, vocal harmony
- Richard Bennett – guitar
- Mark Knopfler – guitar
- Steve Hayes – drums, percussion
- Jon Penner – bass
- David Mansfield – strings
- Ricky Peterson – Hammond B3

Production notes:

- Bo Ramsey – producer
- John Hampton – engineer
- Ray Kennedy – engineer, mastering, mixing, shaker
- Jason Gillespie – assistant engineer
- Ross Harvey – assistant engineer
- Tom Tucker – engineer, mixing
- Tod Foley – art direction, design
- Jim Herrington – photography
