= Lorie Line =

American musician (born 1958)

Lorie Line (born 1958) is a classically trained pianist and arranger/composer from Minneapolis, Minnesota.

== Life and career ==
Line grew up in Reno, Nevada, and has played the piano since she was five years old. As a young musician, she won several state piano competitions annually. Line obtained a B.A. in Music, Piano Performance from the University of Nevada in Reno. She married Tim Line in 1986 before moving to Minnesota to accept a job as a pianist for Dayton's department stores.

Since 1989, she has written and arranged over 700 songs, published over 50 books of sheet music, recorded 60 CDs, released on her own independent label. She has sold over 6 million albums and continues to tour and perform about 50 concerts per year. She has produced three television specials for PBS and won the Ernst & Young Entrepreneur of the Year Award in 2002 in the entertainment category. In 2015, Line was inducted into the Minnesota Hall of Fame.
