= Mike Elliott (guitarist) =

- Born: May 18, 1940; Chicago, Illinois, U.S.
- Died: September 14, 2005 (aged 65)
- Genres: Jazz
- Occupation: Musician
- Instrument: Guitar
- Years active: 1960s–1980s
- Formerly of: Natural Life

Mike Elliott (May 18, 1940 – September 14, 2005) was an American jazz guitarist.

Elliott was born in Chicago and raised in Colorado, where he studied guitar with Johnny Smith. His father was a studio musician and his mother a blues singer. He learned guitar at a young age and was playing professionally by the time he was sixteen. He formed his own jazz group and in 1964 was on the road. He moved to Minneapolis in 1966, and in the seventies he helped found the jazz fusion group Natural Life, which included saxophonist Bob Rockwell, bassist Billy Peterson, pianist Bobby Peterson, and drummers Bill Berg and Eric Kamau Gravatt.

In the 1980s, he moved to Nashville, Tennessee, and became manager of Gibson Professional Musical Services. He held clinics with Les Paul, Howard Roberts, and Elliot Easton. His other roles included session work, engineering, producing, arranging, and songwriting. In the mid 1980s he teamed up with songwriter musician Jim Pasquale to form Magic Tracks Recording Studio. He remained in Nashville until 1998. He worked with profile artists such as Johnny Cash, playing on his Johnny Cash Is Coming to Town album, Mickey Newbury, Chubby Checker, Emmylou Harris, Trisha Yearwood and Joe Diffie. Other artists he worked with were Earl Klugh, Vic Damone, Steve Earle, Crystal Gayle, and Tennessee Ernie Ford. He also co wrote a song that appeared on John Anderson's triple-platinum selling album Seminole Wind. In 1996 he received the NAIRD award for his work as an engineer on Steve Earle's Grammy-nominated album Train a Comin.

He died on September 14, 2005. There is now a Mike Elliott scholarship award for excellence in guitar.

== Discography ==
- Atrio (Celebration, 1974)
- City Traffic (ASI, 1977)
- Solo Guitar (Celebration, 1981)
- Diffusion (Celebration/Pausa)

With Natural Life

- Natural Life (Asi/Celebration, 1977)
- Unnamed Land (Celebration, 1977)
- New Music (ASI, 1977)
