= Friend of Mine (Greg Brown and Bill Morrissey album) =

Studio album by Greg Brown, Bill Morrissey
- Released: 1993
- Genre: Folk
- Length: 39:29
- Label: Philo
- Producer: Ellen Karas

Greg Brown, Bill Morrissey chronology
Dream Café (1992)	Friend of Mine (1993)	Bathtub Blues (1993)

Friend of Mine is a folk album by Iowa-born singer/songwriter Greg Brown and New England singer/songwriter Bill Morrissey.

== Reception ==
Professional ratings
Review scores
Source	Rating
Allmusic	4/5 stars

Writing for Allmusic, music critic Alex Henderson called the album "... an unpretentious date that followers of both artists will appreciate."

== Track listing ==
1. "Ain't Life a Brook" (Ferron)
2. "Little Red Rooster" (Dixon)
3. "He Was a Friend of Mine" (Traditional)
4. "Memphis, Tennessee" (Berry)
5. "The Road" (Danny O'Keefe)
6. "You Can't Always Get What You Want" (Mick Jagger, Keith Richards)
7. "Duncan and Brady" (Traditional)
8. "Tom Dula" (Morrissey, Proffitt)
9. "Summer Wages" (Tyson)
10. "I'll Never Get Out of This World Alive" (Hank Williams, Rose)
11. "Fishing with Bill" (Brown)
12. "Baby, Please Don't Go" (Traditional)

== Personnel ==
- Greg Brown – vocals, guitar, harmonica
- Bill Morrissey – vocals, guitar, harmonica, slide guitar
- Billy Conway – drums
- Richard Gates – bass
- Ed Sheridan – bass

== Production ==
- Produced by Ellen Karas
- Engineered by Jesse Henderson
- Mastered by Dr. Toby Mountain
