= Gordon Johnson (musician) =

American double bassist and bass guitarist

- Born: 1952 (age 73–74); Minneapolis, Minnesota, U.S.
- Genre: Jazz
- Occupation: Musician
- Instruments: Double bass, bass guitar
- Labels: Igmod, Tonalities

Gordon "Gordy" Johnson (born 1952), is an American double bassist and bass guitarist who has toured and/or recorded with Roy Buchanan, Bill Carrothers, Lorie Line, Maynard Ferguson, Chuck Mangione, Dewey Redman, Greg Brown, Peter Ostroushko, Paul Winter Consort, Cliff Eberhardt, Maynard Ferguson, Becky Schlegel, Benny Weinbeck, Bradley Joseph, and Stacey Kent. He is the older brother of bassist Jimmy Johnson.

== Discography ==
=== As leader ===
- Gordon Johnson Trios (Tonalities, 1996)
- Trios V.2 (Tonalities, 2002)
- Trios Version 3.0 (Tonalities, 2005)
- GJ4 (Tonalities, 2008)
- Trios No. 5 (Tonalities, 2010)

=== As sideman ===
With Bill Carrothers

- Shine Ball (Fresh Sound New Talent, 2005)

With Laura Caviani

- Holly, Jolly, and Jazzy (Marbles: The Brain Store, 2013)

With Todd Clouser

- A Love Electric (Todd Clouser's A Love Electric, 2010)

With Dave Graf

- Just Like That (Artegra, 2005)

With Mary Louise Knutson

- Call Me When You Get There (Meridian Jazz, 2001)
- In the Bubble (Meridian Jazz, 2011)

With Chris Lomheim

- And You've Been Waiting? (IGMOD, 1994)
- The Bridge (Artegra, 2002)
- Timeline (Lomstradamus, 2014)

With Pete Whitman

- Where's When? (Artegra, 2002)
- The Sound of Water (Artegra, 2002)

With Irv Williams

- Finality (Ding-Dong Music, 2007)

With Eric Wangensteen

- It Had To Be You (2009)
- Blue Christmas (2012)
