= Radoslav Lorković =

Croatian American musician

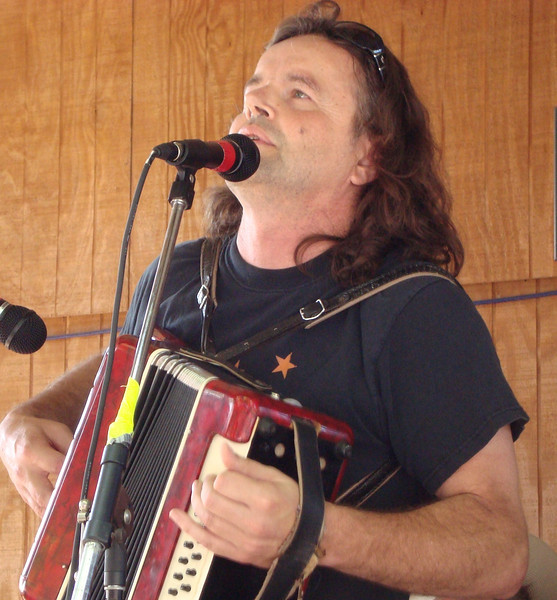
- Lorković performing at the Woody Guthrie Folk Festival Okemah, Oklahoma July 12, 2008
- Born: September 3, 1958 (age 68); Zagreb, Croatia
- Education: University of Iowa
- Occupations: Musician; singer; songwriter
- Awards: Iowa Blues Hall of Fame – 2020 Inductee
- Musical career
- Origin: Iowa City, United States
- Genres: Folk; Americana; Blues; Western swing
- Instruments: Accordion; Piano; Hammond organ; Vocals
- Years active: 1975–present
- Website: radoslavlorkovic.com

Radoslav Lorković (born September 3, 1958) is a Croatian-born and classically trained folk and blues musician, known in particular for his flair on the piano and accordion. He has six solo studio recordings, three live albums and has recorded and performed with numerous artists including Odetta, Asleep at the Wheel, Jimmy LaFave, Shawn Mullins, Greg Brown, Richard Shindell, Ellis Paul, Susan Werner, Ronny Cox, Dave Moore, Andy White, Bo Ramsey, and Ramsay Midwood. His 51 year career as a touring musician has taken him around the world, where he has performed from castles in Italy to Carnegie Hall.

== Growing up ==
Lorković was born into a musical family and grew up listening to classical music. Antonija, his maternal grandmother, sang Croatian, Slovenian, and Czech folk songs to him from the time of his birth. He inherited his piano passion from his paternal grandmother, Melita Lorković, at one time the premier pianist of Yugoslavia. His great-grandfather was one of the great conductors of Eastern Europe. His mother, Tatjana Lorković, remembers her son as a toddler who, when listening to Modest Mussorgky's Pictures at an Exhibition, would begin to sing. At age one he was reported to be singing back on pitch. By age three he was putting on floor shows for his grandfather and friends who would respond by showering him with coins yelling "pivaj Radoslav pivaj!" After this blend of central European musical influences, Lorković's family moved to London when he was five, to Minnesota when he was six, and three years later to Iowa, where he lived for the next many years.

== Music career ==
Lorković started playing piano when he was seven. In high school, a friend who played piano introduced Lorković to the blues. That would be a turning point in Lorković's life. He says: "When I heard John's piano blues I was astounded. He showed me the scale and the left-hand bass pattern and that led to six hours a day of gleeful, voluntary practicing. Shortly thereafter I started learning music by ear. Then my buddy had a ticket to the Grateful Dead concert and, well, the rest is history." After his friend, Phil, took him to the Grateful Dead show, they formed a band. Lorković says: "But my friend Phil who took me to the show and I bought instruments – a Gibson SG guitar and a Gibson amp – and learned all of Europe ’72. The guitar was for Phil, and I just used the little upright piano in my living room. We dropped a mic in it and jammed at my house, usually when my mom was out. This led to me being a musician." During a gig at a venue in Iowa City, Iowa called The Sanctuary, producer/musician Bo Ramsey heard him play and for three or four years while in college Lorković was a member of Ramsey's band The Third Street Sliders. Eventually he started playing piano for singer-songwriters Greg Brown, who he had met in Iowa, and Richard Shindell, who he had met in Italy. Although Lorković has recorded several solo albums, according to No Depression he is best known for the "virtuoso musicianship and beauty he has put into many other artists’ music – both live and in the studio". Lorković met Austinite Jimmy LaFave during the 1990s and in 2005, when he became a member of LaFave's band, he moved to Austin. "He's like a mad genius," LaFave says. "If I know a crowd's not responding, I'll throw a Hail Mary to Rad. His showmanship adds so much flair to a live gig." In 2014, Lorković and Scott Crago (drummer for The Eagles) played on LaFave's cover of Jackson Browne's "For Everyman" on Music Roads Records' Looking into You: A Tribute to Jackson Brown. Lorković's piano playing on LaFave's 2015 release The Night Tribe, is said to be "straight from the Garth Hudson School of Excellence; and his tinkling of the ivories turns a very good album into a great one." Of LaFave, Lorković says: "Jimmy is a true rocker, and he brings that out in me."

Around that time, he also became a piano accompanist to the late blues great Odetta. "Odetta," he says, "stands alone. She is by far the best musician I have ever played with. She taught me so much about music, not so much in words, but in gestures, directions, stares, even smiles, and all with her sense of grace."

At some point Lorković found the accordion. He said: "So I came from this world as a proper pianist and I landed on the accordion...and it became the perfect instrument for me because there was so much expression there. The piano's amazing, too, but the accordion, I think it's one of the most versatile instruments out there. It's a lead instrument, it's a wind instrument and...I pretend that I'm playing lead guitar on it."

Lorković tours internationally and often performs at festivals including the Woody Guthrie Folk Festival, held annually in Woody Guthrie's hometown of Okemah, Oklahoma. Sometimes referred to as the "Croatian Sensation," Lorković is known to be the busiest musician during the festival, having first attended in 2005 as a member of Jimmy LaFave's band. A few years later he was on the festival schedule performing his own solo set as well as accompanying many others. Lorković's version of Woody Guthrie's "The Jolly Banker" – which he performs on accordion – was described as being "dazzling". Lorković has also performed on Garrison Keillor's Prairie Home Companion. For several years he has accompanied Ellis Paul at Paul's traditional New Year's Eve shows at Club Passim in Cambridge, Massachusetts.

Lorković's earliest recording, Clear and Cold (1990) was digitally re-mastered and re-released in 2013. In her review of the album for The Oklahoman, Brandy McDonnell said: "Although the Croatian-born singer/songwriter/multi-instrumentalist also is known for his skill on the accordion, Clear and Cold showcases his classical training and fleet-fingered prowess on piano..."

== The Red Accordion ==
During a show in Italy in 1992, Lorković was given a red accordion as a gift. The accordion was his travel companion and the only accordion that he played for the next 20 years. The accordion case, covered in stickers representing Lorković's years of attending folk festivals around the world, was often a favorite subject of photographers. On March 10, 2012, the accordion and case were stolen after a performance at the Brady Theater in Tulsa, Oklahoma. Local news outlets spread the word about the theft in hopes the accordion and case would be returned, and Lorković issued a plea for their return via social media outlets. On Christmas Day 2012 a Tulsa, Oklahoma woman received the accordion as a gift. Upon inspection, she found Lorković's name and after doing some research, discovered that the accordion had been stolen earlier in the year. She was able to contact Lorković and within a few days the accordion was back in Lorković's possession.

== Photography ==
Lorković's interest in photography began in high school when he unexpectedly became a yearbook photographer for his Iowa City High School class of 1975. He went on to study photography under John Schultze at the University of Iowa. Lorković's photographs taken on the road as he travels to his music performances can be found on his Facebook page.

== Discography ==
- Clear and Cold (1990)
- The Line (1992)
- High and Dry (1996)
- Blue Parade (2005)
- Wastelands and Casinos (2010)
- The Po, the Mississippi (2018)

Live albums

- Live from Castello Scaligero (1997)
- Live from Cortile Mercato Vecchio (1998)
- Homer: A Piano Odyssey (2013)
