= Prudence Johnson =

American folk and jazz singer (born 1952)

- Born: c. 1952/1953; Moose Lake, Minnesota, U.S.
- Genres: Folk, jazz
- Occupation: Singer
- Instrument: Vocals
- Labels: Red House
- Website: www.prudencejohnson.com

Prudence Johnson is an American folk and jazz singer.

== Early life and education ==
Johnson grew up in a musical family in Moose Lake, Minnesota. She earned a bachelor's degree in international studies from Hamline University.

== Career ==
In the early 1970s, Prudence was a co-founder with Tim Sparks of the vocal jazz group Rio Nido. The group recorded three albums and performed extensively, most often in the Minneapolis–Saint Paul area.

After her time with Rio Nido, she recorded three solo albums for Red House Records: Vocals, Songs of Greg Brown, and Little Dreamer, the latter a collection of children's lullabies from around the world which earned Johnson a 1992 Grammy Award nomination.

She was awarded a McKnight Fellowship to record Moon Country, a collection of Hoagy Carmichael songs. She collaborated with four Minnesota composers to create A Girl Named Vincent, a presentation of the poetry of Edna St. Vincent Millay set to music.

In 2005, Johnson produced, directed, and performed in a musical production about the sinking of the Edmund Fitzgerald titled Ten November. The production featured Claudia Schmidt, Ruth McKenzie, Kevin Kling and Peter Ostroushko. She produced the album. The production tells the story of the sinking of the ship from the point of view of crew members, local sailors, and the wives of crew members.

She has been a guest on the radio program A Prairie Home Companion. Johnson's film credits include Robert Redford's A River Runs Through It in a role as a singer and Robert Altman's A Prairie Home Companion as herself.

== Discography ==
=== Solo ===
- Little Dreamer (Red House, 1984)
- Vocals (Red House, 1987)
- Dick King Classic Swing and Prudence Johnson: King Swings, Pru Sings (1998)
- Songs of Greg Brown (Red House, 1991)
- Moon Country (Sleeper, 2002)
- S' Gershwin with Dan Chouinard (Sleeper, 2004)
- Gales of November (Sleeper, 2005)
- Peru (Sleeper, 2006)

=== With Rio Nido ===
- I Like to Riff (1978)
- Hi Fly (1983)
- Voicings (1986)
