= Greg Brown (folk musician) =

American folk musician (July 2, 1949)

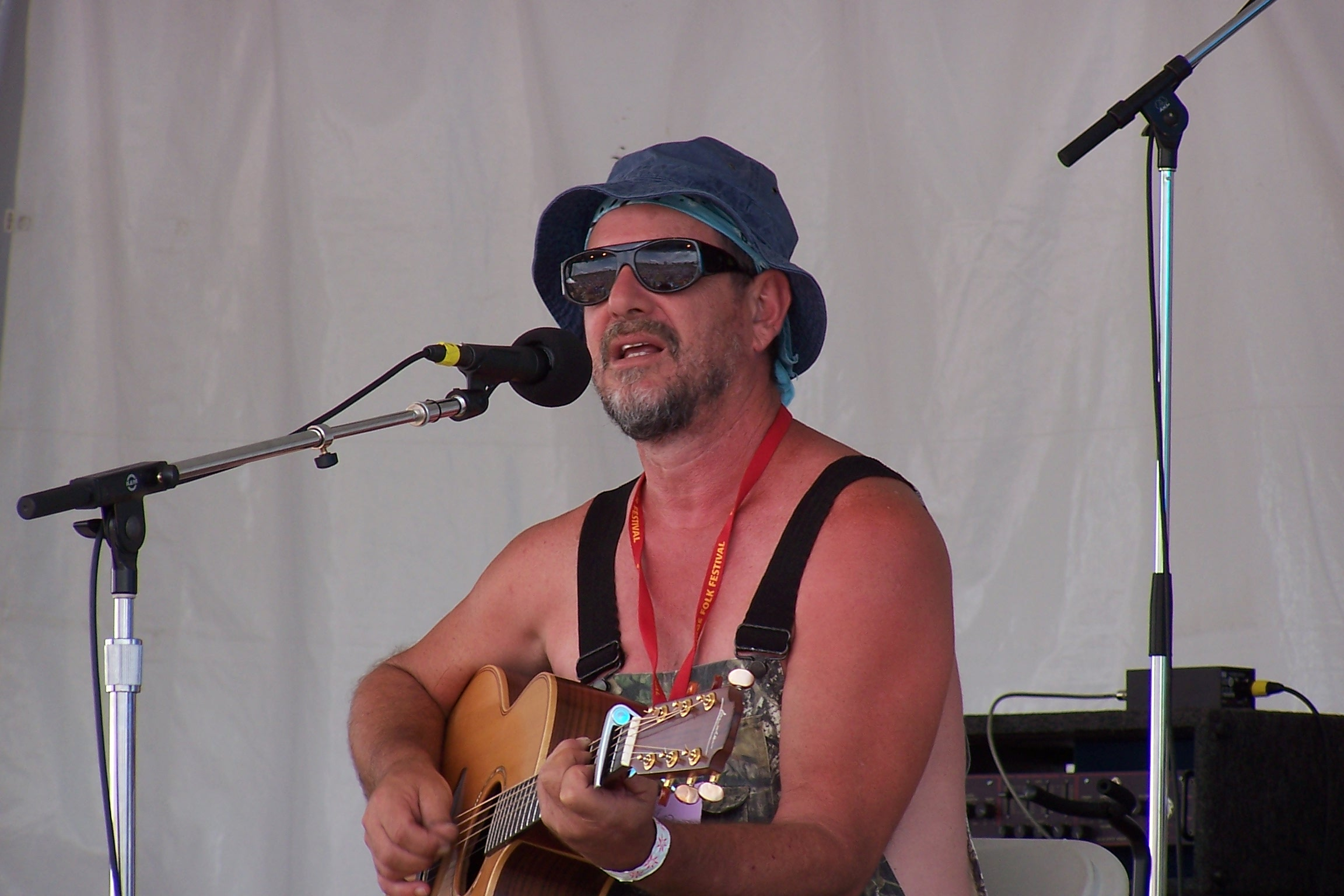
- Greg Brown at the Falcon Ridge Folk Festival in 2004

Background information
- Born: Gregory Dane Brown; July 2, 1949 (age 76); Ottumwa, Iowa, U.S.
- Genres: Folk
- Occupations: Singer-songwriter; guitarist
- Instruments: Vocals; guitar; harmonica
- Years active: 1967–present
- Label: Red House
- Website: gregbrownmusic.org

Gregory Dane Brown (born July 2, 1949) is an American folk singer-songwriter and guitarist from Iowa.

== Early life ==
Brown was born into a musical family, and his father was a Pentecostal minister. He grew up in the Hacklebarney region of southwestern Iowa, which he describes as "hill country." Brown spent several years traveling with a band before returning to Iowa, where he performed live and pursued his songwriting career.

== Career ==
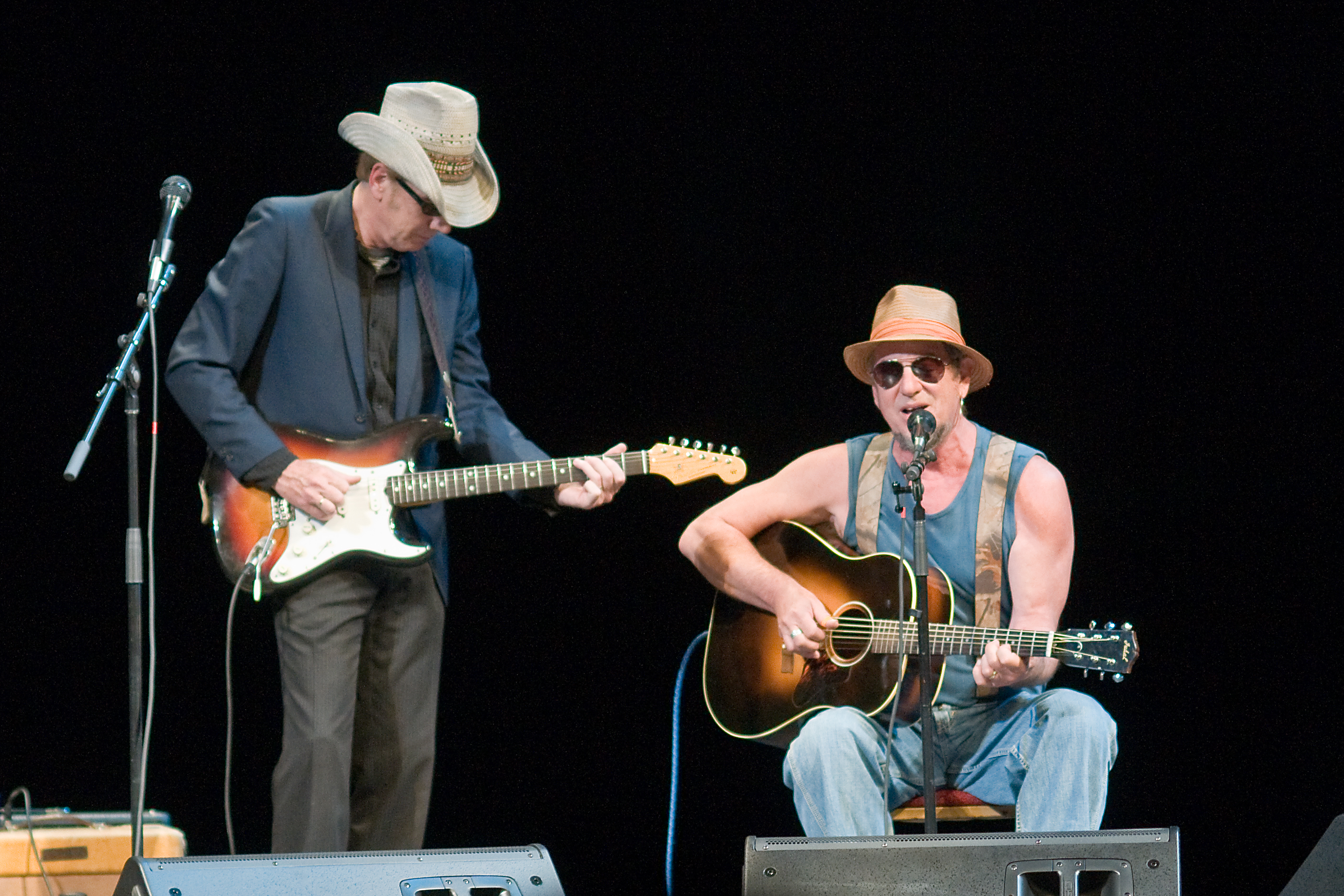
Performing with Bo Ramsey in Dubuque Iowa in May 2008.

During the 1980s Brown toured and had recurring performances on A Prairie Home Companion. Brown self-published two albums, 44 & 66 and The Iowa Waltz. Brown then became the first recording artist on Red House Records, founded by Bob Feldman and Susan Ode after producing a sold-out concert at the Guthrie Theater in Minneapolis, Minnesota, in 1990. In 1986, he released an album called Songs of Innocence and of Experience based on poems by William Blake. His album One Big Town (1989) won an Indie Award from the National Association of Independent Record Distributors and marked the beginning of Brown's long collaboration with Iowa guitarist Bo Ramsey.

The Poet Game (1994), his tenth studio album, saw significant international radio play (charting on AAA and topping The Gavin Report's Americana chart), and received a NAIRD Indie award for singer-songwriter Album of the Year.

His 1996 album Further In received a four-star review from Rolling Stone, which described it as "a contemplative gem" and a "masterwork". Brown's 1997 release Slant 6 Mind earned him a second Grammy nomination.

1999 brought the re-release of One Night, a live concert recording from October 1983 originally released on the Coffeehouse Extempore label. His album Solid Heart CD was recorded in 1999 during a benefit concert. Two releases followed in 2000: Over and Under (Trailer Records) and Covenant, which won the Association for Independent Music’s award for Best Contemporary Folk Album of 2000. A 2002 tribute album, Going Driftless: An Artist’s Tribute to Greg Brown featured guest vocal performances by Ani DiFranco, Gillian Welch, Shawn Colvin, and his three daughters.

In 2006 he released The Evening Call, which Acoustic Guitar magazine described as "among Brown's finest work" and which was featured on an episode of NPR's On Point. A recording of another benefit concert was recorded and released in 2007 under the name Yellow Dog on the EarthWorks Music label. In 2007, Brown was nominated for a Folk Alliance Award. In 2010, Brown played Hades on Hadestown, a concept album by Anaïs Mitchell. His most recent studio album, Hymns to What Is Left, was released in 2012.

Brown retired from touring in 2019, although he performed two times in 2023, stating they were his final shows.

In 2024 he released Ring Around The Moon: A Songbook, a collection of essays, photographs, and sheet music.

== Personal life ==
Greg Brown has been married three times. He has one daughter from his first marriage: Pieta Brown; and two from his second marriage: Constance Brown and Zoe Brown. He has one son. Brown married singer-songwriter Iris DeMent in November 2002. In 2005, he and his wife adopted a daughter from Russia, Daria Chesnokova Victorona (Dasha Brown).

== Discography ==
- Hacklebarney (1974) (with Dick Pinney)
- 44 & 66 (1980)
- The Iowa Waltz (1981)
- One Night (1983)
- In the Dark with You (1985)
- Songs of Innocence and of Experience (1986)
- One More Goodnight Kiss (1988)
- One Big Town (1989)
- Down in There (1990)
- Dream Café (1992)
- Friend of Mine (1993) (with Bill Morrissey)
- Bathtub Blues (1993)
- The Poet Game (1994)
- The Live One (1995)
- Further In (1996)
- Slant 6 Mind (1997)
- Solid Heart (1999) (benefit CD)
- Over and Under (2000)
- Covenant (2000)
- Down in the Valley: Barn Aid Benefit Concert (2001)
- Milk of the Moon (2002)
- Live at the Black Sheep (2003)
- If I Had Known: Essential Recordings, 1980-96 (2003)
- Honey in the Lion's Head (2004)
- In the Hills of California (2004)
- The Evening Call (2006)
- Yellow Dog (2007)
- Live from the Big Top (2007)
- Dream City: Essential Recordings, 1997-2006 (2009)
- Freak Flag (2011)
- Hymns to What Is Left (2012)

=== Tribute albums ===
- Songs of Greg Brown (Prudence Johnson) (1991)
- Going Driftless: An Artist's Tribute to Greg Brown (Various artists) (2002)
- Seth Avett Sings Greg Brown (Seth Avett) (2022)

=== Featured on ===
- Hadestown (Anaïs Mitchell) (2010)
