= Red House Records =

American independent record label

- Founded: 1983
- Founder: Bob Feldman, Susan Ode
- Genre: Folk, Americana
- Country of origin: U.S.
- Location: St. Paul, Minnesota
- Official website: www.redhouserecords.com

Red House Records is an independent folk and Americana record label in St. Paul, Minnesota. The label was founded in 1983 by Bob Feldman and Susan Ode after seeing a performance by Iowa folk singer Greg Brown.

== Origin ==
The label is named for a farmhouse in Iowa where Brown lived when he started it. After Brown's albums 44 & 66 and The Iowa Waltz were released in 1981 and 1982, it briefly went dormant until he met Bob Feldman and Susan Ode in 1983. They produced concerts to promote Brown and other folk musicians. Later Feldman took over the operation of the record label, while Brown focused on his musical endeavors, as he had just signed on to perform on the radio program A Prairie Home Companion regularly. Feldman was known for his business philosophy of wanting "to provide a home and environment in which creative artists can make albums in total freedom—without interference from mogul types just looking for the next hit single." The first album released on the newly restarted label was Brown's In the Dark with You.

Over the next few years, the label focused on publishing work by musicians in the upper Midwest, including Spider John Koerner, Prudence Johnson, Peter Ostroushko, Rio Nido, Jorma Kaukonen and John Gorka. The label made the transition along with the music industry from vinyl to compact discs and started signing established artists from across the U.S. Utah Phillips, Tom Paxton, Norman Blake, Eliza Gilkyson, Loudon Wainwright III, Robin and Linda Williams, Cliff Eberhardt, and Ramblin' Jack Elliott are among the dozens of performers who have released music through Red House. Elliot's South Coast won a Grammy Award for Best Traditional Folk Album in 1996. Eberhardt's album, The High Above and the Down Below, released by Red House in 2007, was named one of the TOP 5 of 2007 by USA Today. Other recordings from the label have won about a dozen Indie Awards from the Association for Independent Music (A2IM). The label has released several compilation albums, including A Nod to Bob, which Red House describes as a tribute from a Minnesota label to a favorite native son.

Feldman continued to head the company until his health deteriorated in late 2005. A few weeks after leaving work, he died on January 11, 2006, at the age of 56.

In November 2017, the Label was purchased by The Compass Records Group in Nashville, and its operations in St. Paul were shuttered.

== See also ==
- List of record labels
- List of electronic music record labels
