= Radio Songs (album) =

Live album by Robin and Linda Williams
- Released: Nov 6, 2007
- Recorded: 1993–2005
- Genres: Americana, folk, country
- Label: Red House
- Producers: Chris Frymire, Robin and Linda Williams

Robin and Linda Williams chronology
The First Christmas Gift (2005)	Radio Songs (2007)	Buena Vista (2008)

Radio Songs is an album by folk music duo Robin and Linda Williams, released in 2007 on Red House Records.

== Background ==
Radio Songs consists of recordings made when performing on Garrison Keillor's NPR radio program A Prairie Home Companion. Although Robin and Linda first appeared on the show regularly in 1976, the selections on this compilation only reach as far back as 1993. Many of the tunes were not otherwise recorded by the duo and are only available on this collection. Included are collaborations with the Hopeful Gospel Quartet, Mountain Heart, Mike Seeger, Peter Ostroushko, and house musicians, Guy's All-Star Shoe Band.

== Critical reception ==
Professional ratings
Review scores
Source	Rating
Allmusic	3.5/5 stars
The News and Observer	3/5 stars

Jack Bernhardt of News and Observer said, "Radio Songs" captures the warmth and charm of Robin and Linda Williams' live shows. It draws its lessons from the past, while pulsing with relevance for modern times."

James Christopher Monger of Allmusic wrote, "the timelessness of both the music and the show itself keeps everything awash in the same sepia-tone glow. Fans who are already familiar with the duo's impressive repertoire will love having a copy of the live versions of longtime favorites, but many of the tunes on Radio Songs were performed only once, making this essential listening for devotees of both APHC and Robin & Linda Williams."

== Track listing ==
1. "Blue Ridge Cabin Home" (Louise Certain, Gladys Stacey) – 2:52
2. "By the Touch of Her Hand" (Carter) – 3:29
3. "The Other Side of Town" (Jerome Clark, Robin Williams, Linda Williams) – 3:20
4. "Things I've Learned" (Clark, Williams, Williams) – 2:48
5. "50, 000 Names" (O'Hara) – 4:04
6. "Feed My Sheep" (Traditional) – 2:41
7. "We'll Meet Again" (Hughie Charles, Ross Parker) – 2:44
8. "So It Go" (Clark, Williams, Williams) – 3:42
9. "I'll Twine Mid the Ringlets" (Maude Irving, J. P. Webster) – 4:18
10. "If the River Was Whiskey (Hesitation Blues) " (Poole) – 3:08
11. "So Long, See You Tomorrow" (Clark, Williams, Williams) – 3:40
12. "Restless One" (Jerry Clark, Dave Hull) – 4:07
13. "Home Sweet Home Medley:"
  1. "Introduction" – 0:24
  2. "Home Sweet Home" (Henry Bishop, John Howard Payne) – 0:58
  3. "A Mother's Prayer" (Traditional) – 1:47
  4. "Daddy and Home" (Elsie McWilliams, Jimmie Rodgers) – 1:24
  5. "Mom and Dad's Waltz" (Lefty Frizzell) – 1:40
  6. "Precious Memories" (Traditional) – 3:32
14. "Marvin & Mavis Smiley/Down Home Diva" (Capurro, DiCapua, Keillor) – 4:07

== Musicians ==
- Linda Williams – vocals, guitar, background vocals
- Robin Williams – vocals, guitar, background vocals
- Barry Abernathy – banjo
- Pat Donohue – guitar
- Richard Dworsky – organ, piano, arranger
- Gary Raynor – bass
- Arnie Kinsella – percussion
- Andy Stein – fiddle
- Peter Ostroushko – mandolin
- Jimmy Gaudreau – mandolin
- Steve Gulley – guitar
- Greg Hippen – bass
- Clay Jones – guitar
- Garrison Keillor – vocals
- Kate MacKenzie – vocals
- Kevin Maul – dobro
- Jason Moore – bass
- John Niemann – fiddle, mandolin
- Mike Seeger – autoharp
- Adam Steffey – mandolin
- Jim VanCleve – fiddle
- Jim Watson – bass, vocals

== Production notes ==
- Produced, mixed and mastered by Chris Frymire
- Engineered by Scott Rivard
- Photography by Dan Zimmerman and Melinda Sue Gordon
- Liner notes by Linda Williams
