= Pilgrims on the Heart Road =

Studio album by Peter Ostroushko
- Released: Mar 18, 1997
- Genre: Americana, folk
- Length: 70:48
- Label: Red House
- Producer: Peter Ostroushko

Peter Ostroushko chronology
Heart of the Heartland (1995)	Pilgrims on the Heart Road (1997)	Sacred Heart (2000)

Pilgrims on the Heart Road is an album by Peter Ostroushko, released in 1997. It is the second of the three albums Ostroushko calls his "heartland trilogy" — Heart of the Heartland, Pilgrims on the Heart Road, and Sacred Heart.

Guests include Prudence Johnson, Butch Thompson and Bobby McFerrin.

== Reception ==
Professional ratings
Review scores
Source	Rating
Allmusic	4/5 stars

Writing for Allmusic, music critic William Ruhlman complimented the instrumental work, but wrote that in contrast to Ostroushko's previous albums, this album is "...a collection of songs with vocals, songs that treat a number of personal and political issues of obvious importance to the musician and which he treats at length... Ostroushko is as determined to display his instrumental dexterity on guitar and mandolin as he is to explore the lyrical subject matter... All of this makes for an ambitious, seriously intended album that sometimes comes off as preachy and self-important, sincere as it may be."

== Track listing ==
All songs by Peter Ostroushko.

1. "Miracle" – 6:50
2. "Mandela" – 8:34
3. "Twilight of Our Years" – 6:00
4. "My People" – 6:08
5. "Down on the Plain of Reeds" – 9:30
6. "Once Again" – 6:30
7. "I'm So Glad You Came into My Life" – 6:30
8. "You Don't Know What Lonely Is" – 6:47
9. "Baby, Bring Your Sweet Lovin' to Me" – 6:44
10. "Like Memories Often Do" – 7:15

== Personnel ==
- Peter Ostroushko – vocals, guitar, mandolin, fiddle
- Prudence Johnson – vocals
- Bobby McFerrin – vocals
- Richard Dworsky – piano, Hammond organ
- Jim Anton – bass
- Dean Magraw – acoustic and electric guitar, slide guitar
- Gordon Johnson – bass, double bass
- Gordon Knudtson – drums
- Bruce Kurnow – harmonica
- Butch Thompson – clarinet
- Bruce Allard Trumpet
- Marc Anderson – percussion
- Diane Tremaine – cello
- Ed Volker – piano
- Leslie Ball – vocals
- Jearlyn Steele Battle – vocals
- Kathleen Bradford – vocals
- Pat Frederick – vocals
- Marge Ostroushko – vocals
- Karen Paurus – vocals
- Robert Robinson – vocals

== Production notes ==
- Produced and mixed by Peter Ostroushko
- Executive Producer – Eric Peltoniemi
- Craig Thorson – assistant Engineer
- Gus Gustafson, Dan Corrigan – photography
- Tom Mudge – engineer, mixing
- Lisa Ekström – design
