= Back Roads (Pat Donohue album) =

Studio album by Pat Donohue
- Released: 1996
- Studio: Hudson Forrester Studios, Minneapolis
- Genre: Jazz, pop
- Length: 42:30
- Label: Bluesky

Pat Donohue chronology
Big Blind Bluesy (1994)	Back Roads (1996)	Ye Olde Wooden Guitar Christmas (1997)

Back Roads is an album by guitarist Pat Donohue.

== Track listing ==
All songs by Pat Donohue unless otherwise noted

1. "Stealin' from Chet" (Chet Atkins, Pat Donohue) – 3:44
2. "The Road to Kingdome Come" – 3:33
3. "(The Other End Of) The Mississippi River Blues" – 4:11
4. "Baby, Can't Get Over You" – 4:13
5. "I Don't Worry 'Bout the Blues" – 4:24
6. "Touch 'Em All" – 3:04
7. "Saguaro Slide" – 2:47
8. "Love and Desire" – 4:30
9. "Nothin'" – 2:44
10. "Stumblin' Through" – 3:58
11. "Matter of Time" – 3:19
12. "Summer's End" – 2:03

== Personnel ==
- Pat Donohue – guitar, vocals, slide guitar, percussion
- Rich Dworsky – piano
- Butch Thompson – clarinet, piano
- Howard Levy – harmonica
- Chet Atkins – guitar, vocals
- Gordy Johnson – double bass
- Marc Anderson – percussion
- Kate McKenzie – harmony vocals
