= Visions of Love =

Studio album by Robin and Linda Williams
- Released: 2002
- Recorded: Hudson-Forrester Studios, Edina, MN
- Genre: Americana, folk, country
- Label: Sugar Hill Records
- Producer: Robin and Linda Williams

Robin and Linda Williams chronology
In the Company of Strangers (2000)	Visions of Love (2002)	Deeper Waters (2004)

Professional ratings
Review scores
Source	Rating
Allmusic	3/5 stars

Visions of Love is the last album of duo Robin and Linda Williams on the Sugar Hill Records label, released in 2002. They would move to Red House Records for their next release.

Visions of Love displays the Williams' A Prairie Home Companion connections with members of that show's house band, Minneapolis musician Peter Ostroushko on fiddle and mandolin plus liner notes by Garrison Keillor.

== Track listing ==
1. "I'll Twine 'Mid the Ringlets" (Maude Irving, J. P. Webster) – 4:25
2. "After the Fire Is Gone" (L. E. White) – 3:00
3. "You're Running Wild" (Ray Edenton, Donnie Winters) – 2:51
4. "Ramblin' Man" (Hank Williams) – 4:32
5. "Wasting My Time, Wasting My Love on You" (Warren) – 2:54
6. "Too Late, Too Late" (Davis) – 5:02
7. "Mississippi Delta Blues" (Neville, Rodgers) – 4:01
8. "The Blues Come Around" (Hank Williams) – 3:01
9. "Hungry Eyes" (Merle Haggard) – 4:21
10. "Wash Me in Thy Precious Blood" (Traditional) – 4:09
11. "Keep the Home Fires Burning" (Lena Guilbert Ford, Ivor Novello) – 4:25
12. "Wandering Boy" (Traditional) – 3:53
13. "If I Should Fall Behind" (Bruce Springsteen) – 3:23

== Personnel ==
- Linda Williams – vocals, banjo, guitar, background vocals
- Robin Williams – vocals, guitar, harmonica, background vocals
- Richard Dworsky – piano
- Peter Ostroushko – fiddle, mandolin
- Gary Raynor – bass

== Production notes ==
- Engineered by Sam Hudson
- Mastering by David Glaser
- Design by Sue Meyer
