= Buddies of Swing =

Studio album by Peter Ostroushko
- Released: 1987
- Genre: Swing
- Length: 44:54
- Label: Red House
- Producer: Peter Ostroushko

Peter Ostroushko chronology
| Down the Streets of My Old Neighborhood (1986) | Buddies of Swing (1987) | Blue Mesa (1989) |

Buddies of Swing is an album by fiddle and mandolin player Peter Ostroushko, released in 1987.

Professional ratings
Review scores
| Source | Rating |
|---|---|
| Allmusic | 3/5 stars |

== Track listing ==
1. "Liza (All the Clouds'll Roll Away)" (George Gershwin, Ira Gershwin, Gus Kahn) – 4:15
2. "Indifference" (Joseph Colombo, Tony Muréna) – 3:23
3. "Benny's/Pennies from Heaven" (Johnny Burke, Arthur Johnston) – 4:30
4. "Blues for Marian (Waltz of the Holsteins)" (Ostroushko) – 6:25
5. "Beaumont Rag" (Traditional) – 3:16
6. "Tico-Tico" (Jose Abreu, Ervin Drake, Aloysio Oliveira) – 2:23
7. "Bring on Some Rain" (Ostroushko) – 6:49
8. "Fats Waller Medley: Jitterbug Waltz/Ain't Misbehavin'/Lulus's Back In Town" (Dubin, Waller, Warren) – 7:24
9. "Honeysuckle Rose" (Andy Razaf, Fats Waller) – 6:29

== Personnel ==
- Peter Ostroushko – mandolin, fiddle, guitar, vocals
- Jethro Burns – mandolin
- Bruce Calin – bass
- Johnny Gimble – fiddle, mandolin
- Tim Hennessy – guitar
- Prudence Johnson – vocals
- Tom Lewis – bass
- Red Maddock – drums
- Dean Magraw – guitar
- Butch Thompson – clarinet, piano

== Production notes ==
- Peter Ostroushko – producer
- Eric Peltoniemi – producer
- Bob Feldman – executive producer
- Tom Mudge – engineer
- Marge Ostroushko – assistant producer
- John Scherf – assistant engineer
- Judy Stone Nunneley – photography
- Ann Marsden – photography
- George Ostroushko – artwork, design
