= Sedra Bistodeau =

American fiddler and violinist (born 1994)

- Born: 1994 (age 30–31) Princeton, Minnesota
- Genres: Classical, Bluegrass, Country
- Occupation(s): soloist, performer
- Instrument(s): Violin, fiddle

Sedra Bistodeau (born 1994) is an American fiddler and violinist from Princeton, Minnesota.

== Life and career ==
Sedra Bistodeau began playing the violin at age three, studying with teachers such as Margaret Haviland and Mary West at the MacPhail Center for Music in Princeton, Minnesota. She studied with Sally O'Reilly, Professor of Violin at the University of Minnesota until graduating high school and currently studies with Bettina Mussumeli at the San Francisco Conservatory of Music. She received the Mary West Violin Scholarship four years consecutively, then at age 10 won the honor to perform Max Bruch's Violin Concerto in G minor (3rd movement) as a soloist with the Little Falls Heartland Symphony. She won the top prize in the junior division of the Minnesota Sinfonia Competition, allowing her to solo with the Minnesota Sinfonia Orchestra in 2008 under the direction of Jay Fishman. In 2009, Bistodeau won the MNSOTA Mary West Solo Competition and performed solo (Sibelius Violin Concerto) with the Bloomington Orchestra. The following year, she won the MacPhail Civic Concerto Competition (and another solo performance with the Civic Orchestra) and earned first-place finishes in the Schubert Club Scholarship and the Minnesota Youth Symphony's Essay Scholarship. In 2011, Bistodeau won first place in the Thursday Musical Scholarships and was the Grand Prize winner in the Saint Cloud Symphony Concerto Competition, soloing with the Saint Cloud Symphony (Vieuxtemps Violin Concerto No. 4). In 2012, Bistodeau competed and won the YPSCA competition in Minneapolis. As a result of winning, she won the opportunity to perform with the Minnesota Orchestra, which happened in February/March 2014.

She played the third movement of Sibelius’s Violin Concerto in D minor, Op. 47. In addition to her focus on classical music, Bistodeau has spent an equal number of years on the violin art of fiddling. She has found much success in this area as well, through competitions and special guest appearances. She appears in the TV documentary The Devil's Box, completed a recording with Peter Ostroushko. Currently recognized as one of the top ten fiddlers in the United States, Bistodeau has accumulated many awards including two first-place finishes in the Junior Junior division at the National Oldtime Fiddlers' Contest and a first place at the coveted “Gone to Texas” division at the Fiddlers' Frolics in Hallettsville, Texas. She was the first female to ever win this division and the youngest competitor to win this division as well at the age of 13. She also acquired three top finishes at the Wisconsin State Championship. In 2010, Bistodeau placed fourth in the open division of the National Oldtime Fiddle Contest. In 2011, Bistodeau placed 2nd in the Grand National division at the National Fiddle Contest, and again in 2013. She has also been involved in the Western Open Fiddle Contest in Redding, California, for the previous four years. After taking a year off from competing at the Weiser National Championships, she was asked to judge the national champions in the summer of 2016. She is officially a certified national judge. In the 2005 American Heritage Music Festival's Grand Lake National Fiddle Fest, she placed first in the "Jr. Jr. Division", took first (with her sister) in the Twin Fiddle Contest, and with her family's band, took first in the Jukebox Contest. In 2009, at the age of 14, Bistodeau took first place in the Minnesota State Fair Talent Contest. In 2010, at the premiere old-time fiddling event, the National Old-Time Fiddlers Contest held annually in Weiser, Idaho, Bistodeau took first place with Alex DePue in the Twin Fiddling (duet) division. Bistodeau formerly studied classical violin under the direction of professor Sally O'Reilly of the University of Minnesota, and is a friend of conductor and musician Peter Ostroushko. Bistodeau was credited as a player—and named in a song title—on Ostroushko's 2010 album When the Last Morning Glory Blooms. She has also performed for several years with Minnesota Youth Symphonies. Bistodeau appeared as a guest performer on several episodes of A Prairie Home Companion, performing with her sister Deana Bistodeau, who is also a fiddler.
