= Life Stories =

Life Stories may refer to:

- Life Stories (Pat Donohue album), 2003
- Life Stories (Earl Klugh album), 1986
- David Attenborough's Life Stories, a British radio programme
- Life Stories (TV programme), a British television programme
- Life story work, a social work psychological intervention
- Lifestories, an American television series airing from 1990 to 1991
- Lifestories: Families in Crisis, an American television series airing from 1992 to 1996
