= Louis Jenkins (poet) =

American poet (1942–2019)

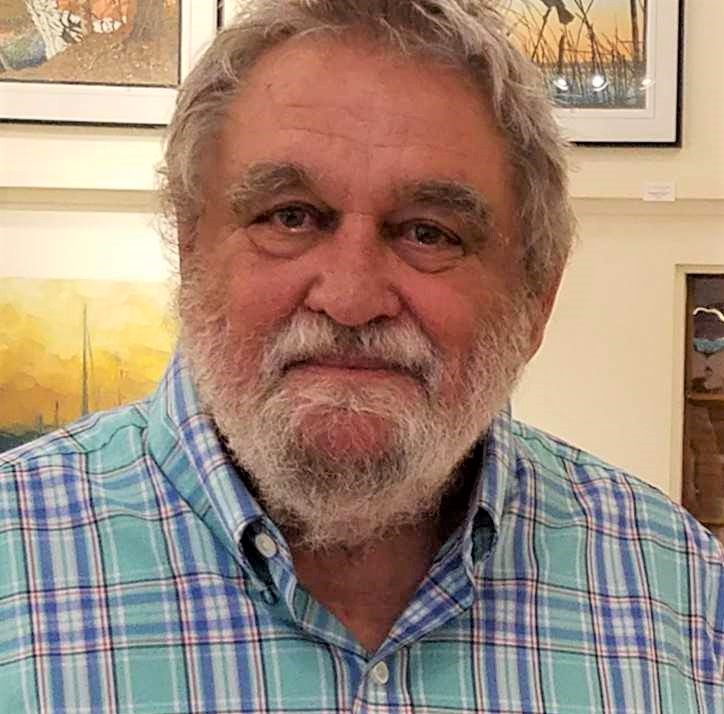
- Louis Jenkins in 2017
- Born: Louis Burke Jenkins; October 28, 1942; Enid, Oklahoma, U.S.
- Died: December 21, 2019 (aged 77); Bloomington, Minnesota, U.S.
- Occupation: Poet
- Spouses: Sandra Brashear (m. 1963; div. 1968) Ann Jacobson (m. 1970)
- Children: 1
- Writing career
- Period: 1970s–2019
- Genre: Prose poetry
- Website: louisjenkins.com

Louis Burke Jenkins (October 28, 1942 – December 21, 2019) was an American prose poet. He lived in Duluth, Minnesota, with his wife Ann for over four decades, beginning in 1971. He also lived in Bloomington, Minnesota. His poems have been published in a number of literary magazines and anthologies. Jenkins was a guest on A Prairie Home Companion numerous times and was also featured on The Writer's Almanac and on the Northern Lights TV Series.

== Personal life ==
Louis Burke Jenkins was born October 28, 1942, in Enid, Oklahoma, to Burke Jenkins and Genevieve (née Webring). He graduated Enid High School in 1960. He attended Wichita State University from 1967 to 1969. Jenkins married Sandra Brashear in 1963, divorcing in 1968, and then married the painter and professional librarian Ann Jacobson in 1970, relocating to Minnesota in 1971. He has a son named Lars.

Jenkins died at his home in Bloomington on December 21, 2019, at age 77.

== Literary awards and honors ==
Louis Jenkins’ book, Nice Fish, was winner of the Minnesota Book Award in 1995, and his book Just Above Water won the Northeastern Minnesota Book Award in 1997. Jenkins was a featured poet at the Geraldine R. Dodge Poetry Festival in 1996 and at the Aldeburgh Poetry Festival in England in 2007. He was a Bush Foundation Fellow in 1979 and 1984. He also was honored with the George Morrison award and Loft-McKnight Fellowship.

== Acting and Nice Fish with Mark Rylance ==
Jenkins appeared in the minor role of Earl in the 2016 film Blood Stripe and as a therapist in the 1964 film Lilith. Actor Mark Rylance recited works by Jenkins in lieu of formal acceptance speeches after winning a Tony Award and a Drama Desk Award for the play Boeing-Boeing in 2008 and again after winning his Tony Award for the play Jerusalem in 2011. During 2008-2013 Rylance transformed a sequence of Jenkins’ prose poems into the play Nice Fish which premiered on April 6, 2013, at the Guthrie Theater in Minneapolis. A revised production of the play opened at the American Repertory Theater in Cambridge, Massachusetts, on January 17, 2016. During the Cambridge run of Nice Fish Jenkins played the role of Wayne, a kind of Old Man Winter figure in the revised version of the play.

In April of 2026, the online entertainment newsletter Deadline Hollywood reported that Mark Rylance was set to star in and make his feature directorial debut with a film version of Nice Fish, alongside actors Jim Lichtscheidl, Isabella Star LaBlanc, and Michelle Williams; and that Tamara Birkemoe; CEO of Palisades Park Pictures, was launching international sales on the project at the upcoming Cannes Film Market, with CAA Media Finance representing North American rights. The screenplay for the film version, adapted from the stage play, is being prepared by Rylance and Lichtscheidl.

== The Mad Moonlight Art Song Project ==
In 2020 and 2021, the Schubert Club of Saint Paul, with funding from friends and admirers of Louis Jenkins, commissioned 14 Minnesota composers to set for voice and piano 57 of the 62 poems in The Mad Moonlight, the last collection of his poems published during his lifetime, as a memorial tribute. The composers selected were Carol E. Barnett, Craig Carnahan, Jake Endres, Jocelyn Hagen and Tim Takach, Linda Tutas Haugen, Ryan Johnston, Linda Kachelmeier, Libby Larsen, J. David Moore, Daniel Nass, Jonathan Posthuma, David Evan Thomas, and Jeremy Walker . The resulting art songs were premiered at Schubert Club concerts in Saint Paul, Minnesota, starting in 2021, with the final premiere taking place at a Source Song Festival recital in Minneapolis, Minnesota, on August 7, 2023. The Project was also awarded the 2023 Paul Sperry American Song Initiative Award by the Festival.

== Selected readings, interviews, and performance videos ==
Prose Poems

Louis Jenkins reads at the 1996 Minnesota Men’s Conference in Duluth, MN, introduced by Robert Bly.

Louis Jenkins reads at the 2011 Annual Pankake Poetry Reading at the University of Minnesota, Minneapolis, MN, introduced by Michael Dennis Browne.

Louis Jenkins reads his poems "My Ancestral Home," "Basement," "The Afterlife," and "Suitcase" on a 2013 broadcast of Garrison Keillor’s “A Prairie Home Companion.”

Louis Jenkins reads at the 2014 The Distinguished Poets Series at The Poetry Center in Paterson, NJ.

Mark Rylance recites "The Back Country" by Louis Jenkins at the 2008 Tony Awards Ceremony in New York City.

Mark Rylance recites "Walking Through a Wall" by Louis Jenkins at the 2011 Tony Awards Ceremony in New York City.

Nice Fish

Duluth Public Television “The Playlist” feature Louis Jenkins talks about the origin of "Nice Fish" (2013 original version) and reads "The Afterlife."

Twin Cities Public Television “Almanac” feature on the Guthrie Theater premiere production of "Nice Fish" (2013 original version).

American Repertory Theater “Interview with the Creative Team” feature on their production of "Nice Fish" (2016 revised version).

The Mad Moonlight Art Songs

Carol Barnett’s “Mad Moonlight” (settings for voice and piano of “Young Witches,” “Old Witches,” and “Bat” by Louis Jenkins; recorded at a Schubert Club concert at the Landmark Center in Saint Paul, MN on April 27, 2022, performed by mezzo-soprano Georgia Jacobson and pianist Carson Rose Schneider.

Linda Kachelmeier’s “Lake Superior Songs” (settings for voice and piano of “The Lake,” “Picnic on the Shore,” “Brighton Beach Waves,” and “Driftwood” by Louis Jenkins.); Libby Larsen’s “North Shore Songs” (settings for voice and piano of “Sauna,” “January Night 35 Below Zero,” “Lake Superior,” and “Summer Rain” by Louis Jenkins); David Evan Thomas’s “In the Mad Moonlight” (settings for voice and piano of “Oklahoma,” “Drip" aka "Water," “Chekov and Heisenberg,” and “Hey Diddle Diddle” by Louis Jenkins); Daniel Nass’s “Animal Songs” (settings for voice and piano of “Knock Knock,” “Great Grey Owl,” “Website,” “The Wolf,” and “Squirrel” by Louis Jenkins); recorded at the College of St. Scholastica's Mitchell Auditorium in Duluth, MN, on September 15, 2023, performed by mezzo-soprano Clara Osowski and pianist Jessica Schroeder.

== Selected bibliography ==
=== Books ===
- Collected Poems (Will o' the Wisp Books, 2023)
- The Mad Moonlight: Poems (Will o' the Wisp Books, 2019)
- Where Your House Is Now: New and Selected Prose Poems (Nodin Press, 2019)
- In the Sun Out of the Wind (Will o' the Wisp Books, 2017)
- Tin Flag: New and Selected Poems (Will o' the Wisp Books, 2013)
- Before You Know It: Prose Poems 1970-2005 (Will o' the Wisp Books, 2009)
- European Shoes (Will o' the Wisp Books, 2008)
- North of the Cities (Will o' the Wisp Books, 2007)
- Four Places on Lake Superior’s North Shore (Red Dragonfly Press, 2005)
- Distance From the Sun (Minnesota Center for the Book Arts, 2004)
- Sea Smoke (Holy Cow! Press, 2004)
- The Winter Road (Holy Cow! Press, 2000)
- Just Above Water (Holy Cow! Press, 1997)
- Nice Fish: New and Selected Prose Poems (Holy Cow! Press, 1995)
- All Tangled Up With the Living (Nineties Press, 1991)
- An Almost Human Gesture (Eighties Press and Ally Press, 1987)
- Will Small: The Journey (White Pine Press, 1987)
- The Water's Easy Reach:Prose Poems (White Pine Press, 1985)
- The Well Digger's Wife (Minnesota Writer's Publishing House Booklet No. 2, 1973)

=== Anthologies ===
- Good Poems for Hard Times Garrison Keillor, ed. (Viking, 2005)
- Great American Prose Poems David Lehman, ed. (Scribner, 2003)
- Poetry 180 Billy Collins, ed. (Random House, 2003)
- No Boundaries: Prose Poems by 24 American Prose Poets (Tupelo Press, 2003)
- Are You Experienced? (University of Iowa Press, 2003)
- Stories From Where We Live (Milkweed Editions, 2003)
- Good Poems Garrison Keillor, ed. (Viking, 2002)
- The Thousands, Number One (Thousands Press, 2001)
- The Best of the Prose Poem (Providence College, Providence, RI, 2000)
- The Best American Poetry 1999 David Lehman, ed. (Scribner, 1999)
- Literature and Its Writers (Bedford Books, Boston, 1997)
- The Plain Truth of Things (HarperCollins, 1997)
- The Party Train: A Collection North American Prose Poetry (New Rivers Press, 1996)
- Literature: The Evolving Canon Sven Birkerts, ed. (Allyn and Bacon, 1993)
- Men of Our Time (University of Georgia Press, 1992)
- The Rag and Bone Shop of the Heart Bly, Hillman and Meade, eds.(HarperCollins, 1992)
- Reading Rooms (Doubleday,1991)
- The Best of Crazyhorse (University of Arkansas Press, 1990)
- Minnesota Writes: Poetry (Milkweed Books, 1987)
- News of the Universe: Poems of Twofold Consciousness Robert Bly, ed. (Sierra Club Books, 1980)
- Heartland II: Poets of the Midwest (Northern Illinois University Press, 1975)

=== Audio recordings ===
- Any Way in the World (Thousands Press, 2000)

=== Plays ===
- Nice Fish (with Mark Rylance, 2013, Guthrie Theater)
