= St. Ann's Warehouse =

Performing arts institution in Brooklyn, New York

Coordinates: 40.70400°N 73.9865°W

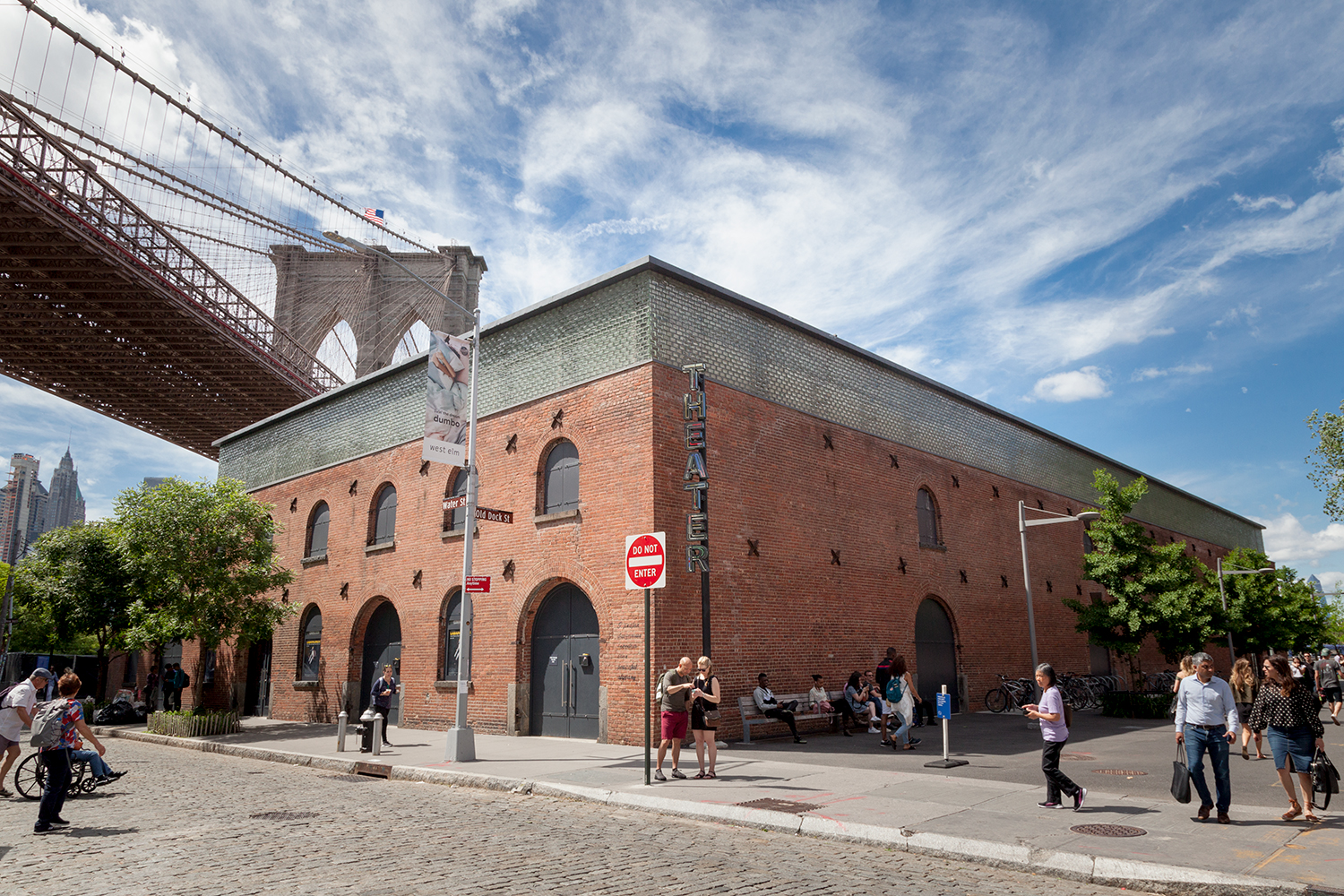
- Interactive map of St. Ann's Warehouse
- Address: 45 Water Street; Brooklyn, New York; United States
- Capacity: 1000

Construction
- Opened: 1980

Website
- www.stannswarehouse.org

St. Ann's Warehouse is a performing arts organization in Brooklyn, New York City. It began when St. Ann's and the Holy Trinity Church on Montague Street began presenting music and performances in its historic sanctuary in 1980. Initially known as Arts at St. Ann's, proceeds from the stage's performances were used to aid in renovating the building.

In 2000, it relocated to a former spice milling factory in Dumbo, Brooklyn, where it has served as a stage for musicians such as David Bowie, Lou Reed, Joe Strummer, Aimee Mann, Nick Cave, Rufus Wainwright and John Cale. Theatrical shows have included the Bertholt Brecht/Kurt Weill musical The Seven Deadly Sins, starring Marianne Faithfull. The current building can accommodate audiences of up to 1500 people.

St. Ann's Warehouse moved to the historic Tobacco Warehouse in Brooklyn Bridge Park in 2015.

== Origin and inception ==
The original home of Arts at St. Ann's (now St. Ann's Warehouse) was the National Historic Landmark St. Ann's and the Holy Trinity Church on Montague Street in Brooklyn Heights. For 21 years, St. Ann's presented a broad array of concert and theater performances in the church's Gothic Revival sanctuary. In addition, the organization raised approximately $4 million for the building's restoration, including its historic stained glass windows, reportedly the first made in America.

Beginning in 1980, much of St. Ann's early programming was based on classical music — choral and opera programs, noonday organ recitals, performances by Tashi, The Academy of Ancient Music, and others. St. Ann's had a surprising and defining early success with its staging of the first American puppet opera, Amy Trompetter's production of Rossini's The Barber of Seville, with the Brooklyn Opera Society in 1983. Trompetter's production was revived on its 20th anniversary at St. Ann's Warehouse in 2003. In 2007, it played again to sold-out houses in a new German version at the Festspielhaus St. Pölten, the capital city of Lower Austria.

The Chamber Music Society of Lincoln Center offered preview concerts at St. Ann's from 1981–1983, which then led to Bach Cantata Sundays. The seven-year cantata series proved instrumental in forming St. Ann's genre-defying approach to music programming and helped build the reputation of The Orchestra of St. Luke's, then a new band.

In 1985, Bread and Puppet Theater was invited to stage Bach's Cantata #4 ("Christ lag in Todesbanden") as part of the series. By 1988, the program included the American Premiere of John Cale's The Falklands Suite. The following year, St. Ann's and the Brooklyn Academy of Music instigated the reunion of Cale and Lou Reed by commissioning Songs for Drella, their celebrated song cycle in remembrance of Andy Warhol.

== History ==
=== 1990s ===
The Seven Deadly Sins lead to the sextet, Hudson Shad, and the award-winning production of Susan Feldman's In the Time of the Comedian Harmonists (1992), which went on to enjoy a long life as Band in Berlin, co-directed by Pat Birch, Associate Director and Choreographer Jonathan Cerullo, including a brief stint on Broadway in 1999.

On the occasion of its 10th anniversary, Rolling Stone dubbed St. Ann's "the guiding light in New York's avant-rock scene."

In 1991, Willner and St. Ann's presented the first of its thematic multi-artist performances, Greetings from Tim Buckley, which inspired the late Jeff Buckley. This was followed by several Halloween programs, including Nevermore: Readings from Edgar Allan Poe and the Harry Smith Project in 1999, which featured Nick Cave, Van Dyke Parks, Rufus Wainright, Thurston Moore, and others.

St. Ann's enjoyed further success with thematic concerts led by music director Peter Holsapple, including Bryter Layter: Music of Nick Drake (1997), Listen Listen: Music of Sandy Denny (1998) and Songs of the Century (1999) with Beth Orton and Jimmie Dale Gilmore.

Other events that took place in the old building were St. Ann's commissions of Bill Frisell Plays For Buster Keaton (1992–1993), scores for six of the master's silent films; August Wilson & the Blues (1996), which brought together the Pulitzer Prize-winning playwright with the musician Olu Dara, and David Greenberger's The Duplex Planet Radio Hour, produced for WNYC-FM in 1994. St. Ann's finally closed the door on St. Ann's Church in 2000 with Roy Nathason's jazz suite, Fire at Keaton's Bar and Grill, featuring Elvis Costello and Deborah Harry, and cartoonist Art Spiegelman's Three Panel Opera: Drawn to Death.

=== 2000s ===
After moving to an old spice milling factory at 38 Water Street in Dumbo shortly after the September 11 attacks in 2001, Arts at St. Ann's became St. Ann's Warehouse. Highlighted by performances that mix theater and rock and roll, the programming featured multiple collaborations with The Wooster Group: To You, The Birdie (2002), Brace Up! (2003), House/Lights (2005), The Emperor Jones (2006) and Hamlet (2007), Ridge Theater's Jennie Richee (2003), Decasia (2004); Joe Strummer's final New York appearances (2002), David Bowie (2002), Aimee Mann (2004), as well as intimate concerts with Laurie Anderson and Lou Reed (2002), Oscar Wilde's Salome: The Reading (2002) with Al Pacino, directed by Estelle Parsons, and the 20th anniversary production of Amy Trompetter's puppet opera, The Barber of Seville (May 2003), conducted by Kristjan Järvi with the Absolute Ensemble.

In 2004, St. Ann's and Artistic Director, Susan Feldman, were honored by the Village Voice Obie Committee with the Ross Wetzsteon Memorial Award for the development of new work, recognizing St. Ann's Warehouse as "a sleek venue where its super-informed audience charges the atmosphere with hip vitality." Productions included Mabou Mines' DollHouse, directed by Lee Breuer; Dan Hurlin's lyrical puppet masterwork, Hiroshima Maiden, Cynthia Hopkins' alt-country opera Accidental Nostalgia, and Turning with live video by Charles Atlas and music by Antony of Antony and the Johnsons.

In 2005 St. Ann's welcomed London's Royal Court Theatre with its productions of Sarah Kane's 4.48 Psychosis, directed by the James MacDonald, and Poland's TR Warszawa production of Risk Everything directed by Grzegorz Jarzyna. That year, St. Ann's produced a series of live, onstage "sound plays" with Sirius Satellite Radio, South Bank Centre, and UCLA Live!, called Theater of the New Ear, a collaboration between composer Carter Burwell and filmmakers Charlie Kaufman and the Coen Brothers' Sawbones, Hope Leaves the Theater. "Sawbones" featured Steve Buscemi, John Goodman, Marcia Gay Harden, Philip Seymour Hoffman, John Slattery, Brooke Smith, and "Hope" featured Hope Davis, Peter Dinklage, and Meryl Streep. A second Charlie Kaufman play, "Anomalisa", which played at UCLA Live! only starred Jennifer Jason Leigh], Tom Noonan, and David Thewlis.

St. Ann's celebrated its 25th anniversary with a new presentation of Roy Nathanson's Fire at Keaton's Bar & Grill, featuring Deborah Harry, Lou Reed, Laurie Anderson, Antony, Chocolate Genius, Nellie McKay, Theo Bleckmann, Dan Zanes, and others.

In 2006/2007, St. Ann's produced two World Premieres: Lou Reed's Berlin, directed by Julian Schnabel, which traveled to the Sydney Festival, Australia and subsequently toured 14 European cities in summer 2007; and Part 2 of Cynthia Hopkins' Accidental Trilogy, Must Don't Whip 'Um. St. Ann's received four Drama Desk Award nominations for its productions of Les Freres Corbusier's Hell House and Daniel Kramer's Woyzeck in 2006. The season ended with Hal Willner's Rogues Gallery Live, a gala benefit concert, featuring Bryan Ferry, Gavin Friday, Lou Reed, Laurie Anderson, Janine Nichols, Jennie Muldaur, Kembra, Baby Gramps, Antony, and others.

In 2009, a plan was announced to convert and move to a Tobacco Warehouse at 45 Water Street, but those plans were delayed by legal disputes. Beginning with the Fall 2012 season, St. Ann's moved to a 19,000 square foot industrial space at 29 Jay Street. In Fall 2013, they were able to break ground on the Tobacco Warehouse site, which opened in Fall 2015.

In recent years, St. Ann's Warehouse has activated two found warehouse spaces as theaters in DUMBO, where the organization has hosted companies such as the National Theatre of Scotland, Kneehigh and Druid Theaters, Poland's TR Warszawa, as well as The Wooster Group and Mabou Mines. It has become an artistic home to theater makers such as Enda Walsh ("The Walworth Farce", "Penelope", "Misterman" with Cillian Murphy); John Tiffany and Steven Hoggett ("Black Watch" and "Let the Right One In"), director Emma Rice ("Brief Encounter", "Tristan & Yseult") and Grzegorz Jarzyna, whose outdoor "Macbeth" was staged in a former Tobacco Warehouse on the waterfront. In 2014, St. Ann's began the development of that same Tobacco Warehouse as a permanent home for the next fifty years. The new St. Ann's Warehouse opened its doors in Fall 2015. The Marvel Architects-designed structure won a 2016 American Institute of Architects New York Chapter Design Award.

Taylor Mac presented A 24-Decade History of Popular Music in which judy presents a 24-hour performance that covers popular music in the United States from 1776–2016. This presentation received a Special Citation from the Obie Awards presented by the American Theatre Wing. This production was also a finalist for the Pulitzer Prize for Drama.

== Notable productions ==
Year	Title	Playwright	Director	Cast	Ref.
2015	Henry IV	William Shakespeare	Phyllida Lloyd	Harriet Walter	
2016	Nice Fish	Mark Rylance and Louis Jenkins	Claire van Kampen	Mark Rylance and Jim Lichtscheidl	
2016	A Streetcar Named Desire	Tennessee Williams	Benedict Andrews	Gillian Anderson, Ben Foster and Vanessa Kirby	
2017	The Tempest	William Shakespeare	Phyllida Lloyd	Harriet Walter	
2018	The Jungle	Joe Robertson and Joe Murphy	Stephen Daldry and Justin Martin		
2020	Hamlet	William Shakespeare	Yaël Farber	Ruth Negga	
2021	Medicine	Edna Walsh	Edna Walsh	Domhnall Gleeson	
2024	The Hunt	David Farr	David Farr and Rupert Goold	Tobias Menzies	
2025	Anna Christie	Eugene O'Neill	Thomas Kail	Michelle Williams, Tom Sturridge, and Brian d'Arcy James	

== The Intersection of Theater and Rock and Roll ==
Throughout its existence, St. Ann's has presented a wide variety of concerts, including rock, jazz, world and roots music especially, and using its rising reputation to introduce new and overlooked artists to growing audiences. Among the most memorable performances include: Les Mysteres Des Voix Bulgares (1988), Aaron Neville's first solo shows (1988–1989), Marta Sebestyen with Muzikas (1989), Richard Thompson, Dr. John, Garth Hudson, Vic Chesnutt, Peter Blegvad, Victoria Williams, Jimmy Scott, Robin Holcomb, Jimmie Dale Gilmore, Del McCoury, and the World Saxophone Quartet with Fontella Bass.

Aaron Neville, David Byrne and Richard Thompson, Emmylou Harris, Rosanne Cash, and Jackson Browne performed benefit concerts. Rare performances by Terry Allen, Michael Ventura and Butch Hancock, John Cale and Bob Neuwirth, Jeff Buckley and Mary Margaret O'Hara also took place, as well as St. Ann's production of David Byrne's orchestral music for "The Forest" at Town Hall in 1992.

St. Ann's has also featured blues artists. In 1989, The Mississippi Delta Blues Festival featured some rare New York performances. The Piano Blues Who's Who (1990) explored the rhythmic distinctions between New Orleans and Chicago blues traditions. A celebration of the Music of the Mississippi Hill Country, featuring Lucinda Williams and Othar Turner, among others, was the debut performance at St. Ann's Warehouse in 2001.

St. Ann's has also long been a patron of puppetry. For years, Bread and Puppet Theater appeared annually. Mabou Mines' director Lee Breuer staged the first Peter and Wendy at St. Ann's in 1992. Janie Geiser and Dan Hurlin were the prime movers behind The Lab, St. Ann's experimental haven for artists working in puppet theater. The Lab will be celebrating its 20th anniversary in 2017. Now under the direction of Matt Acheson, The Lab concludes each spring with Labapalooza!, a mini-festival of new works developed by Lab participants.

Between its years at the Church and in the warehouses in DUMBO, St. Ann's programming has continued at the intersection where theater meets Rock and Roll. Whereas Music led the programming in the Church, Theater has taken the lead in the warehouses. However, while the balance may have shifted and the canvas expanded, the rock and roll heart of the programming remains at the center of St. Ann's sensibility and its artists.
