= Sacred Heart (Peter Ostroushko album) =

Studio album by Peter Ostroushko
- Released: April 11, 2000
- Genre: Americana, folk
- Length: 57:44
- Label: Red House
- Producer: Peter Ostroushko

Peter Ostroushko chronology
Pilgrims on the Heart Road (1997)	Sacred Heart (2000)	Meeting on Southern Soil (2002)

Sacred Heart is an album by Peter Ostroushko, released in 2000. It is the final part of the trilogy Ostroushko calls his "heartland trilogy" — Heart of the Heartland, Pilgrims on the Heart Road, and Sacred Heart. In contrast to the first two albums, Sacred Heart is completely instrumental.

== Reception ==
Professional ratings
Review scores
Source	Rating
Allmusic	4/5 stars

In his review for Allmusic, critic William Ruhlmann stated "Sacred Heart is always presenting different styles to the listener, even within the same piece, and each seems fully realized before giving way to the next. It's a multi-course meal that keeps surprising the palate and leaves the listener feeling satisfied but not overstuffed."

== Track listing ==
All songs by Peter Ostroushko.

1. "Boston" – 6:16
2. "Sacred Heart, Pts. 1 & 2" – 11:13
3. "Puckett's Farewell" – 4:38
4. "Lafayette" – 7:00
5. "Even the Ravens Mourn Over You" – 3:13
6. "Three Crows" – 3:58
7. "Tatiana's Lament" – 4:22
8. "Sloboda" – 6:58
9. "Medicine Bow" – 5:17
10. "Madison" – 4:49

== Personnel ==
- Peter Ostroushko – guitar, mandolin, fiddle
- Dean Magraw – guitar
- Joel Sayles – bass
- Gordon Knudtson – drums
- Bruce Allard – violin, viola
- Marc Anderson – percussion
- Jimi Englund – percussion
- Dirk Freymuth – guitar
- Ken Holmen – saxophone
- Bruce Kurnow – harmonica
- Ruth Mackenzie – voices
- Mike Nelson – trombone
- Steve Strand – trumpet
- Diane Tremaine – cello

== Production notes ==
- Produced, arranged, conducted and mixed by Peter Ostroushko
- Executive producer – Bob Feldman
- Engineered and mixed by Rob Genedak
- Mastered by David Glasser
- Liner notes by Peter White
