= Heart of the Heartland =

Studio album by Peter Ostroushko
- Released: 1995
- Genre: Americana, folk
- Length: 52:05
- Label: Red House
- Producer: Peter Ostroushko

Peter Ostroushko chronology
Duo (1991)	Heart of the Heartland (1995)	Pilgrims on the Heart Road (1997)

Heart of the Heartland is the first album in Peter Ostroushko's "heartland trilogy", released in 1995. Pilgrims on the Heart Road and Sacred Heart complete the trilogy.

Music from Heart of the Heartland was used by Ken Burns for the PBS documentary Lewis & Clark: The Journey of the Corps of Discovery and his arrangement of "Sweet Betsy from Pike" was used in Burns' Mark Twain. "Dakota Themes" are a series of pieces Peter originally wrote and recorded for the PBS documentary "The Dakota Conflict" (1993) directed by Kristian Berg. The melody for "Kaposia" (a Dakota village on the Mississippi River near present-day St. Paul, Minnesota) is a variation on a Native American flute piece Peter learned from Dakota flute player Kevin Locke's rendition of "Zuni Sunrise". Music from the album was also later featured in the film Into The Wild (2007).

Professional ratings
Review scores
Source	Rating
Allmusic	3/5 stars

== Track listing ==
All songs by Peter Ostroushko unless otherwise noted.

1. "Seattle (The Fantasy Reel)" – 7:20
2. "Prairie Sunrise" – 3:26
3. "Puppy Belly Dance" – 5:07
4. "Montana" – 4:50
5. "Dakota Themes: Kasposia/Pioneer Waltz/Pigs Eye Reel" – 5:48
6. "Heart of the Heartland" – 3:26
7. "Nicaragua (Prelude and Dance)" – 8:30
8. "Sweet Betsy from Pike" (Traditional) – 5:03
9. "Virginia Reel from Hell Medley: Spotted Pony/Mississippi Reel/Wrystra" (Ostroushko, Traditional) – 5:00
10. "(Twilight on) The Sangre de Cristos" – 3:35

== Personnel ==
- Peter Ostroushko – mandolin, fiddle
- Richard Dworsky – piano, Hammond organ
- Dean Magraw – guitar
- Gordon Johnson – bass
- Bruce Kurnow – harmonica
- Cecilia Rossiter - cello
- Sarah Lewis – cello
- Marc Anderson – percussion
- David Bullock – violin

== Production notes ==
- Produced and mixed by Peter Ostroushko
- Bob Feldman – executive producer
- Engineered and mixed by Tom Mudge
- Artwork and design by George Ostroushko
- Photography by Dan Corrigan
