= Nice Fish =

2016 play by Mark Rylance and Louis Jenkins

- Original language: English
- Written by: Mark Rylance, Louis Jenkins
- Genre: Comedy

Premiere
- Date: 6 April 2013
- Place: Guthrie Theater

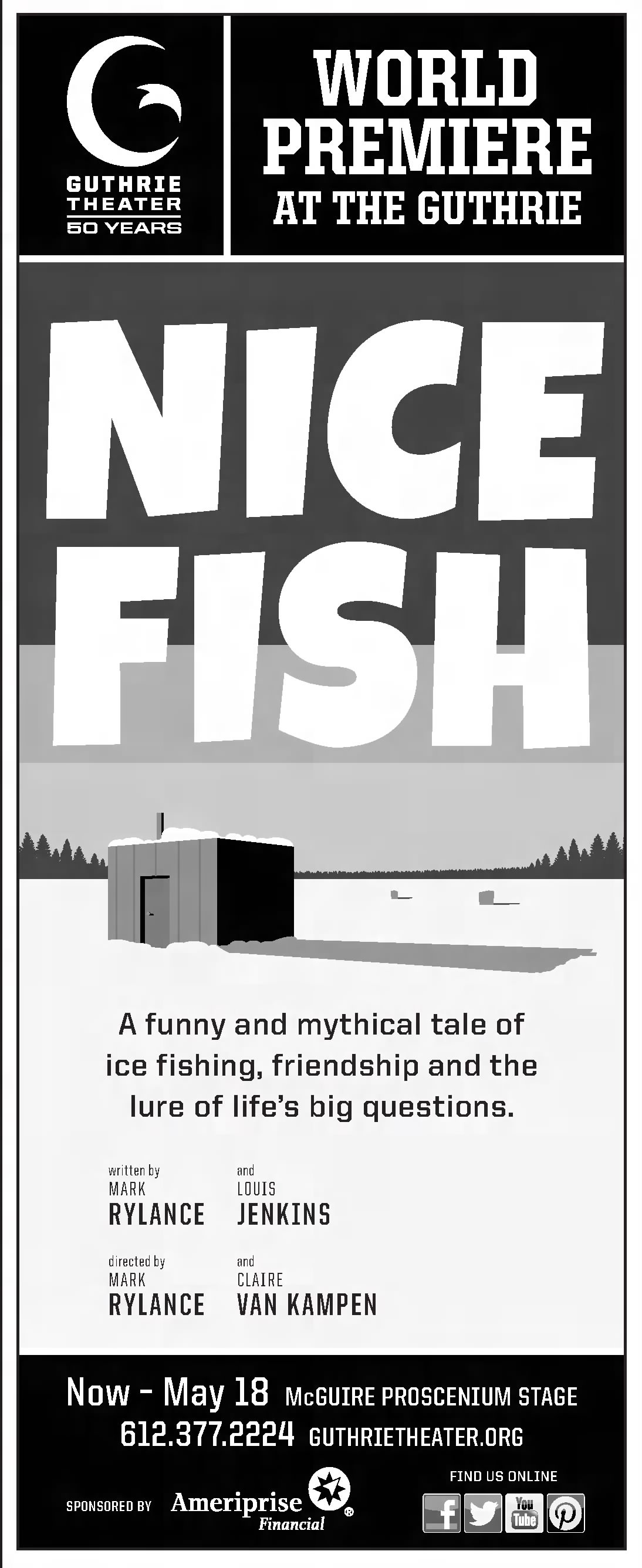
2013 newspaper ad for the Guthrie Theater premiere in Minneapolis

Nice Fish is a 2013 play by Mark Rylance, co-written with Louis Jenkins and adapted from poems by the latter. It received its world premiere production at the Guthrie Theater in Minneapolis, opening on April 6, 2013, and ran through May 18, 2013. The original production was directed by Rylance and Claire van Kampen (who also contributed original music) and featured Rylance as Ron as well as actors Jim Lichtscheidl as Eric, Emily Swallow as Flo and Chris Carlson as Wayne. The cast also included Bob Davis as DNR Officer and Tyson Forbes as Wainwright.

The genesis of the play was revealed in a 2016 New Yorker feature: "Nice Fish began with a foray on the ice. In the winter of 2008, Rylance played the title role in a production of Peer Gynt, at the Guthrie Theatre in Minneapolis. There was an interval between performances, and a few friends invited him to go ice fishing. Van Kampen went too, but the wind knocked her over. In New York a few months later, Rylance came across Jenkins’s poems and recalled that day on the ice in Minnesota. ‘I just liked the poems tremendously,’ he said. ‘They made me laugh, but underneath there was a deep melancholy, a blue note that appealed to me.’"

After the 2013 Minneapolis premiere, Rylance decided the original three-act version of Nice Fish needed trimming, as he said in a 2016 article: “’I added too much,’ [Rylance] conceded. The play would be more powerful, he resolved, if he shaved off the majority of his own dialogue, leaving only essential connective tissue between the poems.”

A revised version of the play starring Rylance and directed by Claire van Kampen received its premiere production at the American Repertory Theater in Cambridge, Massachusetts, on January 17, 2016, and then transferred to St. Ann's Warehouse, New York, on 14 February 2016, running until 27 March 2016.

The revised version of the play was also staged at the Harold Pinter Theatre in London in November 2016 and ran until February 2017. The London run received media attention when it was announced that four free tickets would be available at each performance to anyone who dressed up as a fisherman or fish. The play was nominated for the Laurence Olivier Award for Best New Comedy.

In the longer, original version of the play (released in 2013), three of the supporting roles reflected comic versions of characters from Richard Wagner's opera Das Rheingold, since Rylance had recently seen the opera and saw Wagner's use of Norse gods as representing various Jungian archetypes. Rylance also consulted with the Jungian psychologist James Hillman while creating the text for Nice Fish. The character Flo (who pops out of a fishhouse in a bikini) was a stand-in for the goddess Freia (aka Freyja), while Flo's boyfriend Wayne and his brother Wainwright offered parody versions of Wagner's giants Fafner and Fasolt (who abduct Freia in Das Rheingold). In the shorter 2016 revised version the Wagnerian overtones were removed and the character Wainwright was cut. Flo remained a somewhat younger Freia-like figure, perhaps representing Spring or Persephone, while Wayne became Flo's grandfather, not her boyfriend, and more of an Old Man Winter figure. During the American Repertory Theater run of the play in Cambridge, Massachusetts, in January 2016, Louis Jenkins joined the cast and performed the role of Wayne.

In April of 2026, the online entertainment newsletter Deadline Hollywood reported that Mark Rylance was set to star in and make his feature directorial debut with a film version of Nice Fish, alongside actors Jim Lichtscheidl, Isabella Star LaBlanc, and Michelle Williams; and that Tamara Birkemoe; CEO of Palisades Park Pictures, was launching international sales on the project at the upcoming Cannes Film Market, with CAA Media Finance representing North American rights. The screenplay for the film version, adapted from the stage play, is being prepared by Rylance and Lichtscheidl.
