= Blue Mesa =

Blue Mesa may refer to:

- Blue Mesa Dam, an earthfill dam on the Gunnison River in Colorado
- Blue Mesa Reservoir, the largest body of water entirely in Colorado
- Blue Mesa (album), a 1989 album by Peter Ostroushko
