= When the Last Morning Glory Blooms =

Studio album by Peter Ostroushko
- Released: May 18, 2010
- Recorded: Wild Sound Recording Studio
- Genre: Americana, folk
- Length: 42:01
- Label: Red House
- Producer: Peter Ostroushko

Peter Ostroushko chronology
The Mando Boys Live: Holstein Lust (2006)	When the Last Morning Glory Blooms (2010)

When the Last Morning Glory Blooms is an album by American musician Peter Ostroushko, released in 2010.

== History ==
A collection of nine waltzes and one ballad, many of the songs were written by Ostroushko for family and friends that he didn't expect to record. The title song was one he had written and played once on A Prairie Home Companion, and never played again.

== Reception ==
Professional ratings
Review scores
Source	Rating
Allmusic	3.5/5 stars

In his Allmusic review, music critic Jeff Tamarkin wrote

There's a quiet elegance and an undeniable timelessness embedded in the ten songs that comprise When the Last Morning Glory Blooms, as if Peter Ostroushko didn't so much write them as discover them, lying around undisturbed for a hundred years, on yellowed sheet music atop a forgotten parlor piano in some dusty attic... Ostroushko avoids flourish and the ostentatious; his technique on both mandolin and fiddle is the definition of virtuosity, but that's never what it's about for him. Ostroushko's purpose in brandishing an instrument isn't to dazzle with flash and style but to communicate as directly as possible, both with his fellow players and his listeners, and he accomplishes that easily here... Ostroushko displays, not for the first time and surely not for the last, why the praises never stop coming his way.

== Track listing ==
All songs by Peter Ostroushko unless otherwise noted.

1. "Maycomb, Alabama 1936" – 4:52
2. "When the Last Morning Glory Blooms" – 5:26
3. "The B and B Waltz" – 3:57
4. "Napoleon Crossing the Alps" (Traditional) – 4:01
5. "The Nine Years Waltz" (Norman Blake) – 3:33
6. "Down Where the River Bends" – 5:50
7. "Marjorie's Waltz #4" – 3:48
8. "The A and A Waltz" – 4:31
9. "Waltz for Sedra" – 2:37
10. "Memories of Tyler, Texas" – 3:26

== Personnel ==
- Peter Ostroushko – mandolin, fiddle
- Diane Tremaine – cello
- Sedra Bistodeau – fiddle
- Nancy Blake – cello ("The Nine Years Waltz")
- Norman Blake – guitar ("The Nine Years Waltz")
- Joel Sayles – bass
- Dan Chouinard – accordion, piano
- Pat Donohue – guitar, slide guitar
- Richard Dworsky – piano
- Dick Gimble – guitar
- Johnny Gimble – fiddle
- Beatrice Blanc – violin
- Michael Sutton – violin
- Sabina Thatcher – viola
- Sarah Lewis – cello

Production notes:

- Peter Ostroushko – producer, mixing, arranger
- Executive producer – Eric Peltoniemi
- David Hammonds – engineer
- David Middlebrook Engineer
- Matthew Zimmerman – engineer, mastering, mixing
- Anna Kim Ostroushko – photography
- Daniel Corrigan – photography
- Jon Reischl – cover art
