= Coming Down from Red Lodge =

Studio album by Peter Ostroushko
- Released: March 11, 2003
- Genre: Americana, folk
- Label: Red House
- Producer: Peter Ostroushko

Peter Ostroushko chronology
Meeting on Southern Soil (2002)	Coming Down from Red Lodge (2003)	Minnesota: A History of the Land (2005)

Coming Down from Red Lodge is an album by American musician Peter Ostroushko, released in 2003.

All the songs were written for performance on A Prairie Home Companion. Guests include Pat Donohue and Greg Leisz.

== Reception ==
Professional ratings
Review scores
Source	Rating
Allmusic	4/5 stars

Sing Out! stated in its Summer 2003 review: "Ostroushko, like Antonín Dvořák and Aaron Copland before him is able to grasp the kernel of music at the center of "the American experience", and transform it into a larger, more colorful whole... Coming Down from Red Lodge is destined to become one of Ostroushko's most popular recordings."

Writing for Allmusic, music critic Chris Nickson wrote the album is "a perfect illustration of his breadth and instrumental virtuosity on both fiddle and mandolin... The only track that doesn't really work is "Hymn: Page 9/11", perhaps because the emotions involved remain too fresh to be put into notes. With that caveat, this is one of Ostroushko's best releases — and that statement alone is no small praise, given his stature as one of the American greats."

== Track listing ==
All songs by Peter Ostroushko.

1. "Coming Down from Red Lodge" – 2:26
2. "(Peter's Most Excellent) Trip to Donegal" – 4:35
3. "Teelin Bay Waltz" – 3:29
4. "President George W. Bush's Hornpipe" – 2:30
5. "New Smyrna Serenade" – 3:50
6. "Cashdollar Blues" – 3:15
7. "East Texas Waltz" – 4:20
8. "Topanga Canyon Strut" – 4:30
9. "Reel Medley: The Four-Faced Liar/Baggett Street/The Witches' Kitchen" – 4:50
10. "Hymn: Page 9/11" – 4:42

== Personnel ==
- Peter Ostroushko – mandolin, fiddle, mandola
- Marc Anderson – percussion
- Gary Raynor – bass
- Joel Sayles – bass
- Andy Stein – fiddle, saxophone
- Diane Tremaine – cello
- Pat Donohue – guitar
- Dirk Freymuth – bouzouki, guitar
- Arnie Kinsella – drums, cowbell, percussion
- Dan Newton – accordion
- Greg Leisz – guitar, lap steel guitar

== Production notes ==
- Peter Ostroushko – producer, liner Notes, mixing
- Eric Peltoniemi – executive producer
- Rick Cunha – engineer
- Sam Hudson – engineer, mixing
- David Glasser – mastering
- Carla Leighton – design
- Ann Marsden – photography
