= Freewayman =

Studio album by Pat Donohue
- Released: March 18, 2008
- Genre: Folk
- Label: Bluesky Records
- Producer: Pat Donohue

Pat Donohue chronology
Profile (2005)	Freewayman (2008)

Freewayman is an album by American guitarist Pat Donohue, released in 2008. After three albums with ensemble players and guest musicians, Donohue released the entirely solo Freewayman.

== Track listing ==
All songs by Pat Donohue unless otherwise noted

1. "Freewayman" – 2:18
2. "Big Bill Special" – 2:49
3. "Butch's Blues" – 3:29
4. "Nordeast Rag" – 3:29
5. "Whole Lotta You" – 3:41
6. "The Girl I Left Behind" (Traditional) – 2:12
7. "2nd St. Blues" – 3:15
8. "Mountain Air" – 2:58
9. "Starlight" – 2:55
10. "Cypress Grove Blues" (Skip James) – 4:02
11. "Drivin' Blues" – 2:27
12. "Saguaro Slide" – 2:21
13. "Stompin' at the Savoy" (Benny Goodman, Edgar Sampson, Chick Webb) – 3:32
14. "Boogie Woogie Dance" (Tampa Red) – 2:50

== Personnel ==
- Pat Donohue – guitar, vocals

== Production notes ==
- Matthew Zimmerman – engineer, mastering
- Mary Ellen LaMotte – photography
