= Big Blind Bluesy =

Studio album by Pat Donohue
- Released: 1994
- Studio: Hudson-Forrester Studio, Minneapolis
- Genre: Folk
- Length: 40:04
- Label: Bluesky

Pat Donohue chronology
Two Hand Band (1993)	Big Blind Bluesy (1994)	Back Roads (1996)

Big Blind Bluesy is an album by American guitarist Pat Donohue that was released in 1994.

== Track listing ==
1. "Trouble in Mind" (Richard M. Jones) – 3:39
2. "I Never Cried" (Teddy Darby) – 3:03
3. "Long Tall Mama" (Big Bill Broonzy) – 3:09
4. "Michigan Water" (Jelly Roll Morton, Clarence Williams) – 4:29
5. "Too Tight Rag" (Blind Blake) – 3:00
6. "Blind Lemon Extract" (Pat Donohue) – 3:23
7. "Statesboro Blues" (Blind Willie McTell) – 3:35
8. "St. Louis Blues" (W. C. Handy) – 4:21
9. "Old Lady" (Donohue) – 1:27
10. "Weeping Willow Blues" (Blind Boy Fuller) – 2:58
11. "Kind Hearted Woman" (Robert Johnson) – 3:58
12. "Big Blind Bluesy" (Donohue) – 3:02

== Personnel ==
- Pat Donohue – guitar
