= Claire van Kampen =

English director and composer (1953–2025)

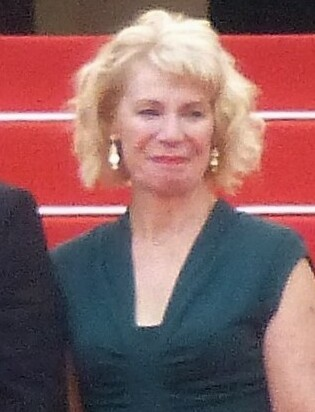
- Van Kampen in 2016
- Born: 3 November 1953; Marylebone, London, England
- Died: 18 January 2025 (aged 71); Kassel, Hesse, Germany
- Occupations: Director; composer; playwright
- Spouses: Chris Perret (divorced); Mark Rylance (m. 1989)
- Children: 2, including Juliet Rylance

Claire Louise van Kampen, Lady Rylance (3 November 1953 – 18 January 2025) was an English director, composer, and playwright. She was the founding director of music at Shakespeare's Globe Theatre from 1997 to 2015, first as assistant to her husband, actor and director Mark Rylance, then with his successor, Dominic Dromgoole, often creating "period" music for Shakespeare's plays.

Van Kampen composed music for productions in both London's West End theatres and on New York City's Broadway which often starred her husband, covering a wide range of repertoire from Helen by Euripides to contemporary plays such as Nice Fish. She also worked as musical director and stage director for some of them. She ventured into composing music for a film, Nights and Days, advising and arranging music for the Wolf Hall television series of the BBC, and composing a ballet for the New York Theatre Ballet. She wrote a play, Farinelli and the King, which was successfully performed both in London and on Broadway.

== Early life and education ==
Van Kampen was born in Marylebone, London on 3 November 1953, the only child of the businessman Paul van Kampen and his wife Ruth (née Relph), and grew up in Muswell Hill.

As her father died when she was age 12, her mother worked as a secretary to afford piano lessons for Claire, who started teaching others from age 14. As a girl, she met David Munrow, a recorder player and pioneer of the early music scene in England as a co-founder of the Early Music Consort, and became interested in Renaissance music. She trained as a pianist at the Royal College of Music for five years, receiving a John Land scholarship. She studied music theory with Ruth Gipps and piano with Peter Element, and she specialised in the performance of 20th-century music, playing several world premieres. She graduated as both concert pianist and composer.

== Career ==
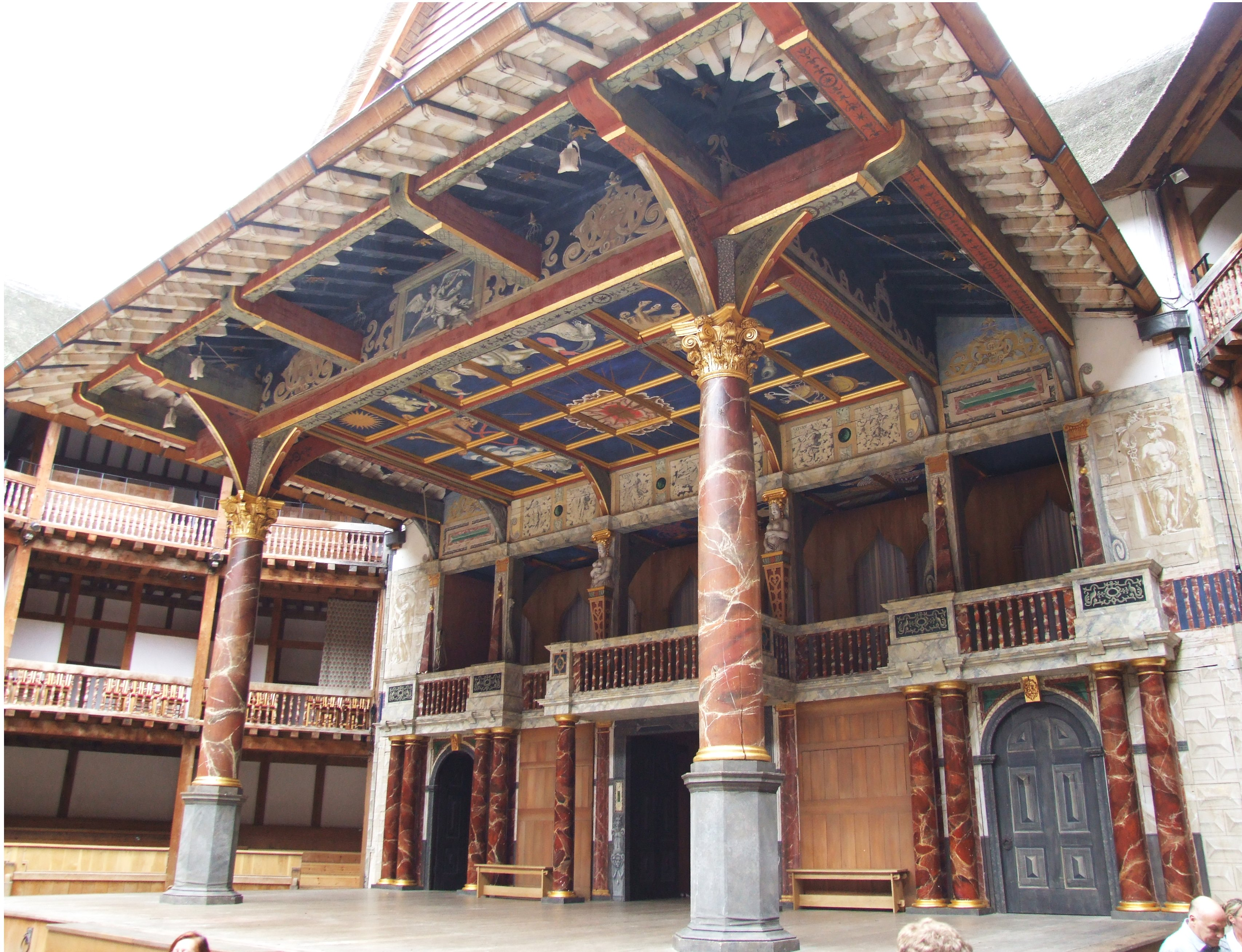
The stage at Shakespeare's Globe. Musicians generally perform from the raised music gallery at the back of the stage.

She joined the Royal Shakespeare Company (RSC) in 1986 and the Royal National Theatre in 1987, making her the first female musical director to work with both companies. At the National, she met her future husband, Mark Rylance, and she composed the music for his 1989 performance as Hamlet at the RSC. She co-founded the theatre company Phoebus Cart with Rylance in 1990.

At the opening of the Shakespeare's Globe Theatre in 1997, van Kampen was appointed the Director of Theatre Music, where she created both period and contemporary music for 48 of the Globe's productions – including the 'jazz' Macbeth in 2001, and Peter Oswald's The Golden Ass in 2002, which contained a 30-minute opera Cupid and Psyche. She worked at the Globe during Rylance's term as the theatre's first artistic director and remained there as musical consultant and resident composer under his successor, Dominic Dromgoole from 2007 to 2015.

In 2007, she received the Vero Nihil Verius Award for Distinguished Achievement in the Arts, conferred upon her by Concordia University in Oregon, United States. Together with Rylance and theatrical designer Jenny Tiramani, she received the 2007 Sam Wanamaker Award for her founding work during the opening ten years at Shakespeare's Globe Theatre. She was awarded an honorary doctorate in music by Brunel University in 2019.

Other composing credits include music for the film Days and Nights and the play Boeing-Boeing. In 2015, she was a historical music advisor and arranger of Tudor music for the BBC's television series Wolf Hall.

She wrote a historical play, Farinelli and the King, about the relationship between the castrato Farinelli and the Spanish King Philip V. It was first performed at Sam Wanamaker Playhouse in February 2015, then at the Duke of York's Theatre in the West End of London from September to December 2015, with Rylance as Philip V. It was also produced on Broadway, directed by John Dove at the Belasco Theatre. It received six Olivier Award nominations, including Best New Play. In 2016 she directed Rylance in Nice Fish at the St. Ann's Warehouse, New York City. The production subsequently transferred to the Harold Pinter Theatre. Her ballet Uncaged, with choreography by Antonia Franceschi, premiered with the New York Theatre Ballet in 2020.

== Personal life and death ==
Van Kampen married an architect, Chris Perret, with whom she had two daughters, Juliet and Nataasha. The marriage ended in divorce.

Van Kampen met Mark Rylance in 1987, and they married at the Rollright Stones in Oxfordshire on 21 December 1989. Her daughter Juliet became an actress and took the surname of her stepfather. Her daughter Nataasha van Kampen became a filmmaker. She died of a suspected brain haemorrhage on a flight from New York in July 2012 at the age of 28.

As of 2015, Van Kampen lived in Brixton. She died of cancer in Kassel, Germany, on 18 January 2025, at the age of 71. It was her husband's 65th birthday.

== Productions ==
Productions for which van Kampen composed music and/or was music director, or stage director, include:

Year	Work	Theatre or company	Role
1991	Hamlet	American Repertory Theater, New York City	Composer and musical director
1991	The Seagull	American Repertory Theater, New York City	Composer and musical director
1994	As You Like It	TFANA, New York City	Composer
2000	True West	Circle in the Square Theatre, New York City	Original score
2000–2001	Macbeth	Shakespeare's Globe, London	Master of music
2001–2002	The Golden Ass	Shakespeare's Globe, London	Master of music
2004–2005	The Tempest	Shakespeare's Globe, London	Composer
2006–2007	Love's Labour's Lost	Shakespeare's Globe, London	Composer
2007	Bash	Theatre of Memory, London	Composer
2007–2008	Boeing-Boeing	Comedy Theatre, London	Original music
2008	Peer Gynt	Guthrie Theater, Minneapolis	Composer
2008	King Lear	Shakespeare's Globe, London	Composer
2008–2009	Boeing-Boeing	Longacre Theatre, New York City	Original music
2009	Helen	Shakespeare's Globe, London, and US Tour	Composer and musical director
2010	Henry IV, Part 1 and Henry IV, Part 2	Shakespeare's Globe, London	Composer and musical director
2012–2013	Twelfth Night	Apollo Theatre, London, and Broadway	Music
2015	Wolf Hall	BBC Television	Music advisor and arranger
2016–2017	Nice Fish	Harold Pinter Theatre, London	Director
2018	Othello	Shakespeare's Globe, London	Director
2020	Uncaged	New York Theatre Ballet	Composer
2024	Pericles, Prince of Tyre	Royal Shakespeare Company	Composer
2024	Juno and the Paycock	Gielgud Theatre	Composer
