= Duo (Peter Ostroushko and Dean Magraw album) =

Studio album by Peter Ostroushko with Dean Magraw
- Released: 1991
- Genre: Americana, folk
- Length: 61:43
- Label: Red House
- Producer: Peter Ostroushko

Peter Ostroushko with Dean Magraw chronology
Blue Mesa (1989)	Duo (1991)	Heart of the Heartland (1995)

Duo is an album by fiddle and mandolin player Peter Ostroushko with guitarist Dean Magraw, released in 1991.

Professional ratings
Review scores
Source	Rating
Allmusic	3/5 stars

== Track listing ==
All songs by Peter Ostroushko unless otherwise noted.

1. "The Whalebone Feathers" – 4:33
2. "Musette in a Minor" – 3:36
3. "Three Brazilian Melodies: Index One/Index Two/Index Three" – 8:21
4. "The Nightingale Medley: Index One/Index Two" – 5:38
5. "Unknowingly She Walked With Grace Amongst Tall Men" – 9:14
6. "The Prairie Suite" – 8:55
7. "Waltz for Hana" – 4:19
8. "Bukavina" – 3:35
9. "When You and I Were Young, Maggie" (James Austin Butterfield, George Washington Johnson) – 5:26
10. "Fiddle Tunes: Mesa de Esoeranza/The Edinburgh Jigs/Sarah Breaky's House, The London Road Jig, Clive Palmer's, The Easter Road)" – 8:44

== Personnel ==
- Peter Ostroushko – mandolin, fiddle, guitar, vocals
- Dean Magraw – guitar

== Production notes ==
- Produced and mixed by Peter Ostroushko
- Bob Feldman – executive producer
- Tom Mudge – engineer, mixing
- Craig Thorson – assistant engineer
- Linda Beauvais – artwork, design
- Dan Corrigan – photography
