= Life Stories (Pat Donohue album) =

Studio album by Pat Donohue
- Released: 1991
- Studio: Steve Tibblts Studio, Minneapolis
- Genre: Jazz, pop
- Length: 49:02
- Label: Bluesky
- Producer: Pat Donohue

Pat Donohue chronology
| Pat Donahue (1987) | Life Stories (1991) | Two Hand Band (1993) |

Life Stories is an album by guitarist Pat Donohue that was released in 1991.

== Track listing ==
All songs by Pat Donohue unless otherwise noted

1. "This Is the Beginning" – 4:36
2. "Goin' Home/Oh Suzanna" (Donohue, Stephen Foster) – 4:01
3. "Hot Head" – 4:30
4. "Pig Iron" – 2:34
5. "High School" – 3:58
6. "The Hard Way" – 3:56
7. "I Don't Know That Guy" (Greg Brown) – 3:53
8. "All My Life" – 3:35
9. "Never Enough" – 3:49
10. "The Sway" – 3:50
11. "My Attorney Bernie" (Dave Frishberg) – 3:05
12. "The Glory of Love" (Billy Hill) – 2:52
13. "La Vie en Rose" (Mack David, Marcel Louiguy, Edith Piaf) – 4:23

== Personnel ==
- Pat Donohue – guitar, vocals
- Peter Ostroushko – mandolin
- Marc Anderson – percussion
- Gordy Johnson – bass

== Production notes ==
- Steve Tibbetts – engineer
- Tom Mudge – engineer
- Phil Mendelson – mastering
- Mary Ellen LaMotte – photography
- Linda Beauvais – design
