= Down the Streets of My Old Neighborhood =

Studio album by Peter Ostroushko
- Released: 1986
- Genre: Americana, folk
- Label: Rounder

Peter Ostroushko chronology
Sluz Duz Music (1985)	Down the Streets of My Old Neighborhood (1986)	Buddies of Swing (1987)

Down the Streets of My Old Neighborhood is an album by fiddle and mandolin player Peter Ostroushko, released in 1986. It is out of print, yet remains highly sought after amongst his fans, and is to this day his most celebrated release.

Professional ratings
Review scores
Source	Rating
Allmusic	4.5/5 stars

== Track listing ==
All songs by Peter Ostroushko unless otherwise noted.

1. "Sluz Blues"
2. "Back Home in N.E. Minneapolis"
3. "Red Dancing Shoes"
4. "B-O-R-S-C-H-T"
5. "Rose of Old Red Wing"
6. "Oh, Glory"
7. "Corny Dog Ramble"
8. "Down the Streets of My Old Neighborhood"
9. "Hey Good Looking"
10. "Ukrainian Medley: In the Meadow Is A Well / Suffering"
11. "The Too-Tight Polka"

== Personnel ==
- Peter Ostroushko – mandolin, fiddle, guitar, vocals
