= Meeting on Southern Soil =

Meeting On Southern Soil

Studio album by Norman Blake and Peter Ostroushko
- Released: February 12, 2002
- Recorded: December 8–10, 2000
- Genre: Americana, folk
- Label: Red House

Peter Ostroushko chronology
Sacred Heart (2000)	Meeting On Southern Soil (2002)	Coming Down from Red Lodge (2003)

Norman Blake chronology
Old Ties (2002)	Meeting on Southern Soil (2002)	The Morning Glory Ramblers (2004)

Meeting on Southern Soil is an album by Norman Blake and Peter Ostroushko, released in 2002.

== Reception ==
Professional ratings
Review scores
Source	Rating
Allmusic	4/5 stars

Writing for Allmusic, the music critic Chris Nickson wrote of the album, "Albums like this renew the roots of American music, bringing new blood (tunes and songs) into what is really a flowing river of history. To hear these two together is a sheer joy and a triumph of musical skill and love."

== Track listing ==
All songs Traditional unless otherwise noted.

1. "Blackberry Blossom" – 3:37
2. "Rise When the Rooster Crows " – 3:14
3. "President Richard Milhous Nixon's Hornpipe" (Ostroushko) – 3:17
4. "Blake's Railroad Blues" (Blake) – 8:45
5. "Muddy Creek" – 2:59
6. "Little Bessie" – 6:03
7. "Chickamauga" (Ostroushko) – 4:03
8. "Only a Bunch of Violets" – 4:33
9. "Oklahoma Redbird" – 2:44
10. "I Cannot Call Her Mother" – 3:46
11. "Marjorie's Waltz #3" (Ostroushko) – 6:52
12. "The Old Hickory Cane" – 3:19
13. "Oh Death" – 4:53
14. "Mandolin Medley: Caperton Ferry/Ruins of Richmond/Valley Head" (Blake) – 4:58
15. "The Little Log Hut in the Lane" – 2:40
16. "Christmas Eve Is Coming, Anna" (Ostroushko) – 3:04

== Personnel ==
- Peter Ostroushko – guitar, mandolin, fiddle, mandola, vocals
- Norman Blake – guitar, mandolin, vocals
- Nancy Blake – cello

== Production notes ==
- Norman Blake – mixing
- Peter Ostroushko – mixing
- Jim Emrich – engineer
- David Glasser – mastering
- Carla Leighton – art direction, design
- Billy Pierce – assistant engineer
- Lane Brown Taylor – photography
