= Postcards (Peter Ostroushko album) =

Studio album by Peter Ostroushko
- Released: June 6, 2006
- Genre: Americana, folk
- Label: Red House
- Producer: Peter Ostroushko

Peter Ostroushko chronology
The Heartland Holiday Concert (2005)	Postcards (2006)	The Mando Boys Live: Holstein Lust (2006)

Postcards is an album by American musician Peter Ostroushko, released in 2006.

The songs on Postcards are culled from songs Ostroushko wrote for A Prairie Home Companion. With few exceptions, each piece is tied specifically to the location the show was visiting for that episode.

== Reception ==
Professional ratings
Review scores
Source	Rating
PopMatters	8/10 stars

Ed Huyck of PopMatters wrote of the album "There is a certain familiarity to the songs, as if the tunes have been part of the American lexicon for decades. Ostroushko has studied hard through his career, and pulls together these different parts of traditional music—the ache of the blues and country, the stomp of traditional folk, the vibe of jazz—into a cohesive whole... Postcards does suffer from some of the usual instrumental album pitfalls. Though the musical styles are varied, the songs still tend to run into each other in the mind. If you want the album to be more than background music (and it really deserves that from the listener), it is best to listen to in small bursts."

== Track listing ==
All songs by Peter Ostroushko.

1. "Manassas Junction" – 3:39
2. "Baghdad Blues" – 3:31
3. "St. Augustine Lullaby" – 3:31
4. "Saturday Night Guys Cruising Van Nuys" – 3:11
5. "When the City of Angels Sleeps" – 3:45
6. "Dayton Cakewalk Delight" – 3:13
7. "Bemidji Blues" – 2:47
8. "Cashdollar's Berkshire Blues" – 3:45
9. "Tecumseh" – 3:46
10. "McCully's Waltz" – 4:54
11. "Montenegro" – 5:57
12. "Meditation on the Thin Space at St. Paul's Chapel"

== Personnel ==
- Peter Ostroushko – mandolin, fiddle, mandocello
- Marc Anderson – percussion, hand percussion
- Dan Chouinard – piano, accordion
- Pat Donohue – guitar, slide guitar
- Ruth Mackenzie – vocals, voices
- Joel Sayles – bass
- Diane Tremaine – cello

== Production notes ==
- Produced and mixed by Peter Ostroushko
- Executive producer – Eric Peltoniemi
- Engineered, mixed and mastered by Matthew Zimmerman
- Photography by Ann Marsden and Dana Miller
- Art direction and design by Carla Leighton
