= Deeper Waters =

Studio album by Robin and Linda Williams
- Released: Feb 24, 2004
- Genre: Americana, folk, country
- Length: 46:02
- Label: Red House
- Producer: Kevin McNoldy

Robin and Linda Williams chronology
Visions of Love (2002)	Deeper Waters (2004)	The First Christmas Gift (2005)

Professional ratings
Review scores
Source	Rating
Allmusic	4.5/5 stars

Deeper Waters is the first album of duo Robin and Linda Williams on the Red House Records label, released in 2004.

Deeper Waters marks the 30th anniversary as a recording and touring unit for Robin and Linda Williams. They wrote or co-wrote all but one track. Guest vocalists include Iris DeMent, Mary Chapin Carpenter, Schuyler Fisk, and actress Sissy Spacek.

Allmusic states "The Williams have issued what amounts to nothing short of a masterpiece and perhaps their most inspired recorded moment. Deeper Waters is a testament to the stories that are seldom told yet lived in every community, era, and household. This is the place where love, grief, loss, endings, and beginnings are given utterance: to whisper, weep, laugh, and reflect as they move through lives both ghostly and grand."

== Track listing ==
All tracks are written by Robin Williams and Linda Williams, unless otherwise noted.

No.	Title	Writer(s)	Harmony vocals	Length
1.	"Whippoorwill"	Robin Williams; Linda Williams; "Dakota" Dave Hull		3:08
2.	"October Light"			3:30
3.	"Clarkfield"	Robin Williams; Linda Williams; Jerome Clark		3:55
4.	"Leaving This Land"	Robin Williams; Linda Williams; Jerome Clark	Iris DeMent	3:40
5.	"Home, No. 235"		Mary Chapin Carpenter	3:48
6.	"Old Plank Road"		Mary Chapin Carpenter, Sissy Spacek & Schuyler Fisk	3:36
7.	"Used to Be"	Robin Williams; Linda Williams; Jerome Clark		3:56
8.	"I'm Just Glad You're Gone"	Robin Williams; Linda Williams; Jimmy Fortune		3:22
9.	"Annie"	Robin Williams; Linda Williams; Jerome Clark		2:55
10.	"I'll Remember You Love in My Prayers/Liza Jane/The Old Stillhouse"	Traditional		6:44
11.	"Saving Me a Place"			3:29
12.	"Lost Little Children"	Robin Williams; Linda Williams; Tim O'Brien		3:59
Total length:				46:02

== Personnel ==
- Linda Williams – vocals, banjo, guitar, background vocals
- Robin Williams – vocals, guitar, background vocals
- Mark Schatz – bass
- Rickie Simpkins – fiddle
- Jim Watson – mandolin, background vocals
- Mike Auldridge – dobro
- Mary Chapin Carpenter – background vocals
- Iris DeMent – background vocals
- Schuyler Fisk – background vocals
- Sissy Spacek – background vocals
- John Jennings – guitar
- Jimmy Gaudreau – mandolin, mandola
- Kevin McNoldy – bass, background vocals

== Production notes ==
- Produced, mixed and mastered by Kevin McNoldy
- Assistant producers - Robin & Linda Williams
- Engineered by Trip Faulconer, Kevin McNoldy and Matt Jagger
- Art direction and design by Carla Leighton
- Photography by Michael "Mick" Wilson
