= Phil Heywood =

- Genres: Country blues
- Occupation(s): Guitarist, songwriter
- Instrument: Guitar
- Website: Official website

Phil Heywood is an American fingerstyle acoustic guitar player, singer and composer.

== Biography ==
Raised in Iowa, Heywood has been based in the Minneapolis area since the mid-1980s.

Heywood has performed as an opening act for Leo Kottke, Norman Blake, Chris Smither and Greg Brown and has performed with Chet Atkins, Tim Sparks, Pat Donohue, and Peter Lang.

He has also performed on such national venues as A Prairie Home Companion and won the National Fingerstyle Guitar Championship at the Walnut Valley Festival in Winfield, Kansas, in 1986.

== Discography ==
- 1990: Some Summer Day
- 1996: Local Joe
- 1997: Ye Olde Wooden Guitar Christmas (compilation with Pat Donohue and Dan Neale)
- 2001: Circle Tour
- 2003: Banks of the River
- 2008: You Got to Move
- 2014: Rollin' On
