= Blue Mesa (album) =

Studio album by Peter Ostroushko
- Released: 1989
- Genre: Americana, folk
- Length: 48:47
- Label: Red House
- Producer: Peter Ostroushko

Peter Ostroushko chronology
Buddies of Swing (1987)	Blue Mesa (1989)	Duo (1991)

Blue Mesa is an album by American fiddle and mandolin player Peter Ostroushko, released in 1989.

Professional ratings
Review scores
Source	Rating
Allmusic	2.5/5 stars

== Track listing ==
1. "International Medley:Lost Indian/Reel of the Hanged Man" (Traditional) – 5:27
2. "Marjorie's Waltz, No. 2" (Ostroushko) – 3:35
3. "Horizontal Hold" (Garrison Keillor, Ostroushko) – 4:13
4. "Irish Medley: Sweeps Hornpipe/The Scholar/Ban Anti AR Lar " (Traditional) – 4:25
5. "The Orthodox Priest" (Ostroushko) – 3:01
6. "Polka Medley: The Charleston Polka/The B.T. Polka" (Ostroushko) – 4:20
7. "Bonnie Mulligan's" (Ostroushko) – 3:54
8. "Monkey on a Dog Cart" (Traditional) – 2:04
9. "Bury Me Beneath the Willow" (Traditional) – 4:51
10. "The Highwire Hornpipe" (Ostroushko) – 3:26
11. "Ukrainian Medley" (Traditional) – 3:48
12. "Blue Mesa" (Ostroushko) – 4:15
13. "Jig Medley: Ostroushko's #1/Ostroushko's #2" (Ostroushko) – 4:04

== Personnel ==
- Peter Ostroushko – mandolin, fiddle, mandola, mandocello, vocals
- Norman Blake – guitar
- Nancy Blake – cello
- Bruce Calin – bass
- Dean Magraw – guitar
- Daíthí Sproule – guitar
- Paddy O'Brien – accordion
- John Anderson – bodhrán
- Sean O'Driscoll – banjo, tenor banjo

== Production notes ==
- Peter Ostroushko – producer, mixing
- Bob Feldman – executive producer
- Tom Mudge – engineer, mixing
- Marge Ostroushko – mixing
- John Scherf – assistant engineer
- Craig Thorson – assistant engineer
- Ann Marsden – photography
- George Ostroushko – artwork, design, illustrations
