= Two Hand Band =

Studio album by Pat Donohue
- Released: 1993
- Studio: Steve Tibbetts Studio, Minneapolis,
- Genre: Folk
- Length: 36:02
- Label: Bluesky

Pat Donohue chronology
Life Stories (1991)	Two Hand Band (1993)	Big Blind Bluesy (1994)

Two Hand Band is an album by guitarist Pat Donohue that was released in 1993.

Guitarist Leo Kottke wrote in the liner notes: ""Enjoy this record, but if you're a guitar player, it's going to haunt you."

== Reception ==
Professional ratings
Review scores
Source	Rating
Allmusic	3/5 stars

Writing for Allmusic, critic Mark Vanderhoff wrote of the album "Two of America's most important musical contributions to the world, folk and jazz, meet head-on with guitar maestro Pat Donohue's Two Hand Band... Donohue's amazing steel string fingerpicking makes it possible for him to perform songs that in most cases were originally written and arranged for large ensembles. His sense of harmony and rhythm is impeccable, but the melodies never get lost in the shuffle."

== Track listing ==
1. "High Society" (Traditional) – 2:46
2. "The Moochie" (Duke Ellington, Irving Mills) – 4:12
3. "Yardbird Suite" (Charlie Parker) – 3:11
4. "All Blues" (Miles Davis) – 4:20
5. "Tico-Tico" (Z. Abru) – 3:14
6. "Seven Come Eleven" (Charlie Christian, Benny Goodman) – 2:58
7. "Royal Garden Blues" (Clarence Williams, Spencer Williams) – 2:04
8. "Summer in Central Park" (Horace Silver) – 4:32
9. "Tea for Two" (Vincent Youmans, Irving Caesar) – 2:09
10. "Georgia on My Mind" (Hoagy Carmichael, Stuart Gorrell) – 3:10
11. "Tequila and Green Onions" (Chuck Rio) – 3:26

== Personnel ==
- Pat Donohue – guitar

== Production notes ==
- Steve Tibbetts – engineer
- Mary Ellen LaMotte – photography
- Johnny Hanson – design
