= Minnesota Youth Symphonies =

American youth musical program

- Origin: Minneapolis–Saint Paul, Minnesota, US
- Genre: Classical
- Occupation: Youth orchestra
- Members: Symphony Conductor; Mark Mandarano; Repertory Conductor; Lucas Shogren; Philharmonic Conductor; Jim Bartsch; String Conductor; Patricia Kelly
- Website: mnyouthsymphonies.org/

Minnesota Youth Symphonies, commonly referred to as MYS, was founded in 1972 by Ralph Winkler. The program has five orchestras composed of students from elementary level through high school, with participation's based on an annual audition. All levels of MYS perform at Orchestra Hall in Minneapolis, as well as other locations, and hosts workshops and classes.

== Orchestras ==
Participation is based on an audition in which the prospective student must perform an appropriate solo, orchestral excerpt, scales and arpeggios, and must sight-read.

The orchestras perform three major concerts in the Twin Cities area, primarily at Orchestra Hall in Minneapolis. There are also other performance opportunities throughout the year. Every fall the orchestras host the Symphony Solo Competition; the winners of the competition perform at the symphony orchestra's spring concert.

In addition to performances, MYS hosts workshops and classes, and an annual summer music program, that usually consists of a chamber string workshop and a composition workshop. The MYS Symphony Orchestra has historically, recently, and will continue to tour internationally. The most recent trip was to Cuba in the summer of 2017

=== String Orchestra ===
The String Orchestra is gauged for the intermediate playing level for only those who play the violin, viola, cello, or bass. The orchestra provides these players with a comprehensive string ensemble experience. The literature for the students is designed to broaden their repertoire and learn more advanced techniques for both playing and following a conductor. The students learn how to successfully navigate difficult passages on their instrument and learn how to listen for orchestral intonation.

=== Wind Orchestra ===
The Wind Orchestra is gauged for the intermediate playing level for only those who play woodwind, brass, or percussion instruments. This orchestra provides these players with a comprehensive wind ensemble experience. The literature for the students is designed to broaden their repertoire and learn more advanced techniques for both playing and following a conductor. The students learn how to successfully navigate difficult passages on their instrument and learn how to listen for orchestral intonation.

=== Philharmonic Orchestra ===
The Philharmonic Orchestra, which is designed to be a full symphony orchestra, is placed at the advanced intermediate playing level. The literature is a combination of arranged and unedited works designed to expose students to a symphony orchestra experience. During rehearsals, there is time set aside for sectionals to iron out specific passages along with exploring different ways to play a passage and nuances to the piece.

Pieces that have been played by the Philharmonic Orchestra include Carmen Suites by Georges Bizet, Dance of the Tumblers from The Snow Maiden by Nikolai Rimsky-Korsakov, a Merle J. Isaac arrangement of Dance Infernale, Berceuse and Finale from The Firebird by Igor Stravinsky and Finlandia by Jean Sibelius.

=== Repertory Orchestra ===
The Repertory Orchestra is also designed to be a full symphony orchestra and is placed at the advanced level. Most, if not all, the literature in this orchestra is unedited. The orchestra helps players refine advanced playing techniques in both sectionals and full-orchestra rehearsals.

The orchestra's repertoire includes the Overture from Candide by Leonard Bernstein, William Tell Overture by Gioachino Rossini, Symphony No. 3 (Organ) by Camille Saint-Saëns, the Overture to Rienzi by Richard Wagner, Symphony No. 9 (From the New World) by Antonín Dvořák, Marche Slave and Symphony No. 4 both by Pyotr Ilyich Tchaikovsky.

=== Symphony orchestra ===
The symphony orchestra is also designed to be a symphony orchestra and plays at a collegiate level. The orchestra is considered the top orchestra in program. The program explores, in depth, the many ways to interpret a phrase and other complex musical aspects. The orchestra also has an annual Symphony Solo Competition; the two winners of this competition perform their selected movement of their piece to perform with the symphony orchestra.

A few highlights of the orchestra's repertoire include Scheherazade by Rimksy-Korsakov, The Rite of Spring by Stravinsky, The Planets by Gustav Holst, Symphony No. 3 by Gustav Mahler.

== Directors ==
MYS was under the artistic direction of Manny Laureano, principal trumpet of the Minnesota Orchestra, and his wife, Claudette Laureano, director of the Breck School's String Program, for thirty-two years. Previous music/artistic directors have included Ralph Winkler, Ed Forner (former assistant conductor with the St. Paul Chamber Orchestra and Professor of Music at Macalester College), Bill McGlaughlin, Clyn D. Barrus and David Tubergen. Under Winkler and Forner's initial leadership, MYS grew from a single orchestra to three ensembles ranging from beginning students to college-level musicians. MYS grew to four orchestras under the leadership of Clyn D. Barrus. Under the leadership of Manny and Claudette Laureano, MYS grew to over 400 students and became known nationally as one of the nation's leading youth symphony organizations, adding a summer program and community outreach programs serving over 600 students.

== Alumni ==
Several alumni of the Minnesota Youth Symphonies program hold positions with professional orchestras, such as the Boston Symphony, Cleveland Orchestra, San Francisco Symphony, Minnesota Orchestra, the Dallas Symphony Orchestra, the Cincinnati Symphony Orchestra and the Saint Paul Chamber Orchestra.

== MYS ==
In 1972, the St. Paul Chamber Orchestra Society ended its sponsorship of the St. Paul Youth Orchestra, and Ralph Winkler established a new youth orchestra, the Minnesota Youth Symphony.

MYS toured Romania in 1973, becoming the first American youth orchestra to tour in a communist country. In 1992, the MYS Symphony Orchestra became the first orchestra to perform in the Super Bowl's half-time show, when Super Bowl XXVI was played at the Hubert H. Humphrey Metrodome in Minneapolis. Elmer Bernstein guest-conducted "The Magnificent Seven" with the MYS Philharmonic Orchestra in 1997. MYS has collaborated with many noted guest artists, conductors and performing groups including Minnesota Orchestra Music Director Osmo Vänskä, Butch Thompson, Charles Lazarus, Jorja Fleezanis, Bel Canto Chorus, St. Paul City Ballet, Minnesota Boys Choir, Ignacio "Nachito" Herrera, Doc Severinsen and the T.C. Swing Dancers. In the winter of 2007, MYS Symphony Orchestra, under the baton of Manny Laureano, performed Stravinsky's Rite of Spring in concert at Orchestra Hall, which was a first for MYS.

The 2007/08 season marked the 35th anniversary of MYS as well as the 20th anniversary of co-artistic directors Claudette and Manny Laureano. In honor of these events, each of the Minnesota Youth Symphonies' four orchestras premiered original works by Minnesotan composers. Full orchestral pieces were commissioned from composers Stephen Paulus, Shelley Hanson and MYS alumnus Edward (Teddy) Niedermaier. To select the fourth work, MYS held a composition competition open to MYS students and alumni under the age of 21. Aaron Hirsch, of Sleepy Eye, Minnesota won this contest with his composition for string orchestra.

In 2015, MYS was invited to take part in the opening concerts at the newly renovated Ordway Center for the Performing Arts. During the two-year renovation of Orchestra Hall, MYS performed in various venues around the Twin Cities, such as churches and concert halls.

In 2017, the MYS Symphony Orchestra toured Cuba, on the heels of the Minnesota Orchestra's historic tour.
