= Profile (Pat Donohue album) =

Studio album by Pat Donohue
- Released: 2005
- Genre: Folk
- Length: 44:13
- Label: Bluesky
- Producer: Pat Donohue

Pat Donohue chronology
Two of a Kind: Groovemasters, Vol. 8 (2001)	Profile (2005)	Freewayman (2008)

Profile is an album by American guitarist Pat Donohue that was released in 2005. Most of the songs are written in a ragtime style. In addition to his own compositions, Donohue also plays traditional blues songs, such as "Risin' River" and "Step it Up and Go".

== Reception ==
In a review for Sing Out! magazine, Mike Regenstreif praises Donohue's witty compositions:

Perhaps the wittiest of all of Donohue's songs is "Jazz Name," a swinging number that cleverly references dozens of legendary jazz musicians with nicknames like Duke, Count, Cleanhead, Fathead, Sweets, Toots and many others in a song that's lots of fun. Another witty number is "Give a Dog a Bone," a Piedmont-style blues song built around double entendres that tell how to keep a mate happy at home. I also enjoyed "Buddy the Blues," which could almost be a companion song to Lead Belly's "Good Morning Blues." In Lead Belly's song, the singer talks directly to the blues, in Donohue's, the blues answer back. The only instrumental is "December Waltz," a pretty tune in 3/4 time that has some of the bluest bent notes you'll hear in a waltz.

== Track listing ==
All songs by Pat Donohue unless otherwise noted

1. "Caroline" – 2:43
2. "Buddy the Blues" – 3:33
3. "Drowning" – 3:11
4. "Jazz Name" – 2:56
5. "Blues for Two" – 3:22
6. "Long Time No See" – 2:13
7. "Risin' River" (Traditional) – 4:20
8. "It Could Be Worse" – 3:22
9. "Do You Love Me?" – 3:31
10. "Give a Dog a Bone" – 3:00
11. "I Blew It" – 2:53
12. "My True Love" – 2:27
13. "December Waltz" – 3:27
14. "Step It Up and Go" (Traditional) – 3:15

== Personnel ==
- Pat Donohue – guitar, vocals
- Radoslav Lorković – piano
- John Niemann – mandolin, violin
- Gary Raynor – bass
- Peter Johnson – drums

== Production notes ==
- Sam Hudson – engineer
- Freddy Newman – photography
