= Two of a Kind: Groovemasters, Vol. 8 =

Studio album by Pat Donohue, Mike Dowling
- Released: May 28, 2002
- Genre: Jazz, folk
- Length: 48:07
- Label: Solid Air
- Producer: Pat Donohue, Mike Dowling

Pat Donohue chronology
American Guitar (2000)	Two of a Kind: Groovemasters, Vol. 8 (2002)	Profile (2005)

Two of a Kind: Groovemasters, Vol. 8 is an album by American guitarists Pat Donohue and Mike Dowling that was released in 2002.

The Groovemasters series is a line of releases by Solid Air pairing various guitarists. Past releases have included Preston Reed, Laurence Juber, Phil Keaggy and Davey Johnstone.

== Reception ==
Professional ratings
Review scores
Source	Rating
Minor 7th	(favorable)

Writing for Minor 7th, critic Fred Kraus wrote of the album "Guitarists Pat Donohue and Mike Dowling infuse their musical roots with more energy than a young pup after a rabbit. Pure enjoyment radiates from the tips of their well-callused fingers to their tapping toes on "Two of a Kind."... Our two earnest musical guides take us on a tour through ragtime, blues, boogie-woogie, jazz, and some gumbos that defy categorization. It's a smooth ride loaded with musical goodies. "

== Track listing ==
1. "High Society" (Traditional) – 2:46
2. "Drive Time" (Pat Donohue) – 2:51
3. "K.C. Man Blues" (Johnson, Williams) – 3:13
4. "Novocaine" (Donohue) – 2:27
5. "Last Train Whistle" (Mike Dowling) – 5:11
6. "Guitar Blues" (Eddie Lang) – 2:27
7. "My Honey's Lovin' Arms" (Joseph Meyer, Herman Ruby) – 2:55
8. "Creepin'" (Donohue) – 3:19
9. "Wild Rose" (Dowling) – 4:11
10. "Fishin' in the Wind" (Dowling) – 2:25
11. "Two of a Kind" (Donohue) – 2:20
12. "World of Hurt" (Dowling) – 3:43
13. "Blues City" (Donohue) – 3:30
14. "Java Buzz" (Dowling) – 2:47
15. "Siboney" (Ernesto Lecuona, Theodora Morse) – 3:52
16. "Gee Whiz" (Donohue) – 2:56

== Personnel ==
- Pat Donohue – guitar
- Mike Dowling – guitar

== Production notes ==
- Pat Donohue – producer
- Mike Dowling – producer
- James Jensen – executive producer, liner notes
- Sam Hudson – engineer
- John Archer – mastering
- Mary Ellen LaMotte – photography
- Johnny Hanson – design
