= Minnesota: A History of the Land =

Soundtrack album by Peter Ostroushko
- Released: March 8, 2005
- Genres: Americana, folk
- Label: Red House
- Producer: Peter Ostroushko

Peter Ostroushko chronology
Coming Down from Red Lodge (2003)	Minnesota: A History of the Land (2005)	The Heartland Holiday Concert (2005)

Minnesota: A History of the Land is an album by Peter Ostroushko, released in 2005. It is the original score to a four-part public television series aired in 2005.

Ostroushko received a "regional" Emmy award for the soundtrack.

== Track listing ==
All songs by Peter Ostroushko.

1. "Uncommon Ground" – 3:44
2. "Glaciers" – 2:58
3. "The Land to Which We Belong" – 3:14
4. "After the Buffalo Hunt / Metis" – 3:40
5. "St. Anthony Falls" – 3:05
6. "King of the Northern Forest" – 2:31
7. "Lumberjack's Waltz" – 3:03
8. "White Pine Elegy" – 3:15
9. "Hinckley Fire Trilogy" – 3:49
10. "Once in the Prairie Tall Grass" – 3:48
11. "Plowman's Reel" – 3:05
12. "Psalm of the Prairie" – 4:48
13. "Crane's Slow Drag" – 3:40
14. "Mill City Rag" – 2:34
15. "Swede Hollow Lament" – 3:49
16. "The Crooked Man's Jig" – 2:35
17. "Mallard Island Hymn" – 3:26
18. "North of the Prairie Stars" – 4:34
19. "Dancin in the Mississippi Mud" – 3:51
20. "Lord, In Thy Bosom We Will Rest" – 3:12

== Personnel ==
- Peter Ostroushko – mandolin, fiddle
- Joel Sayles – bass
- Diane Tremaine – cello
- Dirk Freymuth – guitar
- Laura MacKenzie – bagpipes, flute, concertina, tin whistle
- Bruce Allard – violin, viola
- Marc Anderson – percussion
- Richard Dworsky – piano

== Production notes ==
- Peter Ostroushko – producer, arranger, liner notes, mixing
- Sam Hudson – engineer, mixing
- Richard Hamilton Smith – photography, cover photo
- Ann Marsden – photography
