= American Guitar =

Studio album by Pat Donohue
- Released: 2000
- Length: 40:53
- Label: Bluesky

Pat Donohue chronology
Ye Old Wooden Guitar Christmas (1997)	American Guitar (2000)	Two of a Kind: Groovemasters, Vol. 8 (2002)

American Guitar is an album by American guitarist Pat Donohue that was released in 2000.

== Reception ==
Professional ratings
Review scores
Source	Rating
Allmusic	4/5 stars

Writing for Allmusic, critic Mark Vanderhoff wrote of the album "... a collection of his own compositions and American standards, played in his signature rootsy, jaw-dropping style. While Donohue's own pieces showcase his mastery of fingerpicked acoustic guitar... From start to finish, American Guitar offers top-notch performances that are impressive without being cerebral or sterile. Indeed, a sense of playfulness and fun are present throughout. What really sets Donohue apart from the pack is that he somehow conveys that he's enjoying himself as much as the listener."

== Track listing ==
All songs by Pat Donohue unless otherwise noted.

1. "Novocaine" – 2:08
2. "Welcome Home" – 3:03
3. "Mudslide" – 3:04
4. "Arkansas Traveler" (Traditional) – 2:45
5. "Blue Tango" (Leroy Anderson, Mitchell Parish) – 3:28
6. "Maple Leaf Rag" (Scott Joplin) – 3:06
7. "Fall Creek" – 1:57
8. "Freight Train" (Elizabeth Cotten) – 1:49
9. "Into the Garden" – 2:40
10. "Rush Hour" – 2:18
11. "All Thumbs" – 2:29
12. "Hard Times (Come Again No More)" (Stephen Foster) – 2:13
13. "Joe Fingers" – 2:52
14. "Millwood" – 2:08
15. "Tears" (Frank Capano) – 2:42
16. "The Star-Spangled Banner" (Francis Scott Key, John Stafford Smith) – 1:42

== Personnel ==
- Pat Donohue – guitar

== Production notes ==
- Sam Hudson – engineer
- Brian Forrester – mastering, engineer
- Mary Ellen LaMotte – photography
- Dean Olson – design
