= Michelle C. Williams =

Scottish physician and professor

Michelle Williams
- Born: Michelle Claire Williams
- Education: University of Edinburgh; Open University
- Scientific career
- Fields: Radiology; Cardiac imaging Cardiovascular imaging Thoracic imaging Machine learning
- Workplaces: University of Edinburgh
- Thesis: Computed tomography imaging of the heart (2016)
- Website: www.research.ed.ac.uk/en/persons/michelle-williams

Michelle Claire Williams is a Scottish physician and professor at the University of Edinburgh. She is president elect of the British Society of Cardiovascular Imaging. Her research makes use of medical imaging (computed tomograghy, magnetic resonance imaging and positron emission tomography) and machine learning to understand cardiovascular disease.

== Early life and education ==
Williams studied medicine at the University of Edinburgh. She completed an intercalated year in pathology. Alongside her medical practise she has completed a bachelor's degree at the Open University in mathematics and history. After graduating she worked as a doctor in NHS Lothian, and in 2010 joined a software development company. She was awarded her PhD in 2016 for research on computed tomography imaging of the heart.

== Research and career ==
Williams uses multi-modal non invasive imaging to understand the heart and blood vessels. She combines advanced medical imaging with machine learning and complex analysis. Her research has generated clinical impact, changing national and international guidelines.

In 2021 Williams became the imaging data thematic lead of the British Heart Foundation. Williams is part of the SCOT-HEART clinical trials, which use computed tomography coronary angiography to understand coronary artery disease.

== Select publications ==
- 8F-fluoride positron emission tomography for identification of ruptured and high-risk coronary atherosclerotic plaques: a prospective clinical trial
- Coronary CT Angiography and 5-Year Risk of Myocardial Infarction
- CT coronary angiography in patients with suspected angina due to coronary heart disease (SCOT-HEART): an open-label, parallel-group, multicentre trial
