= Michelle Williams =

Michelle Williams may refer to:

- Michelle Ann Williams (born circa 1965), American public health scholar
- Michelle Williams (singer) (born 1979), American singer, previously a member of Destiny's Child
- Michelle Williams (actress) (born 1980), American actress
- Michelle Toro (born 1991), Canadian swimmer; née Michelle Williams
- Michelle C. Williams, Scottish physician
- Michelle Williams (politician), Texas politician
- Michelle Williams (sprinter), winner of the 1991 NCAA 4 × 100 m championship
