= Robin and Linda Williams =

American folk music duo

- Genres: Country; folk
- Years active: 1971–present
- Labels: Flashlight; Red House; Sugar Hill
- Formerly of: The Hopeful Gospel Quartet
- Website: www.robinandlinda.com

Robin and Linda Williams are a husband-and-wife singer-songwriter folk music duo from Virginia. They met in South Carolina in 1971, and began performing in 1973.

The Williamses started appearing on Garrison Keillor's A Prairie Home Companion radio show in 1975. The duo were members of the Hopeful Gospel Quartet with Keillor and Kate MacKenzie. After touring with Mary Chapin Carpenter in 1993, the pair later sang on her Grammy Award-winning album Stones in the Road. Sugar for Sugar spent 11 weeks in the top 20 of the Americana Chart in the Gavin Report in 1996. In 2004, they switched labels, recording Deeper Waters as their first release on Red House Records.

The Williamses appeared in the film A Prairie Home Companion. They appeared on the WoodSongs Old-Time Radio Hour, hosted by Michael Johnathon.

== Discography ==
- Robin & Linda Williams (1975)
- Shenandoah Moon (1977)
- Welcome Table (1978)
- Dixie Highway Sign (1979)
- Harmony (1981)
- Close As We Can Get (1984)
- Nine 'Til Midnight (1985)
- All Broken Hearts Are the Same (1988)
- Rhythm of Love (1990)
- Turn Toward Tomorrow
- Robin & Linda Williams & Their Fine Group Live (1994)
- Good News (1995)
- Sugar for Sugar (1996)
- Devil of a Dream (1998)
- In the Company of Strangers (2000)
- Visions of Love (2002)
- Deeper Waters (2004)
- The First Christmas Gift (2005)
- Radio Songs (2007)
- Buena Vista (2008)
- Stonewall Country (2011)
- These Old Dark Hills (2012)
- Back 40 (2013)
