= The Writer's Almanac =

Literary podcast

Presentation
- Hosted by: Garrison Keillor
- Genre: society and culture podcast
- Updates: Daily

Production
- No. of episodes: 119

Publication
- Original release: 1993
- Ratings: 4.8/5

Related
- Website: https://www.spreaker.com/show/garrison-keillors-podcast

The Writer's Almanac is a daily podcast and newsletter of poetry and historical interest pieces, usually of literary significance. Begun as a radio program in 1993, it is hosted by Garrison Keillor and was produced and distributed by American Public Media through November 2017. It is also available as a podcast. Past program sponsors include The Poetry Foundation (using funds from a large bequest from philanthropist Ruth Lilly), publisher of Poetry Magazine and The Mosaic Foundation of Rita and Peter Heydon.

Each program is at least five minutes long and begins with the phrase "And here is the Writer's Almanac for [insert date here]". Each program includes vignettes about authors and other noteworthy people whose birthdays or significant events coincide with the program's date, as well as excerpts of important events in history. The program continues with one or more poems chosen by Keillor, and ends with Keillor's traditional sign-off, "Be well, do good work, and keep in touch." The program's theme music is a version of the Swedish song "Ge mig en dag", performed by Richard Dworsky on the piano. The original theme music was from Antonín Dvořák's Slavonic Dance, Op. 72, No. 8.

Written by Betsy Allister, Joy Biles, Priscilla Kinter, Robert McGinley Myers, Heather McPherson, and Holly Vanderhaar, the program was engineered and edited by Thomas Scheuzger, Noah Smith, and Sam Hudson. Production assistance was by Kathy Roach and Katrina Cicala.

In 2005 the program was briefly canceled by Kentucky public radio station WUKY due to concerns about purportedly indecent content in some of the poems. The station reinstated the program after receiving an "outpouring of support" for it. The program was distributed in APM's Classical 24 stream and many stations that carry it air all or mostly Classical music during other times.

In November 2017, after allegations of inappropriate behavior by Keillor toward someone who worked for him on a freelance basis, Minnesota Public Radio terminated its contracts with him and his private media companies. This effectively ended the distribution and broadcast of The Writer's Almanac on public radio, as well as rebroadcasts of Keillor's A Prairie Home Companion.

In the spring 2018, Keillor restarted The Writer's Almanac on his website. In summer 2018, he added the option of subscribing to the newsletter version.

In April 2018, Minnesota Public Radio posted a message stating its intent to re-establish the online archives of The Writer's Almanac and A Prairie Home Companion:

Minnesota Public Radio has reached an agreement with Garrison Keillor to restore free public access to the online archives of A Prairie Home Companion and The Writer's Almanac. They say that past performances of these popular shows will be returned to their respective websites: Prairiehome.org and Writersalmanac.org]. MPR paid Keillor $275,000 as a final settlement. "These archives feature the work of thousands of talented artists, poets, and musicians," said Jon McTaggart, president and CEO of Minnesota Public Radio and American Public Media Group. "We are pleased that these performances will once again be available to fans of these programs."

.
