= Pat Donohue =

American fingerstyle guitarist

- Born: April 28, 1953 (age 72); St. Paul, Minnesota, U.S.
- Genres: Folk, country
- Occupations: Musician, songwriter
- Instrument: Guitar
- Years active: 1973–present
- Labels: Red House, Blue Sky
- Website: patdonohue.com

Patrick Donohue (born April 28, 1953) is an American fingerstyle guitarist born in St. Paul, Minnesota. He is a Grammy winning, National Fingerpicking Guitar Champion songwriter. Donohue has several albums to his credit and his songs have been recorded by Chet Atkins, Suzy Bogguss, and Kenny Rogers. He has performed on A Prairie Home Companion for many years.

== Biography ==
Donohue grew up in St. Paul but moved to Denver, Colorado in 1971 to study at Regis College (now Regis University). After two years at Regis, he transferred to Marquette University in Milwaukee, Wisconsin. After his graduation in 1975, he returned to Denver.

Donohue was influenced early in his career by blues guitarists Robert Johnson, Mississippi John Hurt, and Blind Blake. He listened to folk singers Bob Dylan, Steve Goodman, and John Prine.

In 1985 Donohue's first album, Manhattan to Memphis, was released by Red House. After another album for Red House, he started his label Bluesky Records.

In the early 1990s, Donohue became a member of the house band on the radio program A Prairie Home Companion. He and his colleagues in the Guy's All-Star Shoe Band are on-screen throughout much of the film A Prairie Home Companion based on the radio show. Donohue wrote or co-wrote several of the songs on the soundtrack.

Some of the recordings feature his singer/songwriter side; he has also released instrumental albums.

== Awards and honors ==
In 1982 he was runner-up in the National Fingerpicking Championship at the Walnut Valley Festival in Winfield, Kansas. During the following year he won the championship.

In 2008 the Martin Guitar Company released a signature model, the OM-30DB Pat Donohue Custom Edition.

Donohue's songs have been covered by Kenny Rogers, Suzy Bogguss, and Chet Atkins.

Guitarist Chet Atkins said, "Pat Donohue is one of the greatest fingerpickers in the world today." Donohue wrote a song in praise of Atkins' skill and virtuosity called "Stealin' from Chet". He has recorded a studio version on his Backroads album and a live version on Radio Blues, a collection of his favorite performances from A Prairie Home Companion. Atkins joined him on each version. In the liner notes to the live version, Donohue wrote, "What can I say? The most exciting three minutes of my life. We miss you Chet." (Atkins died a short time before the album was released).

== Discography ==
- Manhattan to Memphis (Red House, 1985)
- Pat Donohue (Red House, 1987)
- Life Stories (BlueSky, 1991)
- Two Hand Band (Bluesky, 1993)
- Big Blind Bluesy (Bluesky, 1994)
- Back Roads (Bluesky, 1996)
- Ye Olde Wooden Guitar Christmas with Phil Heywood and Dan Neale (1997)
- American Guitar (Bluesky, 2000)
- Two of a Kind: Groovemasters, Vol. 8 with Mike Dowling (Solid Air, 2001)
- Radio Blues (A Prairie Home Companion, 2002)
- Profile (Bluesky, 2005)
- Freewayman (Bluesky, 2008)
- Nobody's Fault (Bluesky, 2011)
- Vicksburg Blues with Butch Thompson (Red House, 2012)
- Blue Yonder (Bluesky, 2016)

=== As guest ===
- Greg Brown, Bathtub Blues (Red House, 1993)
- Mary Flower, Cookin' with Flower (Bare, 1982)
- Mary Flower, Rosewood & Steel (Bluesette, 1996)
- Tim O'Brien, Hard Year Blues (Flying Fish, 1984)
- Peter Ostroushko, Postcards (Red House, 2006)
