= Richard Dworsky =

American musician

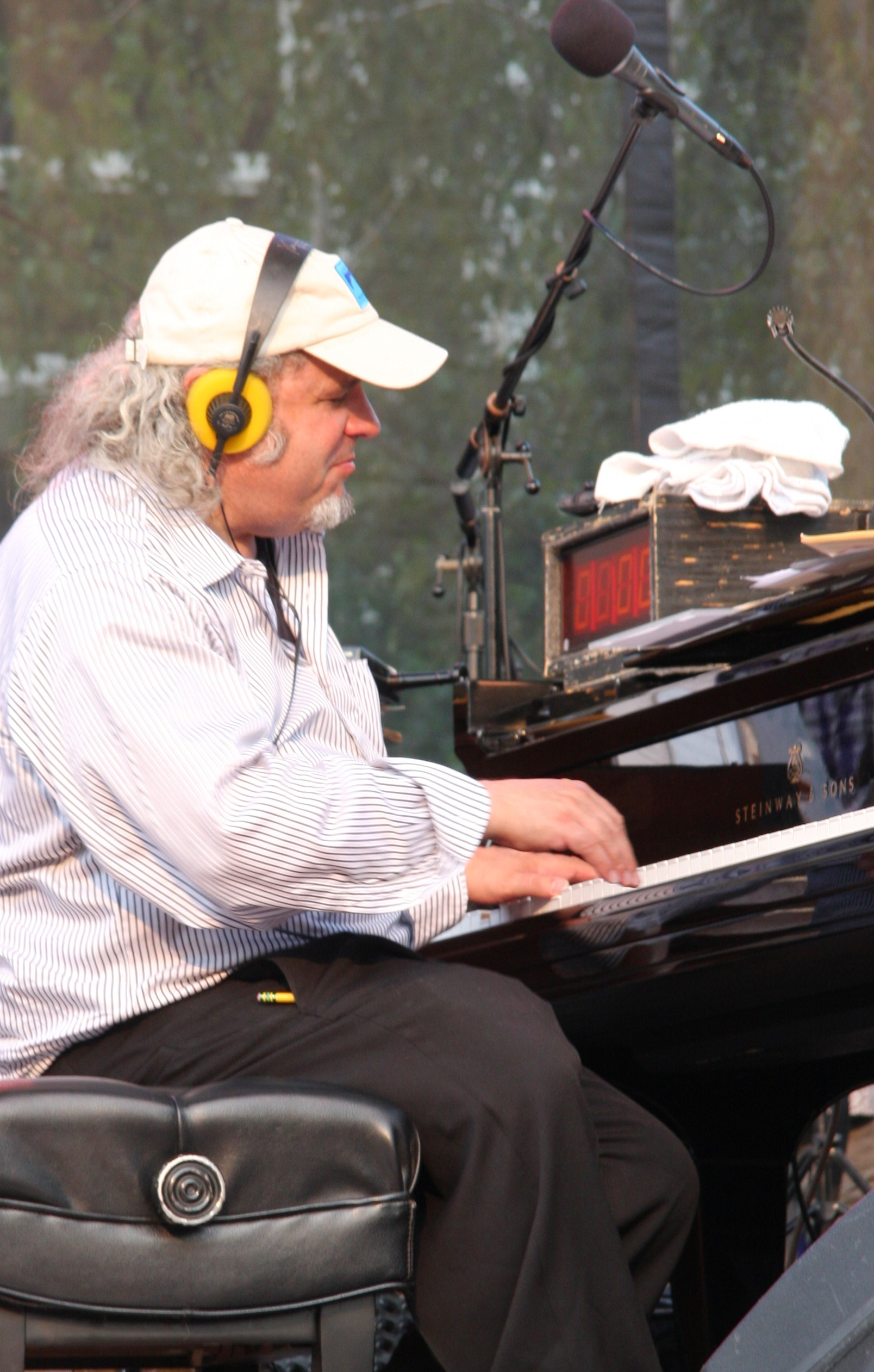
- Dworsky in 2015

Background information
- Born: Saint Paul
- Occupations: keyboardist, composer and music producer
- Instrument: Piano
- Years active: 1970 –present
- Publishers: Windham Hill Records, Gift Horse Recording, Northword, Inner Vista Records, Prairie Home Productions
- Formerly of: The Guy's All-Star Shoe Band
- Website: www.richdworsky.com

Richard Dworsky is a keyboardist, composer and music producer from Minnesota. He has been the bandleader for most of his 20-year tenure at the weekly radio program A Prairie Home Companion for 23 years, produced several albums independently and has collaborated with a variety of notable artists.

== Early life ==
Growing up in Saint Paul, Minnesota, Dworsky was a precocious piano player, taking lessons as early as six years old. Other Dworsky siblings were also interested in music: his sister Sally became a singer-songwriter and his brother Alan a musician and author.

Starting at age 16, Dworsky became part of the Twin Cities live music scene. He soon found a spot in Al Jarreau's band with whom he toured for over two years to places like North Dakota, Alberta and Manitoba, opening for bands such as Steppenwolf and Canned Heat. Dworsky, Jarreau, and bandmate Bobby Schnitzer moved to California in 1971, where Dworsky wrote new material influenced by the likes of Miles Davis and Frank Zappa while pursuing a recording deal that never materialized. Dworsky went back home to Minnesota in 1973.

Back from California, Dworsky enrolled in the music program at the University of Minnesota and worked for seven years as a pianist, conductor and composer at the Children's Theatre Company, where he composed the score for The Marvelous Land of Oz. He also recorded his piece A Morning With the Roses for Windham Hill Records Piano Sampler during that period. The album stayed 12 weeks on the Billboard 200 and 21 weeks on Billboard's Top Jazz Albums chart.

== A Prairie Home Companion ==
Dworsky first appeared as an accompanist on A Prairie Home Companion in 1980. His father, Bob Dworsky, owned the World Theater, where the show was performed, and Minnesota Public Radio rented it for $80 per weekend. Upon Bob’s death in 1978, Richard’s mother, Shirley, became the owner and eventually sold the building of what would become the Fitzgerald Theater to Minnesota Public Radio. The family connection gave Richard an opportunity to play on the show as a pianist and he later became musical director and bandleader of the Guy's All-Star Shoe Band from 1993 to 2016.

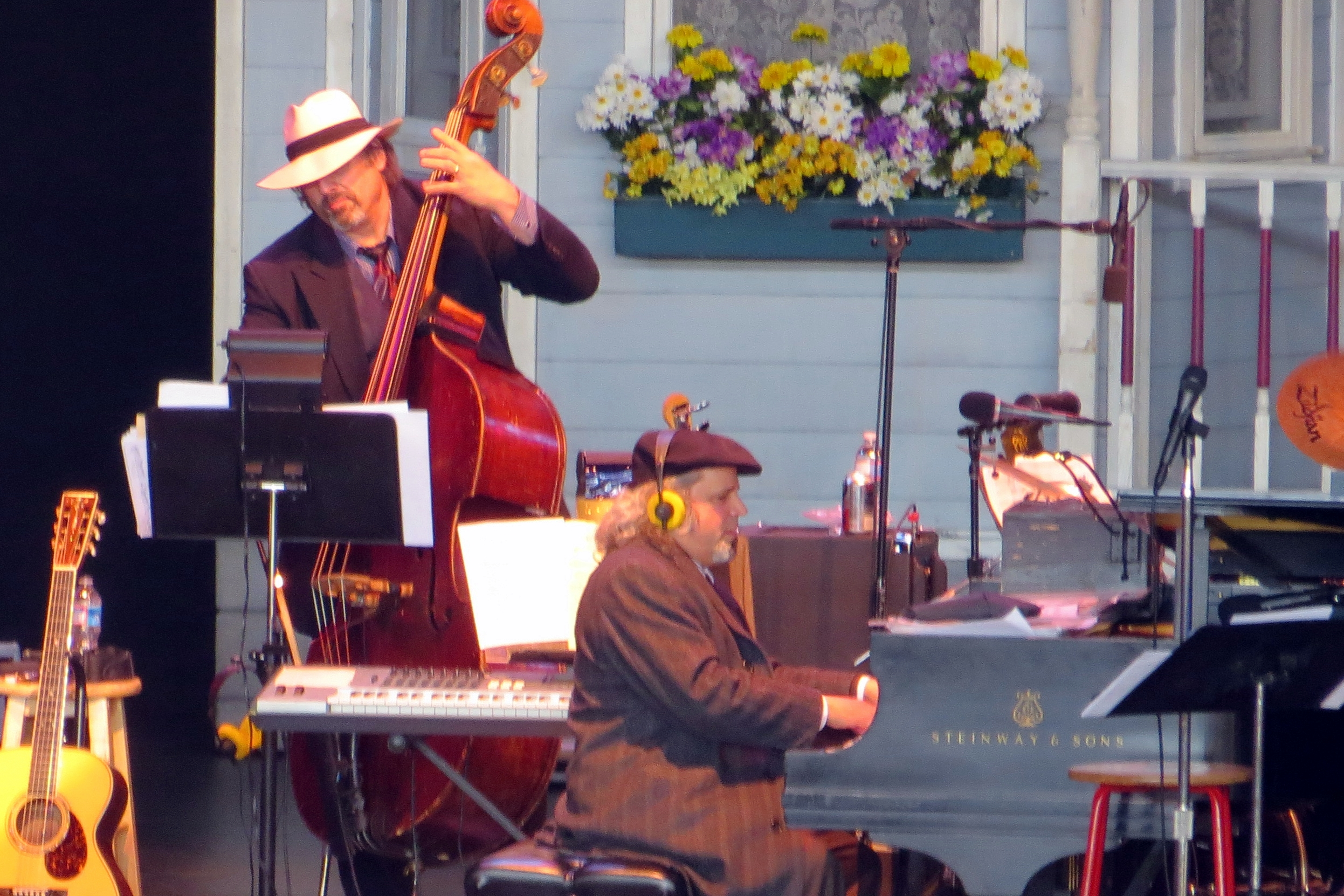
Dworsky with Gary Raynor in a Prairie Home Companion performance in 2015

Show host Garrison Keillor called Dworsky "indispensable", praising the mastery of his craft and improvisations. Comfortable in a wide variety of styles, he accompanied guests such as Paul Simon, Elvis Costello, Renée Fleming, Yo-Yo Ma, Brad Paisley and Emmylou Harris during his tenure on the show. The classically trained Dworsky quickly picked up different styles such as bluegrass and roots rock. This versatility would serve him well throughout his career. The various original pieces he played each week were either composed in advance or improvised. He looked up to David Letterman's bandleader Paul Shaffer; the two men had the opportunity to play together when Shaffer came on the show. He stayed on when Keillor left in 2016 and through the program's rebrand as Live from Here with Chris Thile, but left in 2018. During that period and subsequently, he has continued to collaborate with Keillor on several tours and projects. His album All In Due Time adapts several pieces from the radio show. Guest artists include Jerry Douglas, Stuart Duncan, Jarreau and Sally Dworsky.

Dworsky participated as music arranger and played the piano in Robert Altman's film A Prairie Home Companion, which was released in 2006. The liner notes to the film's soundtrack album include comments from Altman praising Dworsky and the other musicians' "astounding repertoire (most of which they write themselves)".

Dworsky has collaborated with other artists such as Gaby Moreno and Nicole Zuraitis. His song "Goin’ to the Dance With you" was recorded by Kristin Chenoweth on her album "Let yourself go".

He composed and performed the piece Won't you be my ginger that served as the theme for the BBC recordings of Martin Jarvis reading stories from the Just William books by Richmal Crompton.

Dworsky collaborated as a sideman on eight albums by mandolinist/violinist/composer Peter Ostroushko on Red House Records. Albums include Heart of the Heartland and Minnesota: A History of the Land, which was a regional Emmy award winner; soundtrack selections were used as underscore in Ken Burns' PBS documentary "Mark Twain". He provided the piano theme music for the daily poetry podcast The Writer's Almanac. The music is a version of the Swedish song "Ge mig en dag".

== Personal life ==
As of 2016, Dworsky lived in Wayzata. He is a proficient salsa dancer.

== Discography ==
=== Albums ===
- Back to the Garden (1992) - Gift Horse Recording / Blix Street
- The Heart of Spring (1995) - Northword
- The Path to You (2000) - Inner Vista Records
- So Near and Dear to Me (2002) - Prairie Home Productions
- All in Due Time (2025)

=== Included in compilations ===
- A Morning With the Roses (1985) - Windham Hill Records

=== Selected collaborations ===
- All That Lasts with Dominick Farinacci
- It's Our Turn Now with Tony DeSare
- Springtime Prayer with Nola Richardson
- With Peter Odtroushko: eight albums including Heart of the Heartland and Minnesota: A History of the Land
- The Show Closed Out of Town with Nicole Zuraitis
