= Butch Thompson =

American jazz musician (1943–2022)

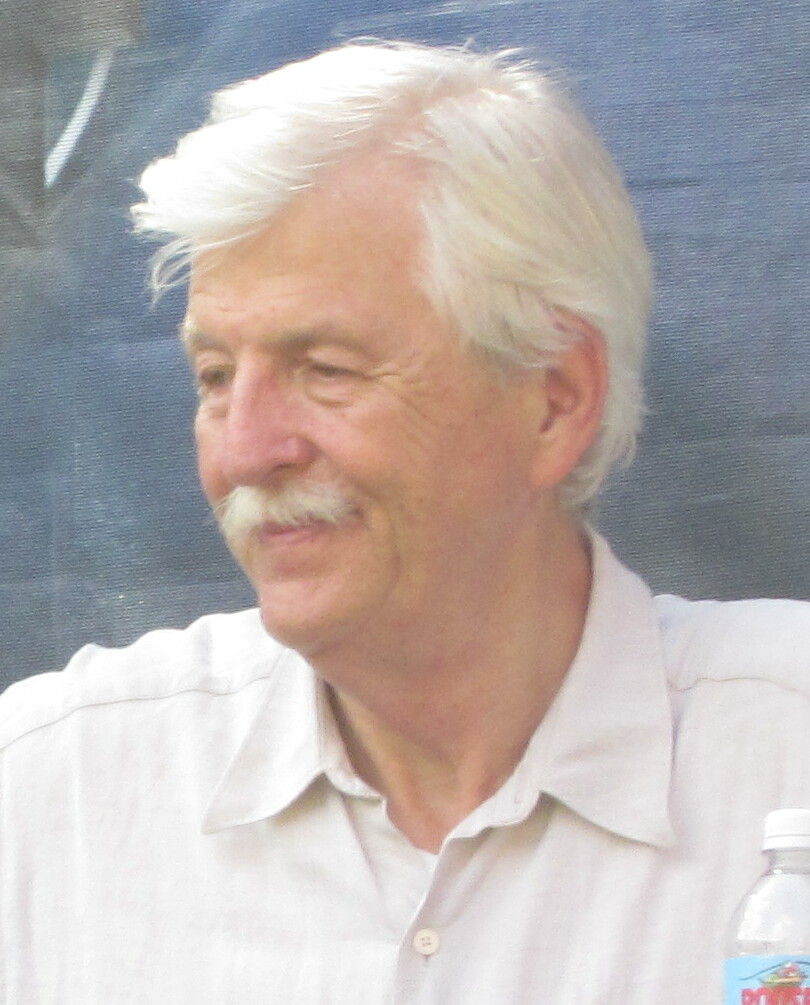
- Thompson in August 2010

Background information
- Born: Richard Enos Thompson; November 28, 1943; Marine on St. Croix, Minnesota, U.S.
- Died: August 14, 2022 (aged 78) Saint Paul, Minnesota, U.S.
- Genres: Jazz, ragtime, stride
- Occupation: Musician
- Instruments: Piano, clarinet
- Years active: 1962–2021
- Website: www.butchthompson.com

Richard Enos "Butch" Thompson (November 28, 1943 – August 14, 2022) was an American jazz pianist and clarinetist, best known for his ragtime and stride performances.

== Music career ==
Thompson was born in Marine on St. Croix, Minnesota, began playing piano at the early age of three, and began taking lessons at age six. At Stillwater Area High School, he played clarinet in the band. In 1962 he joined the Hall Brothers New Orleans Jazz Band in Minneapolis and remained with the band for 20 years. From 1974 to 1986, he was a regular and the original pianist on the radio show A Prairie Home Companion. Since the 1960s, he led the Butch Thompson Trio.

In the 1970s, Thompson's recordings gained popularity in Europe. He toured the continent extensively in the 1970s and 1980s, both as a solo artist and as a band leader or member. He wrote for jazz publications and produced a radio show, Jazz Originals, for KBEM-FM in Minneapolis.

== Selected discography ==
- Little Wonder (Triangle Jazz, 1987)
- Yulestride (Daring Records, 1994)

== Death ==
Thompson died on August 14, 2022, at the age of 78.
