= Dean Magraw =

American musician

- Genres: Jazz, world music
- Occupation: Musician
- Instrument: Guitar
- Labels: Red House, CandyRat
- Website: www.deanmagraw.com/

Dean Magraw is an American guitarist and composer.

== Biography ==
Magraw was born in Minneapolis, Minnesota and grew up in St. Paul. He began playing guitar at the age of 13. Magraw performed in a duo for many years with Peter Ostroushko and has also performed with Tim Sparks, John Gorka and many other artists.

His musical spectrum ranges from world music band Boiled in Lead to jazz band Red Planet.

== Discography ==
=== Solo ===
- Broken Silence (1994) Red House
- Kitchen Man (1997) Acoustic Music
- Seventh One (1998) Red House
- Heavy Meadow (2003) Acoustic Music
- Celtic Hymns (2006) Lifescapes Music
- Music For Healing (2007) Lifescapes
- Foxfire (2008) CandyRat

=== With others ===
- Duo (1991) Red House (with Peter Ostroushko)
- Jaguar at Half Moon (1998)
- Raven (2006) Compass Records (with John Williams)
- Unseen Rain (2007) CandyRat (with Jim Anton and JT Bates)
- Silver (2008) (with Boiled in Lead)
- Next (2008) (with Francois Corneloup)
- Healing (2009) New Folk Records (with Bruce Kurnow)
- Space Dust (2010) GoneJazz Records (with Red Planet)
- How the Light Gets In (2010) Red House (with Marcus Wise)
