= Peter Ostroushko =

American violinist and mandolinist (1953–2021)

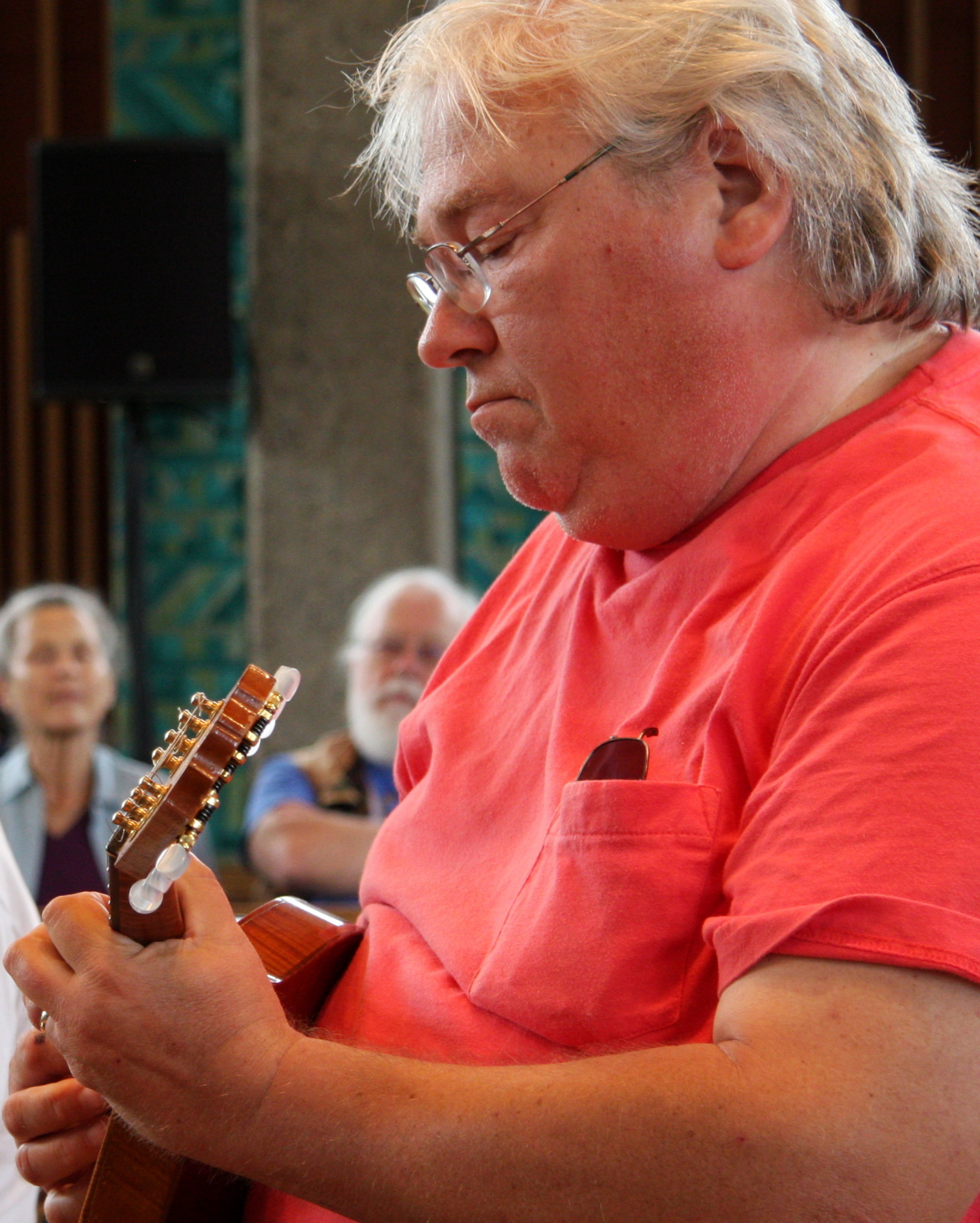
- Peter Ostroushko playing mandolin in 2014

Background information
- Born: August 12, 1953; Minneapolis, Minnesota, U.S.
- Died: February 24, 2021 (aged 67)
- Genres: Americana, folk
- Occupation: Musician
- Instruments: Mandolin, guitar, fiddle
- Labels: Rounder, Red House
- Website: peterostroushko.com

Peter Ostroushko (August 12, 1953 – February 24, 2021) was an American violinist and mandolinist. He performed regularly on the radio program A Prairie Home Companion and with a variety of bands and orchestras in Minneapolis–Saint Paul and nationally. He won a regional Emmy Award for the soundtrack he composed for the documentary series Minnesota: A History of the Land (2005).

== Early life ==
Born 12 August, 1953, and of Ukrainian ancestry, Ostroushko grew up in northeast Minneapolis where he first took up mandolin at age three. His father, William (Wasyl) Ostroushko, was a World War II veteran who had fought in the Soviet Army against Germany, and was wounded and captured during the Battle of Stalingrad. Before emigrating to the United States, he also lived in Vienna, Austria. He was a shoemaker in northeast Minneapolis for many years, and after retirement, played guitar in a Ukrainian polka band called Charivnyky (The Enchanters).

At age 12, Peter started a band with his brother Juryj, three years his senior. Juryj (Americanized as "George") would later become a graphic designer who created many album covers, and was the first in-house designer at Red House Records. He had two other siblings: His sister Ludmilla and brother Taras. Taras, also a musician, played in indie-rock and punk bands, most notably Henry, in the Minneapolis underground-rock scene of the 1980s and 1990s.

== Career ==
Ostroushko released numerous recordings and was a regular performer on the A Prairie Home Companion radio program.

=== Bob Dylan, Willie Nelson, mandolin ===
Ostroushko's first recording session was as an uncredited mandolin player on Bob Dylan's Blood on the Tracks. He had been sick with pneumonia for a week when he was called to join the recording session, but got out of bed and hurried down to play, performing mandolin on "If You See Her, Say Hello." He later said that he had been so sick that he could not be sure that the entire experience hadn't been a hallucination.

He toured with Robin and Linda Williams, Norman Blake, and Chet Atkins. Ostroushko also worked with Emmylou Harris, Willie Nelson, Johnny Gimble, Greg Brown, and John Hartford among many others.

=== Orchestral ===
Ostroushko performed with the Minnesota Orchestra and the Saint Paul Chamber Orchestra. Ostroushko's compositions have been performed by the Saint Paul Chamber Orchestra, the Minnesota Sinfonia, the Rochester Symphony Orchestra, the Des Moines Symphony, and the Kremlin Chamber Orchestra. Music from Heart of the Heartland was used by Ken Burns for the PBS documentary Lewis & Clark: The Journey of the Corps of Discovery, and his arrangement of "Sweet Betsy from Pike" was used in Burns's Mark Twain. He has also composed music for shows by Circus Juventas, a Saint Paul youth circus.

=== Television and radio ===
Ostroushko appeared on television on Austin City Limits, Late Night with David Letterman, and Mister Rogers' Neighborhood, as well as performing regularly on Garrison Keillor's A Prairie Home Companion.

=== Awards ===
Ostroushko received a regional Emmy award for his soundtrack to the 2005 PBS series Minnesota: A History of the Land.

== Personal life ==
Ostroushko was married to public radio producer Marge Ostroushko. They had one daughter together, Anna.

Ostroushko suffered a stroke in January 2018 and stopped performing. A GoFundMe page was set up to assist with medical bills. He died of heart failure on February 24, 2021, at the age of 67.

== Discography ==
Adapted from Apple Music and AllMusic.

- Sluz Duz Music (1985) Rounder
- Down the Streets of My Old Neighborhood (1986) Rounder
- Peter Ostroushko Presents the Mando Boys (1986) Red House
- Buddies of Swing (1987) Red House
- Blue Mesa (1989) Red House
- Duo (1991) Red House (with Dean Magraw)
- Heart of the Heartland (1995) Red House
- Pilgrims on the Heart Road (1997) Red House
- Sacred Heart (2000) Red House
- Meeting on Southern Soil (2002) Red House (with Norman Blake)
- Coming Down from Red Lodge (2003) Red House
- Minnesota: A History of the Land (2005) Red House
- The Heartland Holiday Concert (2005) Red House
- Postcards (2006) Red House
- The Mando Boys Live: Holstein Lust (2006) Borderland
- Peter Joins the Circus (2008)
- When the Last Morning Glory Blooms (2010) (Red House)
- The Mando Chronicles (2012) (Red House)
