= Tim O'Brien discography =

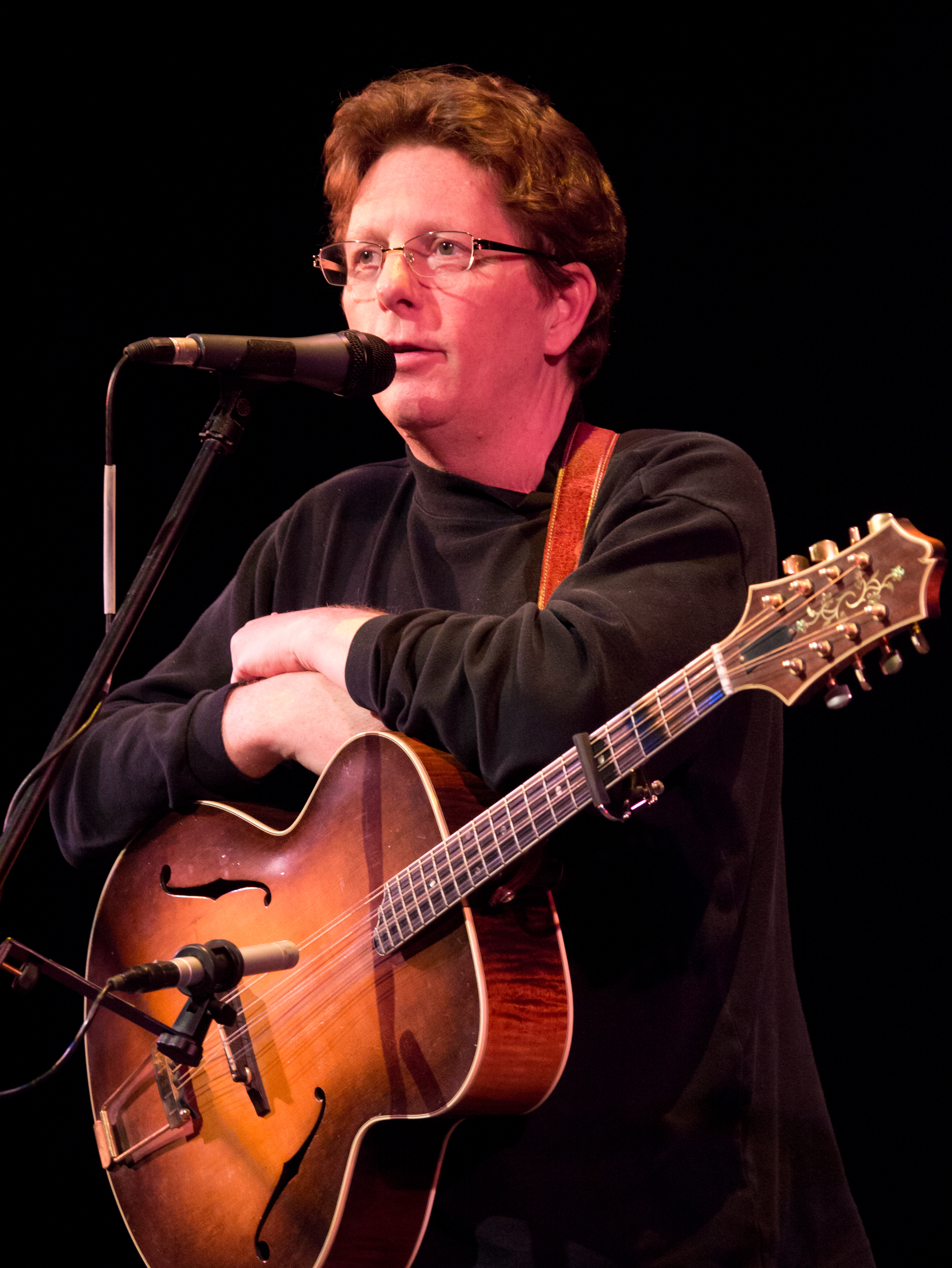
- Tim O'Brien onstage February 17, 2012 in Franklin Park, Round Hill, VA

Tim O'Brien is an American country and bluegrass musician. In addition to his 22 solo albums and his recordings with Hot Rize, he has been featured as a performer on many albums by other artists.

== Albums ==
Year	Album	Peak chart positions				Label
Year	Album	US Grass	US Country	US Heat	US Folk	Label
1977	Guess Who's In Town: Eclectic Fiddle					Biscuit City
1984	Hard Year Blues					Flying Fish
1988	Take Me Back (with Mollie O'Brien)					Sugar Hill
1991	Odd Man In					Sugar Hill
1992	Remember Me (with Mollie O'Brien)					Sugar Hill
1993	Oh Boy! O'Boy! (with The O'Boys)					Sugar Hill
1994	Away Out on the Mountain (with Mollie O'Brien)					Sugar Hill
1995	Rock in My Shoe					Sugar Hill
1996	Red on Blonde					Sugar Hill
1997	When No One's Around					Sugar Hill
1999	The Crossing					Alula Records
2000	Real Time (with Darrell Scott)					Howdy Skies/Sugarhill Records
2001	Two Journeys					Howdy Skies/Sugarhill Records
2003	Traveler	8	74			Sugar Hill
2005	Cornbread Nation	7				Sugar Hill
2005	Fiddler's Green	9				Sugar Hill
2008	Chameleon	6				Howdy Skies
2010	Chicken & Egg	4				Howdy Skies
2012	Live: We're Usually a Lot Better Than This (with Darrell Scott)	3	64	35		Full Light
2013	Memories and Moments (with Darrell Scott)	2	36	9	13	Full Light
2015	Pompadour	10				Howdy Skies
2017	Where The River Meets the Road	4				Howdy Skies
2019	Tim O’Brien Band	1				Howdy Skies
2021	He Walked On					Howdy Skies
2023	Cup of Sugar					Howdy Skies

=== Singles ===
Year	Song	Chart Positions		Album
Year	Song	US Country	CAN Country	Album
1990	"The Battle Hymn of Love" (w/ Kathy Mattea)	9	10	A Collection of Hits (Kathy Mattea album)

== As a member of Hot Rize ==
- 1979: Hot Rize (Flying Fish)
- 1981: Radio Boogie (Flying Fish)
- 1986: Traditional Ties (Sugar Hill)
- 1987: Untold Stories (Sugar Hill)
- 1990: Take It Home (Sugar Hill)
- 2002: So Long Of A Journey (Live At The Boulder Theater) (Sugar Hill)
- 2014: When I'm Free (Ten In Hand)

== As a member of Red Knuckles and the Trailblazers ==
- 1982: Hot Rize Presents Red Knuckles & The Trailblazers (Flying Fish)
- 1984: Honky Tonk Swing Music (Ada Production)
- 1984: In Concert (Flying Fish)
- 1988: Shades of the Past (Sugar Hill)

== As a member of NewGrange ==
- 1999: NewGrange (Compass)
- 2005: A Christmas Heritage (Compass)

== As a member of The Earls of Leicester ==
- 2014: The Earls Of Leicester (Rounder)

== As composer ==
- 1977: Peter Wernick – Dr. Banjo Steps Out (Flying Fish) – track 6, "Gnu Breakdown" (co-written with Peter Wernick)
- 1979: Mark O'Connor – Markology (Rounder) – track 3, "Kit's Waltz"
- 1987: Kathy Mattea – Untasted Honey (Mercury) – track 1, "Untold Stories"; track 5, "Late in the Day"
- 1996: The String Cheese Incident – Born on the Wrong Planet (SCI Fidelity) – track 3, "Land's End"
- 1997: Garth Brooks – Sevens (Capitol) – track 11, "When There's No One Around" (co-written with Darrell Scott)
- 1999: Phish – Hampton Comes Alive (Elektra) – track 5-02, "Nellie Kane"
- 2000: Nickel Creek – Nickel Creek (Sugar Hill) – track 6, "When You Come Back Down" (co-written with Danny O'Keefe)
- 2002: Dixie Chicks – Home (Monument) – track 7, "More Love" (co-written with Gary Nicholson)
- 2003: Hal Ketchum – The King Of Love (Curb) – track 8, "Takin' My Time" (co-written with Hal Ketchum)
- 2006: The Duhks – Migrations (Sugar Hill) – lyrics on track 7, "Moses Don't Get Lost"
- 2009: The String Cheese Incident – Trick or Treat (SCI Fidelity) – track 1-01, "Land's End"
- 2010: Dierks Bentley – Up on the Ridge (Capitol Nashville) – track 8, "You're Dead to Me" (co-written with Dierks Bentley and Jon Randall Stewart)
- 2010: Gráda - Natural Angle (Compass) - track 2, "John Riley" (co-written with Guy Clark)
- 2011: Alison Krauss and Union Station – Paper Airplane (Rounder) – track 7, "On the Outside Looking In"
- 2011: Jeff White – Right Beside You (self-released) – track 10, "Climbin' Up a Mountain"
- 2011: Gibson Brothers – Help My Brother (Compass) – track 7, "Want Vs. Need" (co-written with Eric Gibson and Leigh Gibson)
- 2016: Bryan Sutton – The More I Learn (Sugar Hill) – track 1, "Walkin’ Across the Land" (co-written with Nick Forster)
- 2016: Darrell Scott – Couchville Sessions (Full Light / Thirty Tigers) – track 8, "It's Another Day" (co-written with Darrell Scott)

== As producer ==
- 1990: Mollie O'Brien – Everynight in the Week (Resounding)
- 1994: Open House – Second Story (Green Linnet)
- 2004: Dick Siegel – A Little Pain Never Hurt (Arden)
- 2006: The Duhks – Migrations (Sugar Hill) – co-producer
- 2006: Riley Baugus – Long Steel Rail (Sugar Hill)
- 2010: Gráda - Natural Angle (Compass)
- 2012: Old Man Luedecke – Tender Is The Night (True North)
- 2016: John D. Hutchison – You and the World Outside (Howdy Skies)

== Other appearances ==
=== 1977–1993 ===
- 1977: Peter Wernick – Dr. Banjo Steps Out (Flying Fish)
- 1978: Dakota Dave Hull and Sean Blackburn – North by Southwest (Biscuit City)
- 1985: Carla Sciaky – In Between (Propinquity)
- 1985: Peter Ostroushko with the Slüz Düz Orchestra – Slüz Düz Music: Original American Dance Tunes With an Old World Flavor (Rounder)
- 1986: Laurie Lewis – Restless Rambling Heart (Flying Fish)
- 1990: Dwight Yoakam – If There Was a Way (Reprise)
- 1991: various artists – Sugar Plums (Holiday Treats from Sugar Hill) (Sugar Hill)
- 1992: Jerry Douglas – Slide Rule (Sugar Hill)
- 1993: Psychograss – Psychograss (Windham Hill)
- 1993: Peter Wernick - On A Roll (Sugar Hill)

=== 1994–1999 ===
- 1994: John Gorka – Out of the Valley (High Street Records)
- 1994: Mike Seeger – Third Annual Farewell Reunion (Rounder)
- 1996: Kathy Kallick – Call Me a Taxi (Sugar Hill)
- 1996: Phish – Red Rocks Amphitheater, Morrison, CO (8-7-1996) as special guest
- 1997: Darol Anger – Heritage (Six Degrees)
- 1997: Robert Earl Keen – Picnic (Arista Austin)
- 1997: Ralph Stanley and Friends – Clinch Mountain Country (Rebel)
- 1997: John Whelan – Celtic Crossroads (Narada Lotus)
- 1998: Matt Flinner – The View from Here (Compass)
- 1998: Jerry Douglas - Restless on the Farm (Sugar Hill)
- 1999: Steve Earle and the Del McCoury Band – The Mountain (E-Squared)
- 1999: Béla Fleck – The Bluegrass Sessions: Tales from the Acoustic Planet, Vol. 2 (Warner Bros.)
- 1999: Kate Rusby – Sleepless (Compass)
- 1999: Darrell Scott – Family Tree (Sugar Hill)

=== 2000–2004 ===
- 2000: Alison Brown – Fair Weather (Compass)
- 2000: Steve Earle – Transcendental Blues (E-Squared)
- 2001: Scott Miller and the Commonwealth – Thus Always to Tyrants (Sugar Hill)
- 2001: Kate Rusby – Little Lights (Compass)
- 2001: The Wayfaring Strangers – Shifting Sands of Time (Rounder)
- 2002: The Chieftains – Down the Old Plank Road: The Nashville Sessions (RCA Victor)
- 2002: Guy Clark – The Dark (Sugar Hill)
- 2002: Karen Matheson – Time to Fall (Sanctuary / Vertical)
- 2002: various artists – Christmas On The Mountain: A Bluegrass Christmas (Universal South) – track 7, "Bah Humbug"
- 2003: The Chieftains – Further Down the Old Plank Road (Victor)
- 2003: Steve Earle – Just an American Boy (Artemis Records)
- 2003: various artists – Music from the motion picture 'Cold Mountain' (DMZ / Columbia)
- 2003: various artists – The Legend Lives On: A Tribute to Bill Monroe (Audium) – track 1-08, "Highway of Sorrow"; track 2–10, "Workin' on a Building"
- 2004: Mary Chapin Carpenter – Between Here and Gone (Columbia)
- 2004: Maura O'Connell – Don't I Know (Sugar Hill)
- 2004: various artists – Moody Bluegrass: A Nashville Tribute to The Moody Blues (Rounder)

=== 2005–2009 ===
- 2005: Ciaran Tourish – Down The Line (Compass)
- 2005: Joe Hodgkins – Stories (Country Roads)
- 2005: Wayne Scott – This Weary Way (Full Light)
- 2006: Sam Bush – Laps in Seven (Sugar Hill)
- 2006: Dale Ann Bradley – Catch Tomorrow (Compass)
- 2006: The Duhks – Migrations (Sugar Hill)
- 2006: Chris Smither – Leave the Light On (Signature Sounds)
- 2006: various artists – Sail Away: The Songs Of Randy Newman (Sugar Hill) – track 1, "Sail Away"
- 2007: Karan Casey – Distant Shore (Shanachie)
- 2008: Joan Baez – Day After Tomorrow (Razor & Tie)
- 2008: Eric Brace and Peter Cooper – You Don't Have to Like Them Both (Red Beet)
- 2008: Various Artists – Transatlantic Sessions 3 (Whirlie Records)
- 2009: Steve Earle – Townes (New West)
- 2009: Sarah Jarosz – Song Up In Her Head (Sugar Hill)
- 2000: Chris Jones and the Night Drivers – Cloud of Dust (GSM)
- 2009: Steve Martin – The Crow: New Songs for the 5-String Banjo (Rounder)
- 2009: Sara Watkins – Sara Watkins (Nonesuch)

=== 2010–present ===
- 2010: Kris Drever – Mark the Hard Earth (Navigator)
- 2010: The John Hartford Stringband – Memories of John (Compass)
- 2010: Nora Jane Struthers – Nora Jane Struthers (Blue Pig)
- 2011: various artists – Moody Bluegrass TWO...Much Love (Bunny Rae)
- 2011: David Bromberg – Use Me (Appleseed)
- 2011: Noam Pikelny – Beat the Devil and Carry a Rail (Compass)
- 2011: various artists – This One's for Him: A Tribute to Guy Clark (Icehouse) – track 2-09, "Texas Cookin'" (with Darrell Scott and Gary Nicholson)
- 2012: Dierks Bentley – Home (Capitol Nashville)
- 2012: Mark Knopfler – Privateering (Verve Records)
- 2012: Kathy Mattea – Calling Me Home (Sugar Hill)
- 2012: Stan Ridgway – Mr. Trouble (A440)
- 2013: Frank Solivan and Dirty Kitchen – On the Edge (Compass)
- 2013: Andy Statman – Superstring Theory (Shefa)
- 2013: Various Artists – Transatlantic Sessions 6 (Whirlie Records)
- 2014: Eric Brace and Karl Straub – Hangtown Dancehall (Red Beet)
- 2014: Jack Clement – For Once and For All (I.R.S.)
- 2014: Johnsmith – The Longing Road (self-released)
- 2014: Mister Roper – Mister Roper (Red Parlor)
- 2014: various artists – Link of Chain: A Songwriters' Tribute to Chris Smither (Signature Sounds) – track 9, "Origin of Species"
- 2015: Sam Gleaves – Ain't We Brothers (Community Music)
- 2015: Jayme Stone – Jayme Stone's Lomax Project (Borealis)
- 2015: various artists – The Unbroken Circle: The Musical Heritage of The Carter Family (Dualtone)
- 2016: Paul Burch – Meridian Rising (Plowboy)
- 2016: The Devil Makes Three – Redemption & Ruin (New West)
- 2016: John Prine – For Better, or Worse (Oh Boy)
- 2020: Sturgill Simpson - Cuttin' Grass, Vol. 1: The Butcher Shoppe Sessions
- 2020: Sturgill Simpson - Cuttin' Grass, Vol. 2: The Cowboy Arms Sessions
- 2021: Sierra Ferrell – Long Time Coming (Rounder)
- 2025: Tim O'Brien, Bill Frisell & Dale Bruning – Life Lessons (Wendell World Records)
