= ETown =

Non-profit organisation in the US

eTown
- Genre: Music, interview, storytelling (radio variety)
- Running time: 60 minutes
- Country of origin: United States
- Language: English
- Hosted by: Nick Forster; Helen Forster
- Recording studio: Boulder, CO
- Original release: April 22, 1991
- Website: Official website
- Podcast: itunes.apple.com/us/podcast/etown/id441558505?mt=2

eTown is a broadcast organization based in Boulder, Colorado. eTown is a nationally syndicated multimedia and event production company. The eTown radio broadcasts on National Public Radio, community radio stations, and commercial radio. The program includes a variety show format featuring live musical performances, interviews with musicians, authors, and other public figures.

eTown is recorded in front of a live audience at eTown Hall, a solar-powered theater in Boulder, CO, which also serves as a social hub for community events. eTown also records eTown on the Road which is taped on location in various cities across the country.

== Background ==
eTown was founded in 1991 by host Nick Forster and his wife, Helen Forster, who serves as co-host and executive producer of the show. eTown broadcasts roots music, conversation and environmental and community activism.

In 1990, Nick accompanied Sam Bush, John Cowan, and Laurie Lewis on a US State Department tour of Eastern Europe and Turkey. Forster has said that during the tour he was inspired to create a radio program that would combine music, live-performance audiences and discussion of environmental issues having observed the role music plays in bringing people together and environmental degradation in the region due to a lack of community control. Nick shared the idea of the radio show with Helen, who agreed to help him. The two of them launched the program on Earth Day in 1991.

=== Nick Forster ===
eTown host Nick Forster's involvement in music began as a teenager playing guitar in various amateur folk and folk-rock bands in upstate New York. A job offer as a luthier (guitar repairman) led him to Colorado in 1975, where he met future bandmates Charles Sawtelle, Pete Wernick and Tim O'Brien. In 1978, the men formed the bluegrass group Hot Rize. In Hot Rize, Nick Forster played the bass and guitar, provided vocals and acted as the group's M.C. The band released ten albums. Following the retirement of Hot Rize, he formed a new group with Tim O’Brien and Jerry Douglas.

=== Helen Forster ===
eTown's co-host Helen Forster began her artistic career as a child studying and performing theater and music in Minneapolis. She attended the University of Minnesota, where she developed an interest in environmentalism. After college, Helen moved to Telluride, Colorado, where she joined two theater companies: SRO, an improvisational comedy troupe loosely modeled on Second City Chicago, and Plunge Players, a formal theater company led by L.A. director Paul Fagan. During this period, she also performed in radio theater productions, co-authored three children's musicals and trained as a vocalist. She also worked as a producer and director of stage productions and live radio theater pieces. Helen Forster also owned the Telluride Bluegrass Festival. In the late 1980s, Helen met Nick backstage during the festival. Outside of her current role in eTown, Helen has performed as a vocalist on Prairie Home Companion and in concerts in the US. She also does work in voice-overs.

== Format ==
eTown's broadcasts include musicians who perform for the show's live audience in a variety show format. Two artists typically appear on the show each week. These musical performances are interspersed with informal interviews with show host Nick Forster. eTown broadcasts also include the show's eChievement Award segment, acknowledging individuals for their work towards an environmental or social cause. Some shows also include an additional interview segment, featuring discussions with authors, activists, scientists and policymakers about social and environmental issues and possible solutions.

=== Performers ===
Since its inception in 1991, more than one thousand visiting and local artists have performed on the program.

- Aaron Neville Quintet,
- David Gray,
- James Taylor,
- Michael Franti & Spearhead
- Loretta Lynn, Ray LaMontagne
- The Fray, Ralph Stanley
- The Blind Boys of Alabama
- Bruce Cockburn
- Barenaked Ladies
- Ingrid Michaelson
- Koko Taylor
- David Crosby & Graham Nash
- Ani DiFranco
- Pops Staples
- Randy Newman
- Dr. John
- Joe Jackson
- Sarah McLachlan
- Los Lobos
- The Fairfield Four
- Bruce Hornsby
- Bill Frisell
- Shawn Colvin
- Lyle Lovett
- Buddy Guy
- Jack Johnson
- Odetta
- Ben Harper
- Richard Thompson
- Wanda Jackson
- Rickie Lee Jones
- Keb' Mo'
- Spoon
- Ladysmith Black Mambazo
- Del McCoury
- Taj Mahal
- Emmylou Harris
- Willie Nelson
- Nickel Creek
- Pinetop Perkins
- Béla Fleck
- Earl Scruggs
- Glen Hansard
- Kenny Wayne Shepherd
- The Flatlanders
- Townes Van Zandt
- Patty Griffin
- Charlie Musselwhite
- Doc Watson
- James McMurtry

=== eTones ===
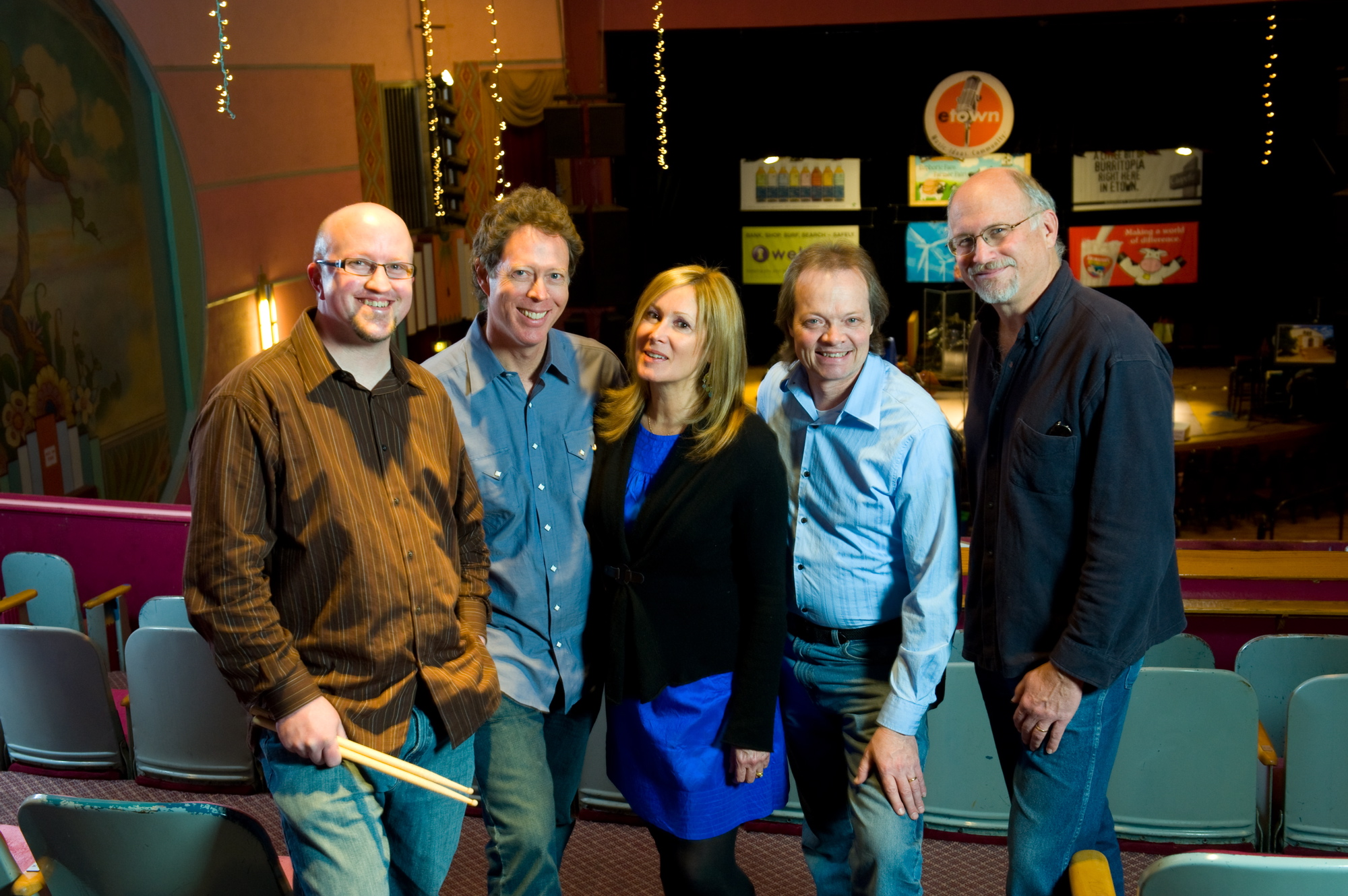
The eTones

The eTown house band, the eTones, perform throughout various segments of the program, and often with the visiting artists featured on the show. The band is composed of Ron Jolly (keyboards), Christian Teele (drums), Chris Engleman (bass), and Helen Forster (harmony vocals) join Nick Forster (guitars/mandolin).

=== Guests ===
Others have been featured in eTown interviews in addition to musical guests.

- Jane Goodall
- Al Gore
- Jack Collom
- Allen Ginsberg
- Dave Barry
- Robert F. Kennedy Jr.
- Jimmy Carter
- Michael Moore
- Terry Tempest Williams
- Bryan Willson
- Baxter Black
- Paul Krugman
- Ed Begley, Jr.
- George McGovern
- Pete Seeger
- Julia Butterfly Hill
- Erik Weihenmayer
- Amy Goodman.

== eTown Hall ==
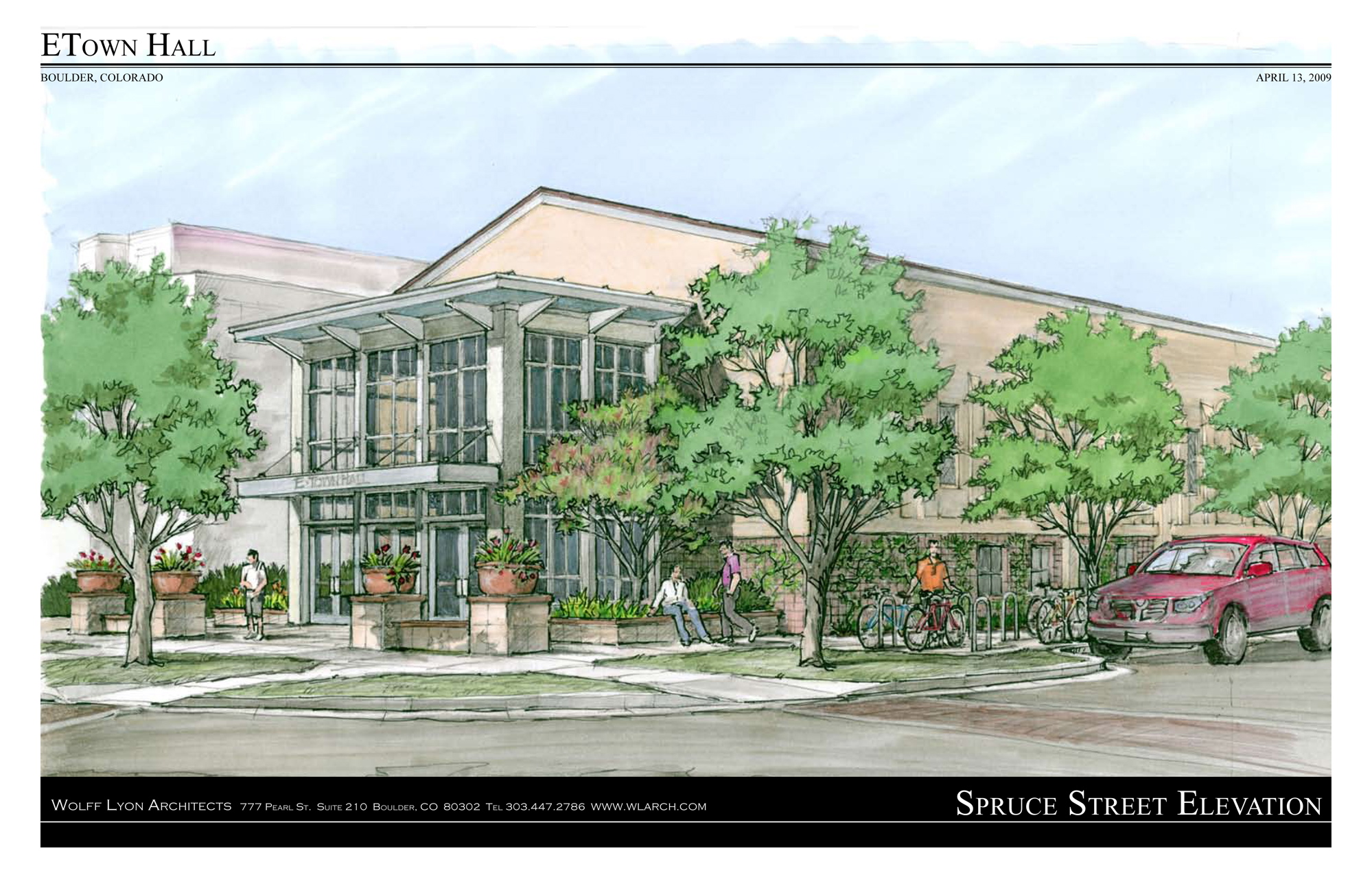
a sketch of eTown Hall

In 2012, eTown moved into the renovated eTown Hall building. Purchased by the organization in 2008, the former church, built in 1925, was converted into a performance hall, recording and production studios, eTown offices, and shared community space. The eTown Hall generates the majority of its power using solar panels on site. eTown Hall is located at 1535 Spruce St. in downtown Boulder, Colorado 80302.

== Gallery ==
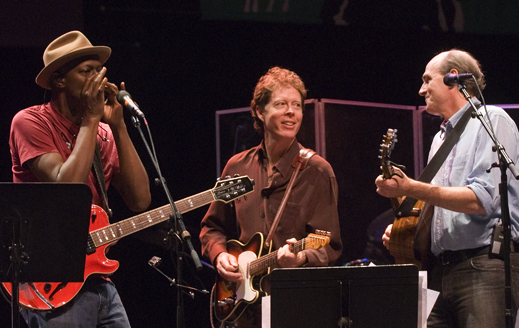
Keb'Mo (left), James Taylor (right) and Nick Forster (center) perform on eTown.

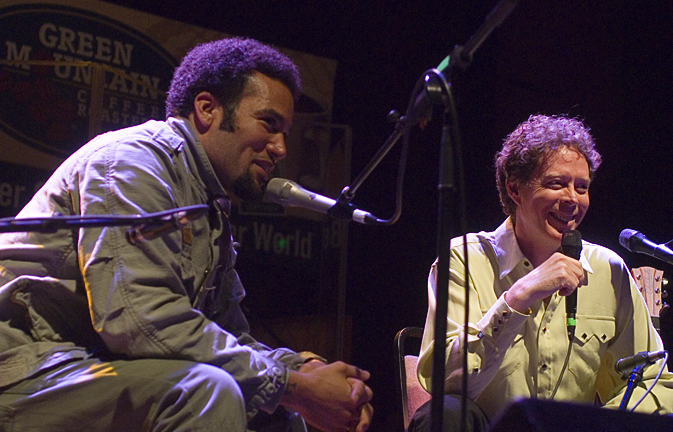
Ben Harper interviews with Nick Forster on eTown.

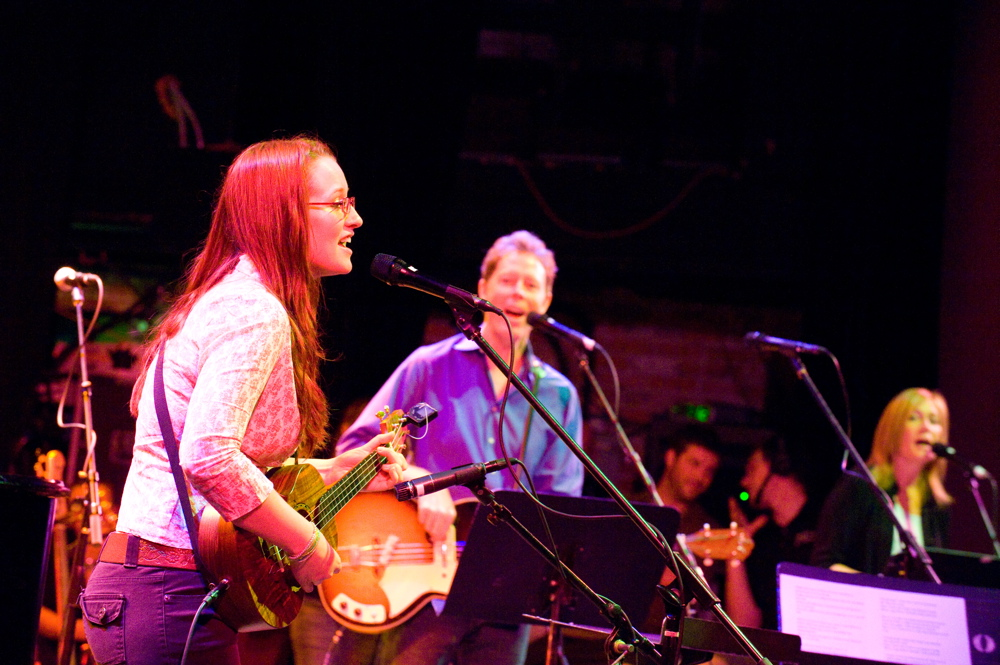
Ingrid Michaelson performs on eTown.

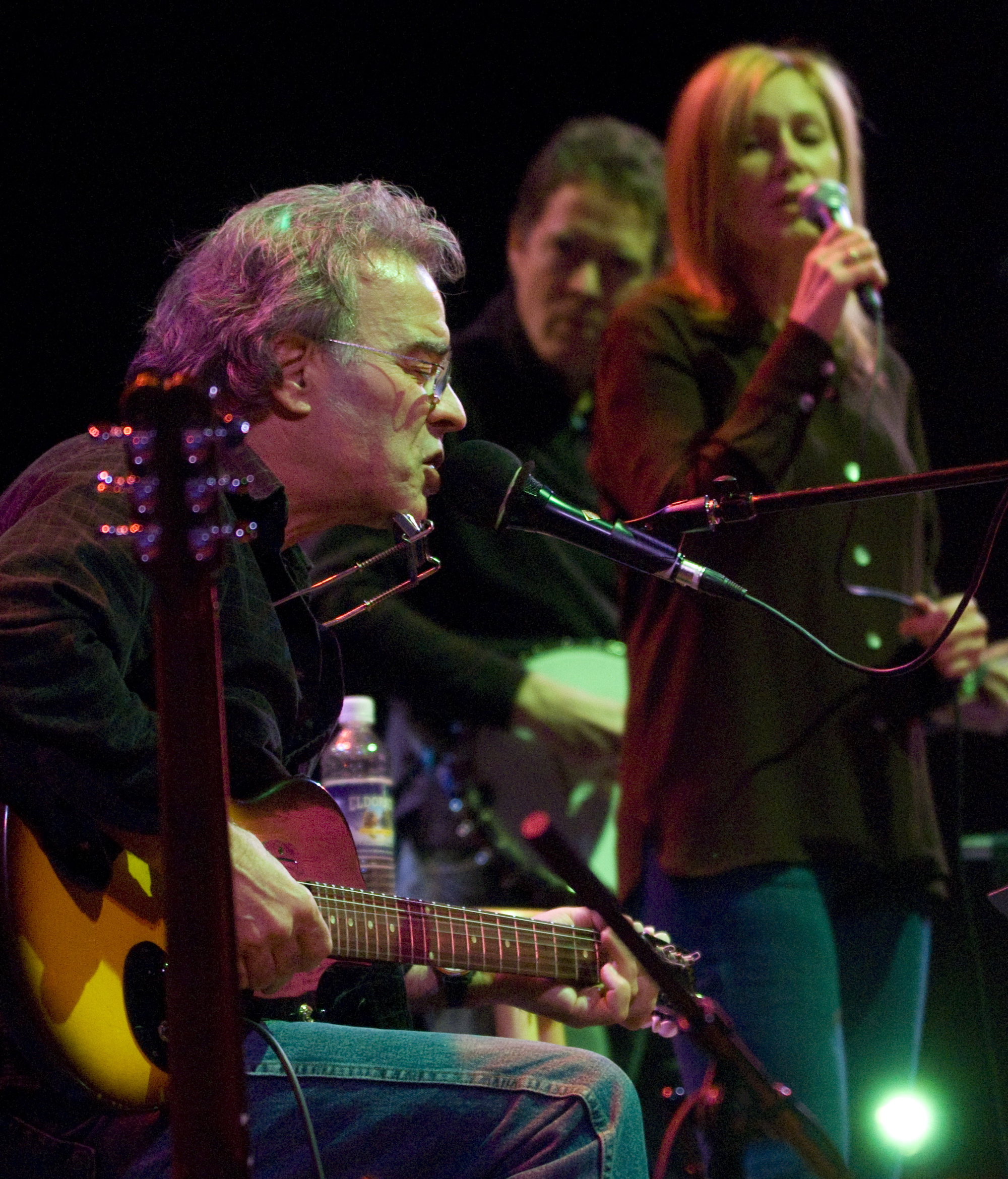
Ray Bonneville performs on eTown.

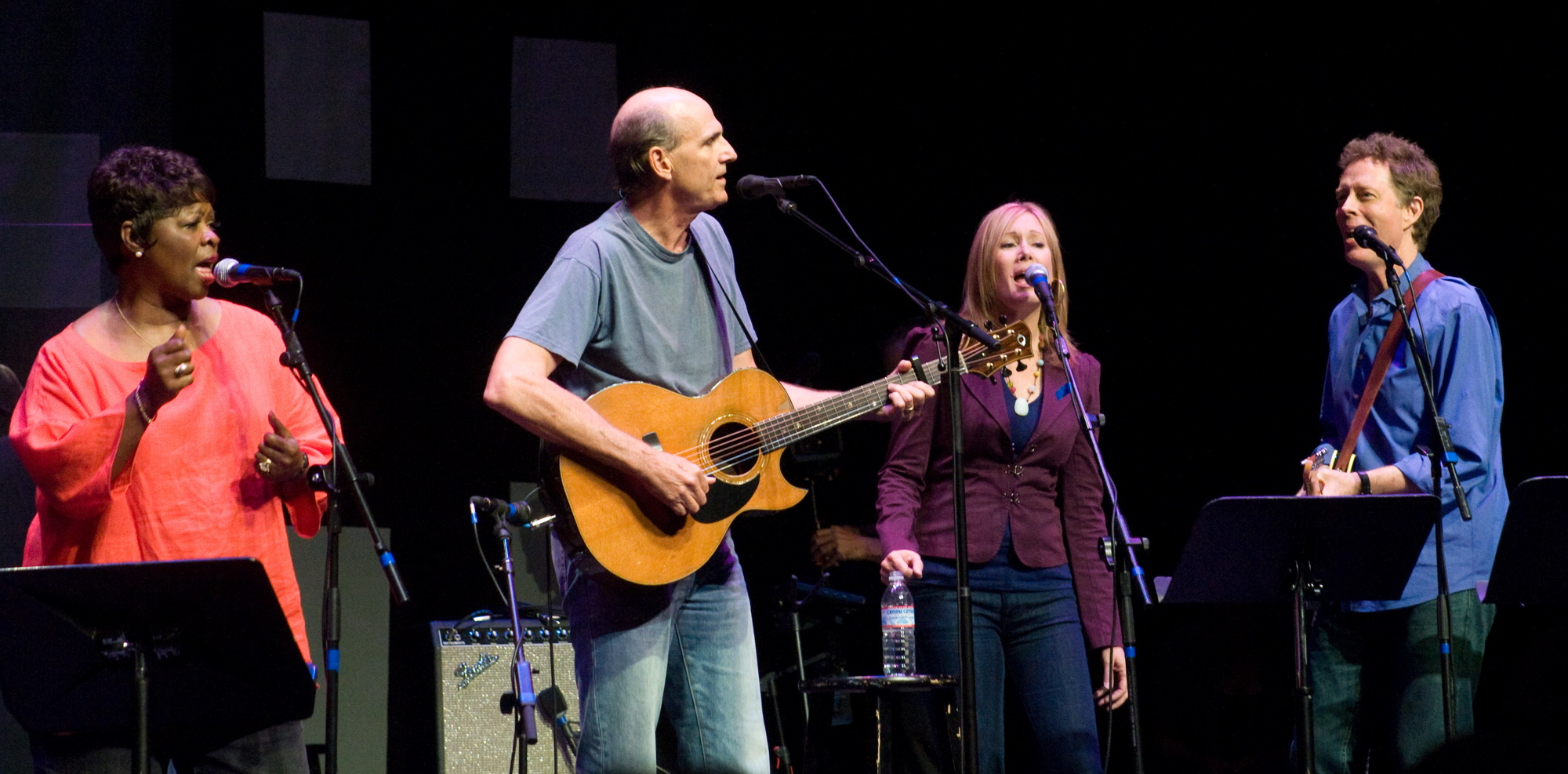
Irma Thomas and James Taylor perform on eTown with Nick and Helen Forster.

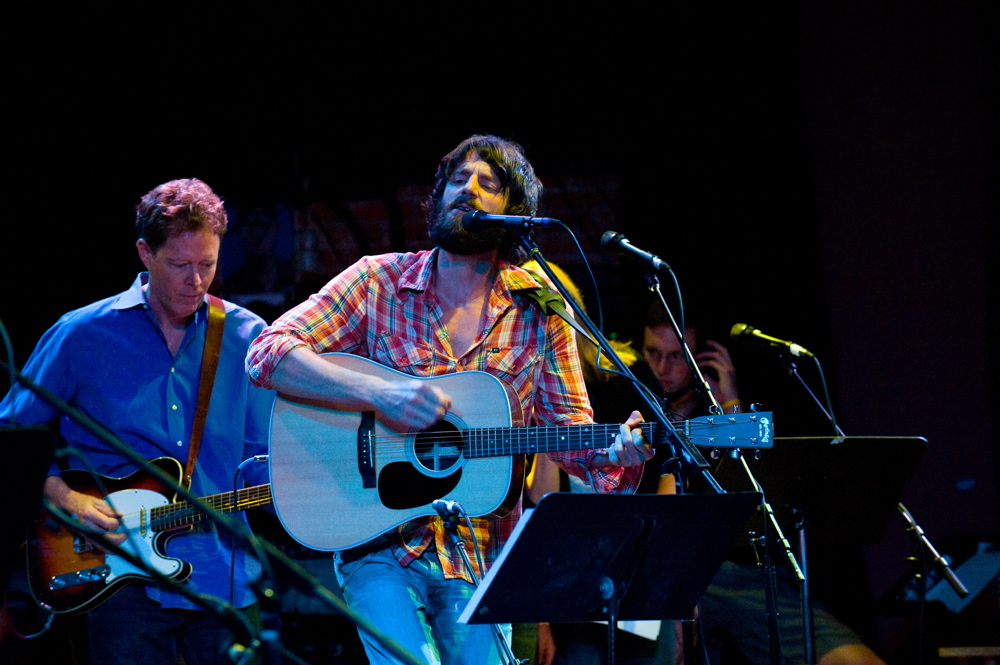
Ray Lamontagne performs on eTown.

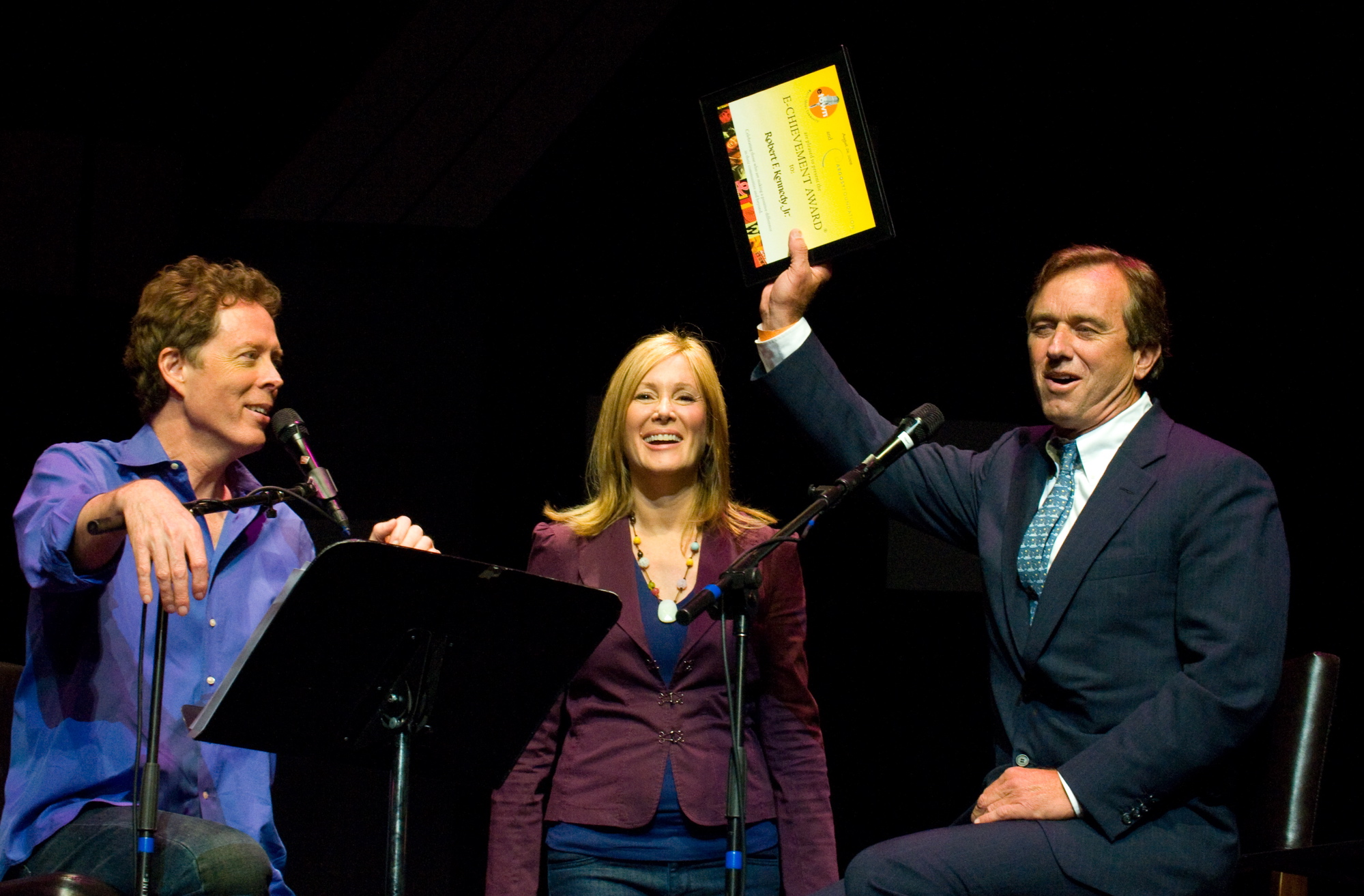
Nick and Helen Forster present Robert F. Kennedy Jr. with the eChievement Award during an eTown show at the Democratic National Convention.

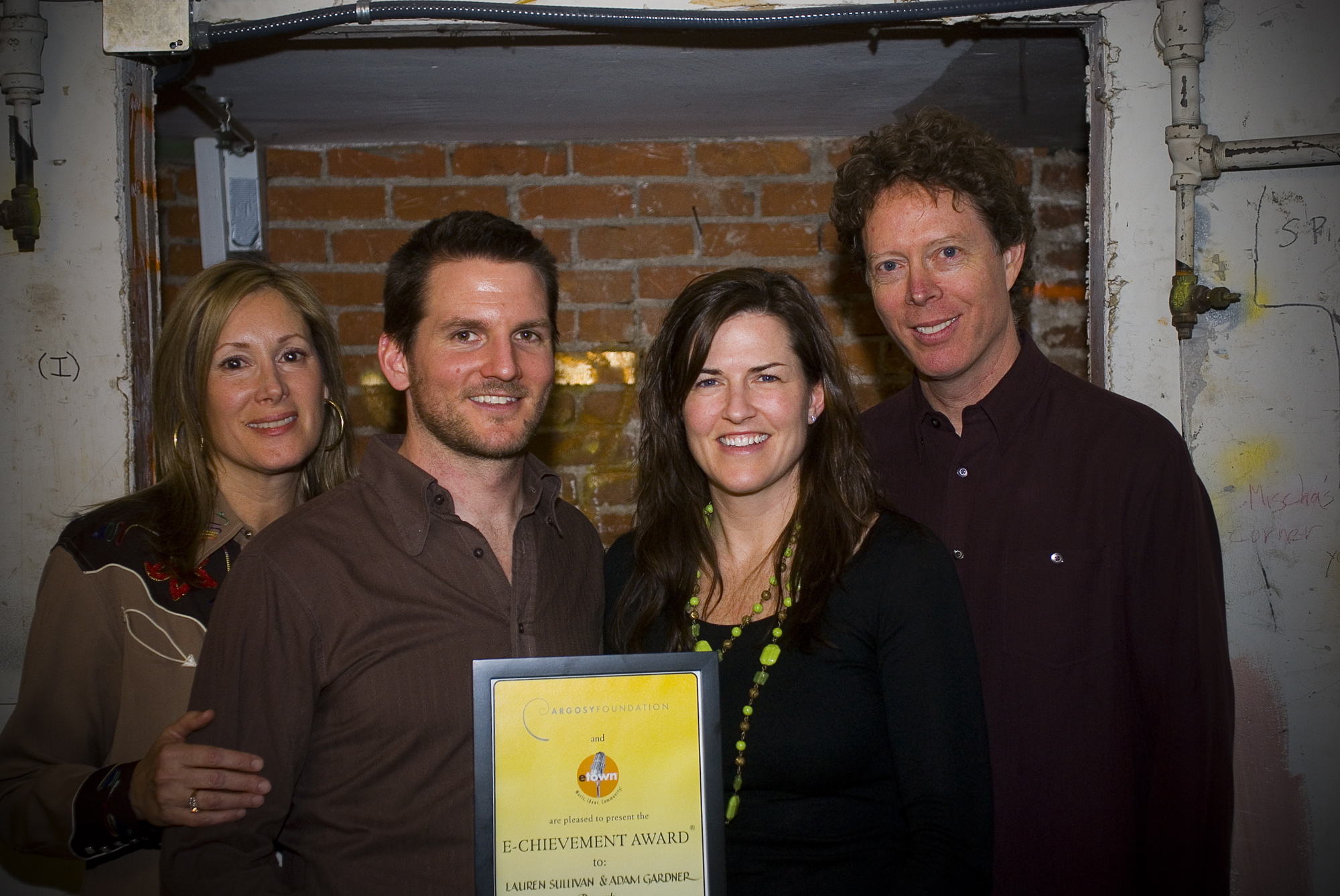
Nick and Helen Forster present the eChievement Award to environmentalist Lauren Sullivan (2nd from right) and her musician husband, Guster guitarist/vocalist Adam Gardner (2nd from left), of Reverb.

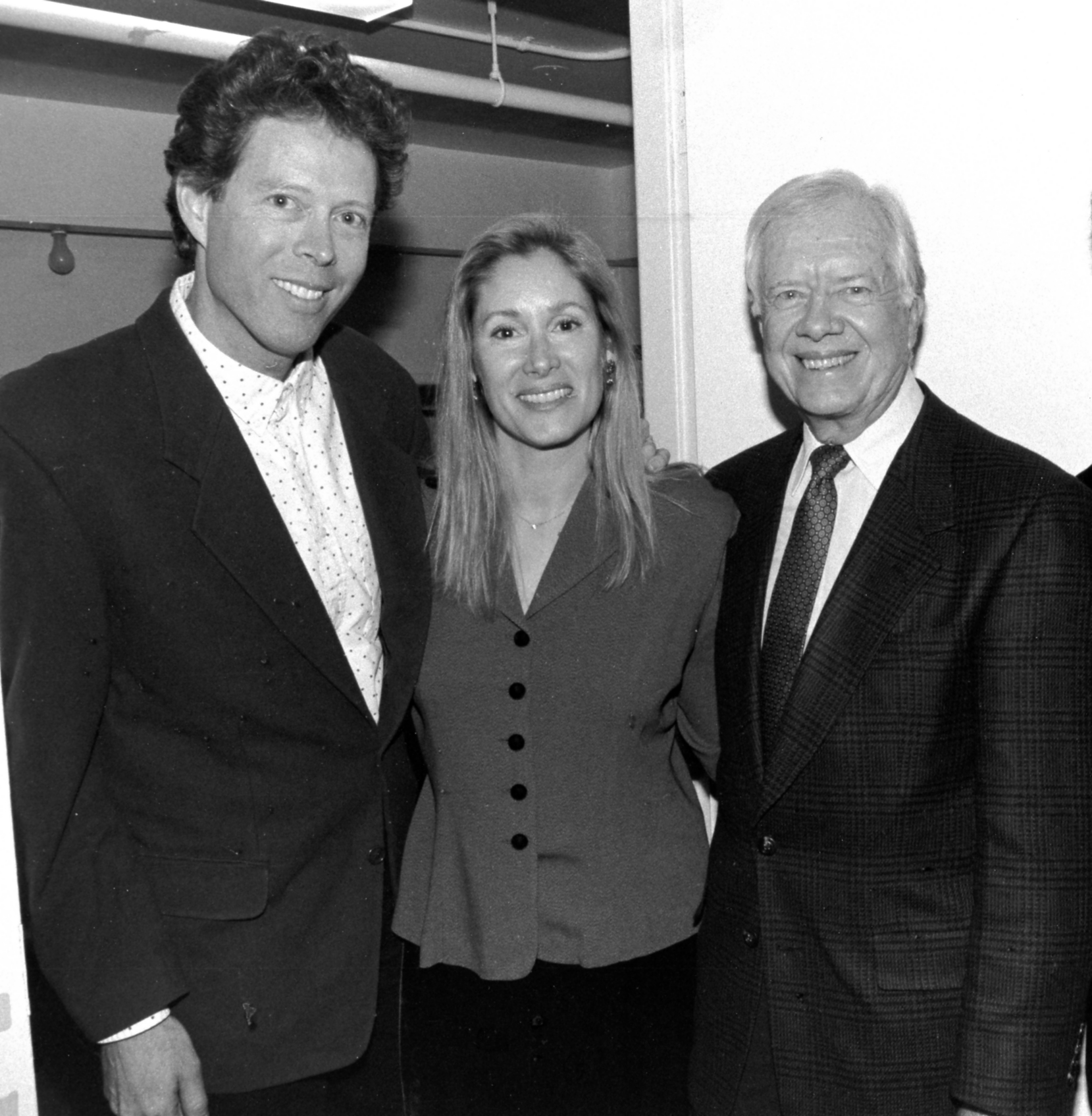
President Jimmy Carter stands with Nick and Helen Forster after a discussion on eTown.
