= Sluz Duz Music =

Studio album by Peter Ostroushko
- Released: 1985
- Genres: Americana, folk
- Length: 44:15
- Label: Rounder
- Producer: Peter Ostroushko

Peter Ostroushko chronology
Sluz Duz Music (1985)	Down the Streets of My Old Neighborhood (1986)

Slüz Düz Music is the debut album by American multi-instrumentalist Peter Ostroushko, released in 1985.

"Sluz Duz" is an Old World sound developed by Ostroushko that combines the dance music of Ukraine and other European countries with American bluegrass, ragtime and swing. The bluegrass band Hot Rize is also featured on the album.

== Reception ==
Professional ratings
Review scores
Source	Rating
Allmusic	3/5 stars

Writing for Allmusic, music critic Steven Thomas Erlewine wrote of the album "... the result is quite intriguing, even if his ambition sometimes doesn't match his grasp"

== Track listing ==
All songs by Peter Ostroushko.

1. "The Last Stand" – 3:45
2. "Friedrich Polka" – 3:23
3. "Marjorie's Waltz" – 4:55
4. "Fiddle Tune Medley:" – 4:19
  1. "My Love, I Miss Her So"
  2. "Farewell to Calgary"
5. "Burnt Biscuit Breakdown" – 4:55
6. "Sleepy Jesus Rag" – 3:44
7. "Slüz-Düz Polka " – 3:45
8. "Katerina's Waltz" – 4:28
9. "Christian Creek" – 4:00
10. "Co. Kerry to Kiev Medley:" – 7:01
  1. "McIntyre's Hornpipe"
  2. "The Mist on the Lake"
  3. "McIntyre's Reel"

== Personnel ==
- Peter Ostroushko – mandolin, fiddle, mandola, guitar, mandocello
- Norman Blake – guitar
- Bruce Calin – bass
- John Angus Foster – bass, piano
- Tim Hennessy – guitar
- Red Maddock – drums
- Mick Moloney – banjo, tenor banjo
- Paddy O'Brien – accordion
- Tim O'Brien – fiddle
- Charles Sawtelle – guitar
- Daíthí Sproule – guitar
- Butch Thompson – piano
- Pete Wernick – banjo, fiddle
- Bruce Allard – violin
- John Anderson – bodhrán
- Nancy Blake – cello

== Production notes ==
- Peter Ostroushko – producer, liner notes, mixing
- Tom Mudge – engineer
- Lynne Cruise – engineer, mixing
- John Scherf – assistant engineer
- Jonathan Wyner – mastering
- Nancy Given – reissue design
