= Red on Blonde =

Studio album by Tim O'Brien
- Released: 1996
- Genres: Bluegrass, folk
- Length: 41:24
- Label: Sugar Hill
- Producer: Tim O'Brien

Tim O'Brien chronology
Rock in My Shoe (1995)	Red on Blonde (1996)	When No One's Around (1997)

Professional ratings
Review scores
Source	Rating
Allmusic	4.5/5 stars
George Graham	favorable

Red on Blonde is a 1996 album of Bob Dylan covers by contemporary folk/bluegrass musician Tim O'Brien. The title is a reference to Dylan's 1966 album, Blonde on Blonde and Tim's alter-ego during his Hot Rize days- Red Knuckles, leader of the Western Swing outfit, Red Knuckles and the Trailblazers.

== Track listing ==
All songs written by Bob Dylan

1. "Senor (Tales of Yankee Power)" - 3:59
2. "Tombstone Blues" - 3:41
3. "Farewell, Angelina" - 4:17
4. "The Wicked Messenger" - 2:25
5. "Father of Night" - 2:37
6. "Subterranean Homesick Blues" - 2:41
7. "Everything Is Broken" - 2:49
8. "Man Gave Names to All the Animals" - 4:24
9. "Masters of War" - 3:22
10. "Oxford Town" - 1:52
11. "Maggie's Farm" - 3:20
12. "Forever Young" - 2:29
13. "Lay Down Your Weary Tune" - 3:28

== Personnel ==
=== Musicians ===
- Tim O'Brien - Bouzouki, Fiddle, Mandolin, Vocals
- Steve Cohn - Accordion
- Charlie Cushman - Banjo
- Jerry Douglas - Guitar, Hawaiian Guitar, Lap Steel Guitar, Guitar (Resonator)
- Mark Graham - Harmonica
- Celeste Krenz - Vocals
- Kathy Mattea - Vocals
- Scott Nygaard - Guitar
- Mollie O'Brien - Vocals
- Mark Schatz - Banjo, Bass, Vocals
- Bob Tyler - Vocals
- Glen Zankey - Vocals

=== Production ===
- Tim O'Brien - Producer
- Randy Best - Engineer
- Kevin Clock - Mixing
- David Glasser Mastering

=== Other ===
- Willie Matthews & Charles Sawtelle- Liner Notes
- Senor McGuire - Photography
- Sue Meyer - Design

== See also ==
- List of songs written by Bob Dylan
- List of artists who have covered Bob Dylan songs
