= Radio Boogie =

Radio Boogie may refer to:

- "Radio Boogie" (song), a 1952 bluegrass song by L. C. Smith and Ralph Mayo
- Radio Boogie (album), a 1981 album by Hot Rize
