= Traditional Ties =

Studio album by Hot Rize
- Released: 1986
- Recorded: 1986
- Genre: Bluegrass, progressive bluegrass
- Length: 33:42
- Label: Sugar Hill Records

Hot Rize chronology
Radio Boogie (1981)	Traditional Ties (1986)	Untold Stories (1987)

Professional ratings
Review scores
Source	Rating
Allmusic	4/5 stars

Traditional Ties is a third album by the progressive bluegrass band Hot Rize. It was the first Hot Rize album released by Sugar Hill Records, following the band's earlier releases with Flying fish records. Critic Thom Owens called the album "arguably their best effort ever".

The song "Walk the Way the Wind Blows", written by Tim O'Brien and included on Traditional Ties, was covered by country music artist Kathy Mattea. Her recording reached #10 on the Billboard Top 40 Country listing.

== Track listing ==
1. Hard Pressed (O'Brien) 2.36
2. If I Should Wander Back Tonight (Flatt, Scruggs) 2:38
3. Walk the Way the Wind Blows (O'Brien) 3:38
4. Hear Jerusalem Moan (trad.) 2:54
5. Frank's Blues (Edmonson, Wernick) 2:37
6. John, Lost (trad.) 2:32
7. Montana Cowboy (Park) 2:42
8. Footsteps So Near (Forster, O'Brien) 4:09
9. Leather Britches (trad.) 2:34
10. Working on a Building (trad.) 3:29
11. John Henry (trad.) 1:47
12. Keep Your Lamp Trimmed and Burning (trad.) 2:46

== Personnel ==
- Nick Forster - bass, vocals
- Tim O'Brien - vocals, mandolin, violin
- Pete Wernick - banjo, vocals
- Charles Sawtelle - guitar, vocals
