= Hot Rize (album) =

Studio album by Hot Rize
- Released: 1979
- Recorded: 1979
- Genre: Bluegrass, progressive bluegrass
- Label: Flying Fish Records

Hot Rize chronology
Hot Rize (1979)	Radio Boogie (1981)

Professional ratings
Review scores
Source	Rating
Allmusic	4.5/5 stars

Hot Rize is a debut album by the progressive bluegrass band Hot Rize.

== Track listing ==
1. Blue Night (David Kirk McGee) 2:23
2. Empty Pocket Blues (Clive Parker) 2:20
3. Nellie Kane (Tim O'Brien) 2:58
4. High On A Mountain (Ola Belle Reed) 3:06
5. Ain't I Been Good To You 2:21
6. Powwow The Indian Boy (Peter Wernick) 3:06
7. Prayer Bells Of Heaven (traditional) 2:57
8. This Here Bottle (O'Brien, Wernick) 2:40
9. Ninety Nine Years (And One Dark Day) (O'Brien, Wernick) 3:08
10. Old Dan Tucker (att. Dan Emmett) 1:20
11. Country Boy Rock 'n' Roll 2:06
12. Standing In The Need Of Prayer (Rusty Goodman) 2:40
13. Durham's Reel 3:07
14. Midnight On The Highway (Pete Sully) 2:44

== Personnel ==
- Nick Forster - bass, vocals
- Tim O'Brien - vocals, mandolin, violin
- Pete Wernick - banjo, vocals
- Charles Sawtelle - guitar, vocals
