= Nick Forster =

American musician and radio host (born 1955)

- Born: May 16, 1955 (age 71); Beirut, Lebanon
- Genres: Bluegrass; folk; Americana; western swing
- Occupations: Radio host; Musician; Producer
- Instruments: Guitar; mandolin; bass; vocals
- Years active: 1975–present
- Member of: eTones
- Formerly of: Hot Rize; Red Knuckles and the Trailblazers
- Spouses: Helen Forster (1991–present); Robin Clare (married 1977–1985)
- Website: www.nickforster.com

Nick Forster (born 1955) is an American musician, producer and radio host. He is a member of the bluegrass band Hot Rize and founder and host of the syndicated radio program eTown.

== Early life ==
Nick Forster was born in Beirut, Lebanon, to Bayard and Clare (nee Chanler) Forster (granddaughter of Lewis Stuyvesant Chanler). At the time, his father was stationed in Lebanon with the US State Department. He was raised in the Hudson River Valley of New York. At age ten, he started playing drums but then soon switched to guitar.

== Musical career ==
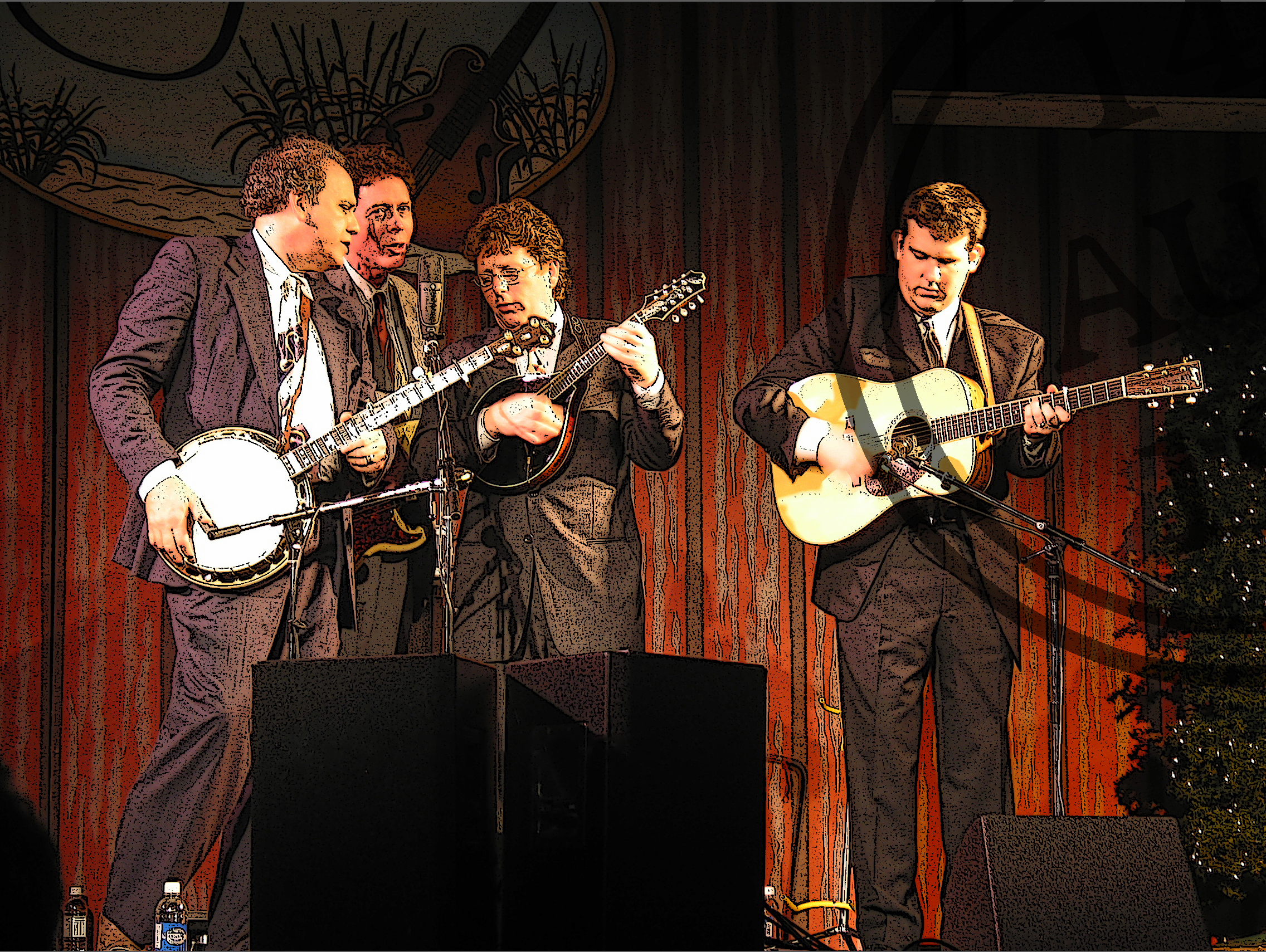
Hot Rize in 2004: Pete Wernick, Nick Forster, Tim O'Brien, Bryan Sutton

In 1975, Forster moved to Colorado, working as an instrument repairman at the Denver Folklore Center. In 1978, he joined Tim O'Brien, Charles Sawtelle, and Pete Wernick in the American bluegrass band Hot Rize, where he switched from playing acoustic guitar to electric bass. The band released eleven albums, six as Hot Rize, three live albums, and two as their comedic/western swing alter ego group Red Knuckles and the Trailblazers, in which Forster assumes the role of Wendell Mercantile. In 1990, they received the first Entertainer of the Year Award issued by the International Bluegrass Music Association. Their 1990 album Take It Home was nominated for a Grammy Award for Best Bluegrass Album.

After the band disbanded in 1990, Forster toured with Sam Bush and John Cowan before rejoining with Tim O'Brien.

Forster is a two-time inductee into the Colorado Music Hall of Fame, and in 2025, Hot Rize was inducted into the International Bluegrass Musicians Association Hall of Fame.

== eTown ==
While touring in 1990 and 1991, Forster developed the idea for a radio show which would combine live-performance music and discussion of environmental issues. eTown was founded on Earth Day, 1991, by Forster and his wife, Helen Forster, who serves as co-host and executive producer of the show. eTown produces a syndicated weekly radio show that features live roots music plus conversations about environmental and community issues. It is broadcast via National Public Radio, community radio stations, and commercial radio. As part of the show's house band, the eTones, Forster plays acoustic and electric guitar, mandolin, banjo, pedal steel and other stringed instruments.

== Personal life ==
Forster has three daughters, including musician Erica Forster, and three grandchildren. In 1987, Forster met Helen Suback backstage at the Telluride Bluegrass Festival. They married in 1991, a month after eTown's first show. They live in Boulder, Colorado.

Forster is also a founding board member of the Live Music Society and Create Boulder, an arts advocacy nonprofit.

== Discography ==
=== With Hot Rize ===
==== Studio albums ====
- Hot Rize (1979)
- Radio Boogie (1981)
- The French Way (album)|The French Way (as Red Knuckles and the Trailblazers, 1984)
- Traditional Ties (1986)
- Untold Stories (1987)
- Shades Of The Past (album)|Shades Of The Past (as Red Knuckles and the Trailblazers, 1988)
- Take It Home (1990)
- When I'm Free (2014)

==== Live albums ====
- Hot Rize/Red Knuckles and the Trailblazers Live — In Concert (1982)
- So Long of a Journey (2002, recorded 1996)
- Hot Rize 40th Anniversary Bash (2018)
