= Take It Home (Hot Rize album) =

Studio album by Hot Rize
- Released: 1990
- Recorded: 1990
- Genre: Bluegrass, progressive bluegrass
- Length: 35:51
- Label: Sugar Hill Records
- Producer: Hot Rize

Hot Rize chronology
Untold Stories (1987)	Take It Home (1990)

Professional ratings
Review scores
Source	Rating
Allmusic	4/5 stars

Take It Home is the fifth album by the progressive bluegrass band Hot Rize.

== Track listing ==
1. Colleen Malone (Drumm, Goble) 3:07
2. Rocky Road Blues (Monroe) 2:13
3. A Voice on the Wind (H. Waller) 3:16
4. Bending Blades (O'Brien) 3:19
5. Gone Fishing (Wernick) 2:57
6. Think of What You've Done (Stanley) 2:24
7. Climb the Ladder (Forster) 2:23
8. Money to Burn (Hutchison) 3:33
9. The Bravest Cowboy (trad.) 2:34
10. Lamplighting Time in the Valley (Goodman, Hart, Lyons, Poulton) 3:08
11. Where the Wild River Rolls (Amos) 3:56)
12. The Old Rounder (Wernick) 3:01
13. Tenderly Calling (Garrett) 4:42

== Personnel ==
- Nick Forster – bass, vocals
- Tim O'Brien – vocals, mandolin, violin
- Pete Wernick – banjo, vocals
- Charles Sawtelle – guitar, vocals
