= Oxford Town =

Song by Bob Dylan

from the album The Freewheelin' Bob Dylan
- Released: May 27, 1963
- Recorded: December 6, 1962
- Genre: Folk
- Length: 1:50
- Label: Columbia
- Songwriter: Bob Dylan

"Oxford Town" is a song written by American singer-songwriter Bob Dylan in 1962. It was recorded in Columbia's Studio A on December 6, 1962, for his second album, The Freewheelin' Bob Dylan.

The song was composed in response to an open invitation from Broadside magazine for songs about one of the top news events of 1962: the Ole Miss riot triggered by the enrollment of a Black student, James Meredith, in the University of Mississippi on October 1. Among other submissions was Phil Ochs' song "Ballad of Oxford, Mississippi". The lyrics and music from Dylan's song were printed December 1962 in Broadside's issue No. 17.

Except that the University of Mississippi is located in Oxford, Mississippi, "Oxford Town" does not mention either Meredith or the university by name. Later, in an interview with Studs Terkel, Dylan said, "It deals with the Meredith case, but then again it doesn't... I wrote that when it happened, and I could have written that yesterday. It's still the same. 'Somebody better investigate soon' that's a verse in the song."

Besides the Freewheelin' release, Dylan recorded a version of "Oxford Town" for Broadside Sessions in November 1962. He also recorded a demo of the song for his music publisher M. Witmark & Sons in March 1963. This version was released in October 2010 on The Bootleg Series Vol. 9 – The Witmark Demos: 1962–1964.

The song has been performed live only once on October 25, 1990, when Dylan appeared in Oxford at the Tad Smith Coliseum on the Ole Miss campus as part of the Never Ending Tour.

== Other notable recordings ==
Richie Havens recorded "Oxford Town" in 1966 for his second album, Electric Havens. Tim O'Brien featured the song on his 1996 release of Dylan covers, Red on Blonde. The alternative bluegrass band Crooked Still recorded the song for their 2006 album Shaken by a Low Sound. Hugues Aufray released a French version of this (and 10 other Dylan songs) in 1965 on his LP Aufray chante Dylan. He re-recorded it in 1995 for his Aufray Trans-Dylan album. Pat Wictor recorded Oxford Town on his album Heaven is so High in 2006.

== See also ==
- Civil rights movement in popular culture
