= Untold Stories (Hot Rize album) =

Studio album by Hot Rize
- Released: 1987
- Recorded: 1987
- Genre: Bluegrass, progressive bluegrass
- Length: 34:46
- Label: Sugar Hill Records
- Producer: Hot Rize

Hot Rize chronology
Traditional Ties (1986)	Untold Stories (1987)	Take It Home (1990)

Professional ratings
Review scores
Source	Rating
Allmusic	4.5/5 stars

Untold Stories is a fourth album by the progressive bluegrass band Hot Rize.

== Track listing ==
1. Are You Tired of Me, My Darling? (trad.) 2:05
2. Untold Stories (O'Brien) 2:46
3. Just Like You (Wernick) 3:35
4. Country Blues (trad.) 2:32
5. Bluegrass Part 3 (O'Brien) 2:39
6. Won't You Come and Sing for Me (Dickens) 3:03
7. Life's Too Short (Delmore) 3:11
8. You Don't Have to Move the Mountain (Whitley) 3:03
9. Shadows in My Room (Forster) 2:45
10. Don't Make Me Believe (3:11)
11. Wild Ride (1:58)
12. Late in the Day (O'Brien) 3:58

== Personnel ==
- Nick Forster - bass, vocals
- Tim O'Brien - vocals, mandolin, violin
- Pete Wernick - banjo, vocals
- Charles Sawtelle - guitar, vocals
- Jerry Douglas - dobro
