= True Life Blues: The Songs of Bill Monroe =

Compilation album by Various artists
- Released: October 15, 1996
- Genre: Bluegrass music
- Length: 51:33
- Label: Sugar Hill
- Producer: Todd Phillips

Professional ratings
Review scores
Source	Rating
AllMusic	4/5 stars

True Life Blues: The Songs of Bill Monroe is a compilation album of bluegrass music released through Sugar Hill Records on October 15, 1996. It was a tribute to Bill Monroe. In 1997, the album won Todd Phillips the Grammy Award for Best Bluegrass Album, as the producer.

== Track listing ==
1. "Molly and Tenbrooks" – 3:13
2. "True Life Blues" – 2:45
3. "I'm on My Way to the Old Home" – 2:08
4. "Highway of Sorrow" – 2:53
5. "Old Ebenezer Scrooge" – 2:46
6. "Memories of You" – 3:06
7. "Rawhide" – 3:07
8. "Can't You Hear Me Callin'" – 4:07
9. "Letter from My Darling" – 3:32
10. "Sitting Alone in the Moonlight" – 3:16
11. "Big Mon" – 3:01
12. "Get Down on Your Knees and Pray" – 3:12
13. "Used to Be" – 2:03
14. "Scotland" – 3:08
15. "Travelin' This Lonesome Road" – 3:02
16. "Heavy Traffic Ahead Bill Monroe" – 2:25
17. "Little Cabin Home on the Hill" – 3:49

== Personnel ==
- Joseph Bartoldus – Engineer
- Sam Bush – Mandolin
- Vassar Clements – Fiddle
- Mike Compton – Mandolin
- Donivan Cowart – Engineer
- Gary Denton – Engineer
- Jerry Douglas – Dobro
- Stuart Duncan – Fiddle
- Pat Enright – Guitar, Vocals
- Lester Flatt – Composer
- Greg Garing – Mandolin, Vocals
- Rainer Gembalczk – Mastering
- Richard Greene – Fiddle
- David Grier – Guitar
- David Grisman – Mandolin
- John Hartford – Banjo, Fiddle, Composer, Vocals
- Bradley Hartman – Engineer
- Bobby Hicks – Fiddle
- Steve Horowitz – Engineer
- Kathy Kallick – Guitar, Vocals
- Laurie Lewis – Fiddle, Vocals
- Mike Marshall – Mandolin, Engineer
- Del McCoury – Guitar, Vocals
- Ronnie McCoury – Mandolin, Vocals
- Sue Meyer – Design
- Bill Monroe – Composer, Performer
- Jim Nunally – Guitar, Engineer
- Scott Nygaard – Guitar
- Mollie O'Brien – Vocals
- Tim O'Brien – Guitar, Mandolin, Vocals
- Alan O'Bryant – Vocals
- Herb Pedersen – Banjo, Vocals
- Todd Phillips – Bass, Producer, Engineer, Mixing
- Barry Poss – Executive Producer
- Pete Pyle – Composer
- John Reischman – Mandolin
- Peter Rowan – Guitar, Vocals
- Tom Size – Engineer
- Mark Slagle – Engineer
- Craig Smith – Banjo
- J.B. Smith – Composer
- Chris Thile – Mandolin
- Elizabeth Tormes – Photography
- Tony Trischka – Banjo
- Doc Watson – Composer
- Roland White – Mandolin, Vocals
