= Charles Sawtelle =

American bluegrass musician

- Born: September 20, 1946; Austin, Texas, United States
- Died: March 20, 1999 (aged 52)
- Genre: Bluegrass music
- Occupations: Vocalist, guitarist, record producer
- Instruments: Guitar, bass
- Years active: 1976–1999
- Labels: Flying Fish, Sugar Hill, Acoustic Disc

Charles Sawtelle (September 20, 1946 – March 20, 1999) was an American bluegrass musician and a member of the band Hot Rize. Sawtelle died on March 20, 1999, from leukaemia.

== Biography ==
A guitar player and vocalist, Sawtelle was one of the original members of Hot Rize. He also played the character Slade in the band's alter ego Red Knuckles and the Trailblazers).

Sawtelle was born in Austin, Texas, but he grew up in Colorado. Before Hot Rize, Sawtelle was a member of the bands the Rambling Drifters (along with Tim O'Brien and Pete Wernick) and Monroe Doctrine.

In Hot Rize, Sawtelle played the bass until he replaced Mike Scap on guitar. Sawtelle also worked behind the scenes to ensure Hot Rize maintained a professional demeanor.

After the members of Hot Rize went their separate ways in 1990, Sawtelle formed the band Charles Sawtelle and the Whippets, including Fred Zipp (mandolin, vocals), Jim-Bob Runnels (banjo), and Dan Mitchell (string bass, vocals). Sawtelle also performed and recorded with Peter Rowan.

Sawtelle recorded his one solo album Music From Rancho deVille while he battled the leukemia that led to his death. His friend Laurie Lewis co-produced the album, and ensured its posthumous release. Besides Lewis, the album features Michael Doucet and Vassar Clements (fiddles), Todd Phillips (bass), Flaco Jiménez (accordion), Jerry Douglas and Norman Blake (guitars), David Grisman, Sam Bush, and Tom Rozum (mandolins), and, from Hot Rize, Nick Forster, Pete Wernick, and Tim O'Brien.

Sawtelle operated the Rancho Deville Recording Studio near Boulder, Colorado, and it remains in operation today as the Sawtelle Recording Studio.

After Sawtelle's death, flatpicking guitarist Bryan Sutton joined Hot Rize for their return to performance, touring, and recording.

== Discography ==
=== Solo albums ===
- 2001: Music From Rancho DeVille (Acoustic Disc)

=== As a member of Hot Rize ===
- 1979: Hot Rize (Flying Fish)
- 1981: Radio Boogie (Flying Fish)
- 1982: Hot Rize Presents Red Knuckles & The Trailblazers (Flying Fish)
- 1984: Hot Rize Extra Added Attraction: Red Knuckles & The Trailblazers in Concert (Flying Fish)
- 1985: Traditional Ties (Sugar Hill)
- 1987: Untold Stories (Sugar Hill)
- 1990: Take It Home (Sugar Hill)
- 2002: So Long Of A Journey (Live At The Boulder Theater) (Sugar Hill)

=== As producer ===
- 1992: Front Range – The New Frontier (Sugar Hill)
- 1993: Front Range – Back To Red River (Sugar Hill)
- 1993: Red Knuckles & the Trailblazers – Shades of the Past (Sugar Hill)
- 1994: Abhi Ktori – Feast of Magic (White Swan)
- 1994: Mary Flower – Blues Jubilee (Resounding)
- 1995: Kate MacLeod – Trying to Get It Right (Waterbug)
- 1996: The Bluegrass Patriots – E Pluribus Bluegrass (Red Feather) – reissued in 2008 with extra track
- 1997: Kate MacLeod – Constant Emotion (Waterbug)
- 1997: Leftover Salmon – Bridges To Bert (Bert)
- 1998: K. C. Groves – Can You Hear It (Goatscape)
- 1998: Mollie O'Brien – Big Red Sun (Sugar Hill)
- 1999: BeauSoleil – Cajunization (Rhino)

=== Also appears on ===
- 1977: Pete Wernick – Dr. Banjo Steps Out (Flying Fish) – guitar on track 6, "Gnu Breakdown"
- 1979: various artists – Tellulive (Flying Fish) – as part of Hot Rize on track 8, "High On A Mountain"
- 1984: Tim O'Brien – Hard Year Blues (Flying Fish) – guitar on track 6, "Cottontail"
- 1985: Peter Ostroushko with the Sluz Duz Orchestra – Slüz Düz Music (Original American Dance Tunes with an Old World Flavor) (Rounder) – guitar on track 5, "Burnt Bisquit Breakdown"
- 1991: Beppe Gambetta – Dialogs (Brambus) – guitar on track 11, "The Storms Are On The Ocean"
- 1991: Laurie Lewis and Kathy Kallick – Together (Kaleidoscope) – guitar
- 1992. Hugh Moffatt and Katy Moffatt – Dance Me Outside (Philo – guitar
- 1994: Peter Rowan and the Rowan Brothers – Tree On A Hill (Sugar Hill) – mixer
- 1996: Peter Rowan – Bluegrass Boy (Sugar Hill) – guitar
- 1996: John Rossbach – Never Was Plugged (Alcazar) – guitar, tenor vocal
- 1998: Tom Rozum – Jubilee (Dog-Boy) – guitar
- 1999: John Herrmann / Tim O'Brien / Dirk Powell – Songs from the Mountain (Sugar Hill) – guitar
- 2000: Si Kahn- Been a Long Time (Sliced Bread) – guitar
