= Steve Horowitz =

American composer and musician (born 1964)

- Born: Steven Michael Horowitz; October 3, 1964 (age 62); Brooklyn, New York, U.S.
- Education: California Institute of the Arts (BFA)
- Occupations: Musician; composer; producer; audio engineer; author; teacher
- Years active: 1993–present
- Employers: San Francisco State University; Nickelodeon Digital
- Musical career
- Genre: Experimental music
- Member of: The Code International

Steven Michael Horowitz (born October 3, 1964) is an American musician, composer, producer, audio engineer, author, and teacher from Brooklyn, New York.

Horowitz is the bassist for the experimental music group The Code International, who has been creating and releasing album-format music since 1993. He is best known as the film score composer for the documentary film Super Size Me.

== Education ==
Horowitz attended Berkeley High School in Berkeley, California. He received his BFA in music composition at the California Institute of the Arts (CalArts), studying alongside or under the mentorship of composers Mel Powell, Morton Subotnick, Michael Jon Fink, and Stephen L. Mosko.

Since 2017, Horowitz has been an active lecturer of music composition and music for visual media (games, film, and television) at San Francisco State University. He has spoken on the subject of music composition and video game audio at various American universities, including New York University and CalArts.

== Game Audio ==
Horowitz is a long-standing audio director at Nickelodeon Digital, beginning his relationship with Nickelodeon in 2000 as an in-house composer for Nickelodeon Online.

In 2004, Horowitz became a contributing member of the Interactive Audio Special Interest Group, developing curriculum and procedure to be used in graduate and undergraduate interactive audio programs.

In 2013, under partnership with fellow CalArts alumni Scott Looney, Horowitz founded the Game Audio Institute. The venture was created to develop and propagate video game audio-focused educational framework, and materials to private individuals and various accredited universities, respectively. The following year, the duo authored the interactive audio textbook The Essential Guide to Game Audio: The Theory and Practice of Sound for Games.

== Personal life ==
Horowitz most recently resided with his wife and son in San Francisco, California.

== Awards ==
Horowitz's creative contributions have made him recipient of various awards:

- 1997: Grammy Award in support of Todd Philips for his role as audio engineer on the compilation album True Life Blues: The Songs of Bill Monroe
- 2003: Webby Award for audio direction of the Nick.com website design
- 2003: Broadcast Design award for audio direction on Max & Ruby Toy Bowling
- 2003: Broadcast Design Award for audio direction on a Wonder Pets! interactive media project, entitled Wonder Pets Save The Day
- 2017: Kidscreen Award for audio direction on Nickelodeon Digital's Nickelodeon: Code a Character
- 2020: Kidscreen Award for music composition and audio direction on Nickelodeon's Do Not Touch augmented reality mobile game

== Discography ==
=== As Steve Horowitz ===
Year	Title	Label
1993	The Code	FOT Records
1997	San Francisco Chronicled 1990–1996	Ponk 016
1999	Mousetrap Live & Elsewhere	Fluff-Tone Media
2001	Mousetrap Plays Sun-Ra	Fluff-Tone Media
2007	Un-Natural Acts	Fluff-Tone Media
2007	The Instant Composers Group #1: Strange Birds	Fluff-Tone Media
2007	Chamber Music	Fluff-Tone Media
2008	Invasion From The Chicken Planet	Fluff-Tone Media
2009	Stations of the Breath	Fluff-Tone Media
2011	Wallpaper Volume 1 (20 Years Of Pure Instrumental Magic)	Fluff-Tone Media
2011	Wallpaper Volume 2 (20 Years Of Pure Instrumental Magic)	Fluff-Tone Media
2012	New Monsters	Posi-Tone
2013	New Monsters Live at Studio 55	Fluff-Tone Media
2015	The Ribbon Of Extremes	Fluff-Tone Media
2016	Child Of Amerika, Entertainment Tonight, Vivo For Mr. Powell	Fluff-Tone Media
2017	Point Cloud New Monsters	Fluff-Tone Media
2019	Duets, Vol. 1	Fluff-Tone Media
2020	Bass Solos 2020	Fluff-Tone Media

=== As Steve Horowitz and The Code Ensemble ===
Year	Title	Label
2008	The ReTaking Of Pelham One Two Three	Fluff-Tone Media

=== As Steve Horowitz and The Virtual Code ===
Year	Title	Label
2006	The Secret Code Of Ethics	Fluff-Tone Media

=== As The Code International ===
Year	Title	Label
1994	The Psychosexual Album	Fluff-Tone Media
2002	Elevator.Culture	Fluff-Tone Media

== Gameography ==
Year	Title	Role
1994	Cadillacs and Dinosaurs: The Second Cataclysm	Composer
2003	Max & Ruby Toy Bowling	Audio director
2007	Wonder Pets Save The Day	Audio director
2008	Dora the Explorer: Dora Saves the Snow Princess	Audio director, producer
2008	Dora the Explorer: Dora Saves the Mermaids	Audio director, producer
2009	Dora the Explorer: Dora Saves the Crystal Kingdom	Audio director, producer
2010	Dora the Explorer: Dora's Big Birthday Adventure	Audio director, producer
2010	Dora the Explorer: Swiper's Big Adventure	Audio director, producer
2010	Dora's Cooking Club	Audio director, producer
2010	SpongeBob's Boating Bash	Audio director, producer
2010	Oceanis	Composer, sound designer
2013	SpongeBob Moves In!	Composer, Audio Designer
2014	The SpongeBob Movie Game, Sponge on the Run	Composer
2015	Super Brawl World	Audio director, composer
2015	SpongeBob Game Frenzy	Audio director, composer
2016	Teenage Mutant Ninja Turtles: Portal Power	Audio director, composer
2019	SpongeBob Patty Pursuit	Audio director, composer
2020	The Loud House: Outta Control	Composer

== Filmography ==
Year	Title	Role
2002	I Bet You Will	Composer
2004	Super Size Me	Composer
2004	Casino Cinema	Composer
2005	Don Gorske: Mac Daddy	Composer
2007	What Would Jesus Buy?	Composer
2008	Where in the World Is Osama Bin Laden?	Composer
2010	The Lift	Composer
