= Radio Boogie (album) =

Studio album by Hot Rize
- Released: 1981
- Recorded: 1981
- Genre: Bluegrass, progressive bluegrass
- Length: 31:21
- Label: Flying Fish Records

Hot Rize chronology
Hot Rize (1979)	Radio Boogie (1981)	Traditional Ties (1986)

Professional ratings
Review scores
Source	Rating
Allmusic	4/5 stars

Radio Boogie is a second album by the progressive bluegrass band Hot Rize.

== Track listing ==
1. Radio Boogie (Mayo, Smith) 2:44
2. Ain't Gonna Work Tomorrow (trad.) 2:24
3. Wild Bill Jones (trad.) 2:12
4. Land of Enchantment (O'Brien) 3:19
5. The Man in the Middle (Campbell) 2:58
6. I Long for the Hills (O'Brien) 2:27
7. Just Ain't (Willis) 2:13
8. No Brakes (Wernick) 2:17
9. Walkin' the Dog (Grimsley, Thomas) 2:40
10. The Sweetest Song I Sing (O'Brien) 3:31
11. Tom and Jerry (trad.) 2:22
12. Gone But Not Forgotten (Knobloch, Miller, Wernick) 2:51

== Personnel ==
- Nick Forster - bass, vocals
- Tim O'Brien - vocals, mandolin, violin
- Pete Wernick - banjo, vocals
- Charles Sawtelle - guitar, vocals
