= Bryan Willson =

Bryan Willson is a professor of mechanical engineering at Colorado State University (CSU) and the founder and director of the Engines and Energy Conversion Laboratory (EECL) at CSU. His research primarily focuses on the development of sustainable energy solutions.

== Career ==
Bryan Willson received his PhD from the University of Texas at Austin in 1988, the same year he joined the CSU faculty. He teaches in the areas of design, energy, and sustainable development. He is the principal or co-principal investigator on over $30 million in funded research; has funded over 350 graduate and undergraduate students; and is author or co-author of over 200 journal papers, conference proceedings, or technical reports.

Willson has worked for over 25 years to develop large scale solutions for global energy needs. He is the founding director of CSU's Clean Energy Supercluster, founder and director of CSU's Engines and Energy Conversion Laboratory; and co-founder of Envirofit International. Willson a co-founder and chief technology strategist of Solix Biofuels, a developer of large-scale production systems for algae-based biofuels.

== Achievements ==
In June 2009, Scientific American named him to its inaugural list of the "Scientific American 10" – ten individuals who have made significant contributions to "guiding science to serve humanity" on a global basis; in August 2009, he was awarded the Maurice Albertson Medal for Sustainable Development (Albertson played a key role as architect of the Peace Corps).
