= Radio Boogie (song) =

1952 bluegrass song by L. C. Smith and Ralph Mayo

"Radio Boogie" is a 1952 bluegrass song by L. C. Smith and Ralph Mayo, recorded at WKPT with The Southern Mountain Boys. It was the title track of a Hot Rize album in 1981, was recorded by John Dankworth in 2008 and Charlie Dore in 2009, has a radio DJ show named after it on CIUT-FM, and in 2017 became the theme song for the radio variety show Live from Here.
