= Bryan Sutton =

American musician (born 1973)

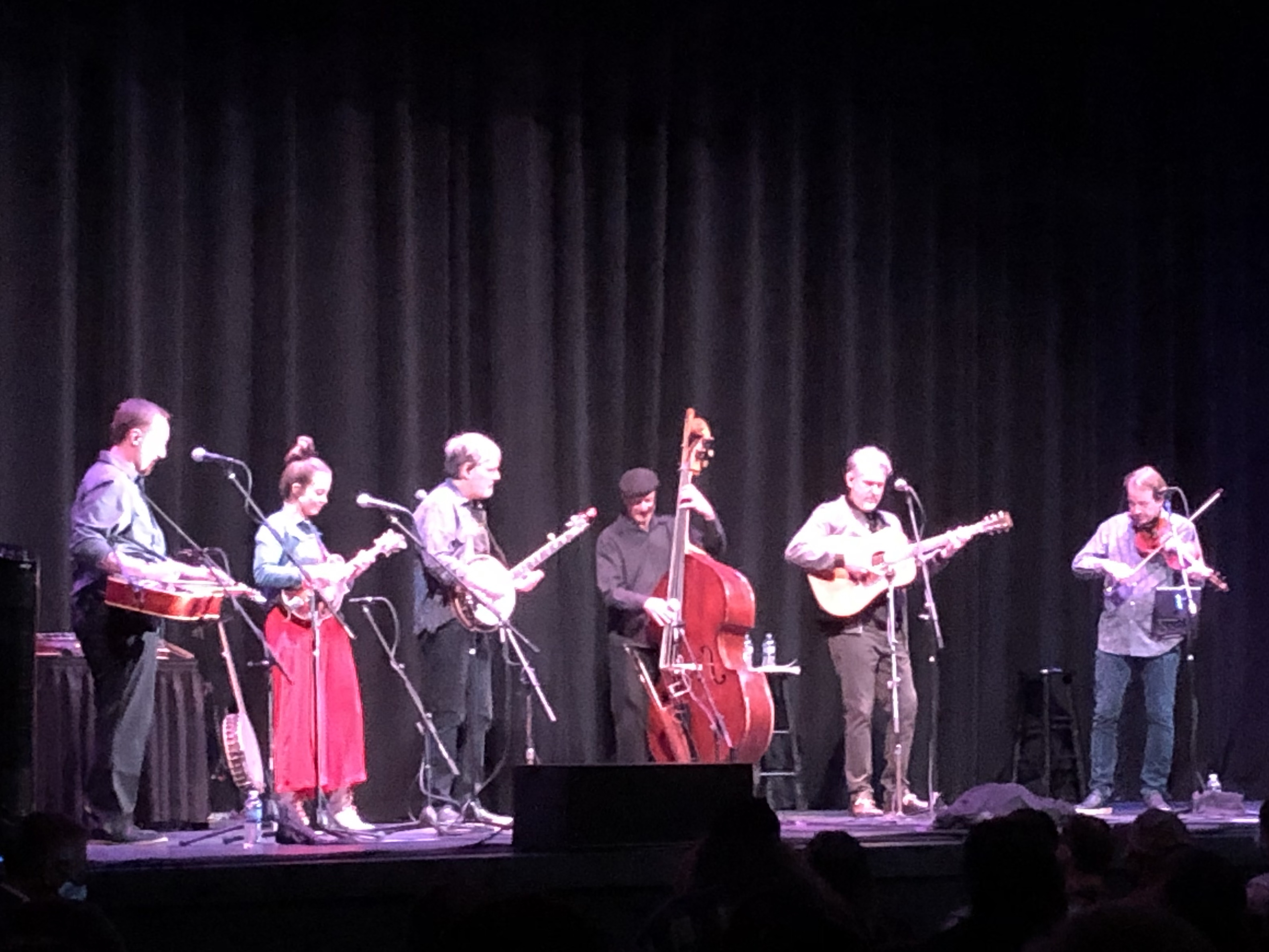
- Sutton (second from right) playing guitar in 2022, in support of Béla Fleck's album My Bluegrass Heart.

Background information
- Born: James Bryan Sutton; 1973 (age 52–53); Asheville, North Carolina, U.S.
- Origin: United States
- Genres: Country; bluegrass
- Occupation: Musician
- Instruments: Guitar; banjo; mandolin
- Years active: 1997–present
- Label: Sugar Hill
- Website: www.bryansutton.com

James Bryan Sutton (born 1973) is an American musician. Primarily known as a flatpicking acoustic guitar player, Sutton also plays mandolin, banjo, ukulele, and electric guitar. He also sings and writes songs.

== Biography ==
=== Early career ===
Sutton's grandfather and father were regionally recognized fiddlers, and Sutton grew up playing in the family band, the Pisgah Pickers. In 1991, he played guitar for Karen Peck and New River, a gospel group. In 1993, he moved to Nashville.

=== Ricky Skaggs ===
Sutton first came to prominence in 1997 as lead guitarist in Ricky Skaggs' band Kentucky Thunder when Skaggs returned to bluegrass. Sutton eventually left the band to focus on session work.

=== Hot Rize ===
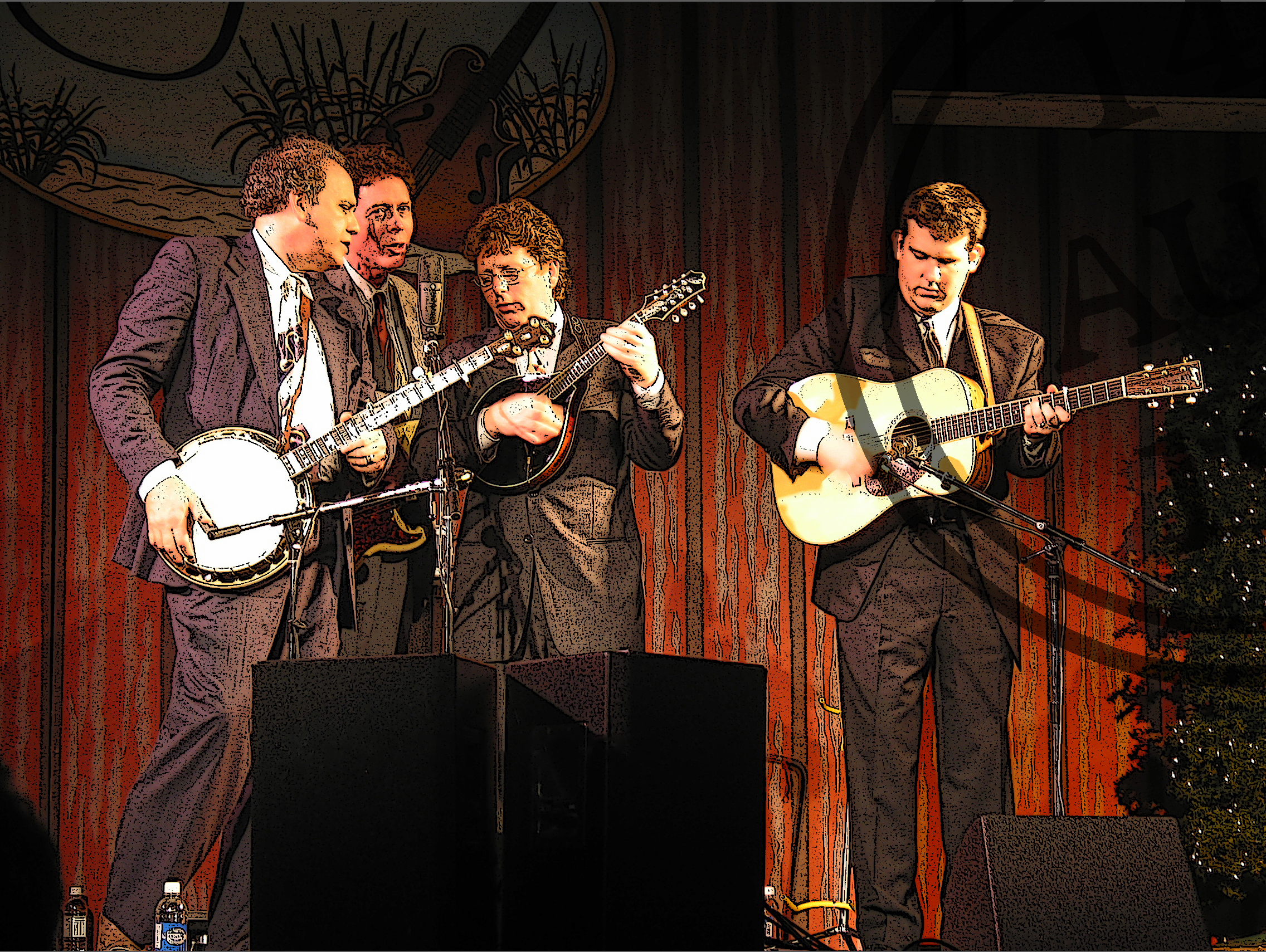
Hot Rize in 2004: Pete Wernick, Nick Forster, Tim O'Brien, Bryan Sutton

Bryan was asked to join the bluegrass quartet Hot Rize in 2002. He has toured and recorded with them ever since, and has only missed one show since they re-formed.

=== Session work and touring ===
In addition to Skaggs and Hot Rize, Sutton has toured with the Dixie Chicks, Jerry Douglas, Sam Bush, Béla Fleck, Chris Thile, Tony Rice and others.

In 2007-08, Sutton toured with Chris Thile & The How to Grow a Band, a project which later turned into the Punch Brothers.

Bryan recently produced a record for Della Mae and the Cash Cabin. His style is a unique blend of staccato mixed with powerful chromatic and melodic movements which is integrated into the more common bluegrass, blues and folk leads that are common to the genre.

=== Other projects ===
In June, 2011 he launched the Online Bluegrass Guitar School with Bryan Sutton, as part of the ArtistWorks Academy of Bluegrass.

In 2013, Sutton recorded the album Ready for the Times with T. Michael Coleman and David Holt. They recorded the album as a tribute to Doc Watson. The trio got together in 2011, and have performed frequently under the name Deep River Rising.

=== Recordings ===
For Almost Live, Sutton was joined by 17 guest musicians, including Béla Fleck (banjo), Jerry Douglas (resonator guitar), Russ Barenberg (guitar), Chris Thile (mandolin), and Stuart Duncan (fiddle).

Sutton's album Into My Own featured guests Bill Frisell (guitar), Ronnie McCoury (mandolin), and Noam Pikelny (banjo).

On 2016's The More I Learn, Sutton continued to develop and showcase his singing and songwriting skills. The album prominently features Bryan Sutton Band members Casey Campbell (mandolin), Mike Barnett (fiddle), and Sam Grisman (bass).

== Awards ==
- 2000 - IBMA Guitar Player of the Year
- 2003 - IBMA Guitar Player of the Year
- 2004 - IBMA Guitar Player of the Year
- 2005 - IBMA Guitar Player of the Year
- 2006 - IBMA Guitar Player of the Year
- 2007 - Grammy Award for Best Country Instrumental Performance for Whiskey Before Breakfast w/ Doc Watson. The song was recorded using 3 vintage Neumann microphones and a laptop in a Colorado hotel room by Engineer Phil Harris.
- 2011 - IBMA Guitar Player of the Year
- 2013 - IBMA Guitar Player of the Year
- 2014 - IBMA Guitar Player of the Year
- 2014 - Into My Own was nominated for a Grammy in the Best Bluegrass Album category
- 2015 - IBMA Guitar Player of the Year
- 2016 - IBMA Guitar Player of the Year

== Gear ==
Bryan supports Bourgeois Guitars and performs regularly with his own signature model, a Bourgeois Bryan Sutton Limited Edition. He also uses a Bourgeois "Country Boy Deluxe " model dreadnought, and a Bourgeois "Banjo Killer " slope-shouldered dreadnought, which is another model directly inspired by Bryan. He also regularly performs with a 1940 Martin D-28.
