= Mollie O'Brien =

American singer-songwriter (born 1952)

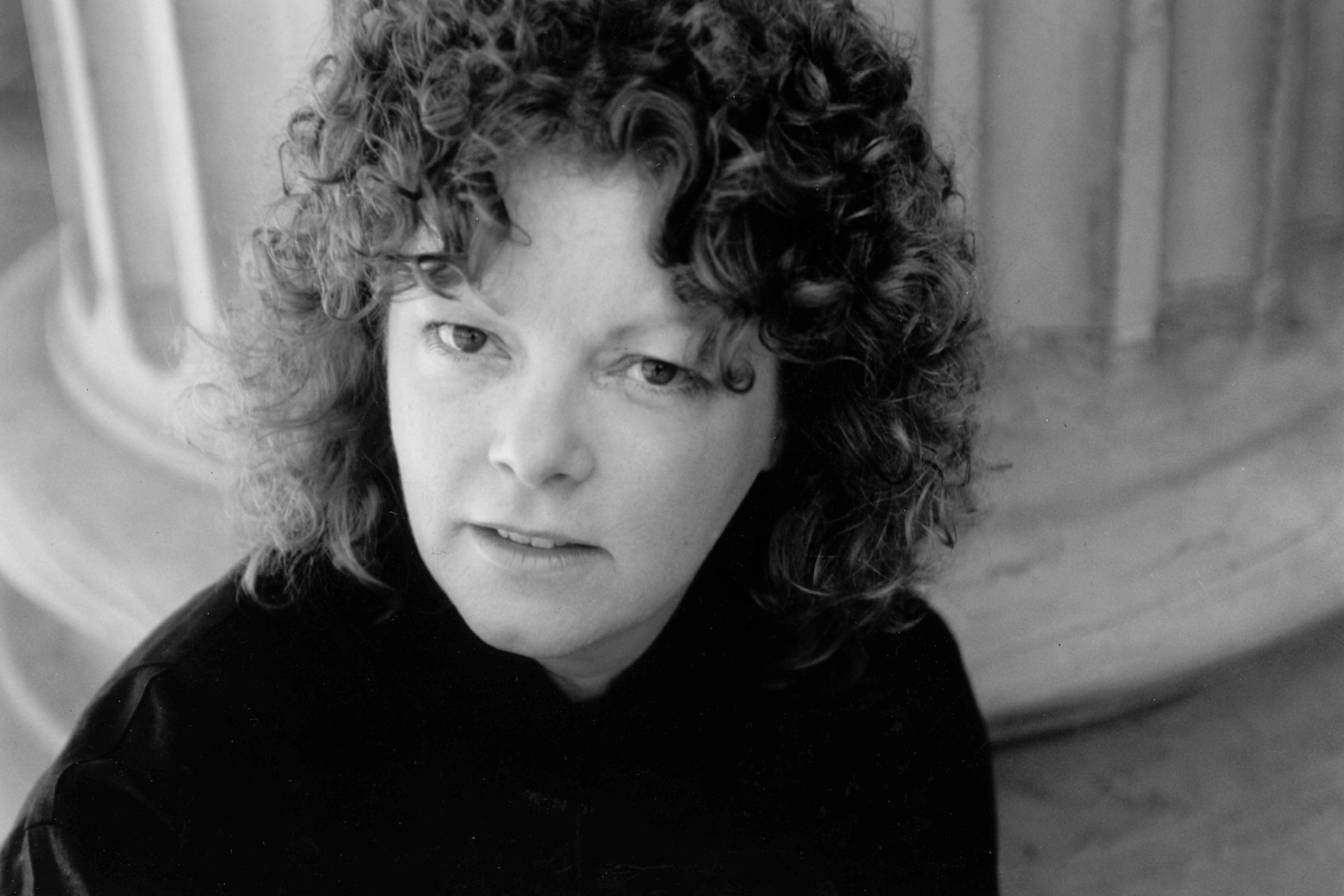

Background information
- Born: October 25, 1952 (age 73)
- Origin: Wheeling, West Virginia, U.S.
- Genres: Bluegrass; Americana; folk; R&B
- Occupations: Singer
- Instruments: Vocals; piano
- Years active: 1980–present
- Labels: Resounding; Sugar Hill; Remington Road
- Website: www.mollieobrien.com

Mollie O'Brien (born October 25, 1952) is an Americana, bluegrass, R&B, and folk singer from Wheeling, West Virginia. She has released a number of Americana albums with her brother, Grammy-winner Tim O'Brien. She has also released five positively received solo albums. She is currently based in Denver, and regularly tours and performs with her husband, guitarist Rich Moore, as a duo. Together they have released three studio albums: Saints and Sinners (2010), "Love Runner" (2014), "Lost In the Crowd" (2025) and a live CD, 900 Baseline. They also released an album with their daughters, aptly titled "Daughters" (2015.) She has regularly appeared on shows such as A Prairie Home Companion, Mountain Stage, and contributed vocals to the Grammy-winning album True Life Blues: The Songs of Bill Monroe. She is known for her interpretations of classic songs by artists such as Tom Waits, Memphis Minnie, Willie Dixon, Chuck Berry, Si Kahn, Terence Trent D'Arby, and Kate MacLeod.

== Early life ==
Mollie O'Brien was born October 25, 1952, and raised in Wheeling, West Virginia, where she was the second youngest of five siblings. Her family was immersed in music, and her mother frequently drove Mollie and her younger brother Tim to local performances by 1960s musicians such as The Beatles, Wheeling Symphony, Count Basie, Dave Brubeck and Ray Charles.

She has stated her brother bringing home the Ray Charles album What'd I Say was influential, and she loved music on AM radio such as "The tail end of doo wop, all that stuff in the '60s you still got to hear before the total transformation of pop music that decimated those people. I soaked up everything." At a young age she sang along with the Lawrence Welk show, and at age 11, learned to play piano and sing "Anchors Aweigh" in tribute to her older brother, then a Naval Academy midshipman.

O'Brien attended Catholic schools. In high school, she and her brother Tim began playing Peter, Paul, and Mary songs as a duo at church and local coffeehouses. She also began listening more avidly to singers such as Joni Mitchell, Bonnie Raitt, Dinah Washington and Frank Sinatra. After several years as a folk duo, Tim moved to Denver, Colorado, to join the bluegrass group Hot Rize. She moved to New York City for 4 years, then back to Wheeling WV for 2 years before finally settling in Colorado in 1980.

== Early music career ==
O'Brien studied voice and theater in college, and after her sophomore year, moved to New York City to spend four years attempting to make it in 1970s Broadway. She eventually took a job in New York City's garment center, where she has stated the locally diverse styles on the radio helped further expose her to new styles. She has quoted "They played old blues and folk music, which to my knowledge, no one was playing [elsewhere on the radio]."

In 1976, her brother and close friend Tim was still living in Colorado as a bluegrass and folk musician, and playing in the Ophelia Swing Band. O'Brien gave the band a place to stay when they played a gig in New York City. "They just completely turned me on end. And I said, 'I have to sing," she recalls. She eventually accepted Tim's invitation to move there, and began singing and earning a living in local Denver and Boulder bars on the R&B and jazz club circuits.

On April Fool's Day 1981 she met guitarist Rich Moore at the Denver Folklore Center. He and O'Brien married in 1983, and formed the R&B band The Late Show, with Moore on bass. After having two daughters soon after marriage, Moore elected to stay home and work a day job as they raised the children.

== Recording career ==
"Orphan Girl"
Sample of "Orphan Girl" off Away Out on the Mountain with Tim and Mollie O'Brien (1994)

In 1984, O'Brien and her brother Tim reunited for a Mother's Day concert, and four years later recorded the duet album Take Me Back. Chip Renner of AllMusic gave the album 4.5/5 stars, and called it "a masterpiece." In 1986 they began performing again as an Americana duo, and produced two more albums, Remember Me (1992), and Away Out on the Mountain (1994). All three records were released on Sugar Hill Records.

In 1987, O'Brien released her debut solo LP, I Never Move too Soon. Also, she joined the group The Mother Folkers for a live performance CD in 1989. She released a second solo LP, Everynight in the Week, in 1990. Tim and O'Brien disbanded in 1996 to focus on solo careers. Away Out On The Mountain was noted, especially, for introducing to folk and bluegrass audiences a little known and unrecorded, at that time, songwriter named Gillian Welch.

=== Tell it True (1996) ===
In 1996, she released her solo album Tell it True on Sugar Hill Records. The album was in the top 10 of Gavin's Americana chart for six weeks, and helped further establish a following of bluegrass and R&B fans.

The album received positive reviews, with the Graham Weekly quoting "The album ranges from very traditional material to contemporary songs, from gospel to jazzy to Western Swing, and even includes a wonderful acoustic treatment of a Terence Trent D'Arby pop song...virtually every one of the dozen tracks is a gem with either Ms. O'Brien's vocal shining or the musical arrangements being brilliant, or both."

=== Big Red Sun (1998) ===
In 1998 she released the album Big Red Sun, also on Sugar Hill. The album included a variety of classic and newer Americana and rock songs by artists like Memphis Minnie, Willie Dixon, and Chuck Berry. Rolling Stone positively reviewed the album, and said "she steers clear of corn in stories about gambling men, love, loss and sexual politics in the rustic South. There's a heartfelt intelligence in this roots-without-whine music and it's unselfconsciously sophisticated." The Washington Post also gave the album a glowing review for her reinterpretation of Americana pop singers like Randy Newman, John Hiatt, and Steve Goodman, quoting "The precision of her phrasing, the smooth flow of her delivery and the sheer beauty of her alto make her one of the best interpretive singers in American pop today."

=== Things I Gave Away (2000) ===
Her LP Things I Gave Away, released in 2000, was released in a similar vein to her previous Americana albums. It also received positive reviews, but less attention in the press. Rhythms in Australia wrote "She has the chameleon-like ability to interpret blues, country, folk, jazz, pop and gospel and has the capacity to make other people's songs sound like they were written especially for her. This is the work of an artist at the peak of her powers."

Also working through Sugar Hill Records, she appeared on the Grammy–winning album True Life Blues: The Songs of Bill Monroe. She has sung numerous times on A Prairie Home Companion, including as a part of the Hopeful Gospel Quartet and host Garrison Keillor.

She has also performed at a number of major music festivals and venues in the United States, Europe, and South America. She has been a regular participant (12 times) on Mountain Stage, which took part in the Celtic Connections festival in Glasgow, Scotland, in 2011. She also toured with the first Transatlantic Sessions UK tour in 2010.

== Duet work with Rich Moore ==
In 2006 both of her daughters had graduated from high school, and she and her husband Rich Moore began playing and performing as a duo. Both sing, while Moore handles guitar. They released a live CD of their performances called 900 Baseline in June 2007, on Remington Road Records.

In 2010 O'Brien and Moore released their first studio album together, Saints and Sinners. Also released by Remington, it features classic American blues, gospel, folk and show tunes by artists such as Tom Waits, Jesse Winchester, Harry Nilsson, Richard Thompson and George Harrison. It was produced by Ben Winship and Eric Thorin, and their two daughters also contributed vocals to the last track. According to a review, "She has performed and recorded with a virtual who's who of modern acoustic music...it has rich music, lyrics and gorgeous singing. Mollie O'Brien has one of the best voices in the business."

In 2012, O'Brien, Moore, and their two daughters, along with Tim O'Brien and his two kids, collectively billed as O'Brien Party of 7, released the album Reincarnation: The Songs Of Roger Miller, a tribute album to Roger Miller.

== Awards ==
Her band Mollie O'Brien and The Blue Tips won Westword's Best Blues Band in 1990 and 1991. She was a vocalist on True Life Blues: The Songs of Bill Monroe which won the Grammy Award for Best Bluegrass Album in 1997.

== Personal life ==
O'Brien continues to live in Denver, and tour and perform with her husband.

== Discography ==
=== Solo albums ===
- 1987: I Never Move Too Soon
- 1990: Everynight in the Week
- 1996: Tell It True
- 1998: Big Red Sun
- 2000: Things I Gave Away

=== Duets ===
- 1988: Take Me Back with Tim O'Brien
- 1992: Remember Me with Tim O'Brien
- 1994: Away Out on the Mountain with Tim O'Brien
- 2007: 900 Baseline with Rich Moore (Live album)
- 2010: Saints and Sinners with Rich Moore

=== Collaborations ===
- 1996: True Life Blues: The Songs of Bill Monroe (vocals)
