= Pete Wernick =

American musician

- Also known as: Dr. Banjo
- Born: February 25, 1946 (age 80); New York City, New York, US
- Genre: Bluegrass
- Instruments: Banjo, guitar, steel guitar
- Member of: Flexigrass; Dr. and Nurse Banjo
- Formerly of: Hot Rize; Men with Banjos who Know How to Use Them
- Spouse: Joan "Nondi" Wernick

Pete Wernick (born February 25, 1946), also known as Dr. Banjo, is an American musician. and member of the International Bluegrass Music Hall of Fame.

He is a five-string banjo player in the bluegrass music scene since the 1960s, founder of the Hot Rize, Country Cooking and Flexigrass bands, Grammy nominee and educator, with several instruction books and videos on banjo and bluegrass, and a network of bluegrass jamming teachers called The Wernick Method. He served from 1986 to 2001 as the first president of the International Bluegrass Music Association. Wernick is also an outspoken atheist and humanist, and at one time led a secular humanist congregation in Boulder, Colorado.

== Biography ==
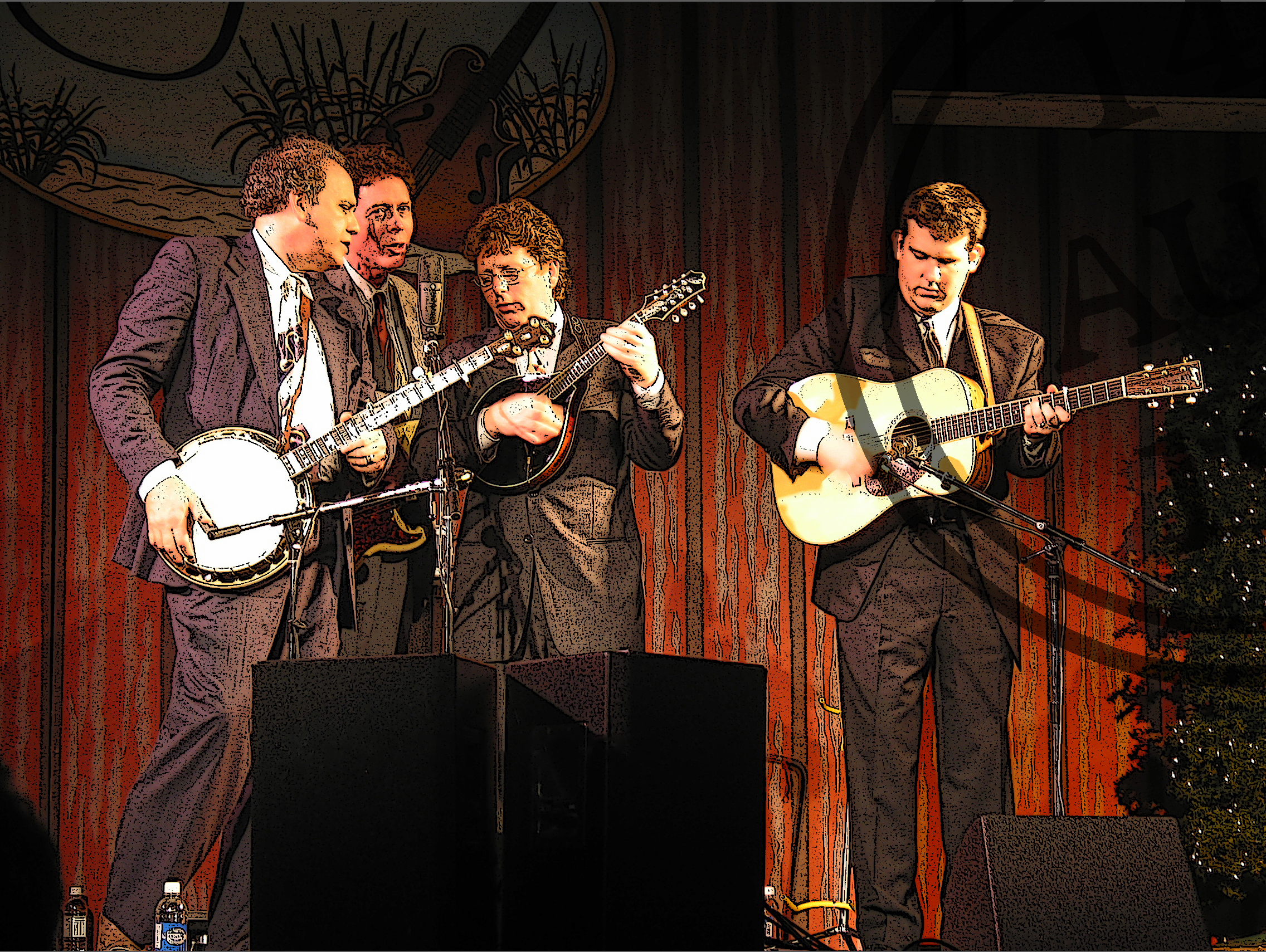
Hot Rize in 2004: Pete Wernick, Nick Forster, Tim O'Brien, Bryan Sutton

Pete Wernick was born in New York City and began playing the banjo at the age of fourteen. He pursued studies at Columbia University, hosting New York City's only bluegrass radio program in the 1960s on WKCR-FM and earning a Ph.D. in sociology, thus the moniker "Dr. Banjo". In 1970 while working at Cornell University, he formed Country Cooking in Ithaca, New York together with Tony Trischka, Russ Barenberg, John Miller, and Nondi Leonard. They recorded four albums for Rounder Records, adding the talents of Kenny Kosek, Harry Gilmore (later known as Lou Martin), and Andy Statman, among others.

In 1976, Wernick and his wife Nondi Leonard (now known as Joan Wernick), settled in Niwot, Colorado, and with Tim O'Brien he began to develop "Niwot Music", consisting only of banjo, mandolin and bass. The music was showcased on his 1977 solo album Dr. Banjo Steps Out. In January 1978, with O'Brien, Charles Sawtelle, and Mike Scap, he started the bluegrass band Hot Rize. Nick Forster replaced Scap in May, 1978, completing the band's classic lineup that recorded and performed nationally and internationally full-time for 12 years, through April, 1990. Hot Rize recorded many Wernick-penned originals, including the standard "Just Like You", and instrumentals "Gone Fishing" and "Powwow the Indian Boy". After disbanding as a full-time unit, the group continued with several performances a year until 1998, the year before Sawtelle's death. Currently he leads the bluegrass/jazz combo Flexigrass, and performs with his wife Joan as Dr. and Nurse Banjo.

Hot Rize was inducted into the International Bluegrass Music Hall of Fame, at a ceremony in Chattanooga, TN in September, 2025.

In 1986 the Board of the newly formed IBMA (International Bluegrass Music Association) elected Wernick its first president, a position he held until 2001. In 2018 he won two IBMA awards: Mentor of the Year, and Best Liner Notes.

Wernick was one of the members of the banjo supergroup Men with Banjos Who Know How to Use Them, a group that included Steve Martin and Earl Scruggs and 2 others.

In 2010, the Wernicks became the first Americans to tour in Russia as a bluegrass act, performing at the first annual Russian-American bluegrass festival in Vologda and Semenkovo, and in St. Petersburg. The duet has also performed in recent years in Ireland, England, Denmark, Israel, the Czech Republic, Germany, Switzerland, and Holland.

Wernick is a prominent teacher of bluegrass, having hosted over 200 music camps since 1980 and still conducting several each year. After starting as banjo camps, since 1999 the camps have focused mostly on bluegrass jamming for all bluegrass instruments. Wernick has produced 10 instructional videos for Homespun and his books "Bluegrass Banjo" and "Bluegrass Songbook" have together sold over a third of a million copies. He also co-authored in 1987 with Tony Trischka, the encyclopedic "Masters of the Five String Banjo".

In 2010 Wernick created the Wernick Method, a national network of bluegrass teachers he certifies to teach bluegrass jamming. As of July 2025, Wernick Method teachers have conducted 1500 classes in 46 states and 13 countries, with student registrations totaling over 17,500.

Wernick is also a survivor of the United Airlines Flight 232 air disaster July 19, 1989. He composed a song inspired by that incident, called "A Day In '89 (You Never Know)"; however, he has not released a recording of it yet. He showed up for the bluegrass festival Winterhawk two days after the crash, having to use spare musical instruments, as his had not yet been located (both were damaged but restorable).

== Discography ==
- Bluegrass Banjo - Music Minus One Banjo (Music Minus One) (1974)
- Bluegrass Banjo (Oak Publications) (1974)
- Bluegrass Songbook (Oak Publications) (1976)
- Dr. Banjo Steps Out (Flying Fish) (1977)
- 26 Bluegrass Instrumentals (with Country Cooking) (Rounder Records) (1987 reissue of Rounder recordings of the 1970s)
- How To Make A Band Work (Mel Bay) (1990)
- On A Roll (Sugar Hill Records) (1993)
- I Tell You What (Pete Wernick's Live Five) (Sugar Hill Records) (1996)
- Windy Mountain (with Joan Wernick) (Niwot Records) (1999)
- Up All Night (Pete Wernick's Live Five) (Niwot Records) (2000)
- What The (Pete Wernick & Flexigrass) (Niwot Records) (2007)

=== Recordings with Hot Rize ===
Studio albums:

- Hot Rize (1979)
- Radio Boogie (1981)
- The French Way (as Red Knuckles and the Trailblazers, 1984)
- Traditional Ties (1986)
- Untold Stories (1987)
- Shades Of The Past (as Red Knuckles and the Trailblazers, 1988)
- Take It Home (1990)
- When I’m Free (2014)

Live albums:

- So Long of a Journey (2002, recorded 1996)
- Hot Rize/Red Knuckles and the Trailblazers Live — In Concert (1982)
- Hot Rize 40th Anniversary Bash (2018)
