= Tim O'Brien (musician) =

American musician (born 1954)

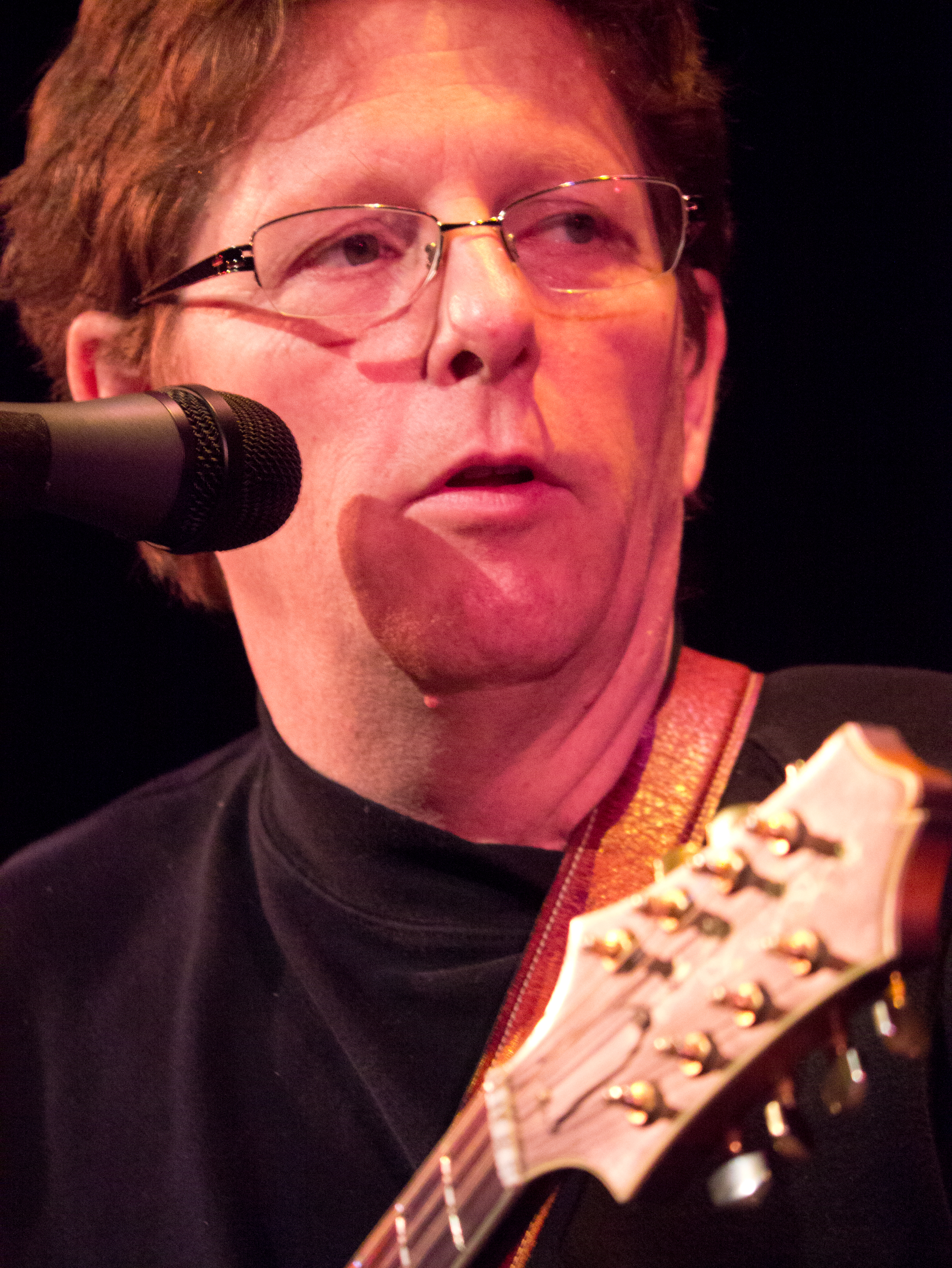
- Knicely's Big Winter Concert 2012; Berryville, Virginia

Background information
- Born: Timothy O'Brien; March 16, 1954 (age 72)
- Origin: Wheeling, West Virginia, U.S.
- Genres: Country; bluegrass; folk; Americana; Irish traditional music
- Occupations: Singer-songwriter; musician
- Instruments: Vocals; guitar; fiddle; Mandolin; mandola; mandocello; bouzouki; banjo
- Years active: 1973–present
- Labels: RCA; Sugar Hill
- Website: timobrien.net

Timothy O'Brien (born March 16, 1954) is an American country and bluegrass musician. In addition to singing, he plays guitar, fiddle, mandolin, banjo, bouzouki and mandocello. He has released more than ten studio albums, in addition to charting a duet with Kathy Mattea entitled "The Battle Hymn of Love", a No. 9 hit on the Billboard Hot Country Singles & Tracks (now Hot Country Songs) charts in 1990. In November 2013 he was inducted into the West Virginia Music Hall of Fame.

== Early life ==
Tim O'Brien was born on March 16, 1954, and raised in Wheeling, West Virginia, the youngest in a family of five children. At the age of 12, he first heard a Bob Dylan record, played by his older sister Mollie, afterwards deciding to take up music. Throughout his teens, he taught himself to play guitar, violin, and mandolin.

In high school, he and his sister Mollie, a singer, began performing Peter, Paul, and Mary songs as a duo at church and local coffeehouses.

== Music career ==
=== Hot Rize ===
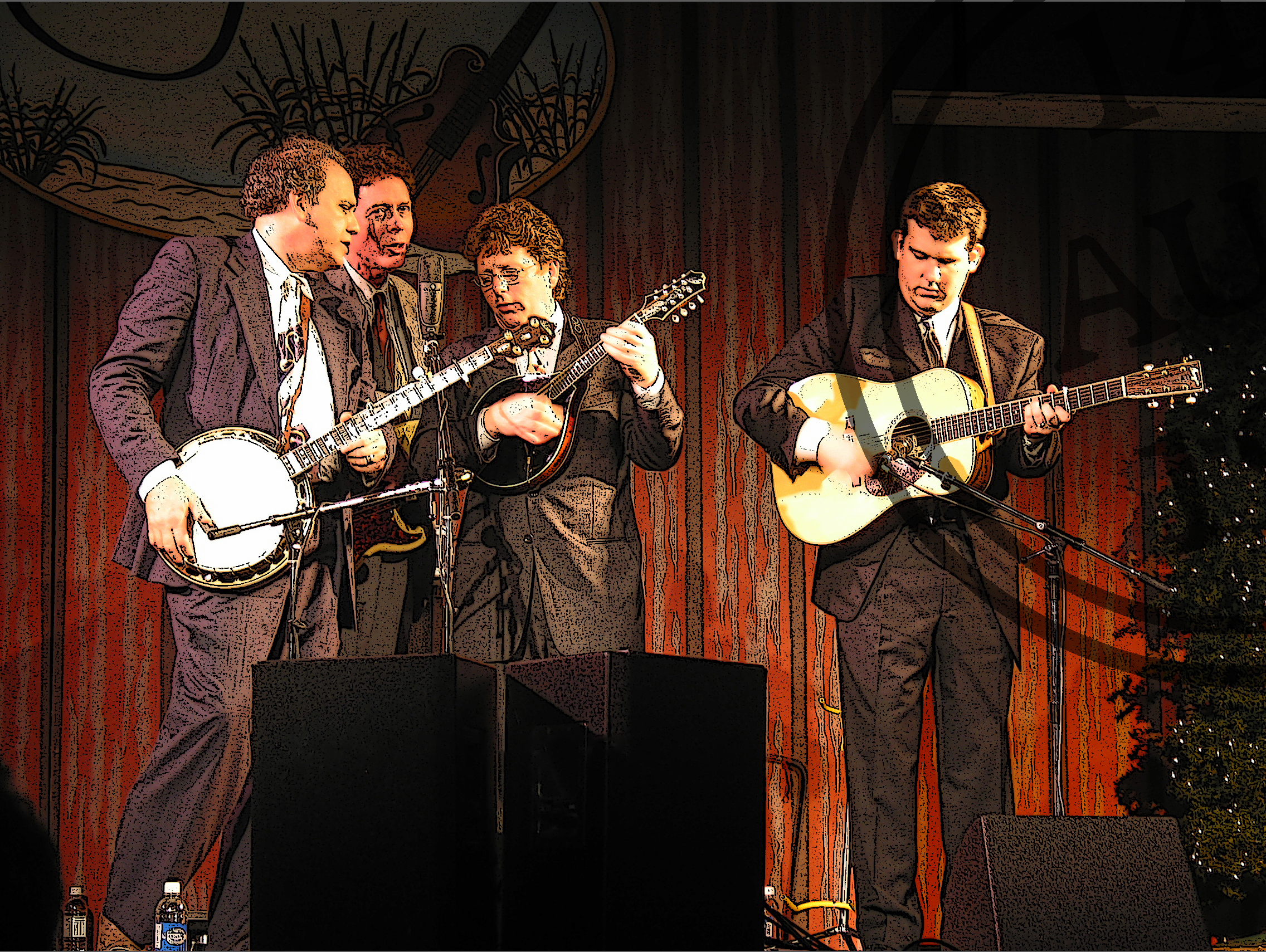
Hot Rize in 2004: Pete Wernick, Nick Forster, Tim O'Brien, Bryan Sutton

In 1973, he dropped out of Colby College to pursue music professionally. He wrote to his mother at the time, saying, "I'm heading west. I know 200 songs now, and I figure if I keep learning more I should be all right."

He eventually moved to Boulder, Colorado, in the 1970s and became part of the music scene there. He played bars around Denver and Boulder with Dan Sadowsky and the Ophelia Swing Band and cut one of his earliest albums, Swing Tunes of the 30's and 40's, with that band in 1977. In Colorado, he met guitarist/bassist Charles Sawtelle, banjoist Pete Wernick, and guitarist Mike Scap, with whom he formed Hot Rize in 1978. Mike Scap was soon replaced by Nick Forster on bass with Sawtelle moving to guitar. Over the next twelve years, the quartet earned recognition as one of America's most innovative and entertaining bluegrass bands. Never straying too far from a traditional sound, Hot Rize stood out with fresh harmony singing, Wernick's melodic banjo playing, and O'Brien's easy-going rhythmic drive.

To broaden their repertoire, the members of Hot Rize would often split their show with a set of classic and offbeat country and western music in the comic guise of Red Knuckles and the Trailblazers. The band would walk off stage, change clothes, and reappear as a different band (O'Brien assumed the role of "Red Knuckles"), with its own songs, fictional back story and humorous costumes. Hot Rize was the International Bluegrass Music Association's first Entertainer of the Year in 1990, and in 1993, O'Brien took the IBMA's Male Vocalist of the Year honors.

In 1990, Hot Rize disbanded as a regular touring and recording band. However, after the death of guitarist Charles Sawtelle, in 2002 Hot Rize was joined by award winning guitarist Bryan Sutton and the band began to once again play limited engagements.

=== Duets with Mollie O'Brien ===
"Orphan Girl"
Sample of "Orphan Girl" off Away Out on the Mountain with Tim and Mollie O'Brien (1994)

In 1984, O'Brien and his sister Mollie O'Brien reunited for a Mother's Day concert, and four years later recorded the duet album Take Me Back. Chip Renner of AllMusic gave the album 4.5/5 stars, and called it "a masterpiece." In 1986 they began performing again as an Americana duo, and produced two more albums, Remember Me (1992), and Away Out on the Mountain (1994). All three records were released on Sugar Hill Records.

Before recording her own debut album, Gillian Welch gave a homemade copy of her demos to Tim and Mollie. "Orphan Girl" and "Wichita" are featured on Away Out On The Mountain (1994), standing as the first published songs of Welch's. These home recordings can be heard on Boots No. 1: The Official Revival Bootleg (2016).

=== Solo career ===
O'Brien, who had already recorded several albums without Hot Rize, embarked on a solo career. He briefly signed to RCA Records, recording an album with them called "Odd Man In", before being dropped. Sugar Hill Records eventually released the album, and O'Brien has not signed to a major since. In 1990, O'Brien also charted along with Kathy Mattea on the duet "The Battle Hymn of Love", which peaked at No. 9 on the Billboard Hot Country Singles & Tracks charts.

In 2010, O'Brien featured prominently on Kris Drever's second solo album, Mark the Hard Earth. He also produced at least one instructional video/DVD of mandolin and bouzouki instruments.

O'Brien joined Mark Knopfler in his Get Lucky Tour between April 8, 2010 and July 31, 2010.

In 2024, O'Brien recorded a duet with Bonnie "Prince" Billie for the latter's album The Purple Bird. The song, "Our Home" was released as a single in advance of the album release.

=== Howdy Skies Records ===
O'Brien started his own record label, Howdy Skies Records, in 1999.

== Style and sound ==
I wanted to do the whole spectrum of folk music from one guy singing and playing guitar or fiddle to a full band with electric guitar," O'Brien said. And that's how the pair (of albums) came out, like folk music bookends. Fiddler's Green tends toward the intimate and traditional, while Cornbread Nation is a bit funkier and tempo-driven. On both, however, old-time tunes sit comfortably next to originals and a few classic country songs by the likes of Jimmie Rodgers and Harlan Howard. I could have taken all traditional songs, but I love stuff like "California Blues" and "Busted," which are like folk songs to me, and they fit with the others, and it shows that what is called country music is just another footstep down the same path. Rock and roll, a lot of that is the same too.

Although naturally left-handed, O'Brien plays the guitar and other instruments right-handed.

== Distinctions and awards ==
- 2014 - Awarded Grammy Award for Best Bluegrass Album for "The Earls of Leicester"
- 2013 - Inducted into the West Virginia Music Hall of Fame
- 2006 - International Bluegrass Music Award (IBMA) for Male Vocalist of the Year.
- 2005 - Grammy Award for Best Traditional Folk Album for Fiddler's Green
- 1993 - International Bluegrass Music Award (IBMA) for Male Vocalist of the Year.
- 1990 - His band Hot Rize was the IBMA's first Entertainer of the Year
