= 1955 in radio =

The year 1955 saw a number of significant events in radio broadcasting history.

== Events ==
- 2 May – Opening at Wrotham, Kent, of the United Kingdom's first VHF/FM transmitters.
- September (Labor Day weekend) – First Sig Alert broadcast in California.
- 22 September – The character Grace Archer dies in the BBC radio serial The Archers; a spoiler for the launch of ITV in the UK on the same day.
- 20 October – Disc jockey Bill Randle of WERE (Cleveland) is the key presenter of a concert at Brooklyn High School (Ohio), featuring Pat Boone and Bill Haley & His Comets and opening with Elvis Presley, not only Elvis's first performance north of the Mason–Dixon line, but also his first filmed performance, for a documentary on Randle titled The Pied Piper of Cleveland.
- 17 November – Creation of the Communauté des radios publiques de langue française (CRPLF) - an association of the French-language public broadcasters of France, Switzerland, Belgium, and Canada, later to become, in 2002, the Radios francophones publiques (RFP).
- 26 November – In Sweden, the national public broadcaster Radiotjänst (modern-day Sveriges Radio) begins transmission, via FM, of its second radio channel in Stockholm, Gothenburg, Malmö, and Örebro.

== Debuts ==
- Apri1 14 – The Kennedys of Castleross debuts on Radio Éireann
- April 24 – X Minus One debuts on NBC Radio
- June 12 – Monitor debuts on NBC Radio.
- August 8 – WPLM/1390 signs on.

== Closings ==
- March 10 – The Silver Eagle broadcasts its last episode.
- March 23 – The Big Story ends its run on NBC.
- March 27 – Hallmark Hall of Fame ends its run on network radio (CBS).
- May 22 – The Jack Benny Program airs its last radio episode and moves solely to television.
- June 7 – Lux Radio Theater ends its run on CBS.
- June 9 – Sergeant Preston of the Yukon ends its run on network radio (Mutual).
- June 30 – Barrie Craig, Confidential Investigator ends its run on network radio (NBC).
- July 1 – Joyce Jordan, M.D. ends its run on network radio (NBC).
- July 15 – Break the Bank ends its run on network radio (NBC).
- October 13 – Dr. Sixgun ends its run on network radio (NBC).

== Births ==
- January – Dirk Maggs, English radio producer.
- February 10 – Jim Cramer, American television personality, hedge fund manager and bestselling author.
- February 23 – Tom Bodett, American author, voice actor, radio host and spokesman for hotel chain Motel 6.
- April 5 – Janice Long, born Janice Chegwin, English disc jockey (died 2021)
- May 22 – Dale Winton, English broadcast presenter (died 2018).
- June 1 – Tony Snow, American journalist, political commentator and anchor (NPR, The Rush Limbaugh Show, Fox News Radio) (died 2008).
- July 9 – Fred Norris, American radio personality.
- July 19 – Karen Cheryl, French singer, actress and broadcast presenter.
- October 4 – Dale Connelly, American co-host (with Tom Keith, a.k.a. Jim Ed Poole) of The Morning Show on Minnesota Public Radio.
- Approximate date – Christopher Douglas, English comedy actor-writer.
