= Guy Noir =

Fictional private detective from A Prairie Home Companion

Guy Noir is a fictional private detective regularly featured on the former public radio show A Prairie Home Companion. Voiced by Garrison Keillor, the character parodies the conventions of hardboiled fiction and the film noir genre. Guy Noir worked on the twelfth floor of the Acme Building in a city that "knows how to keep its secrets", St. Paul, Minnesota.

== Exploits ==
The first Guy Noir segments aired in 1995 and were heavy on tongue-twisters, alliteration and other wordplay. In early episodes of the series, Guy and his "friend" Pete (Walter Bobbie) would often get into fights and end up shooting each other. Both died many times. However, following Bobbie's departure as a show regular, Pete appears to have died off for good.

In later episodes, Noir was a down-on-his-luck detective, who ended up taking odd jobs to get by, such as finding missing poodles. Thrown in with these plots tended to be references to current events. For example, in November 2006, while waiting for a case, Noir contented himself by listening to parts of George W. Bush's post-mid-term election speech. Occasionally, political agents used him for hatchet work.

For the portion of A Prairie Home Companion's season that was performed outside of St. Paul, the setting of Noir's case usually involved the city that the program was visiting that week. In the same skit as the Bush reference, Noir was flown to Hawaii to look for a missing Minnesotan. That week, the show was broadcast from Hawaii.

Recurring characters in the skits included: Sugar (Sue Scott), a romantic interest; Jimmy (Tim Russell), a bartender; and Wendell (Tom Keith), the boy who worked at the deli around the corner.

Noir often ran into a beautiful, mysterious woman during the skits, part of the play on film noir movies. Jazzy saxophone music was played as Noir describes the beauty, sometimes to the point of absurdity. For example:

She was tall, blonde, in jeans that looked sprayed on and a T-shirt so tight I could study her bone structure. I could see she wasn't from Duluth. There were no chinstrap marks on her neck, her hair hadn't been deformed by stocking caps, she didn't have that roll of fat around her middle—her midriff was as tight as the cap on a pickle jar.

and

She was tall and long-legged and her blonde hair hung down sort of like what Beethoven had in mind when he wrote the Moonlight Sonata. She wore a knit sweater and jeans so tight it looked as if she'd been poured into them and forgot to say "When". When she moved, she seemed to undulate under her clothes in ways that took a man's mind off supply side economics.

and

She was tall and dark and so beautiful you wanted to just give her all your money right away and skip the preliminaries.

Noir is the protagonist of Keillor's book Guy Noir and the Straight Skinny, where he falls in with Naomi Fallopian and her get-rich-quick diet pill scheme. The story has many of the hallmarks of the radio dramas.

A 2006 Guy Noir skit, in which some characters had a fictitious variation of Tourette syndrome called "Broadway Tourette's", drew criticism from the Tourette Syndrome Association.

Noir was played in the 2006 film A Prairie Home Companion by Kevin Kline. In the film, Guy's detective career is faltering, and he works as a security guard at a radio show to pay the bills. It is strongly implied that he is taken by an angel of death named Asphodel at the end of the movie, played by Virginia Madsen in a trench coat.

The late Minnesota Senator Paul Wellstone was a known fan of Noir; Noir was his favorite segment. Following his untimely 2002 death in a plane crash, the next APHC opened with a Noir segment, skipping even the show's theme song.
