= Live from Here =

American radio variety show

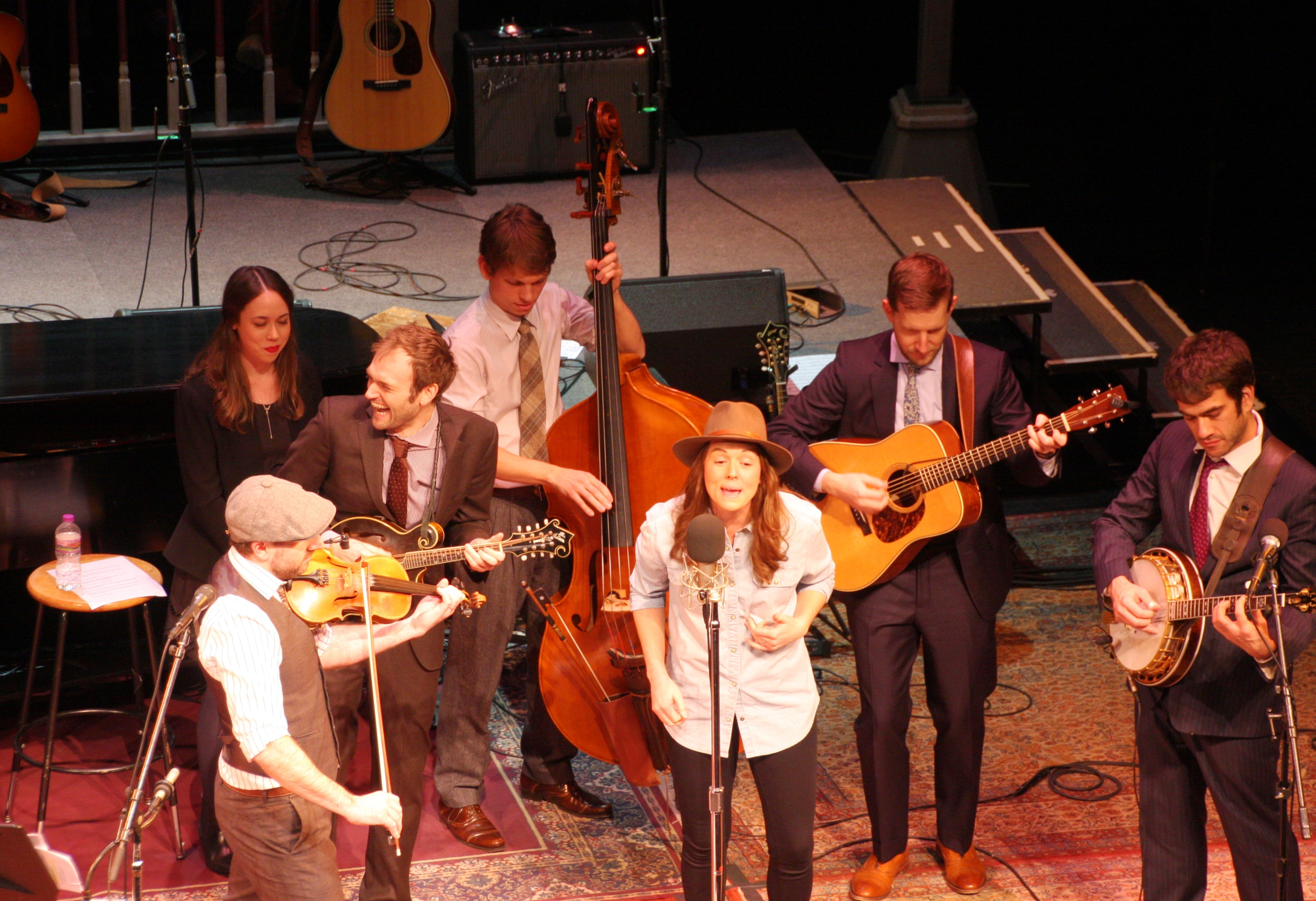
- Chris Thile on mandolin (left of center), on APHC with guest vocalists Brandi Carlile (center), as well as Sarah Jarosz and Punch Brothers. Fitzgerald Theater, 2016
- Genre: Music, comedy, storytelling (radio variety)
- Running time: 2 hours
- Country of origin: United States
- Language: English
- Home station: Minnesota Public Radio
- Syndicates: American Public Media
- Starring: Chris Thile, Rich Dworsky, Punch Brothers Chris Eldridge and Paul Kowert, Brittany Haas, Sarah Jarosz, Aoife O'Donovan, Ted Poor, Serena Brook, Tim Russell, Sue Scott, Fred Newman, Tom Papa, Mike Elizondo, Mike Yard
- Original release: October 15, 2016 – June 13, 2020
- Opening theme: "Fugue State" by Vulfpeck
- Website: livefromhere.org

Live from Here, formerly known as A Prairie Home Companion with Chris Thile, is an American variety radio show known for its musical guests, tongue-in-cheek radio drama, and relaxed humor. Hosted by Chris Thile, it aired live on Saturday evenings from 2016 to 2020. The show's initial home was the Fitzgerald Theater in St. Paul, Minnesota, moving later to The Town Hall in New York City, where it remained until its cancellation the next year.

The show was derived from the historic A Prairie Home Companion with Garrison Keillor (APHC) radio show. The original host, Garrison Keillor, performed his final show on July 2, 2016, and Thile's program began on October 15, 2016. Thile, an American virtuoso mandolinist and singer-songwriter, had a two-decade history with APHC and is known for his work in the folk and progressive bluegrass groups Nickel Creek and Punch Brothers. After Thile made two unprecedented guest host appearances in 2015, Keillor decided on his successor; featured Thile as host again in January–February 2016; and fully ceded his hosting role to Thile in the October 2016 performance at the Fitzgerald Theater in St. Paul, Minnesota, continuing as the show's Executive Producer. Thile's new program presented expanded musical and comedic elements, retaining the template of the earlier program (e.g., its then-present acting and sound effect cast, and "sponsorships" from fictitious companies), but without such features as its earlier signatures "Lives of the Cowboys" and "Guy Noir, Private Eye" series, and "News from Lake Wobegon" monologue.

== Program host ==
Chris Thile, born in 1981, is an American virtuoso mandolinist and singer-songwriter known for his folk and progressive bluegrass work in the trio Nickel Creek and the quintet Punch Brothers. A child prodigy in music—self-described as "begging [his] parents for a mandolin from the time [he] was 2" and picking up the mandolin for the first time at the age of 5—Thile was one of a trio, with siblings Sara and Sean Watkins, home-schooled California children from musical backgrounds, who formed the group Nickel Creek with Thile's father in 1989. An acoustic group, it continues as a trio to the present day, with Thile's participation alongside his more recent acoustic quintet Punch Brothers, both variously described using terms such as folk, progressive, bluegrass, "newgrass," and roots music. Thile was awarded BBC's Folk Musician of the Year award in 2007, a MacArthur Fellowship "genius" award in 2012, and eight Grammy Award nominations, four of which he won for Best Album in 1997, 2002, 2013, and 2015 (in the categories of Bluegrass, Contemporary Folk, Folk, and Contemporary Instrumental, respectively). Garrison Keillor's personal opinion is that Thile is "the great bluegrass performer of our time." As well, others have observed that "[t]hough charming and cheery, Thile is by nature deeply competitive," and that he understands the business side of matters: for example, that the size of audiences the show attracts will matter.

== History ==
=== History with APHC ===
==== Guest performances ====
Thile first performed with Garrison Keillor on A Prairie Home Companion in 1996 at age 15. Over the next two decades, Thile returned to APHC eight times (according to the program's website), performing both as a solo artist and as a part of the groups Nickel Creek and Punch Brothers. These guest appearances included performances at the programs home venue, the Fitzgerald Theater, and at tour venues. Programs in which Thile participated that received press coverage or are otherwise sourced and noteworthy appear below.

- May 11, 1996: At The Fitzgerald Theater in St. Paul, Minnesota. In the Young Artists Showcase, Thile as a 15-year old. With regulars Tim Russell, Chris Forth, Tom Keith and "The Guys All-Star Shoe Band" (Richard Dworsky, Andy Stein, Pat Donohue, Greg Hippen, and Arnie Kinsella), and other guests Kate MacKenzie, Michael Cleveland, and Seamus Egan and Solas (Karan Casey, John Doyle, Winifred Horan, and John Williams). Thile performed his songs Shadow Ridge (1992), What's the Matter with the Mill? (1996), and Faith River (1996), Keillor's song Greenland Whale Fisheries (1996), traditional and other songs (e.g., by Bill Monroe and MacKenzie) including Stoney Lonesome, Mother the Queen of My Heart (1933), The Sweetest Gift A Mother's Smile, Don't this Road look Rough and Rocky, Wheel Hoss, and The Red River Valley (1879), as well as the Powdermilk Biscuit Theme.
- June 11, 2016: At the Ravinia Festival, in Highland Park, Illinois. With Punch Brothers.

==== Trial guest hosting ====
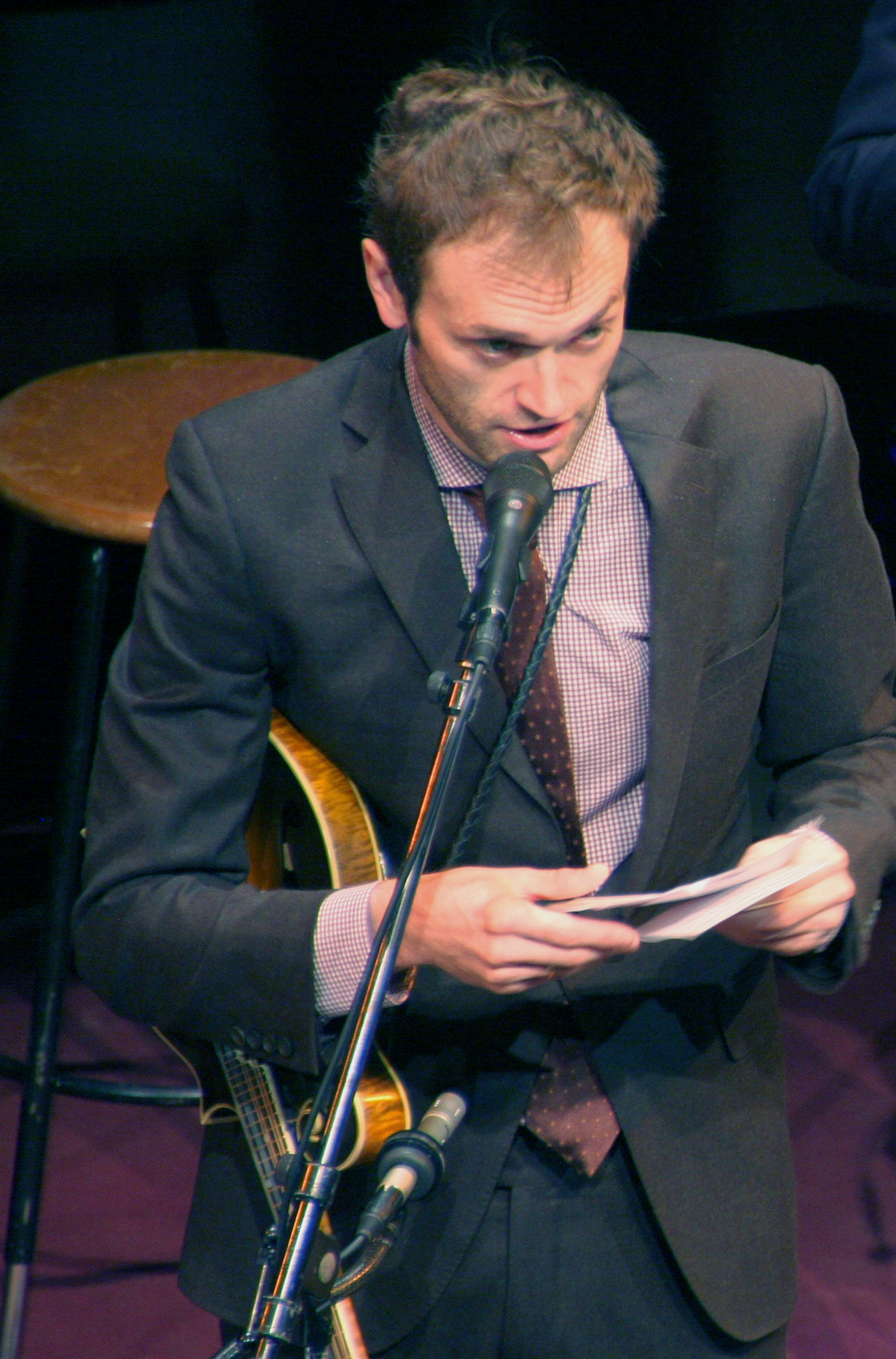
Thile as guest host in January 2016

When Keillor announced in November 2014 that he would absent himself from APHC for "only the second time in decades," he yielded the host's microphone to Thile for these guest host appearances. Thile began these appearances in 2015 and appeared a total of 4 times in the twelve months thereafter, the final two guest host spots being on January 30 and February 6, 2016.

The guest host appearances gave an indication of the type of crew that Thile would assemble, the kinds of guests he would attract, and the style in which he might host (see Format and Cast, below). The hosted programs were on the following dates, and featured the following guest artists:

- January 30, 2016, with Thile's fellow Punch Brothers group members, with musical guests Brandi Carlile, Ben Folds and Sarah Jarosz. A special comedy spot was done by comedian Maria Bamford.
- February 6, 2016, again with Punch Brothers and Sarah Jarosz, with musical guests Paul Simon and Andrew Bird, with special comedy again from Maria Bamford. Thile also covered Kendrick Lamar's song about police brutality, Alright, to some social media criticism, about which he later said, "I would readily admit that my love of the song kind of blinded me," and "I think it was a bad call." Thile is described as having "test dr[iven]" his idea for a newly penned Song of the Week, with themes "tailored to current events," in his performance of "Omahallelujah," about Denver Broncos quarterback Peyton Manning during this episode.

==== Final Keillor program ====
In 2015, Keillor announced that he would step down from hosting the program and designated Chris Thile as the new host. Keillor's final episode of the show was recorded live on July 1, 2016, at the Hollywood Bowl in California for an audience of 18,000 fans and broadcast the next day. Keillor retained artistic rights and trademark to the show's name as well as some distribution rights and rights to retail items connected with A Prairie Home Companion. Thile made his debut as permanent host on October 15, 2016.

==== Name change ====
In November 2017, Minnesota Public Radio severed all business ties with former APHC host Garrison Keillor over unspecified "inappropriate behavior with an individual who worked with him." The Minnesota Public Radio website listed the show under the working title The Show with Chris Thile, as the trademark for A Prairie Home Companion is held by Keillor, not MPR. Thile addressed the situation on the December 2 installment of the series, and Thile began using a new theme, "Radio Boogie".

The show aired under the placeholder title of The Show with Chris Thile for the next two Saturdays. Finally, on December 16, Thile announced the show's new name as Live from Here.

=== New APHC format ===
Thile has referred to the program that Keillor created as a "truly great wor[k] of art" and so "immortal," so that he would "keep using the template [Keillor] created to tell each other stories and to escape from our daily cares. Even so, Andrew Leahy of the Rolling Stone wrote that Thile had added to the mandate of "preserving the show's appeal" a further one of "revising its structure and broadening its reach to younger generations." Hence, the program continued to present a variety of program elements, including music, and storytelling, comedic and otherwise (see following), but Thile had indicated some changes in direction, and others were noted in early reviews. Absent from the new program was the "Lives of the Cowboys" sketch, and the signature weekly "News from Lake Wobegon" monologues from Garrison Keillor; still present as of October 2016 were "old favorites" such as the program's faux sponsorship by Powdermilk Biscuits.

As of the opening month of the program, the planned replacement for the Keillor monologue was a slate of appearances from standup comics, for instance, the Irish comedian Maeve Higgins. New music from the host, and expanded music in general, had been noted as features of the new program. Andrew Leahy of Rolling Stone offers as perspective, that

Perhaps the most crucial ingredient in Thile's radio-show-revision recipe was his Song of the Week. Every broadcast featured a newly-penned composition, its lyrics and instrumental themes tailored to current events.

Thile indicated that the musical variety of the premiere program (see below) would continue, with listeners to expect "roots-rockers, folk singers, jazz musicians, soul revivalists and bluegrass bands all taking the stage."

=== Cancellation ===
In March 2020, because the escalation of the COVID-19 pandemic forced the shutdown of live music performances, Live from Here switched to a mixture of remotely produced broadcasts and reruns of episodes from 2019. By June, the pandemic had stressed parent company Minnesota Public Radio's finances. As it was unclear when—or even if—Live from Here could ever resume in-person performances, MPR diverted resources from the show toward its flagship program Marketplace. Live from Here was immediately cancelled following its June 13 remote broadcast, without affording the show a series finale.

== Cast and crew ==
In addition to Chris Thile, who contributed originally composed music and performances on his various instruments, the musical and acting cast and crew consisted of the following artists:

- Bodine Boling, creative director and announcer.
- Serena Brook, actress and voice-over artist.
- Madison Cunningham, singer and guitarist.
- Chris Eldridge, Punch Brothers guitarist.
- Mike Elizondo, musician and songwriter. Musical director of Live from Here from September 2018.
- Brittany Haas, fiddler.
- Alan Hampton, multi-instrumentalist
- Greg Hess, writer, performer, and improviser
- Sarah Jarosz, singer-songwriter, multi-instrumentalist.
- Paul Kowert, Punch Brothers bass player.
- Julian Lage, guitarist
- Holly Laurent, comic, improviser, writer, and director
- Gaby Moreno, vocalist
- Aoife O'Donovan, singer-songwriter
- Tom Papa, comedian, head writer.
- Ted Poor, drummer.
- Gabe Witcher, Punch Brothers fiddle player.
- Mike Yard, comedian

=== Former members ===
- Sue Scott, APHC veteran, actress and voice-over artist. Left in 2017.
- Fred Newman, APHC veteran, sound effects artist. Left in 2018.
- Rich Dworsky, composer, keyboardist. Musical director of A Prairie Home Companion and Live from Here until September 2018.
- Tim Russell, APHC veteran, voice actor and impressionist. Left in 2018.

== Broadcast information ==
Local public radio stations carried the weekly production of Live from Here with Chris Thile at one or more broadcast times, varying by station. The NPR Now channel on SiriusXM Satellite Radio carried the program on Saturdays at 5 p.m. and Sundays at 11 a.m., both Central Time (UTC−6). The audio of the program also streamed live online, at livefromhere.org on Saturdays from 5 to 7 p.m. Central, and video streams were likewise available when the program broadcasts from their home venue, The Fitzgerald Theater, or their "home-away-from-home", The Town Hall in New York City. Streaming audio from each show posts following the Saturday broadcast at livefromhere.org, as of March 2018 at noon, Central Time on Sunday.

Highlights from the show, including Chris Thile's "Song of the Week", are available via RSS, iHeartRadio, iTunes, Stitcher, and TuneIn.

== Comments on the changeover ==
In the announcement of the change in host for the program, American Public Media stated:

One of the most popular public radio programs will begin a new chapter this fall as musician Chris Thile takes over for Garrison Keillor as the new host of A Prairie Home Companion, bringing a fresh approach to an audience favorite. Beginning on October 15, 2016, Thile will host a 30-week season, including live broadcasts, produced shows and repeats on public radio stations nationwide.

Keillor, who had made various statements regarding retirement in the past, was described in June 2016 as being "fairly serious this time," and he is quoted as saying "Chris is my man, and I'm eager to stay home and read books." Elaborating further, Keillor wrote to Abe Streep of The New York Times Magazine, indicating that Thile's adventurous nature—alongside his high esteem for "the great bluegrass performer"—were reasons for his consideration as Keillor's replacement, which would be tested via a trial run of guest host appearances in January–February 2016; Keillor wrote,

I came to this decision myself, without talking to another soul about it ... I could've held meetings, commissioned studies, appointed a task force, and six months later the task force would've concluded that the show could not go on. Well, I say it can and it should. And I decided it should return to its roots as a musical variety show and grow from there.

Keillor went on to write about Thile, "He takes big chances ... He can be a chameleon, he can swim in every event, and for all his brilliance, nobody sounds better singing old American songs than he. Nobody."

Thile, in discussing the changeover with Minnesota Public Radio, indicated that he would continue to write new musical material, as he has in initial programs since his debut as host: "I would like to write something new every week ... I've written a new song for each show. I want to keep doing that. It's so much fun." In addition, he has highlighted comedy as an element for the new show, noting the success of appearances of comedian Maria Bamford in shows he had hosted early in 2016 which gave "five or six minutes of hilarity." With regard to story telling, he noted the success of an appearance by actor Ed Helms, indicating that the new APHC will "have that kind of thing going on." When asked about future on-air material from show originator and current executive producer Garrison Keillor, Thile replied, "He's such an amazing writer that if he comes up with an idea that would be good for the show ... I imagine we'll get a script here and there."

=== APM business strategy ===
While much media focus during the changeover was on the artistry and styles associated with Keillor and Thile, APHC and American Public Media (APM) are businesses as well; at its peak, the original APHC radio program had garnered in excess of four million weekly listeners, and Rivertown Trading Company, the purveyor of APHC-themed products, was sold in 1998 by Minnesota Public Radio for US$120 million. Sensitive to the potential loss of audience due to the change of the show's hosting—Thile said that he knew he would lose some listeners devoted to Keillor, stating at the time that "[the] goal is to lose one million ... and add two."—the program's distributor, American Public Media, indicated its intent to ease listeners completely away from experiencing the earlier Keillor format by "mix[ing] in" more than a dozen of the new APHC programs with Thile, alongside a set of reruns where Keillor is at the helm.

== Critical response ==
Writing for the Chicago Tribune, Steve Johnson noted that the new program "still rel[ies] heavily on an air of authenticity derived from its Minnesota locale, [but] now leans a little more toward music," and "away from storytelling." Johnson concluded that the program remains "an easy, graceful listen" featuring "a killer musical repertoire in the Americana tradition," and "humor ranging from corny to cutting."

Jon Bream of Minneapolis' Star Tribune complimented Thile's musical expertise, especially relative to the more amateur Keillor: "Unlike Keillor, Thile is a host who can actually sing duets with authority, not just aspiration" as well as suggesting that Thile's connections to popular music would benefit the production, such as to Jack White, who performed on the show.

Not all critics were as certain that the shift in the show's brand had been a good one. Erik Sherman, writing for Inc. This Morning, observed: "...brands are fragile and this one just hit the ground and shattered. ...the new name is Live From Here. A more anodyne and empty brand would be difficult to achieve. This is the sort of concoction that a satirist mocking such a production might adopt," and points out that the show's listenership was down to 2.6 million at the end of 2017.
