= Palace Theatre (Saint Paul, Minnesota) =

Coordinates: 44°56′50″N 93°05′48″W

- RKO Orpheum Theatre
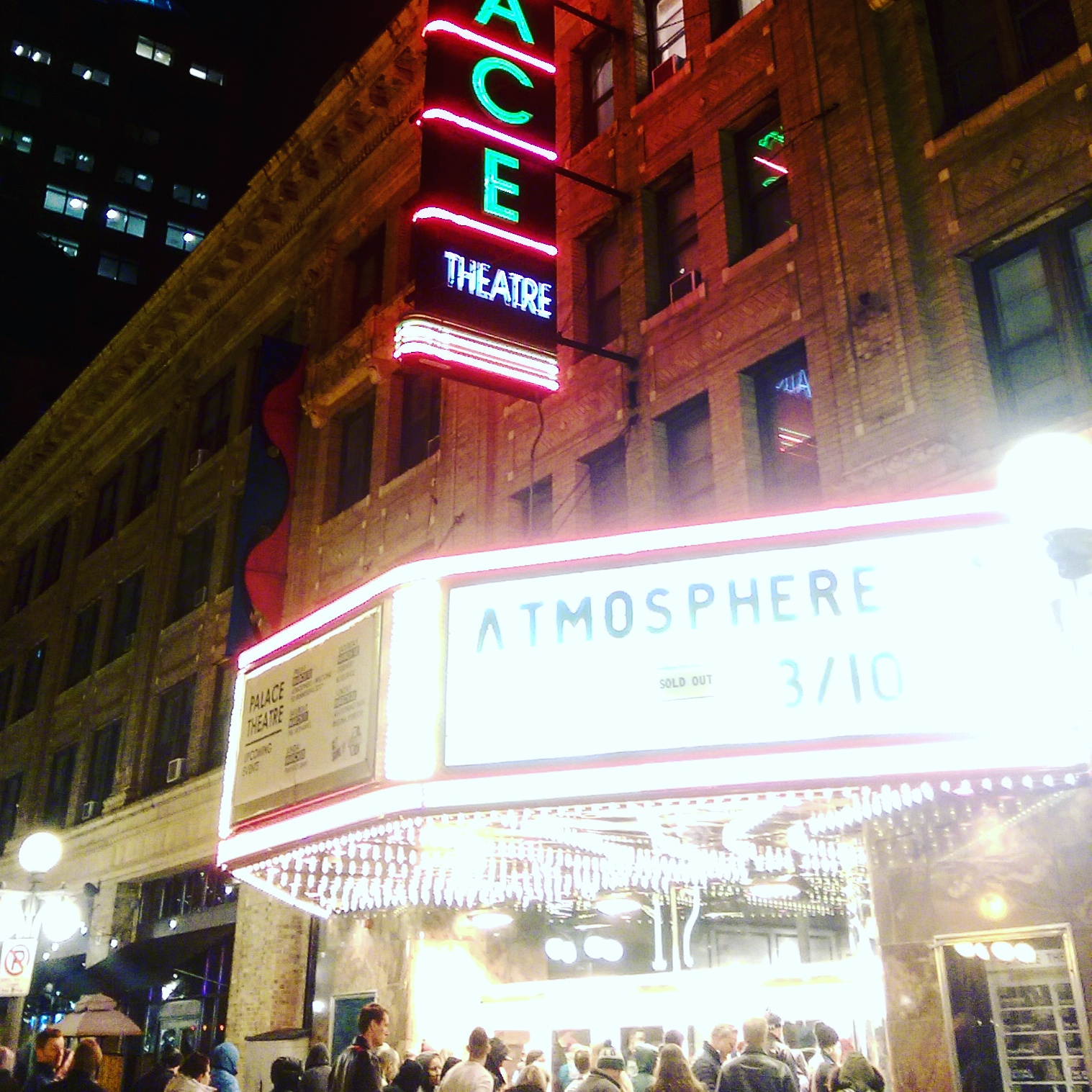
- Interactive map of Palace Theatre
- Address: 17 W 7th place Saint Paul, Minnesota; USA
- Operator: First Avenue, JAM Productions
- Capacity: 2,500

Construction
- Opened: 1916
- Renovated: 2016

The Palace Theatre is a historic theater in Saint Paul, Minnesota, United States. Dating from 1916, it was renovated in 2016 to become a live music venue.

== History ==
Called the New Palace upon opening on November 27, 1916, the theater was designed by Saint Paul architects Buechner & Orth in a Beaux-Arts style. It was built with the surrounding St. Francis Hotel, which also included shops, a ballroom, and the largest single-room billiard hall in the country. The basement was later home to the Granada Club, famous for its Spanish style and known as a gangster hangout.

The theater originally seated 2,300 people on the main floor and one balcony, and was part of the Finkelstein & Ruben circuit – a large regional chain that developed several other theaters in downtown Saint Paul, including the Princess (1909–1931) and the Capitol (1920–1965), as well as the State Theatre in Minneapolis. It made the transition from vaudeville to talkies, and was considered one of the city's two finest movie palaces – the other being the Paramount located directly across the street.

Over the years the Palace would be affiliated with different production companies, including the Orpheum, RKO, and Ted Mann. First-run feature films were shown from the 1920s until its closure in 1977 due to new competition from both multiplexes and television. In the following years the theater was used only for sporadic events, such as a few live broadcasts of A Prairie Home Companion while the nearby Fitzgerald Theater underwent renovations.

While dozens of theaters were built in the early 20th century in downtown Saint Paul, the Palace and the Fitzgerald are the only two that have survived.

== Renovation ==
The building was dark for three decades and on the verge of condemnation before the City of Saint Paul purchased it in 2015, embarking on a $15 million rehabilitation meant to prepare the venue for concerts. Working with local Saint Paul firm Oertel Architects, the scope of the project was not a full historical restoration; instead they stabilized the structure and preserved what remained, adding new plumbing and mechanical systems but leaving "rough edges" throughout. Seats on the main floor were removed to accommodate larger crowds in general admission and differentiate the Palace from other regional venues with similar capacities, including the Orpheum Theatre and Northrop Auditorium in Minneapolis. The balcony's 725 seats were refurbished.

The Palace had a public unveiling on December 16, 2016, around the time of its 100th anniversary. Bookings will be handled by First Avenue of Minneapolis and JAM Productions of Chicago. The first show at the renovated theater was March 10, 2017 by Atmosphere, with The Jayhawks and Phantogram also playing opening weekend.

== See also ==
- Fitzgerald Theater
- Ordway Center for the Performing Arts
- Roy Wilkins Auditorium
- Turf Club
