= A Prairie Home Companion (film) =

2006 film by Robert Altman

- Theatrical release poster
- Directed by: Robert Altman
- Screenplay by: Garrison Keillor
- Story by: Garrison Keillor; Ken LaZebnik
- Based on: A Prairie Home Companion by Garrison Keillor
- Produced by: David Levy; Tony Judge; Joshua Astrachan; Wren Arthur; Robert Altman
- Starring: Woody Harrelson; Tommy Lee Jones; Garrison Keillor; Kevin Kline; Lindsay Lohan; Virginia Madsen; John C. Reilly; Maya Rudolph; Meryl Streep; Lily Tomlin; Marylouise Burke; L. Q. Jones; Tim Russell; Sue Scott
- Cinematography: Edward Lachman
- Edited by: Jacob Craycroft
- Music by: Garrison Keillor
- Production companies: GreeneStreet Films; River Road Entertainment; Sandacastle 5
- Distributed by: New Line Cinema (North America; through Picturehouse); Capitol Films (international)
- Release dates: February 12, 2006 (Berlin); June 9, 2006 (United States)
- Running time: 106 minutes
- Country: United States
- Language: English
- Budget: $10 million
- Box office: $26 million

A Prairie Home Companion is a 2006 American musical comedy film directed by Robert Altman in his final film. It is a fictional representation of behind-the-scenes activities at the long-running public radio show of the same name. The film received mostly positive reviews and was a moderate box-office success on a small budget. The film features an ensemble cast including Woody Harrelson, Tommy Lee Jones, Garrison Keillor, Kevin Kline, Lindsay Lohan, Virginia Madsen, John C. Reilly, Maya Rudolph, Meryl Streep, and Lily Tomlin.

== Plot ==
In Saint Paul, Minnesota, the long-running live radio variety show A Prairie Home Companion prepares for what the listening audience does not know is its final broadcast. The radio station's new parent company has scheduled the show's home, the storied Fitzgerald Theater, for demolition, and dispatched "the Axeman" to judge whether to save the show.

In between musical acts, and under the watchful eye of PI Guy Noir (Kevin Kline), the show's denizens mingle and reminisce, including: the singing Johnson Girls, Yolanda (Meryl Streep), her sister Rhonda (Lily Tomlin), and daughter Lola (Lindsay Lohan); cowboy duo Dusty (Woody Harrelson) and Lefty (John C. Reilly); pregnant PA Molly (Maya Rudolph); the Stage Manager, Makeup Lady, and Sound Effects Man (real life Radio Acting Co. members Tim Russell, Sue Scott, and Tom Keith); and the show's creator and host, Garrison Keillor (often called "GK").

The show is visited by an otherworldly "Dangerous Woman" (Virginia Madsen) in a white trench coat revealed to be Lois Peterson, a listener who died in a car accident while listening to a past broadcast, now returned as the angel Asphodel; she lends comfort to the cast and crew for the show's ending and the death of the elderly Chuck Akers (L. Q. Jones) backstage.

The Axeman (Tommy Lee Jones) arrives and swiftly declares the show too old-fashioned to keep on the air. Asphodel escorts him from the theater to an untimely demise, but the show is still canceled.

Years later, the former cast reunites at Mickey's Diner with plans for a farewell tour. Their lively conversation pauses as Asphodel enters the diner.

== Cast ==
- Garrison Keillor as Himself
- Kevin Kline as Guy Noir
- Meryl Streep as Yolanda Johnson
- Lily Tomlin as Rhonda Johnson
- Lindsay Lohan as Lola Johnson
- Woody Harrelson as Dusty
- John C. Reilly as Lefty
- Tommy Lee Jones as the Axeman
- Virginia Madsen as the Dangerous Woman
- Maya Rudolph as Molly
- Marylouise Burke as Lunchlady
- L. Q. Jones as Chuck Akers
- Tim Russell as the Stage Manager
- Tom Keith as the Sound Effects Man
- Sue Scott as the Makeup Lady
- Robin and Linda Williams as themselves
- Jearlyn Steele as herself
- Bruce Bohne as Actor
- Matthew Feeney as Actor
- Jim Westcott as Actor
- Punnavith Koy as Actor

== Production notes ==
To receive insurance for the shoot, Robert Altman had to hire Paul Thomas Anderson as a standby director to observe filming at all times and be prepared to take over for Altman in case of his incapacity. Virginia Madsen said: "Paul was very much directing with Bob. Paul was an admirer of Altman and Bob really loved Paul. The truth is they would not insure Bob as director because he was older and he was going through chemotherapy, which was a big secret at the time, and certainly it never affected his ability to work. But they wanted to make sure, as he would say in his words, 'In case I kick the bucket I've got a pinch hitter.' [...] So on the back of his chair it said 'director' and on the back of Paul’s chair it said 'pinch hitter.' Sometimes Paul was directing other cameras because one time we had four or five cameras going. Sometimes they would direct in tandem. But Bob was certainly our fearless leader in every way and Paul was working with him."

Using the working title The Last Show, principal photography for the film began on June 29, 2005, at the Fitzgerald Theater in St. Paul, Minnesota (the radio show's usual venue), and ended on July 28, 2005.

== Reception ==
=== Box office ===
The film grossed $20,338,609 domestically (in a limited release) and $25,978,442 worldwide.

=== Critical response ===
A Prairie Home Companion opened the 2006 South by Southwest film festival on March 10, then premiered on May 3, 2006, at the Fitzgerald Theater, which had projection and sound equipment brought in for the purpose. The film's stars arrived in ten horse-drawn carriages. Brian Williams of NBC Nightly News anchored his newscast from neighboring Minneapolis, Minnesota, that night so that he would be able to attend.

Critics' general reaction to the film was favorable. On review aggregator Rotten Tomatoes, the film holds an approval rating of 81% based on 197 reviews, with an average rating of 7.12/10. The website's critics consensus reads: "The final film by the great Robert Altman, A Prairie Home Companion, the big screen adaptation of Garrison Keillor's radio broadcast showcases plenty of the director's strengths: it's got a gigantic cast and plenty of quirky acting and dialogue." Roger Ebert awarded the film four out of four stars, saying, "What a lovely film this is, so gentle and whimsical, so simple and profound", and later added the film to his "Great Movies" list.

Michael Medved (himself a radio host) gave the film one and a half stars out of four, saying, "The entertainment value stands somewhere between thin and nonexistent" and "[it may be] the worst movie ever made that pooled the talents of four (count ‘em – four!) Oscar winners".

Desson Thomson from The Washington Post fell in between, writing in a review headlined "Honey, You Could Ask for More" (a reference to the radio show's theme song) that while the movie had its strengths, it was weaker than it should have been.

=== Accolades ===
Streep won the Best Supporting Actress Award from the National Society of Film Critics for her role; Altman was also posthumously nominated for an Independent Spirit Award for Best Director.

== Soundtrack ==
A Prairie Home Companion

Soundtrack album by Various artists
- Released: May 23, 2006
- Recorded: Fitzgerald Theater in St. Paul, Minnesota
- Genre: Country
- Length: 64:24
- Label: New Line

Professional ratings
Review scores
Source	Rating
AllMusic	4/5 stars

A Prairie Home Companion is the soundtrack to the 2006 film A Prairie Home Companion. It was released on May 23, 2006, via New Line Records.

=== Track listing ===
No.	Title	Writer(s)	Artist(s)	Length
1.	"Tishomingo Blues"	Garrison Keillor, Spencer Williams	Garrison Keillor	1:58
2.	"Gold Watch and Chain"	A. P. Carter	Garrison Keillor and Meryl Streep	2:39
3.	"Mudslide"	Pat Donohue	The Guys All-Star Shoe Band	3:06
4.	"Let Your Light Shine on Me"	Blind Willie Johnson	Garrison Keillor, Robin and Linda Williams and Prudence Johnson	2:50
5.	"Coffee Jingle"	Keillor, Kate MacKenzie	Garrison Keillor and Jearlyn Steele	0:52
6.	"Summit Avenue Rag"	Richard Dworsky	The Guys All-Star Shoe Band	2:44
7.	"Guy's Shoes"	Donohue	The Guys All-Star Shoe Band	0:42
8.	"Whoop-I-Ti-Yi-Yo"	Keillor, Traditional	Woody Harrelson and John C. Reilly	2:32
9.	"Coming Down from Red Lodge"	Peter Ostroushko	The Guys All-Star Shoe Band	1:55
10.	"You Have Been a Friend to Me"	Carter	L. Q. Jones	2:27
11.	"Old Plank Road"	Robin and Linda Williams	Robin and Linda Williams	2:50
12.	"My Minnesota Home"	Stephen Foster, Keillor	Meryl Streep and Lily Tomlin	3:38
13.	"A Bunch of Guys"	Dworsky	The Guys All-Star Shoe Band	2:01
14.	"Slow Days of Summer"	Keillor	Garrison Keillor	3:02
15.	"Frankie and Johnny"	Keillor, Traditional	Lindsay Lohan	2:05
16.	"Waitin' for You"	Donohue	The Guys All-Star Shoe Band	2:41
17.	"Jens Jensen's Herring"	Keillor, Traditional	The Guys All-Star Shoe Band	0:47
18.	"Red River Valley"	Traditional	Garrison Keillor and Jearlyn Steele	3:23
19.	"Strappin' the Strings"	Andy Stein	The Guys All-Star Shoe Band	2:27
20.	"Goodbye to My Mama"	Keillor	Meryl Streep and Lily Tomlin	3:28
21.	"Bad Jokes"	Keillor	Woody Harrelson and John C. Reilly	4:42
22.	"The Day Is Short"	Dworsky, Keillor	Jearlyn Steele	3:13
23.	"Atlanta Twilight"	Dworsky	The Guys All-Star Shoe Band	2:36
24.	"Red River Valley"/"In the Sweet By-and-By"	Traditional	Cast Ensemble	3:20
25.	"Guy Noir"	Keillor	The Guys All-Star Shoe Band	2:26

=== Chart performance ===
Chart (2006)	Peak position
US Billboard 200	160
US Billboard Top Country Albums	35
US Billboard Top Independent Albums	10
US Billboard Top Soundtracks	7

== Home media ==
The DVD was released on October 10, 2006. Special features included deleted scenes, a behind-the-scenes documentary, and commentary by Altman and Kline. The manufacture-on-demand Blu-ray was released by Warner Archive Collection on September 24, 2024.

== See also ==
- List of films about angels
