= The Morning Show =

The Morning Show may refer to:

== Australia ==
- The Morning Show (TV program), an Australian talk show hosted by Larry Emdur and Kylie Gillies that airs on the Seven Network
- The Morning Show (1992 TV program), the original title for the 1992–2005 Australian morning television variety program, Good Morning Australia, that aired on Network Ten

== Canada ==
- The Morning Show (Canadian TV program), a morning show on Global Toronto

== Ireland ==
- The Morning Show with Sybil & Martin, an Irish television show produced by TV3

== Philippines ==
- The Morning Show, a morning show formerly broadcast by the National Broadcasting Network and its successor, People's Television Network from 2010 to 2013 (no relation to below)
- The Morning Show, a regional morning show broadcast by ABS-CBN Bacolod (TV-4) (no relation to above)

== United States ==
- The Morning Show, the original title of the talk show Live
- The Morning Show (American TV series), an Apple TV+ drama series starring Reese Witherspoon, Jennifer Aniston, and Steve Carell
- The Morning Show with Mike and Juliet, a television morning talk show produced by Fox
- The Morning Show (Minnesota Public Radio), an American morning drive-time radio program
- The DVE Morning Show, an American morning drive-time radio program broadcast on WDVE in Pittsburgh, Pennsylvania
- The Early Show, a morning news talk show broadcast by CBS from 1999 to 2012

== See also ==
- Breakfast television
- Morning zoo
