= Dale Connelly =

Radio presenter (born 1955)

- Born: October 4, 1955 (age 70)
- Occupation: Radio personality
- Known for: The Morning Show on Minnesota Public Radio

Dale Connelly (born 4 October 1955) was co-host (with Tom Keith, aka Jim Ed Poole) of The Morning Show on Minnesota Public Radio. The program was first carried on KSJN at frequency 91.1 (now KNOW-FM, later on KSJN at 99.5 and finally on KCMP 89.3 "The Current"; all in the Twin Cities and live on MPR's classical music network in outstate Minnesota. Connelly took over for Garrison Keillor, who was the original host along with Tom Keith. The show aired for more than 30 years. On October 15, 2008, Keith announced his intention to retire on December 11. The Morning Show was discontinued after a final live performance at the Fitzgerald Theater in St. Paul that morning. After the demise of the Morning Show, Connelly began hosting, directing, and producing a show in a similar genre on an Internet broadcast and HD Radio called "Radio Heartland." He also hosted Saturday evening broadcasts of recorded performances on the Minnesota News service of Minnesota Public Radio. Those programs were canceled by MPR on June 4, 2010, and Connelly was laid off as of June 30, 2010.

He authored many scripts for "advertisements", skits, and soap operas performed on The Morning Show. Among his notable creations were "The Sherpa from Intimida", "A Mighty Big Car", and Genway, "the supermarket for genetically engineered foods." Genway produced things like the Bullwinkle Salmon ("part salmon, part moose") and Chameleon Pears.

Other Connelly creations included the "Bowserbed" vibrating sleeping mattress for dogs, "Yes, I Am Wireless," Found Snacks ("makers of low-fat neutrinos. There's nothing to them! No fat, no cholesterol, no calories—no substance and no mass!"), and reporters Brick Walters, Bud Buck, and The Morning Show's "living and loving correspondent," B. Marty Barry. Connelly also created a regular cast of characters, including Nephew Thomas (the radio daredevil), Captain Billy and the crew of the Muskellunge and Dr. Harley Clumsy (the animal identifier).

In 1999 and 2000, Connelly wrote Dale Connelly Reporting, a satirical news show for Minnesota Public Radio that included features like "Antiques Road Show," "Shouting Down School," and features on "Police and Courtroom Portrait Artists", "Low-Speed Internet Access," and "Lutheran Olympics".

Since leaving MPR, Connelly has been writing a blog, Trail Baboon, on which he has continued creating characters and engaging readers with his observations. In June 2011, Connelly became news director for Minneapolis community radio station KFAI, where he had been a part-time producer. Press Release He served as primary Producer for Brenda Bell Brown during her time as a morning drive newscaster and presenter of her weekly show “Play For Me.”
