= A Prairie Home Album =

Compilation album by A Prairie Home Companion
- Genre: Spoken Word; Radio
- Length: 43:56
- Label: Minnesota Educational Radio
- Producer: Evelyn Wills Duvalier, Larry P. Gagne

A Prairie Home Album is an album from the Prairie Home Companion radio show released in 1972. It features items written for the early days of the program, when it was a morning show broadcast from KSJN in St. Paul, MN.

== Track listing ==
Side One

1. Six A.M. [4:55]
2. O Father Dear Why (Gagne) [2:55]
3. That Sound Friends [3:45]
4. Old Shep (Foley) [3:20]
5. When I Was a Boy [3:33]
6. Mom Angel (Keillor/Raygor) [2:45]

Side Two

1. Breakfast Hymn (Will L. Thompson, 1879) [2:58]
2. Joy to the World & Time for a Word [3:00]
3. My Mailbox Is Empty (Gagne) [3:50]
4. The Timber Wolf (Gagne/Hinkley) [4:55]
5. Hobo's Meditation (Rodgers) [2:40]
6. On the Road (Keillor) [5:20]

== Personnel ==
- Garrison Keillor: Vocal
- Bill Hinkley: guitar and vocal harmony and fiddle ("Joy to the World")
- Judy Larson: guitar ("O Father Dear Why" and " Joy to the World") and vocal harmony
- Stephen Gammell: guitar and vcal ("Old Shep" and "Hobo's Meditation")
- Jon Pankake: fiddle ("The Timber Wolf")
- Tom Ardnt, Larry P. Gagne, Slim Graves: vocal harmony ("Mom Angel")

== Production ==
- "That Sound Friends" recorded at Walker Art Center, Minneapolis
- "Old Shep", "Hobo's Meditation" and "Time for a Word" recorded at St. Paul Arts & Science Center
- "Breakfast Hymn" recorded at Henry Schoolcraft State Park on the Upper Mississippi River
- All others recorded at the studios of KSJN
- Album cover: Barbara and Patrick Redmond
- Technical direction by David Carlton Felland
- Engineering assistance from D. Michael Shields, Jerry Vanek, and David Rassmussen.
