= Tim Russell =

American voice actor

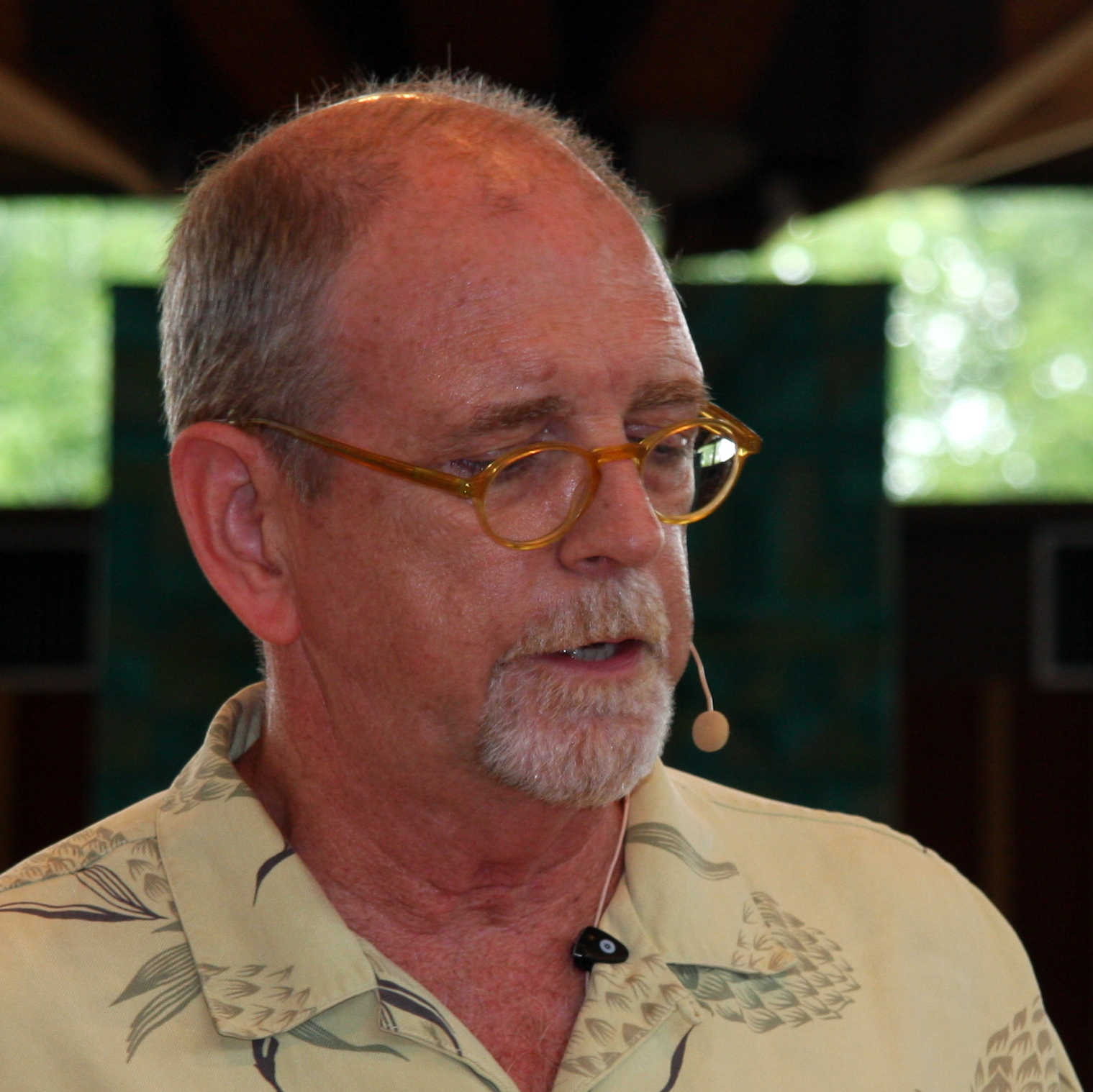
- Born: September 1947 (age 78–79)
- Education: University of Notre Dame
- Occupations: Radio host, voice actor
- Known for: A Prairie Home Companion
- Website: russellreviews.com

Tim Russell (born 1947) is an American radio announcer and voice actor (AFTRA/SAG) in Minneapolis – Saint Paul. He is most widely known as one of the actors on the long-running radio show, A Prairie Home Companion, and continued in that role on the show, re-titled, Live From Here with Chris Thile until September 2018. As a voice-over talent and announcer, Russell also appears in radio and television commercials.

== Education and radio career ==
Russell graduated cum laude from the University of Notre Dame and briefly attended law school at the University of Minnesota.

Russell began his radio career at WDBQ-AM in Dubuque, Iowa. He began work at WCCO-FM when it went on the air in 1973. While working there he began developing character voices and doing commercials. Between 1983 and 1993, he worked at WCCO-AM. After leaving WCCO, he worked for country station KJJO-FM and "easy listening" station KLBB. He returned to WCCO-AM in 1997 as a host and entertainment editor until his retirement from the station in 2010.

Russell was inducted into The Minnesota Broadcasters Hall of Fame in 2023

== A Prairie Home Companion ==
In 1994, Russell began performing on the public radio show, A Prairie Home Companion. As a radio comedy actor, he is the voice behind Dusty from "Lives of the Cowboys", Bill Clinton and many other characters in sketches that also utilized his many celebrity and politician impressions.

Russell played "Al, the Stage Manager" in A Prairie Home Companion (2006), the movie based on a screenplay by Garrison Keillor and filmed by Robert Altman at the Fitzgerald Theater in St. Paul, Minnesota during the summer of 2005.

== Live From Here ==
In 2017, A Prairie Home Companion was given a new name, Live From Here with Chris Thile, to reflect the change in hosts. Russell continued as the announcer and one of the actors on the show until September 2018.

== Filmography ==
In addition to his role in the film version of A Prairie Home Companion, Russell had small parts in two films set in Minnesota, Little Big League (1994) and the Coen Brothers' A Serious Man (2009), and I Am Not a Serial Killer (2016).

== Recordings ==
In addition to dozens of CD’s featuring his characters on “A Prairie Home Companion”, Russell has his own CD, Tim Russell: Man of a Thousand Voices (Highbridge Audio).
