= The Morning Show (Minnesota Public Radio) =

Radio program

The Morning Show, initially called The Morning Program and then for a time A Prairie Home Entertainment and A Prairie Home Morning Show, was a weekday morning drive-time radio program produced in St. Paul, Minnesota and broadcast on Minnesota Public Radio's KCMP and other stations of the MPR network.

The Morning Program first aired in 1969 on Minnesota Educational Radio with host Garrison Keillor and engineer/sidekick Tom Keith, known on the air as Jim Ed Poole. Keillor eventually began to parody MPR's then-classical playlist by playing pop music. The initial deviation from the classical playlist was the Beach Boys' "Help Me, Rhonda." In 1971, it adopted the name A Prairie Home Morning Show.

Keillor's good-natured sense of humor is credited with allowing him to expand the playlist. Efforts by classical music purists to remove The Morning Program from the MPR network continued until the mid-1980s, however.

The program was best known for offering an eclectic selection of recorded music, ersatz "commercials" for fantastic products, and interviews with imaginary characters. The program also eventually featured live in-studio performances by local and nationally known musicians.

Keillor's success with his new live Saturday radio program A Prairie Home Companion, and a desire to spend more time with his writing career, led him to leave The Morning Program in 1983, whereupon Dale Connelly joined Jim Ed Poole as co-host. The program was eventually renamed The Morning Show.

On October 15, 2008, Keith announced his intention to retire on December 11. The Morning Show was discontinued after a final live performance at the Fitzgerald Theater in St. Paul that morning.

On December 12, Connelly began producing an online and HD radio service for MPR centered on The Morning Show's playlist and called "Radio Heartland."
