= Tishomingo Blues =

Song by Spencer Williams

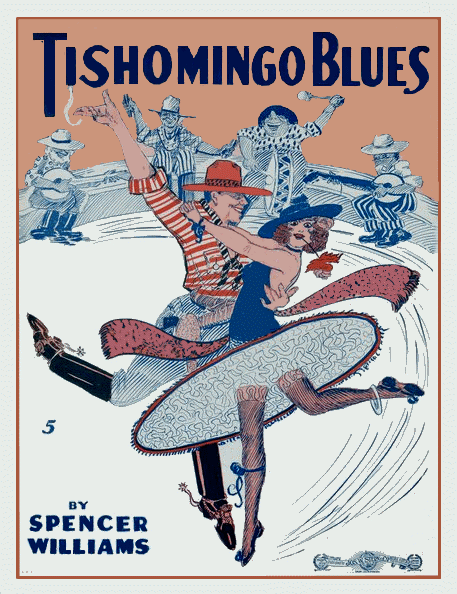
- Sheet music, 1917

Song
- Published: 1917
- Songwriter(s): Spencer Williams

"Tishomingo Blues" is a song by Spencer Williams. The tune was first published in 1917. The title refers to Tishomingo, Mississippi.

The song was first recorded in 1918 by Eddie Nelson on Emerson Records #913. It became a jazz standard, and continues to be performed and recorded into the 21st century. The song has been adapted with different lyrics, written by Garrison Keillor, as the theme song of A Prairie Home Companion.

== Lyrics ==
First verse

Oh Mississippi, oh Mississippi
My heart cries out for you in sadness
I want to be where the wintry winds don't blow
Down where the southern moon swings low
That's where I want to go

Chorus

I'm goin' to Tishomingo, because I'm sad today
I wish to linger way down old Dixie way
Oh, my weary heart cries out in pain
Oh, how I wish that I was back again
With a race, in a place
Where they make you welcome all the time
Way down in Mississippi, among the cypress trees
They get you dippy, with their strange melodies
To resist temptation, I just can't refuse
In Tishomingo I wish to linger
Where they play the weary blues

Second verse

Tonight I'm prayin', tonight I'm sayin'
Oh Lord please take the train that takes me
To Tishomingo, 'way down old Dixie way
Where southern folks are always gay
That's why you hear me say
I'm goin' to Tishomingo

Repeat Chorus

== Recordings ==
- Eddie Nelson, Emerson Records #913, https://www.youtube.com/watch?v=ZVg13XeTPH8, 1918
- Duke Ellington and his Cotton Club Orchestra, 1928
- Bunk Johnson and his New Orleans Band, 1945
- Big Chief Jazzband, recorded in Oslo, Norway on May 10, 1953 and released on the 78 rpm record His Master's Voice A.L. 3307
- Sweet Emma Barret and her New Orleans Boys, 1961, with Percy Humphrey (trumpet); Willie Humphrey, clarinet; Jim Robinson, trombone; Emma Barrett, piano; Emanual Sayles, guitar; McNeal Breaux, bass; Josiah Frazier, drums
