= Sue Scott (actress) =

American actress

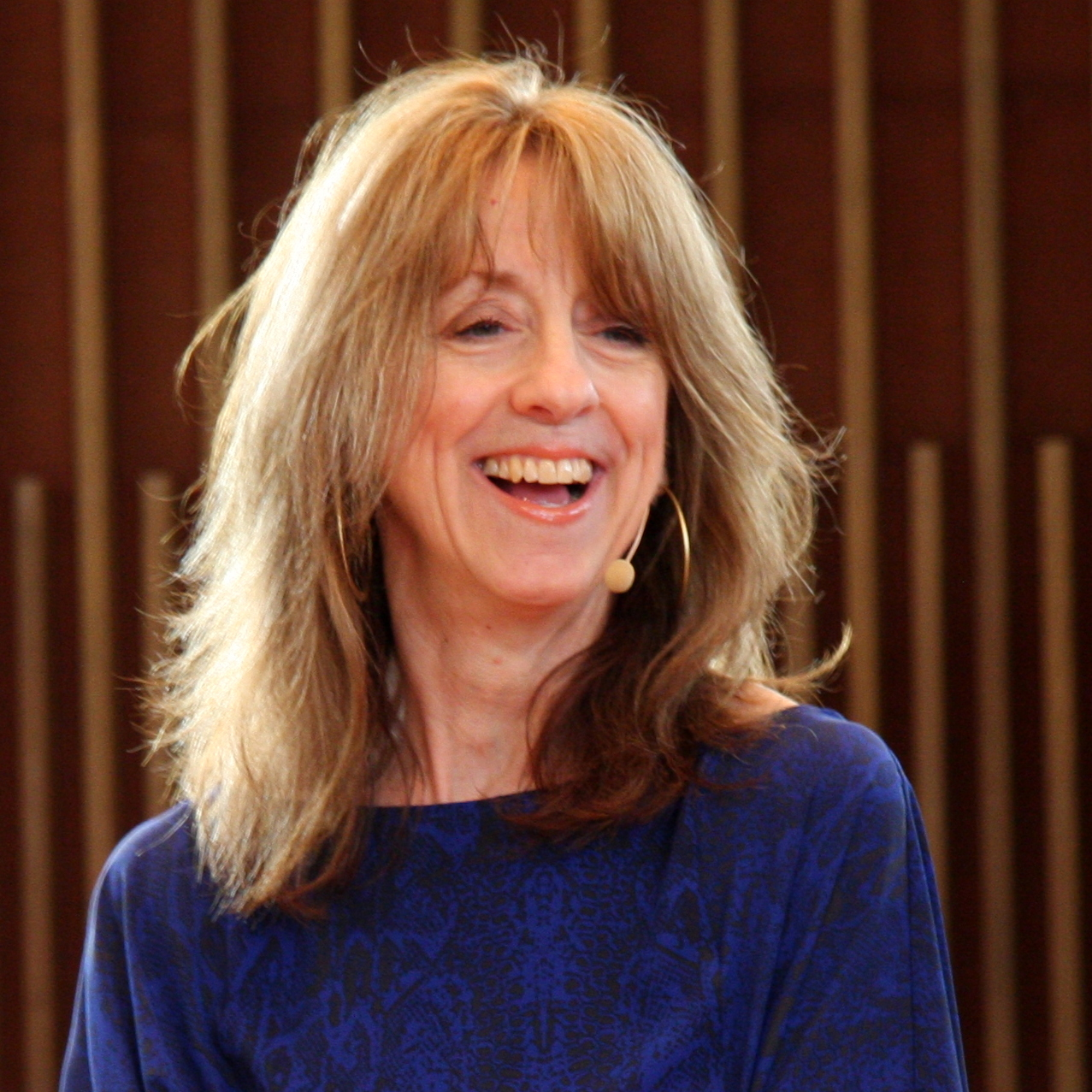
- Sue Scott in 2014
- Born: 1957
- Education: University of Arizona; The Second City
- Occupation: Actress

Sue Scott is an American actress and character voice actor (AFTRA/SAG/AEA) in Minneapolis and St. Paul, Minnesota. She is best known for her work as a radio comedy actor on Garrison Keillor's public radio show, A Prairie Home Companion, and for her work as a voice-over talent in radio and television commercials. She has also appeared in films and television.

She has appeared in productions at the History Theatre, Nautilus Music-Theater, Mixed Blood Theatre, The Minnesota Festival Theater, Illusion Theater, and Dudley Riggs' Brave New Workshop.

== Career ==
While a theater major at the University of Arizona, Scott performed in summer stock in Garrison, Iowa. Later she studied at The Second City in Chicago and acted at the Brave New Workshop in Minneapolis. That led to opportunities in local theater and advertising.

Scott joined the cast of A Prairie Home Companion in 1992. Additionally, she played "Donna, the Makeup Lady" in the movie A Prairie Home Companion (released June 9, 2006), based on a screenplay by Keillor and filmed by Robert Altman at the Fitzgerald Theater in Saint Paul, Minnesota during the summer of 2005.

In 2017, Scott was honored as the Alumna of the Year for the College of Fine Arts at the University of Arizona

Since 2019 Scott has been producing a Podcast Island of Discarded Women.

== Discography ==
- Sue Scott: Seriously Silly (A Prairie Home Companion) (2013), written by Garrison Keillor and featuring Garrison Keillor and Tom Keith
