= Fitzgerald Theater =

Theater in Saint Paul, Minnesota, US

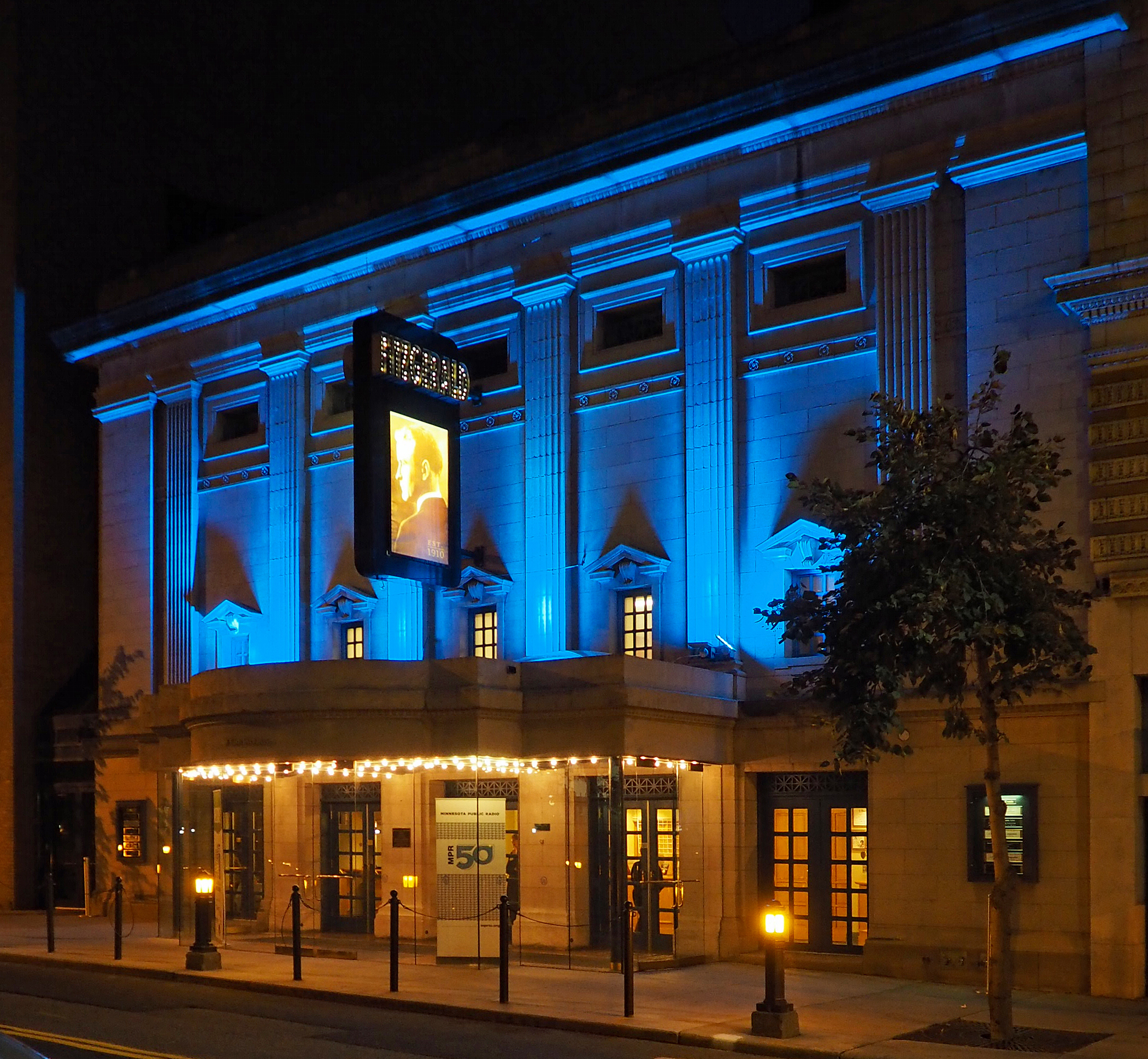
- The Fitzgerald Theater illuminated at night
- Interactive map of Fitzgerald Theater
- Address: 10 East Exchange Street; Saint Paul, Minnesota; United States
- Coordinates: 44.94889°N 93.09722°W
- Owner: First Avenue
- Capacity: 1,058
- Type: Provincial

Construction
- Opened: 1910
- Architect: Marshall and Fox

Website
- www.thefitzgeraldtheatre.com
- Sam S. Shubert Theater and Shubert Building
- U.S. National Register of Historic Places
- Location within Minnesota Location within the United States
- Location: 10 East Exchange Street and 488-494 Wabasha Street North
- Coordinates: 44°56′56″N 93°5′50″W
- NRHP reference No.: 84004140
- Added to NRHP: August 20, 1984

The Fitzgerald Theater is the oldest active theatre in Saint Paul, Minnesota, and the home of American Public Media's Live from Here (formerly A Prairie Home Companion). It was one of many theaters built by the Shubert Theatre Corporation, and was initially named the Sam S. Shubert Theater. It was designed by the noted Chicago architectural firm of Marshall and Fox, architects of several theaters for the Shuberts. In 1933, it became a movie outlet known as the World Theater. The space was purchased by Minnesota Public Radio in 1980, restored with a stage in 1986 as a site for Prairie Home, and renamed in 1994 after St. Paul native F. Scott Fitzgerald.

On November 4, 2002, the theater was the site of a memorable election-eve debate between United States Senate candidates Norm Coleman (previously mayor of St. Paul) and Walter Mondale (formerly a U.S. Vice President) and moderated by Gary Eichten of MPR and Paul Magers of local television station KARE. Tension was heightened at the time because Mondale stepped in as a candidate at the last minute after the death of Paul Wellstone, who had been running for re-election.

In 2005, the theater was used for filming the Prairie Home Companion movie directed by Robert Altman. While a certain level of realism is added by using the normal venue for the show, the regular equipment was eschewed in favor of sets designed for the movie. Because the theater is a small building, other theaters in the region were also scouted prior to filming, just in case the Fitzgerald was not big enough, but eventually it was determined to be adequate for the film's needs.

In March 2019 Twin Cities venue operator, First Avenue, purchased The Fitzgerald Theater from MPR.

The theater has a theatre organ, made by Wurlitzer.

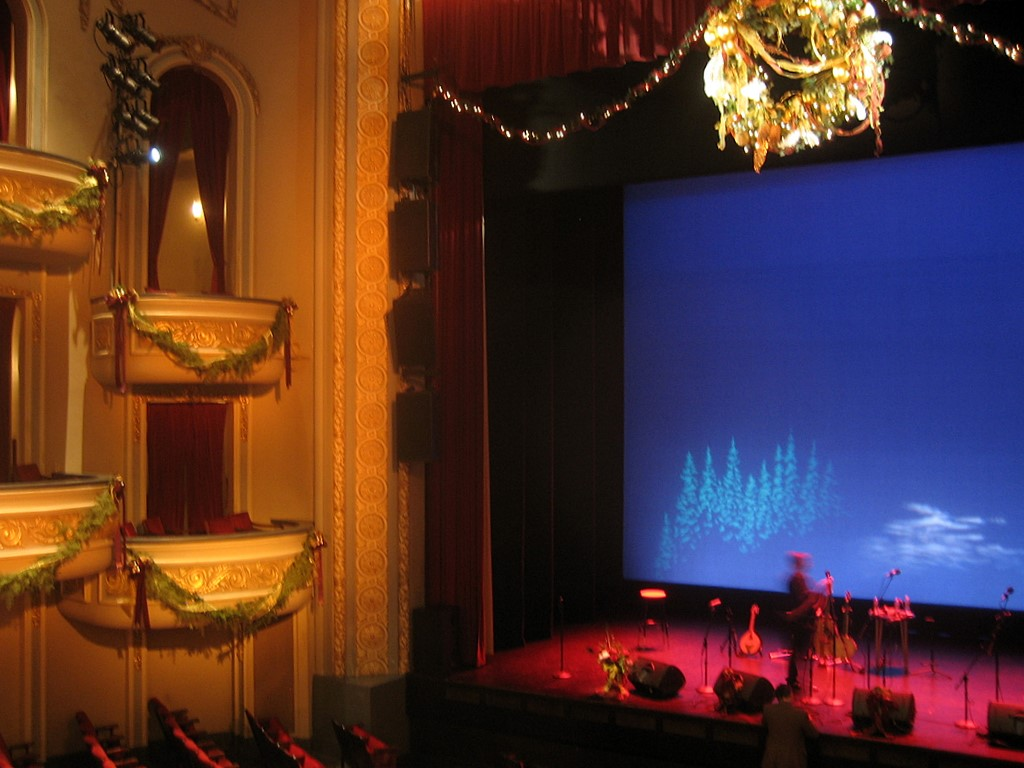
Interior of Minnesota Public Radio's Fitzgerald Theater

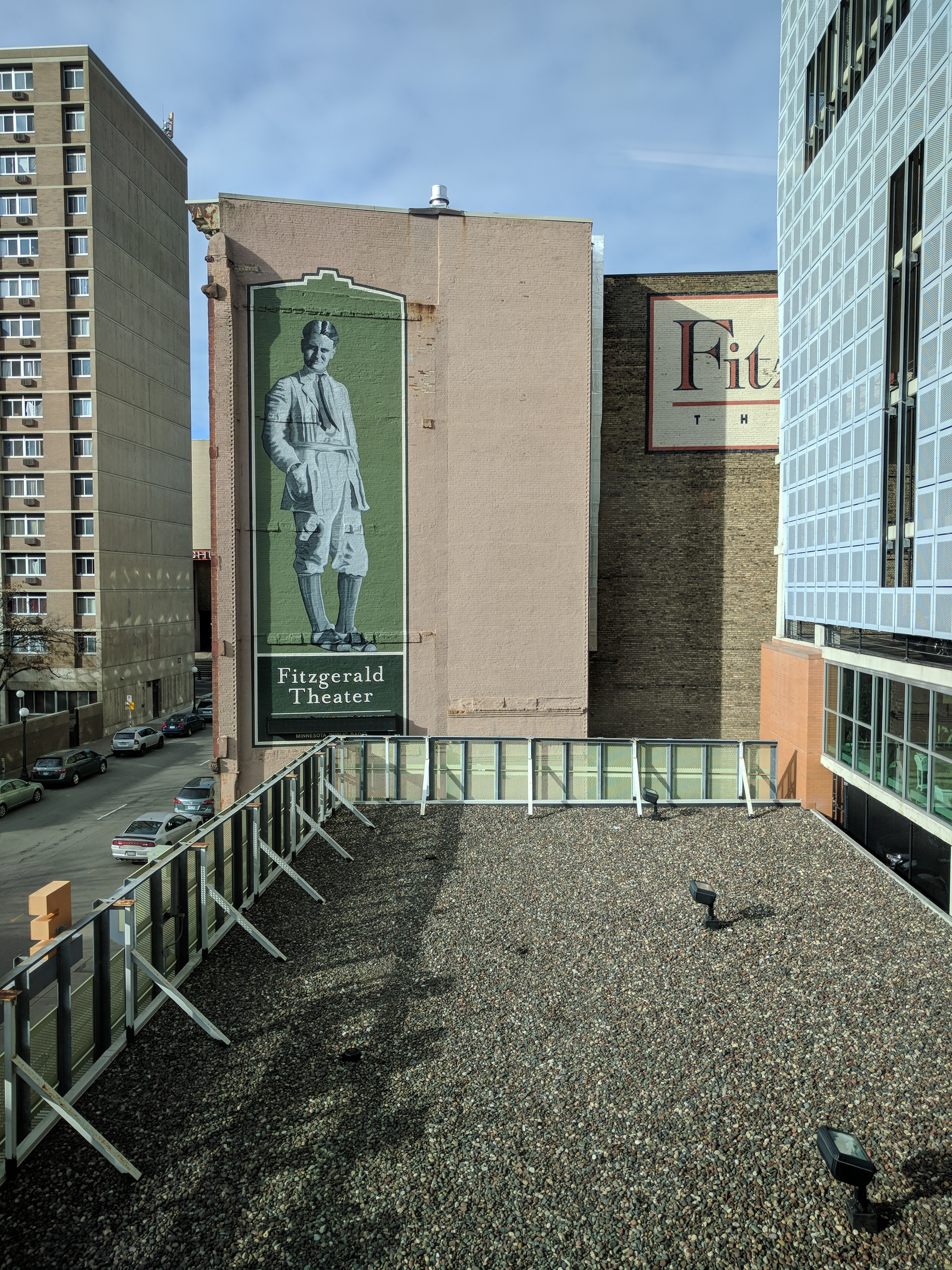
Mural on building exterior depicting F. Scott Fitzgerald
