= Tom Keith =

American radio personality (1946-2011)

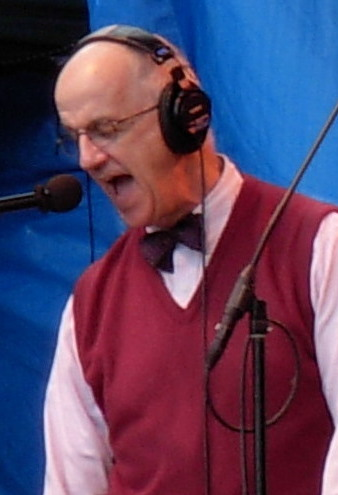
- Keith during a live performance of A Prairie Home Companion in 2007
- Born: Thomas Alan Keith; December 21, 1946; St. Paul, Minnesota, U.S.
- Died: October 30, 2011 (aged 64); Woodbury, Minnesota, U.S.
- Resting place: Acacia Park Cemetery, Mendota Heights, Minnesota, U.S.
- Education: University of Minnesota
- Occupation: radio personality
- Years active: 1973–2011
- Employer: Minnesota Public Radio
- Known for: Sound effects
- Spouse: Ri Wei Liu-Keith

Thomas Alan Keith (December 21, 1946 – October 30, 2011) was an American radio sound effects artist and performer best known for his work on the nationally syndicated public radio program A Prairie Home Companion. Over a career of more than three decades, Keith created live sound effects and occasional character voices for the show, contributing to its distinctive audio style and storytelling.

In addition to his work with A Prairie Home Companion, Keith performed and produced radio and audio projects in the Twin Cities area and collaborated with other public radio productions. He was widely regarded within public radio for his technical skill and creative use of sound effects.

== Death ==
Keith died October 30, 2011, at his home due to a heart attack.

In 2012, A Prairie Home Companion released Tom Keith - Sound Effects Man, a CD collecting eleven of his featured performances from the live radio show.
