= Music of Minnesota =

The music of Minnesota began with the native rhythms and songs of Indigenous peoples, the first inhabitants of the lands which later became the U.S. state of Minnesota. Métis fur-trading voyageurs introduced the chansons of their French ancestors in the late eighteenth century. As the territory was opened up to white settlement in the 19th century, each group of immigrants brought with them the folk music of their European homelands. Celtic, German, Scandinavian, and Central and Eastern European song and dance remain part of the vernacular music of the state today.

Ethnic music has influenced and developed into modern folk music, and American musical genres such as gospel music, blues and jazz also are part of the state's musical fabric. Musicians, such as the Andrews Sisters and Bob Dylan, often started in Minnesota but left the state for the cultural capitals of the east and west coasts, but in recent years the development of an active music industry in Minneapolis has encouraged local talent to produce and record at home. The city's most influential contributions to American popular music happened in the 1980s, when the city's music scene "expanded the state's cultural identity" and launched the careers of acclaimed performers like the multi-platinum pop singer Prince. The Replacements and Hüsker Dü set off the national alternative rock boom of the 1990s. In the 1990s and 2000s, the Twin Cities played a role in the national hip hop scene with artists such as Atmosphere and Brother Ali.

The Minneapolis Symphony Orchestra was founded in the early 1900s, and by the 1930s it had attained international stature in performance and recording. Since renamed the Minnesota Orchestra, it regained much of its former renown in the first decade of the 21st century. Classical music aficianados also enjoy and support the Saint Paul Chamber Orchestra, the only full-time chamber orchestra in the nation. Choral groups and community ensembles are located in many communities. The state's educational system provides comprehensive programs in music education. The nation's largest public radio network provides classical and other music programming regionally and to the nation, and independent public stations program a variety of college, folk, and new music.

== History ==
The music of Minnesota has its roots with the music of Indigenous peoples of the area. Traditional arrangements are generally based around vocal, percussive and dance music; Dakota folk songs can be celebratory, martial or ceremonial. Early European settlers (French and Métis voyageurs) brought French chansons, which they sang while traveling along their fur trade routes. These songs were described by one visitor as "light, airy & graceful", and were often adapted to the rhythm of their paddles while canoeing. Later European settlers also brought with them traditional folk and classical music, especially choral and Christian-themed music, opera, and varieties of ethnic folk music including Slavic and Scandinavian styles. Modern-day traditional dance music is based mostly around schottisches, polkas and waltzes with instrumentation including fiddle, mandola, accordion and banjo.

The first singing school in Minnesota opened in St. Anthony (now part of Minneapolis) in 1851. The Plymouth Congregational Church of Minneapolis began a singing group in 1857, followed by the first such club for women only, the Lorelei Club (later the Ladies' Thursday Musical Chorus), in 1892.

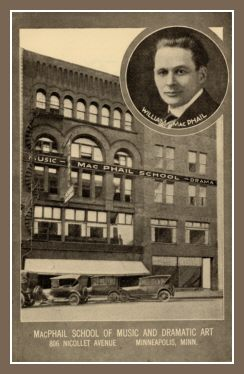
1920 image from the MacPhail Center for Music yearbook

Thousands of Norwegians settled in Minnesota in the last half of the 19th and first quarter of the 20th century. Subcultures formed based around village of origin (bygde), and then formed organizations to maintain their home dialect and musical traditions. These organizations held annual meetings (stevne) which featured folk dancing, singing, fiddling and poetry. In the late 1860s, male choirs with Norwegian and Swedish singers formed in cities and Lutheran colleges in Minnesota. These choirs sang a variety of popular and patriotic songs, hymns and folk tunes. In the 1880s, these choirs inspired the organization of singing societies that sponsored music festivals; in 1886, five singing clubs joined to become the Union of Scandinavian Singers, and the Norwegian Singers Association of America has met biannually since 1910.

The end of the 19th century also saw the foundation of two long-running music groups, the Thursday Musical Chorus and the Apollo Men's Musical Group. Two of the most important Minnesota musical institutions were founded in the early 20th century, namely the MacPhail School of Violin (1907, later becoming the MacPhail Center for Music) and the Minneapolis Symphony Orchestra (1903, later the Minnesota Orchestra).

Minneapolis became a home for vaudeville comedy known as bondkomik (rustic humor), which featured multi-act plays, dances, songs and monologues. Vaudeville shows usually ended with social dancing. Minneapolis' most famous performers were the Norwegian-descended Eleonora and Ethel Olson and Ernest and Clarence Iverson (Slim Jim & the Vagabond Kid), and Swedish immigrant Hjalmar Peterson, whose company dominated the stage for two decades before the Great Depression. General enthusiasm for Scandinavian musicals diminished in the face of intense propaganda and agitation toward foreign influence following the end of World War I, a process which was accelerated by the economic decline of the 1930s, and by the outbreak of World War II. Rural and regional dance music slowly died out, and became largely unknown. During this era, however, the Leikarring movement (song-dances without instrumental accompaniment) began. Leikarring celebrated national Norwegian folk dance and song through musical societies like Minnesota's Norrona Leikarring.

== Education ==
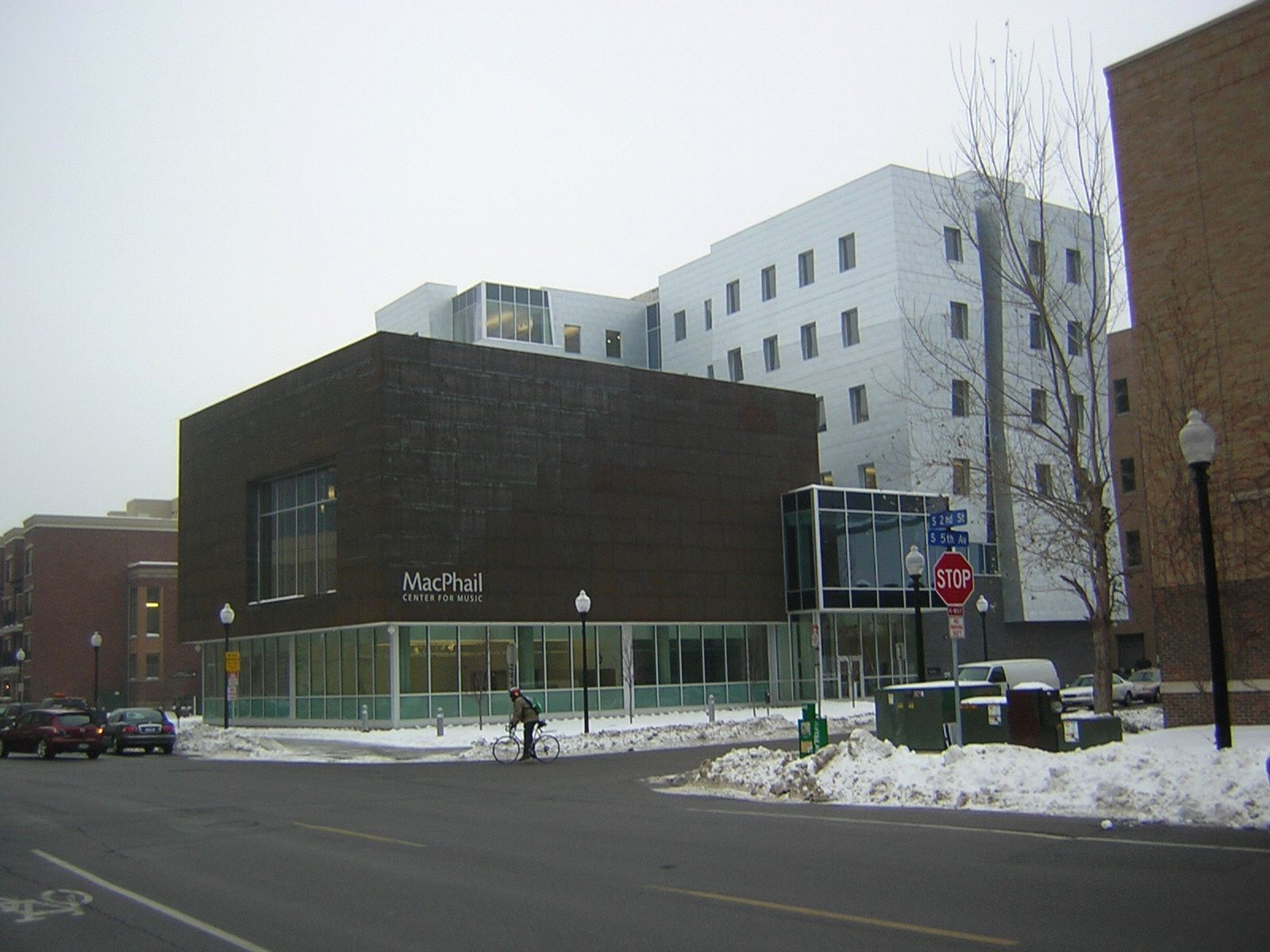
MacPhail Center for Music designed by James Dayton, who worked for five years for Frank Gehry

Minnesotan law provides that public elementary and middle schools offer at least three and require at least two courses in the following four arts areas: dance, music, theater and visual arts. Public high schools must offer at least three and require at least one of the following five arts areas: dance, media arts, music, theater or visual arts. Students may take music at the elementary and middle school ages, and many choose to take the subject as an elective in high school, where schools often organize marching bands, choruses and other performance opportunities. The Perpich Center for Arts Education is a school of choice which draws students from across the state, and has an extensive modern and classical music education program.

The MacPhail Center for Music employs instructors from all over the world, who teach classes on 35 different instruments, the Suzuki method, and art therapy, to more than 7,200 students each year at 45 locations.

Higher education in music is an important part of the programs at several of Minnesota's universities, including the University of Minnesota, which offers the Bachelor of Music degree in music education, therapy or performance, and graduate degrees in education, conducting and musicology. The School of Music also offers masters and doctorate degrees. The Duluth campus offers a Bachelor of Fine Arts in musical theatre. McNally Smith College of Music, a college of contemporary music based in Saint Paul, offered Bachelor of Music degrees in music performance, recording technology, and music business, and Associates Degrees and diploma programs in recording technology as well as the nation's first diploma in hip hop. McNally Smith College of Music closed in December 2017 due to a lack of funds.

== Venues ==
Large venues for popular national music acts in Minnesota include the Target Center, Grand Casino Arena, and US Bank Stadium. Northrop Auditorium on the University of Minnesota's main campus has a capacity of about 3,000, and hosts a variety of music and arts events. Among these is the University of Minnesota Marching Band's annual indoor concert series, which have been performed at the venue since 1961. The Armory and Roy Wilkins Auditorium also fill the need for mid-sized arenas at capacities of roughly 8,000 and 5,000 respectively.

Classical music is heard at Orchestra Hall in Minneapolis, a 2,500-seat auditorium "justly renowned for its rich, lively acoustics", and St. Paul's 1,900-seat Ordway Center for the Performing Arts. Older traditional theaters seating about 2,000 include Orpheum Theatre, Pantages Theatre, and State Theatre, all in Minneapolis, and the Ordway Center. The Guthrie Theater holds over 1,000, and The Cedar Cultural Center can seat 465.

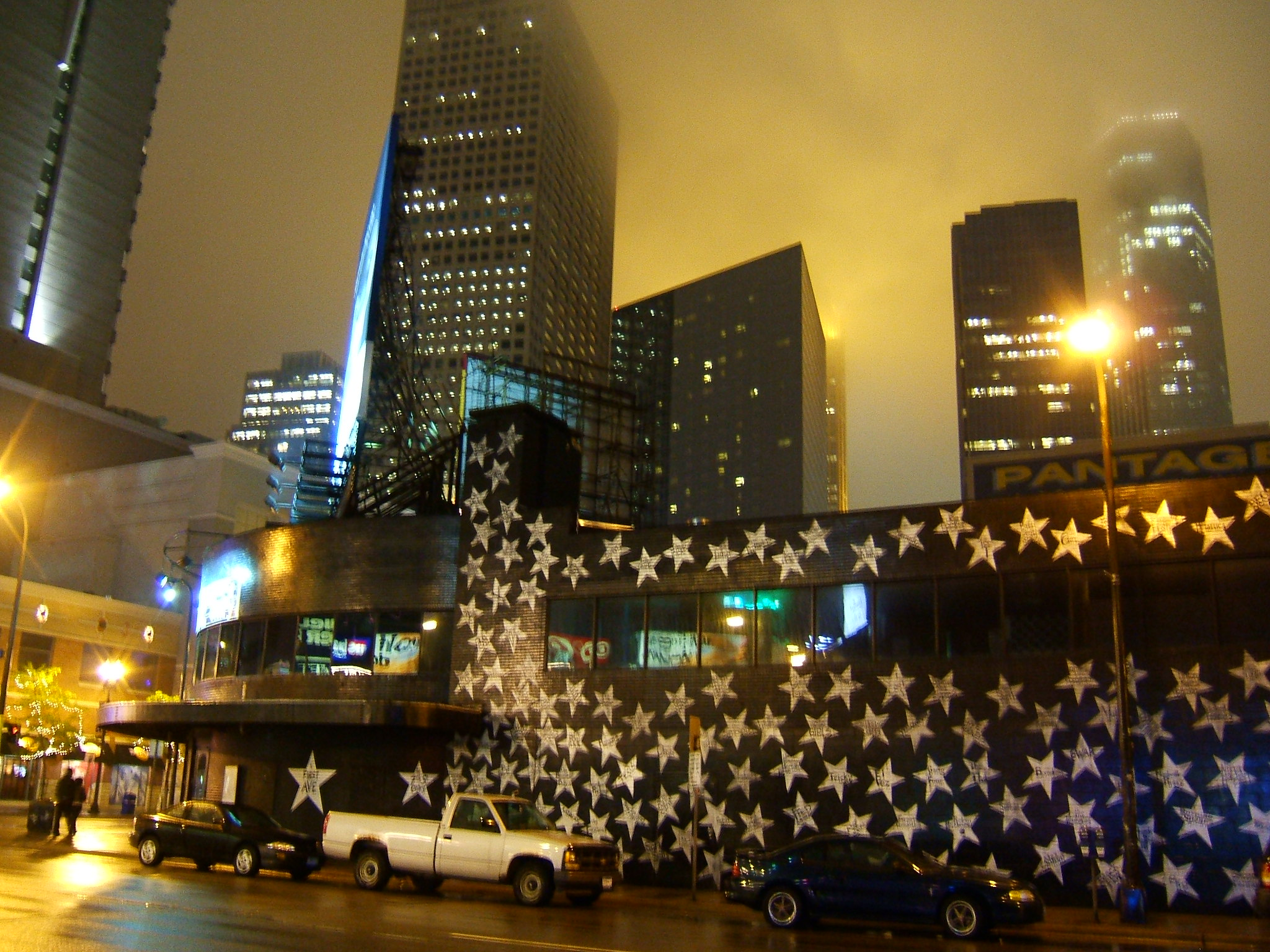
First Avenue nightclub

First Avenue, an influential music club in downtown Minneapolis, was opened as "The Depot" in 1970, and went through several name changes until it became "First Avenue & 7th Street Entry" in 1980. Its history of launching renowned acts such as Prince solidifies its importance in the current local scene and in Minnesota music history. The owners of First Avenue also operate the Palace Theatre in St. Paul.

Mid-sized clubs also comprise a large part of the Twin Cities music scene. One popular club is the Myth Nightclub (Also referred to as Myth Live) in Maplewood, a suburb of St. Paul. Numerous bands/artists have performed there including Akon, All American Rejects, Fall Out Boy, Lifehouse, Maroon 5, Melt-Banana, and many more renowned bands. Others include the Cabooze and the Amsterdam Bar & Hall, all of which host all-ages shows as long as they meet local curfew laws (Although some may be listed as 15+ or 16+ for legal liability reasons involving hardcore dancing and other forms of moshing). A notable St. Paul venue that serves local musicians is Minnesota Music Cafe; opened in 1997 it continues to offer live music 7 days a week.

Youth music venues, many of which operate as youth centers by day, include The Garage in Burnsville, Depot Coffee House in Hopkins, Enigma Teen Center in Shakopee, and on some occasions the Apple Valley Teen Center. Also, a few venues catering to crowds of all ages, now gone, are remembered as significant to the Twin Cities music scene. These include the Foxfire Coffee Lounge in downtown Minneapolis and the Fireball Espresso Café in Falcon Heights, St. Paul.

Other defunct but historically important venues include the Pence Opera House, the Coffeehouse Extempore or Extemporé, Jay's Longhorn Bar, and the Uptown Bar. The Prom Ballroom and Treasure Inn in Saint Paul and the Marigold Ballroom and the Flame Cafe in Minneapolis featured prominent jazz, rock, country and other bands in the mid-20th century.

Outside of the Twin Cities Metro Area important venues include the NorShor Theatre in Duluth, Chisholm's Ironworld U.S.A. (renamed the Minnesota Discovery Center), the Mayo Civic Center in Rochester, the Verizon Center in Mankato, and Ralph's Corner, for many years one of the premier indie rock clubs in the Fargo-Moorhead area. These venues are often played by hard rock bands such as Halestorm and Avenged Sevenfold that tend to draw more in "B-Markets".

== Radio ==
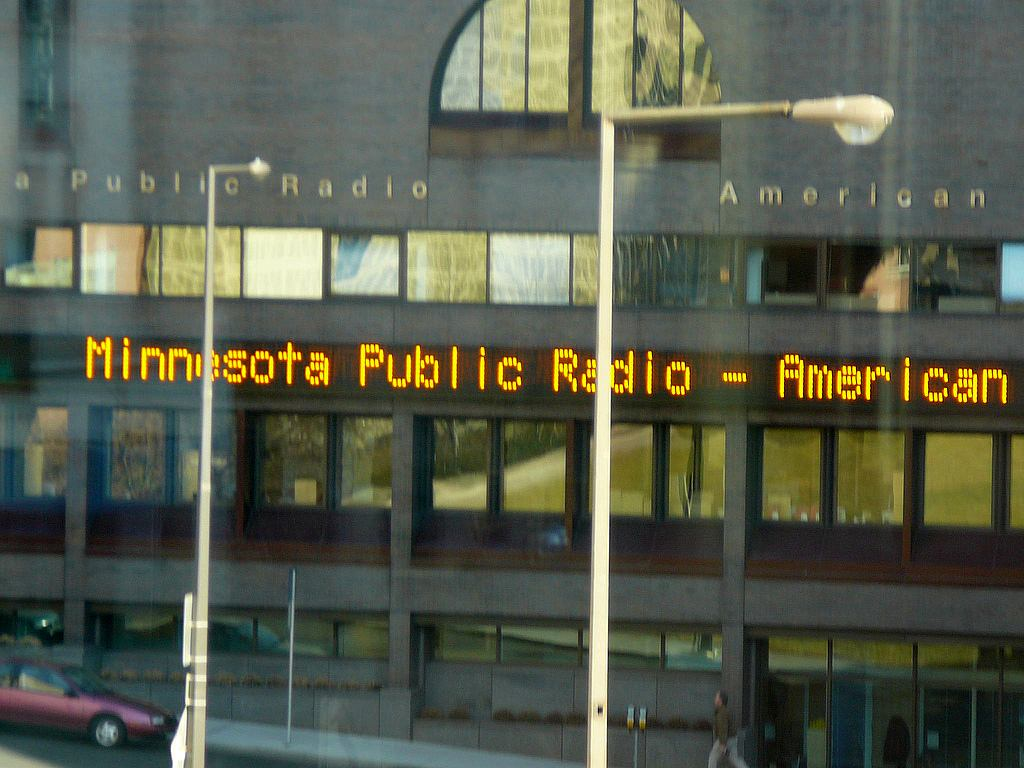
Minnesota Public Radio in St. Paul

AMPERS is a state-wide association of independently owned noncommercial stations that play music by local artists. These stations include KAXE, KBEM-FM, KFAI, KMOJ, KMSU, KMSK, KQAL, KSRQ, KUMM, KUOM (Radio K), KVSC, WDSE-FM and WTIP.

Minnesota Public Radio's KCMP "The Current" also plays the music of Minnesota artists.

== Recording studios and record stores ==
Minneapolis has been home to several important recording studios. The first studio in the state was Kay Bank, established by Amos Heilicher (who with his brother Daniel did "rack jobbing", jukebox distribution, and owned the Musicland chain), Vern Bank, and studio engineer Bruce Swedien in 1955. The studio recorded hits from The Trashmen ("Surfin' Bird"), Dave Dudley ("Six Days on the Road"), The Underbeats, The Chancellors, The High Spirits, and The Castaways ("Liar, Liar" in 1965). Kay Bank helped popularize Soma Records and a distinctive style based on using three-track recording and echo effects.

Herb Pilhofer and Tom Jung worked at Kay Bank before founding the world's first digital recording studio, Sound 80 in 1969. Sound 80 recorded numerous artists over the years, ranging from Bob Dylan's Blood on the Tracks to works from Dave Brubeck. The studio now is the headquarters of Orfield Laboratories, whose anechoic chamber, is labeled the world's "quietest room" by the Guinness Book of World Records as of 2012. Orfield lab also achieved the designation for their friends at Sound 80 as "the world's first digital recording studio" in the 2006 Guinness World Records. The two main studios are still fully intact, and they are filed for historic designation by the State and the Federal Government.

Other important studios in Minneapolis include the Dove studio, which released several cult classic psychedelic and garage rock recordings in the 1960s, Blackberry Way, founded by Paul Stark, who would later co-found the Twin/Tone record label. ESP Woody McBride's record label "Communique" and its subsidiaries "Sounds" and "Head in the Clouds" had released 100 records by 1998.

Prince's Paisley Park Studios was used both by Prince and for outside music production by artists such as Madonna, Boy George, the Fine Young Cannibals and Paula Abdul. The facility was also used for commercial production purposes like TV spots and movies, including 1993's Grumpy Old Men. Jimmy Jam and Terry Lewis founded Flyte Tyme on Nicollet Avenue in Minneapolis in 1985 and then moved to a 17,000-square-foot (1,600 m^{2}) complex in Edina, Minnesota, before relocating to Santa Monica, California, in 2004.

Flowers Studio in Minneapolis, founded in 1998 by the late Ed Ackerson, leader of the alternative rock bands Polara and the 27 Various, has hosted many notable musicians including the Jayhawks, The Replacements, Motion City Soundtrack, Golden Smog, and Soul Asylum.

The Twin Cities are home to a vibrant independent record store scene, including Treehouse Records (previously known as "Oar Folkjokeopus" and "North Country Music"), the Electric Fetus (also in Duluth and Saint Cloud), and Cheapo. Let It Be Records, although its storefront has closed, still sells vinyl in occasional public sales and by mail order. The now-defunct Northern Lights Music (and before it, Harpo's/Hot Licks) also carried many local and alternative artists during the 80s and 90s on Hennepin above 6th Street on Block E and at other metro locations in St. Paul's Midway, on White Bear Avenue (St. Paul) and Burnsville. The downtown Minneapolis Northern Lights store later moved to the former location of Music City, a longtime retail music store, at 700 Hennepin Avenue. The Midway Northern Lights location survives today as "Urban Lights" under different ownership, specializing in urban/funk/rap.

== Genres ==
=== Classical, choral and opera ===
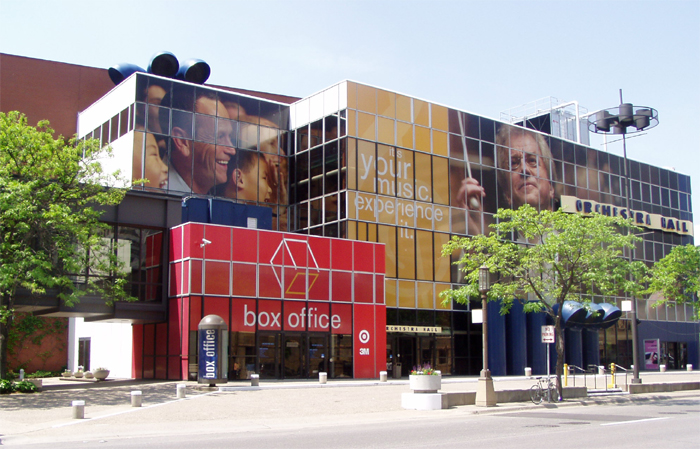
Orchestra Hall, Nicollet Mall, Minneapolis

Minnesota is home to many active classical music organizations.

Orchestral music in Minnesota is anchored by two major professional orchestras in the Twin Cities, several in other urban centers, and numerous other ensembles. The Minnesota Orchestra was founded in 1903 as the Minneapolis Symphony Orchestra. Although it was among the first to perform on the radio and to record, it initially was not known as one of the country's great orchestras. In the 1930s, Eugene Ormandy transformed it into an excellent ensemble and expanded its repertory, making it the most-recorded orchestra in the United States, and giving it an international reputation. Other illustrious conductors included Dimitri Mitropoulos and Antal Dorati. Osmo Vänskä, a Finnish conductor, music director since 2003, took the orchestra into its second century. Its live performances and recordings in a program of the complete works of Ludwig van Beethoven have been received with enthusiasm, the group has been called "brilliant", and a critic has stated the musicians are enjoying "their first golden age" since the days of Ormandy and Mitropoulos. Another critic wrote for The New Yorker of a concert in 2010 and its "uncanny, wrenching power, the kind you hear once or twice a decade" and thought that that day the Minnesota Orchestra was "the greatest orchestra in the world". The Saint Paul Chamber Orchestra is the only full-time professional chamber orchestra in the country, and also tours and records. Professional orchestral ensembles outside the Twin Cities include the Duluth Superior Symphony Orchestra and the Rochester Symphony Orchestra and Chorale.

The Twin Cities' oldest major choral society is The Bach Society of Minnesota (f. 1932). The New York Times International Datebook calls the Christmas performance of the St. Olaf College choir "one of the five significant global holiday events". Another major choral ensemble, VocalEssence, has done much to expand the national choral repertoire, with artistic director Philip Brunelle commissioning more than 100 new works for chorus.

For 42 years until 1986, the Metropolitan Opera was in seasonal residence at Northrop Auditorium during its spring tour. Opera is now staged by the Minnesota Opera, co-founded as Center Opera by Dominick Argento in 1963, as part of the Walker Art Center. With an early reputation as "progressive (and) 'alternative'", the Minnesota Opera began to include traditional works in its repertory when it merged with Saint Paul Opera in 1975. Today, the Twin Cities are home to other groups such as the Picnic Operetta, Really Spicy Opera, An Opera Theatre, Journey North Opera, Raison d'Etre Opera, while Duluth is home to Lyric Opera of the North.

The proliferation of church, amateur, and professional choirs in Minnesota has given the state the nickname "Land of 10,000 Choirs". The Minnesota Boychoir (f. 1962) is the oldest continuously operating Boys Choir in Minnesota and is currently under the leadership of Mark Johnson. The Boychoir has been involved with the Minnesota Orchestra, The Orpheum Theatre, The Zion dance company, as well as other regional and international tours.

=== Film scores ===
In addition to numerous composers and recording artists participating in film scoring, the Twin Cities are home to the annual Film Score Fest (f. 2014), which showcases new original, short films and their soundtracks through live orchestral performances.

=== Folk ===
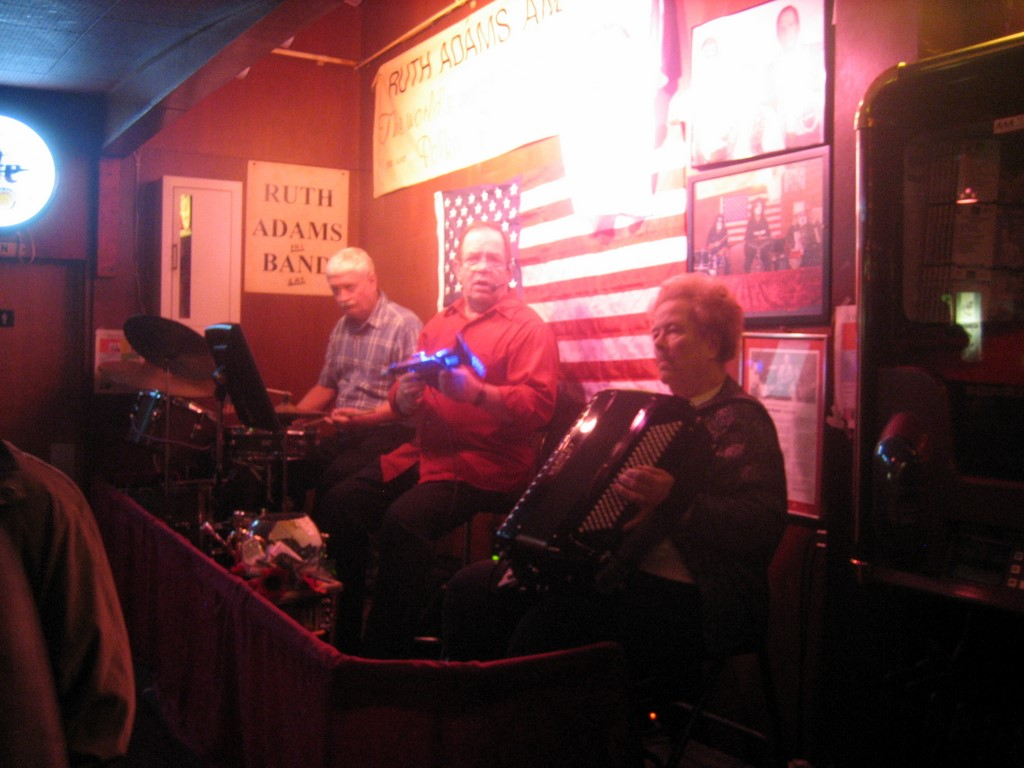
Ruth Adams and The World's Most Dangerous Polka Band, Nye's Polonaise, voted "The Best Bar in America" by Esquire in 2006

Minnesota is home to many ethnic groups, who brought with them the folk music of their homelands. When these immigrants settled in rural farming areas, their communities retained Old World social and religious patterns that gave a context for music performance. These ethnic communities frequently settled near each other, in Minnesota and in Iowa, Wisconsin, Illinois, North Dakota and South Dakota, and their musical and cultural identities blurred. Norwegians and Swedes frequently lived near each other in Minnesota, and Swedish, Finnish and Norwegian music merged into Scandinavian music. This music is perceived as a type of old-time music, which also developed from the area's German, Irish, English, Polish, Czech, and other Northern and Central European musics.

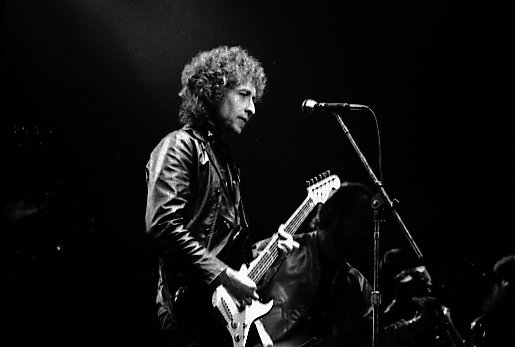
Bob Dylan in 1980

Norwegian folk dance (bygdedanser) includes participatory social dances and dances performed for an audience like springar, gangar and halling. The Norwegian gammeldans tradition, and those of other ancestries, continues in ethnic communities in Minnesota, where waltzes, schottisches or reinlander, and polkas are newer forms of old-time music. Vocal music includes short poetic songs called stev, emigrant ballads which expressed nostalgia for Norway and express hope, despair and loss about life in the United States. By the 1930s the Finnish epic Kalevala was still read and sometimes sung.

For those whose social life centered on churches where music was prohibited by the Pietist and other movements, music was sometimes done at home or disguised as a game. For others, secular, socialist and temperance halls became the community center where bands could include women. Musical accompaniment includes the accordion, violin, guitar, bass guitar, piano, harmonica, organ, banjo and mandolin. The Norwegian Hardanger fiddle or hardingfele tradition almost died out during the 1970s and then experienced a resurgence.

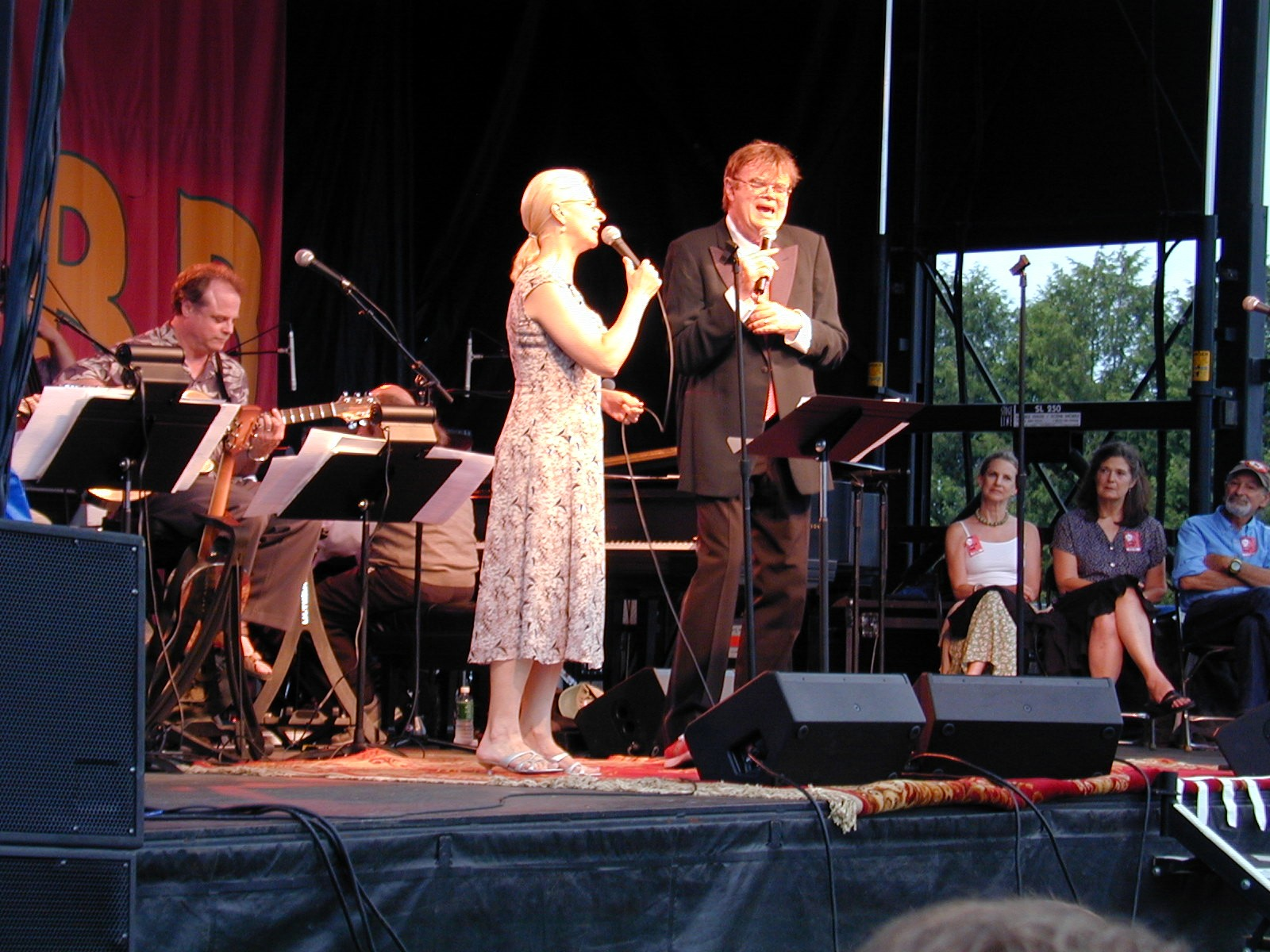
A Prairie Home Companion in 2005

In the 1960s, Bob Dylan, a native of Hibbing, became the first major mainstream solo star from Minnesota. Known for his unique lyricism and folk-rock style, he lived in Minneapolis from 1959 to 1961, attending the University of Minnesota, where he played at the Ten O'Clock Scholar in Dinkytown, adjacent to the university's Minneapolis campus. He was associated with Dinkytown, a bohemian area near the campus, where he listened to a wide variety of folk and blues. As of 2007, Dylan maintained a home in Minnesota. Bob Dylan the "King of Folk-Rock" had 5 #1 albums on the Billboard 200 from 1974 to 2009, including Planet Waves in '74.

The city's local folk scene produced a few well-known performers in the 1960s, besides Dylan who spent much of his early career based in New York, including the guitarist Leo Kottke and the trio Koerner, Ray & Glover. Folk music continues to be a major part of the Minnesota music scene, and is broadcast by the Prairie Home Companion, a radio show hosted by author Garrison Keillor; the Red House record label is the most influential local label for folk, and releases records by Ostroushko and Greg Brown, among others. Boiled in Lead who formed during the 1980s are still performing.

=== Gospel ===
Minnesota is a creative center of the gospel music tradition. Robert Robinson, a musical treasure who has been called "the Pavarotti of Gospel" and whose voice has been called "too big for radio", is the executive and artistic director of the Twin Cities Community Gospel Choir, which Minnesota Monthly said is the state's most-decorated gospel group.

Produced by Jimmy Jam and Terry Lewis, the Sounds of Blackness won three Grammy Awards for their music and have performed three times for audiences of 1 billion: at the 1994 World Cup, the 1996 Summer Olympics and the 1998 World Figure Skating Championships. Former Sounds of Blackness lead Ann Nesby has top-five hits on Billboard Hot Dance Club Songs charts and is the grandmother of American Idol finalist Paris Bennett.

=== Blues ===
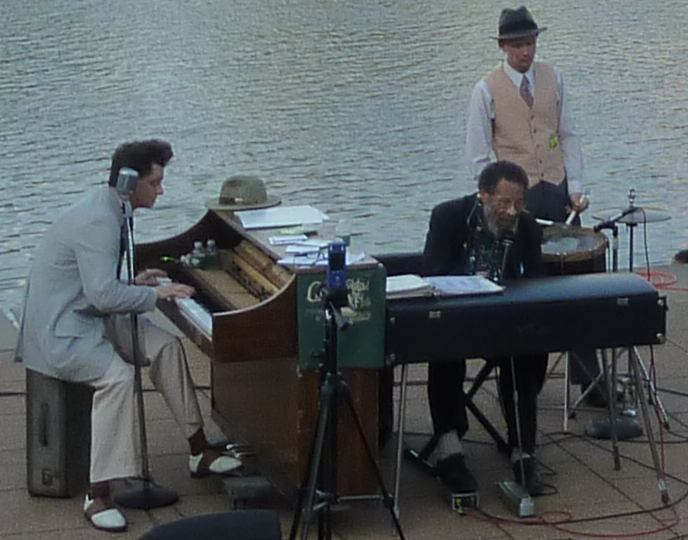
Cornbread Harris (center) sings "Deeper Blues" at Minneapolis downtown's National Night Out 2010 with Cadillac Kolstad and Johann Swenson

The blues tradition has been practiced in Minnesota for decades, notably by Lazy Bill Lucas and Percy Strother who lived and performed in Minneapolis. Willie Murphy, who replaced Willie Walker in Willie & The Bees was named "one of the three charter members of the Minnesota Music Hall of Fame, along with Bob Dylan and Prince," according to Blues on Stage, who added, "the Minnesota Music Association has given more nominations and awards to Willie and his groups than anyone else".

Other players gained loyal fans. Called "The Voice" by Tony Glover, Doug Maynard and his band backed Bonnie Raitt in 1982. Until he died at age 40, Maynard could "break a note into two and three parts simultaneously so that it sounded like he was harmonizing with himself". Larry Hayes, formerly of the Lamont Cranston Band, wrote "Excusez Moi Mon Cheri" which The Blues Brothers recorded. James Samuel "Cornbread" Harris, who collaborated with Augie Garcia and is the father of Jimmy Jam, is one of the area's senior players.

=== Jazz ===
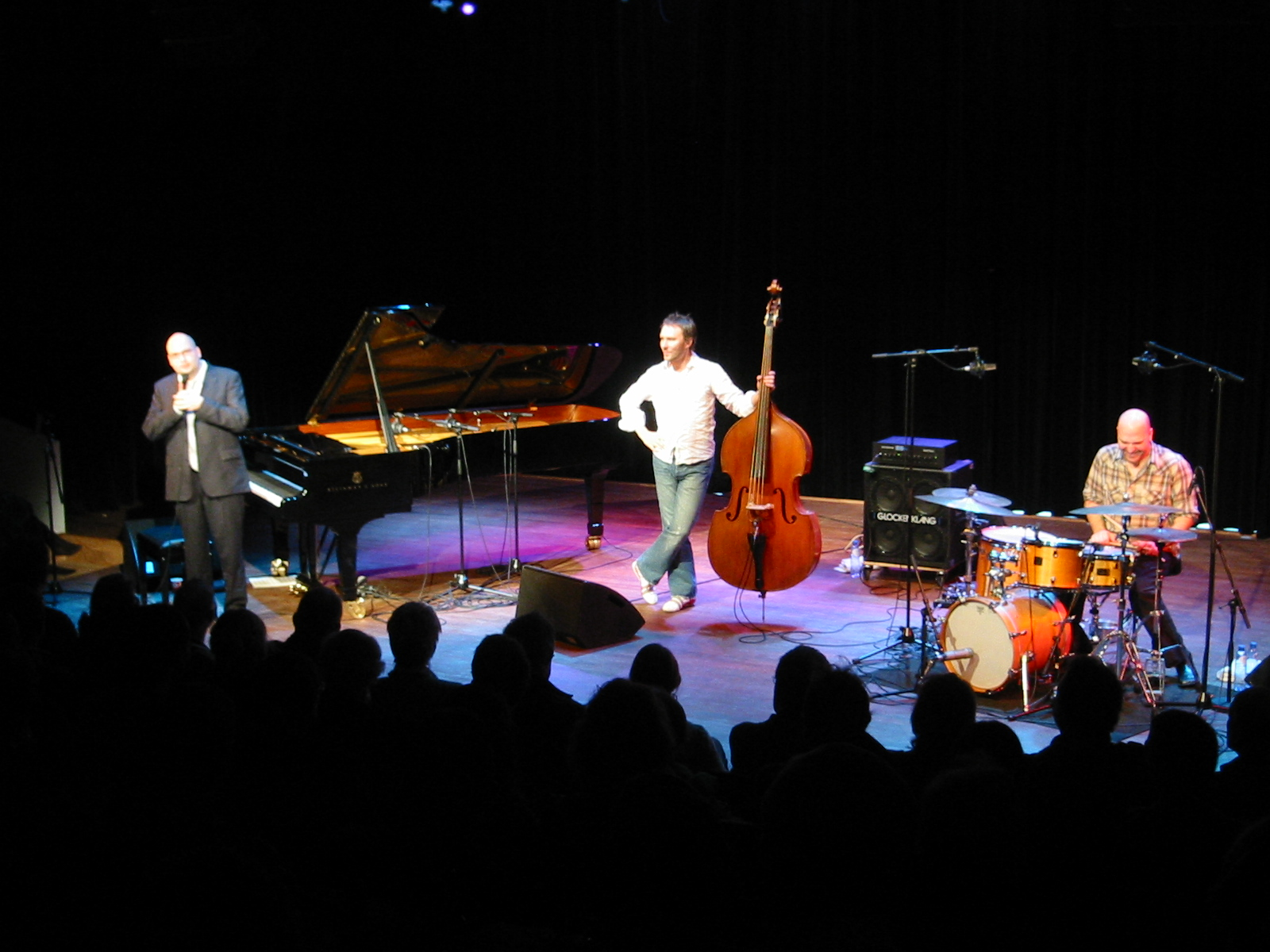
The Bad Plus in Amsterdam in 2005

Jazz has been alive in the state since World War II when the Andrews Sisters from Minneapolis recorded the song "Boogie Woogie Bugle Boy" which Bette Midler covered decades later. Local radio host Leigh Kamman covered jazz for more than sixty years, with vintage recordings and interviews with jazz artists.

Pamela Espeland of MinnPost.com has chronicled many of the 3,500 live jazz performances in the Twin Cities during 2009. Pianist Ethan Iverson and bassist Reid Anderson join Happy Apple drummer David King in The Bad Plus, who have performed during Christmas for ten years at the Dakota Jazz Club, a well-known local jazz venue. Composer and pianist Carei Thomas recently celebrated his 70th birthday at the Walker Art Center.

"No list of Minnesota music would be complete without mention of jazz great Jeanne Arland Peterson and her five children, Linda, Billy, Ricky, Patty, and Paul, as well as grandson Jason, who recently celebrated 22 years of performing their holiday shows." Dave Koz said, "There is no family in the world quite like the Petersons. First of all, there's like 700 of 'em, and each one is more talented than the rest."

Born, raised and residing in Minnesota, guitarist Reynold Philipsek performs gypsy jazz music as a solo artist, and with Minnesota gypsy jazz acts East Side, The Twin Cities Hot Club, and Sidewalk Café.

Maria Schneider, born in Windom, is a composer and bandleader who studied music theory and composition at the University of Minnesota.

Other musicians that live and play in Minnesota:

- George Cartwright
- Anthony Cox
- Eric Gravatt
- Leslie Vincent

=== Soul/R&B ===
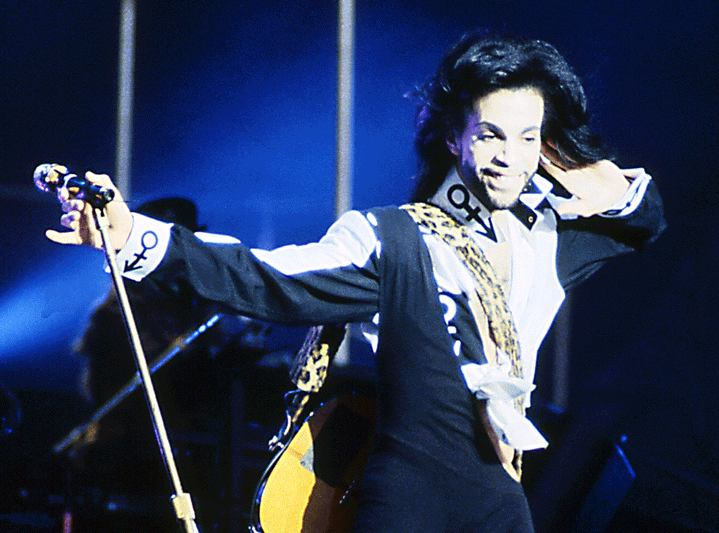
Prince invented the Minneapolis sound during the 1980s.

Minneapolis became noted as a center for rhythm and blues (R&B) in the 1980s, when the multi-talented star Prince (d. 2016) rose to fame. The city had little history in African American popular music, such as R&B, until Prince made his debut in 1978, eventually achieving five #1 hits on the Billboard Hot 100 with "When Doves Cry", "Let's Go Crazy", "Kiss", "Batdance" and "Cream". Prince also had eight #1 hits on the Hot R&B/Hip-Hop Songs chart from 1979 to 1991. He became the architect of the Minneapolis sound, a funk, rock and disco-influenced style of R&B, and inspired a legion of subsequent performers, including the Prince-related acts The Time, Wendy & Lisa and Vanity 6. Curtiss A, who opened for Prince the first time Prince played First Avenue in 1980, at first thought that it was nice of Prince to let him open and then later realized: "You know: 'You guys think this is the top thing in town? Well, here: Minneapolis got a brand new bag.'"

Prince fired Jimmy Jam and Terry Lewis from funk group The Time in 1983 because their production career began overtaking their roles in the band. Their Flyte Tyme Productions began to gain national attention, and excelled at mainstream urban contemporary music, which had often been shunned by critics. The pair's first mainstream breakthrough was Janet Jackson's Control in 1986, which propelled her career and spawned numerous projects seeing the writing/production team work with artists as varied as Twin Cities acts Mint Condition, Alexander O'Neal and Sounds of Blackness, to internationally established acts Michael Jackson, New Edition, Boyz II Men, Patti LaBelle, and Human League. Morris Day gained R&B hits "Oak Tree" and "Color of Success" in 1985. Also in 1985, Jesse Johnson's Revue had R&B hits "Be Your Man" and "Can You Help Me" and Johnson produced Ta Mara & the Seen's "Everybody Dance" that same year.

In 1980, Steven Greenberg and Cynthia Johnson, recording as Lipps Inc. at Sound 80, recorded "Funkytown", which reached #1 on both the U.S. and disco charts. The song became a cultural touchstone; Homer Simpson of "The Simpsons" said the song moved him like few others, and the song turned into the biggest seller in the history of the PolyGram label. During the mid-1980s, eight children of the Wolfgramm family became The Jets, who enjoyed eight top 10 hits. In 1998, Minneapolis R&B group Next had a #1 Hot 100 hit with "Too Close".

=== Rock ===
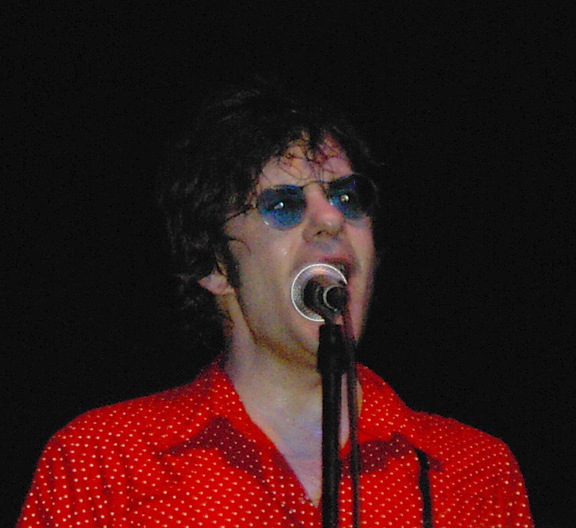
Paul Westerberg, at one time of The Replacements, in 2006

Rock and roll has a long history in the state. Garcia is remembered from the 1950s as the godfather of Minnesota rock 'n' roll. Called by Billboard "one of the top 10 most consistent chartmakers ever", Bobby Vee, who had 38 songs in the Hot 100 charts, continued to tour with his sons, The Vees, until he died. From the 1960s, a series of psychedelic and garage rock singles have become collector's items, including work of Mankato, Minnesota's The Gestures, The Litter's "Action Woman", "Faces" by T. C. Atlantic and Trip Thru Hell by the C. A. Quintet. "Surfin' Bird" by The Trashmen reached #4 on the Billboard Hot 100 in 1963, "Liar, Liar" by The Castaways charted at number 12 in 1965, and the song "Evil Woman (Don't Play Your Games With Me)" by the Minneapolis hard rock band Crow made the Billboard Top 20 in 1969.

While attending the University of Minnesota in the late 1970s, Yanni played keyboards and synthesizers in several Twin Cities rock bands. He joined the band Chameleon in the early 1980s and enjoyed moderate regional commercial success before embarking on his solo new-age music career.

Largely only known locally for new wave, The Suburbs were released under the local Twin/Tone Records label in 1978, and opened shows for Iggy Pop and The B-52's. The Suicide Commandos helped to galvanize a punk, new-wave community based at first out of Jay's Longhorn Bar.

Prior to the evolution of punk in the 1970s, there was little rock and roll tradition from Minneapolis, which author Steven Blush attributed to a lack of anything to "rebel against", noting that it was Minneapolis' friendly atmosphere that made future hardcore punk musicians "crazy and rebellious". "Every A&R person in New York was present at CBs while The Replacements joyously flushed the set down the toilet, doing nothing but fractions of other people's songs," said Peter Jesperson who recorded them for Twin/Tone.

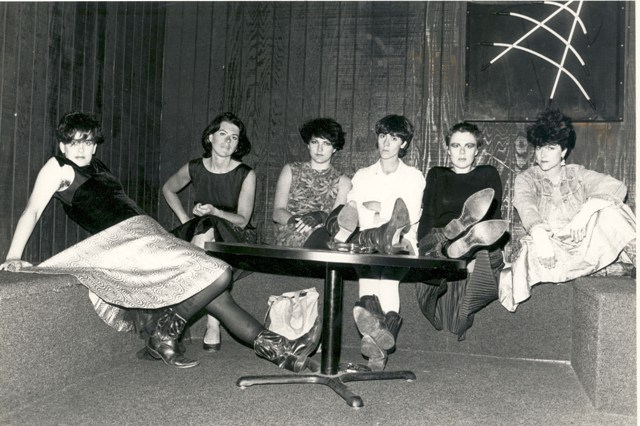
Têtes Noires, Minneapolis' first all-female rock band, backstage at First Avenue

In the mid-1970s, local musicians in the Minneapolis area began producing popular and innovative acts. Many signed to major record labels, and by the mid-1980s, some had achieved national prominence. The first female rock bands, Vixen from Saint Paul went on to success in Los Angeles and from Minneapolis, Têtes Noires released three albums. The hardcore punk scene grew with The Replacements and Hüsker Dü, who started too early to profit from, but were pivotal in, the development of alternative rock. The Replacements, who "might be the most legendary" Minnesota rock musicians, eventually achieved some limited mainstream success, which led to member Paul Westerberg's solo career, while Hüsker Dü started on local Reflex Records and became the first hardcore outfit to sign to a major label. Soul Asylum was originally a Minneapolis hardcore band called Loud Fast Rules, who played with bands like Willful Neglect, Man Sized Action, Rifle Sport and Breaking Circus; they mixed funk and thrash metal with other influences. The Twin Cities rock scene came to national prominence by 1984, when the Village Voice's critics poll, Pazz and Jop, named three Minneapolis recordings among the top ten of the year: Prince's Purple Rain, The Replacements' Let It Be, and Hüsker Dü's Zen Arcade.

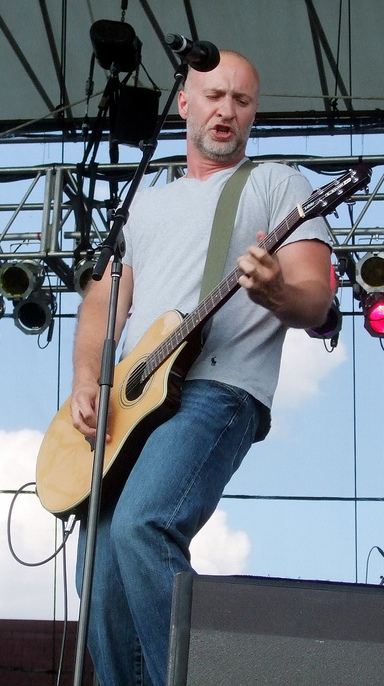
Bob Mould, formerly of Hüsker Dü and Sugar, in 2007

The late 1980s saw new sounds coming out of the state, when two singles from electronic band Information Society, "What's On Your Mind? (Pure Energy)" and "Walking Away", were MTV favorites. The Jayhawks are a long-lived country-roots rock band who started in the mid-1980s. Another group to form about the same time was Babes in Toyland, an early quasi-riot grrl band. Many groups of the 1980s and 1990s eventually split up, and a number of other bands formed from the remnants. Bob Mould left Hüsker Dü after it imploded in 1988, to head Sugar and do solo projects. Trip Shakespeare eventually transformed into Semisonic, who gained popularity in the late 1990s with the song "Closing Time". Other prominent, recent rock acts from Minnesota include slowcore band Low and indie folk/bluegrass band Trampled by Turtles, both from Duluth, experimental rock band Cloud Cult and indie rockers Tapes 'n Tapes, both from Minneapolis. In the 2000s, Minnesota produced a number of acts such as Motion City Soundtrack, Owl City, Quietdrive, Sing It Loud and some metal and hardcore acts such as For All Those Sleeping, After the Burial, Write This Down and Four Letter Lie. Some of these acts like Motion City Soundtrack and Owl City went on to have minor mainstream success, Owl City gained a #1 Hot 100 hit with "Fireflies" in 2009. Emo pop-punk acts, such as Tiny Moving Parts, have been published in Alternative Press.

=== Hip hop ===
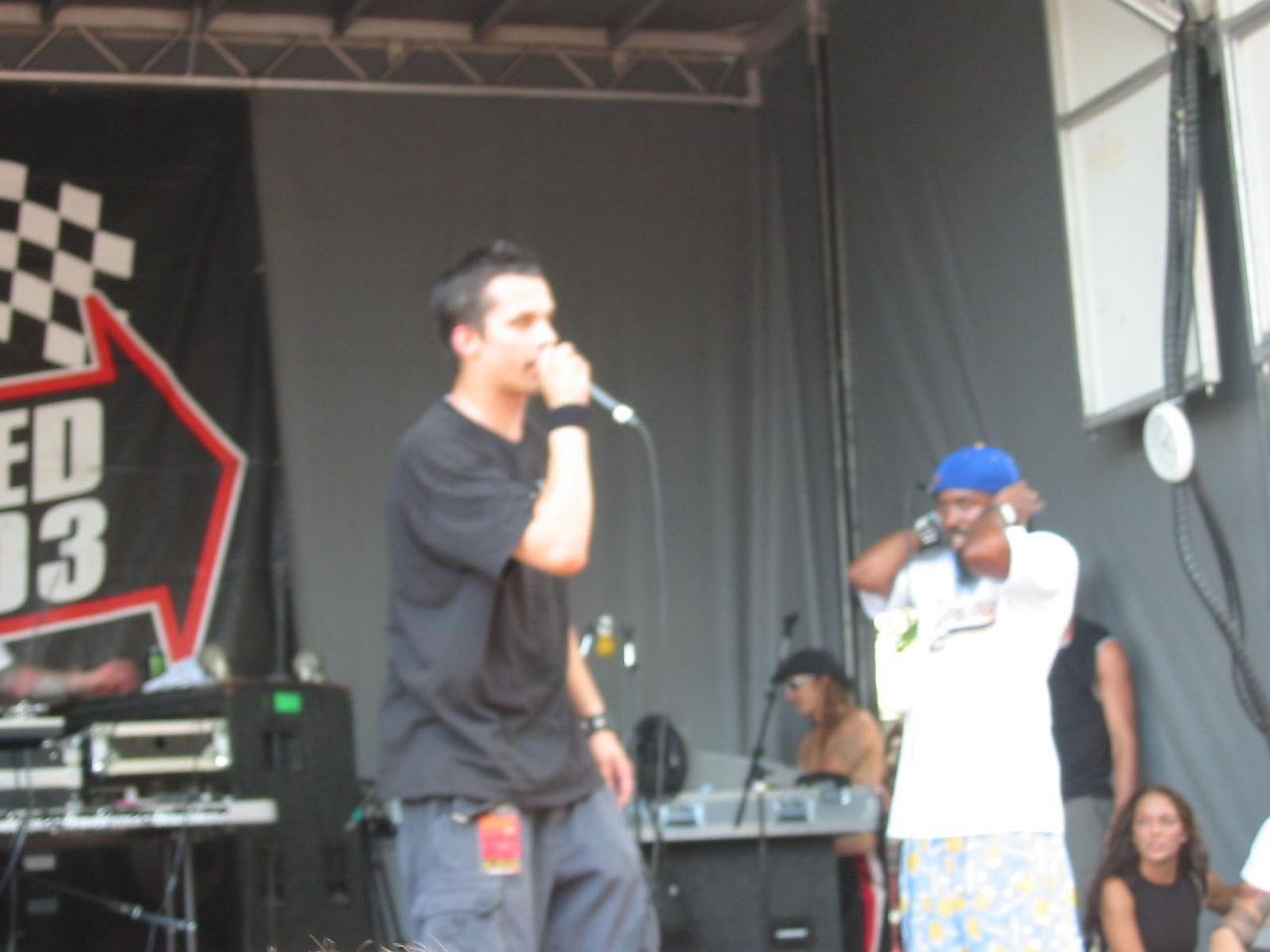
Slug of underground hip hop group Atmosphere, in 2003

The Twin Cities region is home to a thriving underground hip hop scene, due largely to the presence of Rhymesayers Entertainment. Rhymesayers' artists, including Eyedea & Abilities, Brother Ali, Los Nativos, Musab, and, most notably, Atmosphere, began to receive national attention in the late 1990s.

Heiruspecs won City Pages "Best Live Artist" in 2004, and in the same year Doomtree won "Best Hip Hop Artist". For the past several years, through 2008, the scene owed some of its success to the annual Twin Cities Celebration of Hip Hop sponsored by Yo! The Movement and the website D. U. Nation. In 2014 Manny Phesto was given "Best MN Releases" title by Pitchfork Media and was credited by XXL with getting Ghosface Killah and Action Bronson to agree on something. In 2019, Lizzo had a #1 Hot 100 hit with "Truth Hurts". "

=== Electronic dance music ===
Two locally and internationally-recognized Minneapolis electronic dance music artists are Woody McBride and Freddy Fresh (who walks a line with hip hop).

== Music about Minnesota ==
Several composers and performers have featured the state in their works. Classical composer Ferde Grofe depicted Minnesota in his Mississippi Suite. John Philip Sousa wrote "Foshay Tower-Washington Memorial March" for the dedication of the Foshay Tower in 1929. Sonja Thompson recorded "Dan Patch Two-Step", and Vern Sutton, Charlie Maguire, Peter Ostroushko and Ann Reed have recorded songs celebrating the Minnesota State Fair. Tom Waits released two songs about Minneapolis, "Christmas Card from a Hooker in Minneapolis" (Blue Valentine 1978) and "9th & Hennepin" (Rain Dogs 1985). In 1987, The Silencers released A Letter from St. Paul. In 1997, The Mountain Goats released a song entitled "Minnesota" on their album Full Force Galesburg. Lucinda Williams recorded "Minneapolis" (World Without Tears 2003). In 1975, Northern Light reached the Billboard charts when they released a song titled "Minnesota" that sang the praises of the state's natural beauty. In 2012, Ben Kyle released a song titled "Minneapolis" that illustrates the close relationship between St. Paul and Minneapolis.
