= Music of Minneapolis =

Overview of music traditions in Minneapolis, Minnesota, United States

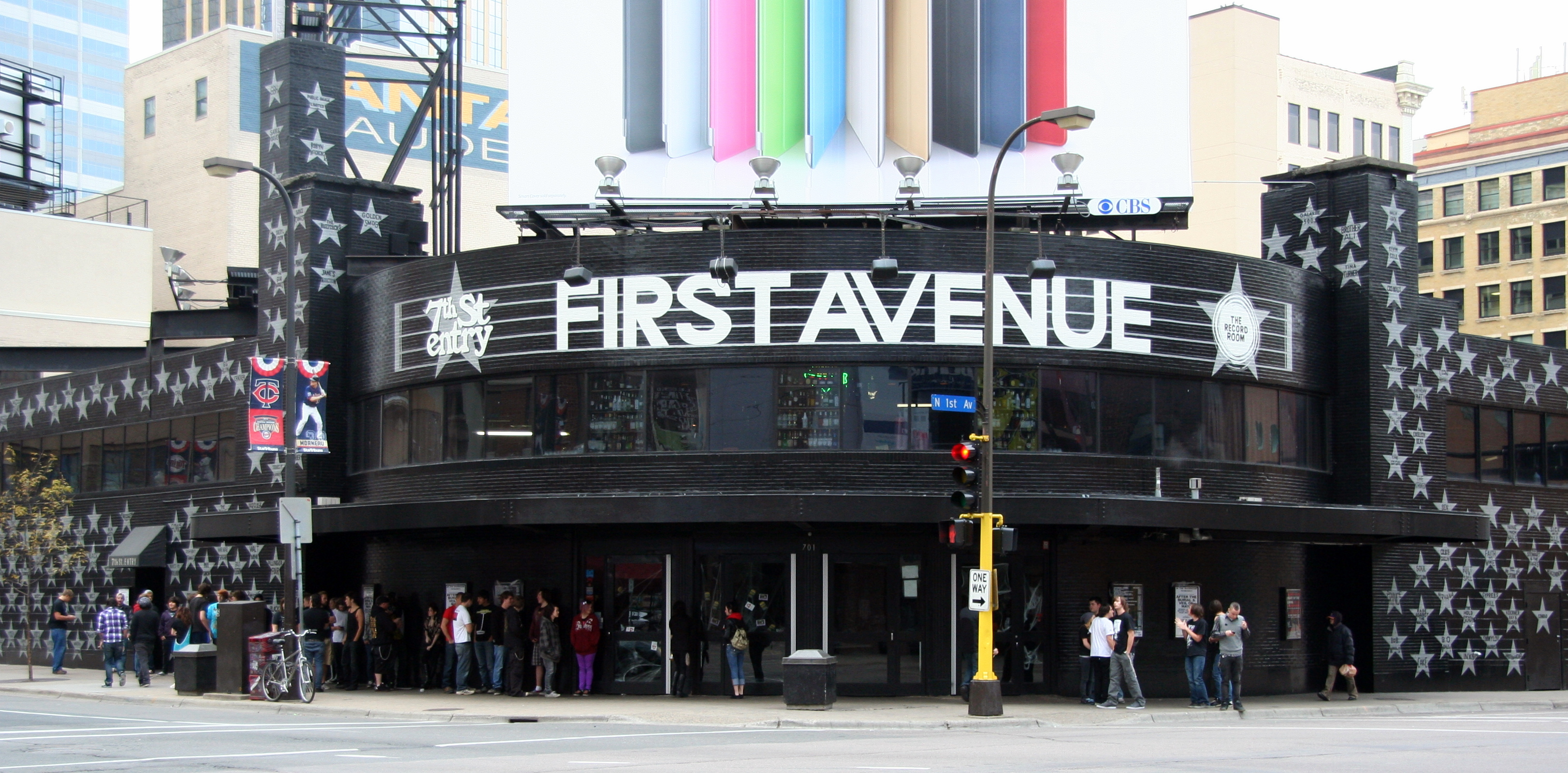
First Avenue nightclub in downtown Minneapolis, a key venue in the city's music history since 1970.

Minneapolis has contributed to American popular music, producing artists and movements with national and international influence. The city's development as a music center reflects a network of performance venues, recording studios, educational institutions, and community media outlets.

Notable artists associated with Minneapolis include Prince, who was born and raised in the city and remained based in the Twin Cities area throughout his career, and Bob Dylan, who began performing under that name while living in Minneapolis during the early 1960s.

The Minneapolis music scene has developed across neighborhoods such as South Minneapolis, Cedar-Riverside (the West Bank), and the North Side. Groups from neighboring Saint Paul such as Hüsker Dü, Information Society, Mint Condition, and Sounds of Blackness have also contributed to the city's musical identity. The city's influence spans multiple genres, including the American folk music revival of the 1960s, punk rock in the 1970s and 1980s, the Minneapolis Sound of the 1980s, the Twin Cities hip hop movement beginning in the 1990s, among others.

== Jazz ==
The Minneapolis jazz scene flourished in the 1920s and 1930s, with the city developing a distinctive jazz community centered around venues like the Flame Bar in North Minneapolis. Minneapolis and the wider Twin Cities metro have produced and hosted a number of jazz musicians, with activity concentrated in clubs such as the old Artists’ Quarter in Saint Paul and the Dakota Jazz Club in downtown Minneapolis. Tenor saxophonist and composer Irv Williams, who settled in Minnesota in the 1940s after service in the U.S. Navy, maintained regular weekly performances at the Dakota well into his 90s and has been described by the Minnesota Music Hall of Fame as a central figure in Twin Cities jazz history.

Pianist and vocalist Jeanne Arland Peterson grew up in Minneapolis and was often called the "First Lady of Jazz" in the Twin Cities; she was inducted into Minnesota music halls of fame for her radio, television, and live performance work.

== Folk revival (1950s–1960s) ==
Minneapolis played a documented role in the American folk music revival through the Dinkytown and West Bank coffeehouse circuit of the late 1950s and early 1960s. This period helped establish the city as a regional music hub, with venues such as the Ten O'Clock Scholar hosting emerging artists.

=== Bob Dylan's Minneapolis years ===
The acoustic trio Koerner, Ray & Glover, became central figures in the local folk scene, performing frequently in Dinkytown and on the West Bank. The most famous figure associated with this scene was Robert Zimmerman, who later became Bob Dylan. Zimmerman spent formative years performing and developing his musical identity in Minneapolis before moving to New York City.

While living in Minneapolis, Zimmerman became involved in the local folk scene and began performing under the name Bob Dylan. Koerner later recalled that Dylan's early work was “different from what all the rest of us were kinda about.” During this period, Zimmerman adopted the name Bob Dylan and became increasingly associated with the Minneapolis folk scene. He shifted his musical focus toward folk music, and immersed himself in traditional American folk songwriting while developing his distinctive vocal style and composing original material. Koerner later remarked that “Dylan's transformation from man to historical object began in Dinkytown.”

Dylan later recalled musicians from the Dinkytown folk scene in his memoir Chronicles: Volume One

== Rock and R&B foundations (1950s–1970s) ==
=== Rock and roll ===
Rock and roll in Minneapolis and the surrounding area emerged in the 1950s and 1960s. Local acts such as the Trashmen ("Surfin' Bird"), the Castaways ("Liar, Liar"), and Crow are often cited as early Upper Midwest rock groups whose singles reached national charts and helped define a regional surf, garage, and hard rock sound.

=== R&B, soul, and funk ===
Minneapolis and neighboring Saint Paul developed a local R&B, soul, and funk scene during the 1960s and 1970s. The scene included a number of Black and interracial bands that performed regularly in clubs across the Twin Cities. Musicians associated with this period included Willie Murphy, Willie Walker, Maurice Jacox, Wilbur Cole, and groups such as the Valdons, the Exciters, Band of Thieves, the Lewis Connection, and the Prophets of Peace.

Much of this music was centered on live performance rather than commercial recording. Bands frequently played for audiences in north Minneapolis venues such as the Riverview Supper Club, the Blue Note, and the Cozy Bar, as well as at clubs south of downtown including Mr. Lucky's and the Flame. Some musicians later described this circuit as racially mixed, particularly by the 1970s, although accounts of unequal treatment and police harassment at some venues have also been noted.

The era has been described by later historians and reissue producers as an important precursor to the Minneapolis Sound of the late 1970s and 1980s. Compilation projects such as Twin Cities Funk & Soul: Lost R&B Grooves From Minneapolis/St. Paul 1964–1979 helped bring renewed attention to performers from this period, including Dave Brady & the Stars, Maurice McKinnies, Jackie Harris, Wanda Davis, Mojo Buford, and the Lewis Connection.

Several musicians from this scene were later cited as part of the musical environment that preceded the rise of Prince and other Minneapolis artists associated with funk and pop in the 1980s. Although many of the groups received limited attention from national record labels during their active years, their recordings and live performances have been recognized in retrospective accounts of Twin Cities music history.

== Parallel scenes and national emergence (late 1970s–1980s) ==
The Minneapolis Sound developed alongside a separate punk and alternative rock scene in the city. While Prince and related artists created a hybrid of funk, R&B, and pop, bands such as Hüsker Dü and The Replacements were developing a guitar-driven style that later became associated with American alternative rock. Both scenes frequently performed at venues such as First Avenue and the 7th Street Entry.

The coexistence of these stylistically distinct scenes contributed to Minneapolis's emergence as a nationally recognized music center during the 1980s, with artists from both traditions achieving critical and commercial influence.

=== The Minneapolis Sound ===
By the late 1970s, musicians in Minneapolis began developing a distinctive style of funk and pop that blended elements of funk, rock, R&B, new wave, and electronic music, often featuring synthesizers, drum machines, and rhythm guitar in place of traditional horn arrangements. Recording studios such as Sound 80, founded in 1970 by engineer Tom Jung and composer Herb Pilhofer, played a role in the development of the city's recording industry.

=== Prince ===
Prince was born and raised in Minneapolis and became the central figure associated with the Minneapolis sound. A singer, songwriter, multi-instrumentalist, and producer, Prince recorded many of his early albums in Minnesota and frequently played most of the instruments on his recordings.

Early recordings with the Minneapolis funk group 94 East during the mid-1970s represented some of Prince's first studio work.

=== Expansion during the 1980s ===
The city's dance music scene also gained international attention when the Minneapolis group Lipps Inc. released the single “Funkytown” in 1980, which reached number one on several international music charts.

The Minneapolis Sound became widely associated with Prince after the release of his albums Dirty Mind (1980), Controversy (1981), and 1999 (1982). These albums established his national prominence, while the release of Purple Rain in 1984 brought international attention to both Prince and the Minneapolis music scene.

During the same period, producers Jimmy Jam and Terry Lewis emerged from the Minneapolis scene and established Flyte Tyme Productions. Their collaboration with Janet Jackson on Control (1986) catapulted the Minneapolis Sound into worldwide fame. The album fused R&B, rap, and the Minneapolis Sound into an unconventional and revolutionary style.

Jimmy Jam and Terry Lewis would go on to become a songwriting and producing duos, working with artists like Alexander O'Neal, S.O.S. Band, the Human League, Boyz II Men, Mariah Carey, and many more, spreading the Minneapolis Sound far beyond its origins.

=== Later developments ===
Elements of the Minneapolis Sound continued to influence later artists from the Twin Cities. Prince's backing group the New Power Generation incorporated hip-hop and contemporary R&B influences during the 1990s. Other Twin Cities acts, including the band Mint Condition and the R&B trio Next, achieved commercial success during the 1990s and helped continue the region's tradition of rhythm-and-blues-influenced popular music.

=== Influence ===
Music critics and historians have cited the Minneapolis Sound as an influential development in 1980s pop and R&B. According to The New Rolling Stone Album Guide, "the Minneapolis sound... loomed over mid-'80s R&B and pop, not to mention the next two decades' worth of electro, house, and techno"

=== Punk, hardcore, and alternative rock ===
The Minneapolis punk and hardcore scene emerged in the mid-1970s and expanded rapidly through the 1980s around a strong DIY network of bands, venues, independent labels, and zines. The scene is best known internationally for bands such as Hüsker Dü, The Replacements, and Soul Asylum, though it has included a large network of local groups, record stores, all-ages venues, and volunteer-run organizations that sustained the local music infrastructure for decades.

The development of the Minneapolis punk scene occurred concurrently with the rise of the Minneapolis Sound associated with Prince and related R&B and funk artists. Although the scenes differed stylistically, both were centered in the same network of venues, particularly First Avenue and the 7th Street Entry, and contributed to the city's growing national musical profile during the early 1980s.

=== Early roots (mid-1970s–late 1970s) ===
Minneapolis had relatively little infrastructure for original rock music in the early 1970s, as many clubs primarily booked cover bands and mainstream rock acts. Early punk-influenced musicians therefore developed their own network of venues and performance spaces. The Suicide Commandos, who are often regarded as pioneers of Minnesota punk, combined influences from Detroit proto-punk, New York City punk, and 1960s garage rock, helping establish a distinct local sound.

=== Twin/Tone Records (late 1970s–mid 1980s) ===
By 1979, the Saint Paul trio Hüsker Dü and Minneapolis band The Replacements had emerged as leading figures in the regional punk scene. Hüsker Dü became known for high-speed hardcore that later evolved into melodic, emotionally driven rock, influencing numerous alternative bands. The Replacements blended punk, rock, and country influences and became one of the defining American alternative rock bands of the 1980s.

During this period the scene developed enough momentum to support a dedicated independent label, Twin/Tone Records, founded in 1977 by Peter Jesperson, Paul Stark, and Charley Hallman. Twin/Tone released recordings by acts such as The Suburbs, Curtiss A, The Suicide Commandos, and numerous regional underground artists, becoming a central institution in Minneapolis independent rock.

=== Hardcore wave and DIY culture (early–mid 1980s) ===
Hardcore punk became prominent in Minneapolis during the early 1980s, influenced in part by touring bands such as Black Flag and D.O.A. performing at venues including Jay's Longhorn and the 7th Street Entry. Local musicians and organizers built a strong DIY culture centered on self-run shows, independent zines, and small labels.

Bands contributing to the city's early hardcore identity included Loud Fast Rules (later Soul Asylum), Todlachen, Rifle Sport, Red Meat, and Man Sized Action. Together, these artists, supported by local venues, labels, and independent promoters, helped establish Minneapolis as a hub for American punk, post-punk, and early alternative rock.

=== Noise rock, post-hardcore, and indie expansion (late 1980s–1990s) ===
By the late 1980s, musicians emerging from the Twin Cities hardcore scene began experimenting with more abrasive and experimental forms of punk and alternative rock. The infrastructure created during the early 1980s—independent labels, small venues, and a strong DIY network—allowed a new generation of bands to develop styles that blended hardcore punk with noise rock, post-hardcore, and other underground genres.

Halo of Flies/H•O•F is frequently cited in histories of noise rock. Formed in 1986 by guitarist and vocalist Tom "Haze" Hazelmyer, bassist Tim "Mac" McLaughlin, and drummer John Anglim, the band became closely associated with the emerging noise rock movement in Minneapolis. Hazelmyer also founded Amphetamine Reptile Records, an independent label that later gained international recognition for documenting the noise rock and underground alternative scenes of the late 1980s and 1990s.

Another prominent band from this period was Cows, formed in Minneapolis in the mid-1980s. Known for their confrontational performances and unconventional sound, the band combined elements of punk rock, noise rock, and experimental music. Their lineup included vocalist Shannon Selberg, bassist Kevin Rutmanis, guitarist Thor Eisentrager, and several drummers over the course of their career.

The late 1980s Minneapolis underground also produced Babes in Toyland, formed in 1987 by vocalist and guitarist Kat Bjelland with drummer Lori Barbero and bassist Michelle Leon. The band became associated with the emerging alternative rock and grunge movements of the early 1990s and is often discussed in relation to the broader riot grrrl movement, although the group formed before the term became widely used.

These bands expanded the stylistic boundaries of the Minneapolis punk and hardcore scene and helped establish the Twin Cities as an important center for noise rock, post-hardcore, and independent underground music during the late 1980s and 1990s.

== Expansion and diversification (1990s–2000s) ==
=== Hip-hop ===
Hip-hop in Minneapolis and neighboring Saint Paul, often referred to collectively as the Twin Cities hip-hop scene, emerged in the early 1980s through DJ parties, school events, and community radio. Early figures included DJ Travitron (Travis Lee), whose program Hip Hop Shop on community radio station KMOJ helped introduce the culture to local audiences.

One of the earliest recorded rap releases from Minneapolis is often cited as “The Twin City Rapp” (1985) by David "T.C." Ellis and an artist known as C.T. Subsequent recordings by groups such as I.R.M. Crew, including the singles “I Dream of DJs” (1986) and “Baseball” (1987), helped establish a small but growing local recording scene.

During the 1990s the local hip-hop community expanded through performances at venues such as First Avenue and events at the University of Minnesota. A major development occurred with the formation of the Headshots collective, a network of MCs and DJs that included artists such as Sean “Slug” Daley, Anthony “Ant” Davis, Spawn, and I Self Devine.

Several members of Headshots later founded Rhymesayers Entertainment in 1995. The independent label became one of the most prominent institutions in the Twin Cities hip-hop scene, releasing music by artists such as Atmosphere, Brother Ali, and Eyedea & Abilities.

Rhymesayers also established Fifth Element, a Minneapolis record store and cultural space that became an important gathering point for the local hip-hop community. The store closed on April 1, 2020, after 20 years of business.

Artists associated with the Rhymesayers scene included rapper Brother Ali and the duo Eyedea & Abilities. Eyedea (Michael Larsen) gained national attention after winning the freestyle competition on HBO's Russell Simmons Presents Def Poetry and later recorded several albums through Rhymesayers. During the 2000s additional artists and collectives expanded the city's independent hip-hop scene. The hip hop collective Doomtree, which includes artists such as P.O.S, Dessa, Sims and Lazerbeak, combined hip-hop with elements of indie rock and electronic music and gained a national following through touring and independent releases.

Rhymesayers also organized Soundset Music Festival, an annual hip-hop festival held in the Minneapolis–Saint Paul area beginning in 2008. The event brought national and international artists and was widely described as one of the largest hip‑hop festivals in the U.S., and for a stretch of years it was in fact regarded as the largest hip‑hop festival in the country.

== Music venues ==
Minneapolis has a long tradition of live music venues that have supported local and touring artists. One of the most prominent venues is First Avenue, a downtown nightclub that became internationally known after appearing in the film Purple Rain. Its smaller stage, the 7th Street Entry, has hosted performances by numerous emerging artists from the Twin Cities music scene.

Other venues associated with the city's music culture include the Dakota Jazz Club, the Varsity Theater, and the Minneapolis Armory. These venues have hosted performances across genres including jazz, rock, hip-hop, and folk.

== Record labels ==
Several independent record labels have played a role in developing Minneapolis musicians. Twin/Tone Records, founded in 1977, released early recordings by bands including The Replacements and Soul Asylum.

Other notable labels connected to the city's music scene include Rhymesayers Entertainment, which focuses on hip-hop, and Amphetamine Reptile Records, which became known for noise rock and alternative music during the late 1980s and 1990s.

== Radio ==
Several local community radio stations in Minneapolis and throughout the Twin Cities area have provided a platform for local musicians.

- KCMP 89.3 (The Current) - supports local music, featuring extensive Minneapolis and Minnesota artist rotation alongside independent and alternative music. It features "The Local Show" and a 24/7 "Local Current" stream dedicated to Minneapolis and regional talent.
- KFAI 90.3/106.7 FM - in Minneapolis heavily features local music and is a dedicated supporter of the Twin Cities music scene.
- KMOJ 89.9 FM - is a community-oriented station in Minneapolis that provides a platform for local Minneapolis sound artists, including hip-hop, R&B, and soul, and often airs tracks from local artists that other stations do not play.
- KUOM 770 AM, 100.7 FM, 104.5 FM, 106.5 FM (Radio K) - University of Minnesota College Radio. Radio K heavily features local music, acting as a major promoter for artists in the Twin Cities and Minnesota scenes. Dedicated local programming includes "Off the Record," "K Local," "The Vanguard," "Local Vibes," and "Behind the Scenes with Local Music Makers."
- KTCZ 97.1 FM (Cities 97.1) - in Minneapolis features local music and prioritizes local connection, though it operates as a commercial Hot AC (Adult Contemporary) station rather than a strictly independent local music station. The station features "Studio C," a in-house studio used to record local artists and bands performing live.
- KBEM 88.5 FM (Jazz88 FM) - features local Twin Cities and Minnesota music, specifically within its jazz and roots programming. The station highlights local artists through dedicated programs like "Minnesota Jazz Tracks" and "Local Showcases," plus in-studio live performances.
- KRSM 98.9 FM - features local music, acting as a hyper-local platform for South Minneapolis and the Twin Cities. The station highlights independent artists across various genres with shows like "SunDogs Present: Local Vibes" and "The Independent Artist Spotlight."
- WMCN 91.7 FM - Macalester College Radio - in St. Paul supports the Minneapolis-area music scene, including playing local artists and hosting live, and independent music.
