= College rock =

Music genre

- Stylistic origins: Post-punk; jangle pop; power pop; folk rock
- Cultural origins: Late 1970s; United States, Canada
- Derivative forms: Alternative rock; indie rock

Regional scenes
- Massachusetts; Twin Cities, Minnesota; Athens, Georgia

Other topics
- College radio; 120 Minutes; Billboard Modern Rock Tracks; CMJ New Music Report

College rock is rock music played on student-run university and college campus radio stations located in the United States and Canada in the 1980s and 1990s. The stations' playlists were often created by students who avoided the mainstream rock played on commercial radio stations. The term "College rock" is used to define the alternative rock of the 80s, before the term "alternative" became common usage in 90s.

== Characteristics ==
An outgrowth of hardcore punk, college rock originated less as a genre term and more as a signal of the medium — college radio — by which college rock acts were often heard. As a result, the genre featured a high degree of diversity and eclecticism, meaning that "on college radio ... screaming noise, retro country, avant-garde electronics, and power pop could coexist, linked by cheap-sounding singles recorded by local bands." Acknowledging this variety, some common aesthetics among college rock bands do exist, with some writers characterizing it largely as a combination of the experimentation of post-punk and new wave with a more melodic pop style and an underground sensibility. The A.V. Club explained, "Though hardly uniform in style, there were commonalities between the college-rock acts. Not really punk, hard rock, or art rock, most of these groups played conventionally hooky songs, heavy on jangle and twang, with lyrics steeped in poetic Americana."

== History ==
=== Forerunners ===
Pitchfork stated that "without the Byrds, the entirety of college rock—and, from it, indie rock—wouldn’t exist". Subsequently, Rolling Stone cited Alex Chilton's power pop band Big Star as a foundational influence on college rock and R.E.M., noting "[...] What the Velvet Underground was to punk, Big Star's Alex Chilton was to college rock." Other early influences included the Soft Boys, cult favorites in the US where bands like R.E.M. and the Replacements "memorized every lick," New Zealand's Dunedin sound bands such as the Clean as well as Mission of Burma, the dB's, the Embarrassment, Pylon and Camper Van Beethoven.

=== Late 1970s–1980s ===
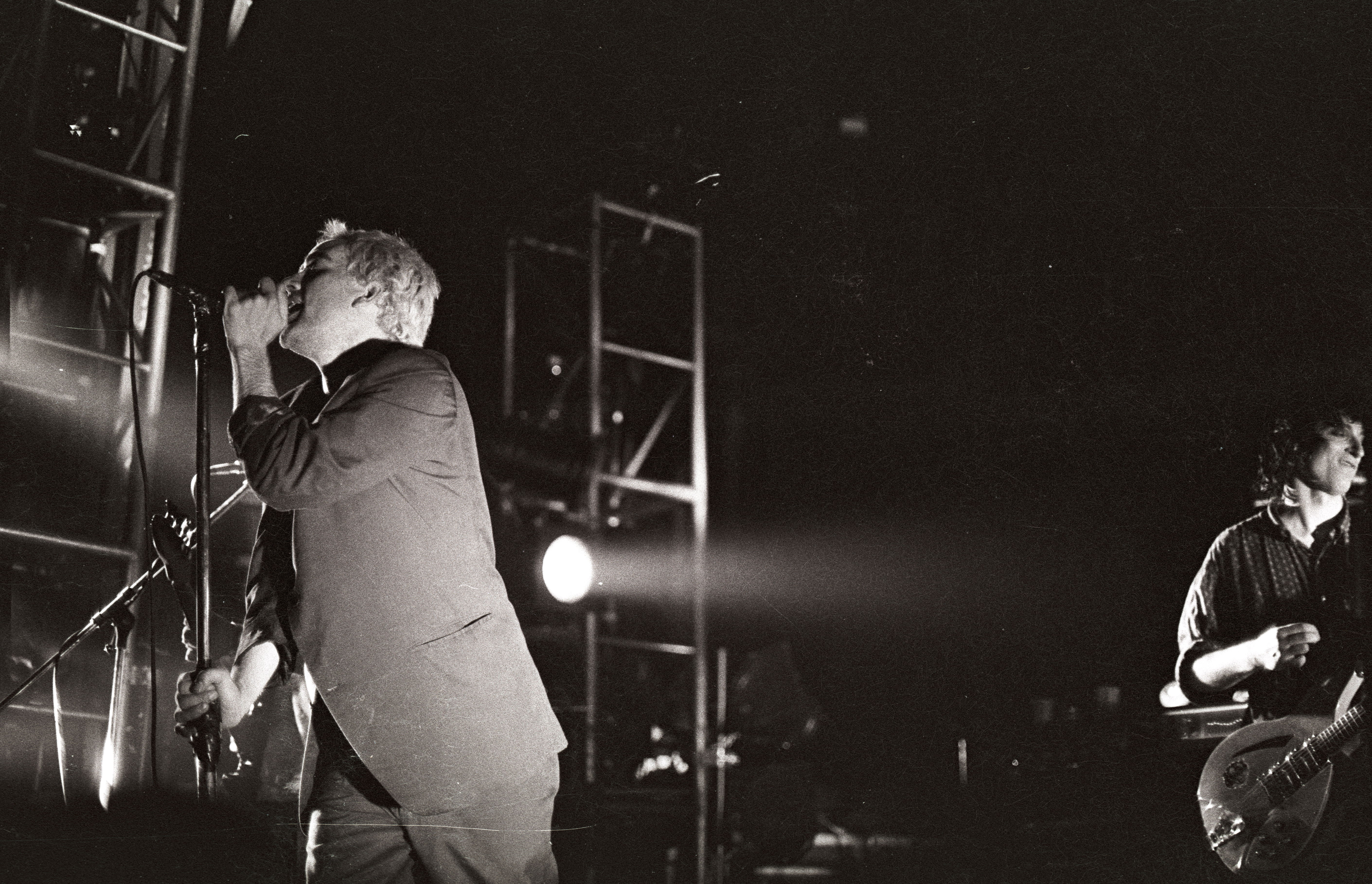
Michael Stipe (left) and Peter Buck (right) of R.E.M., a band which was among the first successful college rock acts.

College rock was an outgrowth of the new wave and post-punk musical scenes that developed in the late 1970s. Though not as avant-garde as post-punk or abrasive as hardcore punk, the genre tended to veer further from the synth-heavy mainstream. As explained by Rolling Stone, college rock's origins can be placed in Athens, Georgia, home of the University of Georgia and several college rock bands, such as R.E.M. The genre would expand to include a diverse array of regional scenes in several cities throughout the United States, particularly Minneapolis, home of the Replacements and Hüsker Dü, and Boston, home of Pixies and Throwing Muses. The genre also came to include several British alternative acts who incorporated elements of jangle pop or post-punk romanticism in their music, with bands such as the Smiths, the Cure, and the La's achieving success on American college radio stations.

Key to the success of college rock was the success of college radio stations throughout the United States. In The New Republic, Ian Svenonius attributed the proliferation of college rock stations to the FCC's decision to issue radio licenses to universities during the 1960s:

In the sixties, when FM radio was less typical, the FCC issued many Class D radio licenses to universities, which allowed them to create noncommercial stations on the little-used left side of dial (typically 88.1–90.5 FM).

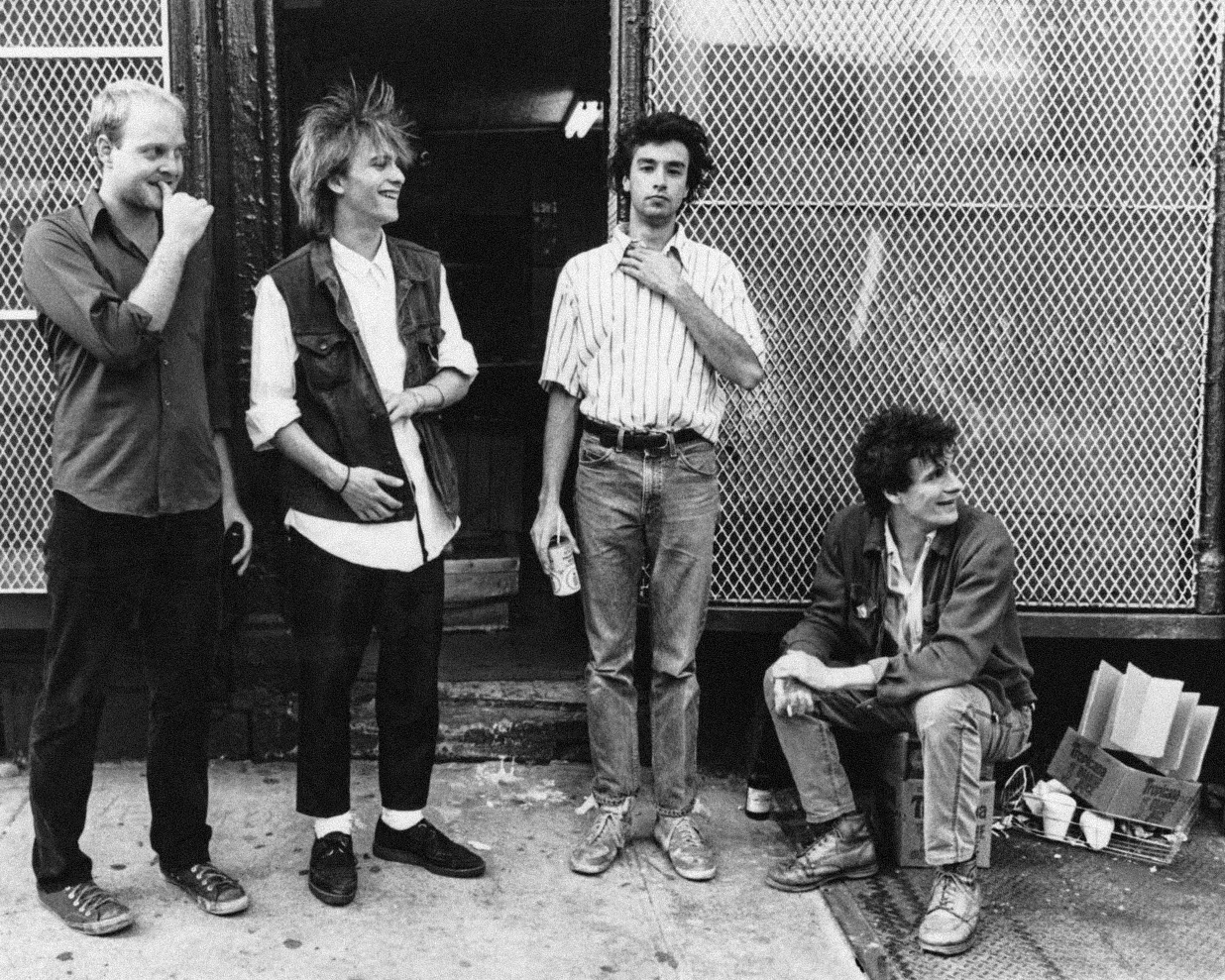
The Replacements, pictured in 1984, came from the Minneapolis alternative scene.

Many college radio stations during this period sought to promote music that went against the commercial style of the 1980s. Svenonius characterized these stations as being "staffed by music enthusiasts who worked without pay, and who saw college rock as a desperately needed alternative to the platinum tedium of 'classic' and Top 40 drivel." Reflecting the erudite tastes of these students, college rock programs were generally less militant and blunt than punk, but often featured a degree of activist sensibility. In contrast with many indie and punk bands, college rock acts often signed to major labels, albeit without becoming flagship acts for their record companies.

Other mediums began tracking college rock during this period. The CMJ New Music Report, a publication that reported on the scene, created a chart which measured popularity of artists played on college radio. The journal's charts were used by Rolling Stone magazine and other media. In September 1988, Billboard introduced the Modern Rock Tracks chart which monitored airplay on modern rock and college radio stations. 120 Minutes began on MTV as a program to feature music of the college rock style and compilations branded with the 120 Minutes name were released and featured several college rock bands.

By the early 1990s, college rock as a genre had been surpassed by grunge and indie rock in the alternative sphere. Svenonius points to NPR's aggressive campaign against left of the dial college stations as a cause: seeking to remove competition in this airspace, NPR reduced many college stations to closed circuit formats, if the stations were continued at all. Many remaining stations reformatted to capture the more abrasive styles of indie rock. Many 1980s college radio music directors went on to pursue successful careers in the mainstream American music industry.

== Notable examples ==
American artists came from a variety of regions, with many succeeding in college towns. Spurred by the success of bands such as R.E.M., the Athens, Georgia area became a hotbed of college rock, with acts such as Let's Active and Don Dixon achieving success. Minneapolis and St. Paul, Minnesota spawned a large contingent of college rock acts, including the Replacements, Hüsker Dü, the Suburbs, and Soul Asylum. Boston, home to several American universities, was also a hotspot for college rock, with bands such as Pixies, Dinosaur Jr., Throwing Muses, and the Del Fuegos building a following. Though these cities were major hubs, college rock acts proliferated throughout the US, from areas ranging from California (Red Hot Chili Peppers, Camper Van Beethoven) to New Jersey (the Smithereens, Dramarama).

Although not considered college rock bands in their native country, several UK-based acts also achieved success on the college rock circuit. Many of these acts, including the Smiths, the Cure and the La's, grew out of the UK's alternative scene and achieved greater mainstream success there. Other acts, such as Elvis Costello and Graham Parker, grew out of the British initial new wave scene and transitioned to the underground college circuits during the 1980s.

Similarly, Australian acts such as the Hoodoo Gurus and Midnight Oil appeared in college rock circles in the US.
