= WGZS =

Coordinates: 46.836°N 92.702°W

- Cloquet, Minnesota; United States
- Broadcast area: Northeastern Minnesota
- Frequency: 89.1 MHz
- RDS: PI: 671C; PS/RT: WGZS - Dibiki Giizis
- Branding: "89.1 WGZS"

Programming
- Format: Community radio
- Affiliations: AMPERS

Ownership
- Owner: Fond du Lac Band of Lake Superior Ojibwe

History
- First air date: 2011
- Call sign meaning: Giizis ("Moon" in the Anishinaabe language

Technical information
- Licensing authority: FCC
- Class: C2
- ERP: 50,000 watts
- HAAT: 135 m (443 ft)

Links
- Public license information: Public file; LMS
- Website: www.wgzs89.net

WGZS is a non-commercial FM radio station operating on 89.1 MHz from a transmitter on the Fond du Lac Indian Reservation in rural St. Louis County north of Cloquet. The station's coverage range includes portions of Aitkin, Carlton, Douglas and St. Louis counties, including all of Cloquet and large portions of Duluth and Superior. The station currently operates 24 hours a day, 7 days a week with a mix of mainstream American and Native American music, as well as regional and American Indian-oriented programming and local weather, events, and school closings.

The station is staffed by Dan Huculak and Pat Puchalla.

== Programs carried by WGZS 89.1 ==
- American Indian Living
- Earth Songs
- Indigenous in Music with Larry K
- Native America Calling
- Native Voice One
- Peace Talks Radio
- Voices from the Circle
- Minnesota Native News
- UnderCurrents
- Minnesota Military Radio
- Veterans Voices

== See also ==
- List of community radio stations in the United States
