= KVSC =

Radio station at St. Cloud State University in St. Cloud, Minnesota

Coordinates: 45.517°N 94.231°W

- St. Cloud, Minnesota; United States
- Frequency: 88.1 MHz (HD Radio)
- Branding: KVSC, Your Sound Alternative

Programming
- Format: College/Eclectic
- Subchannels: HD2: KVEX-LP simulcast (Classic Alternative Rock); HD3: Jazz; HD4: The Ice (Hip Hop)
- Affiliations: AMPERS

Ownership
- Owner: St. Cloud State University
- Sister stations: KVEX-LP

History
- First air date: May 10, 1967
- Call sign meaning: The Voice of St. Cloud

Technical information
- Licensing authority: FCC
- Facility ID: 62112
- Class: C2
- ERP: 16,500 watts
- HAAT: 136 m (446 ft)
- Repeater: (89.9-3) KMOJ-HD3 (Minneapolis-St. Paul)

Links
- Public license information: Public file; LMS
- Webcast: Listen live
- Website: kvsc.org

KVSC (88.1 FM) is a non-commercial educational college radio station in St. Cloud, Minnesota. Operated by St. Cloud State University (SCSU), KVSC is staffed by a combination of student employees and community volunteers. The station broadcasts an eclectic range of music, with an emphasis on modern alternative and indie rock. KVSC is well known for its annual 50-hour trivia competition and is a charter member of AMPERS (The Association of Minnesota Public and Educational Radio Stations).

== Coverage ==
KVSC broadcasts at 16,500 watts, reaching an estimated 70-mile radius that includes Stearns, Benton, Sherburne, Wright, Meeker, Kandiyohi, Todd, Morrison, Mille Lacs, Kanabec, and Isanti counties. Operating at 88.1 MHz, the station has adopted a secondary tagline, "The Farthest Left on Your FM Dial." Its transmitter is located just south of St. Cloud, near the junction of Highway 15 and Interstate 94. In addition to its standard analog signal, KVSC simulcasts throughout the Twin Cities metro area via the third HD Radio subchannel of KMOJ 89.9 and streams worldwide through the TuneIn app.

== History ==
Before the creation of KVSC, students at St. Cloud State University had no on-campus outlet radio broadcasting. That changed in 1960 with the formation of the university's radio guild, which marked SCSU's first foray into radio. The guild produced pre-recorded programming in campus studios for airplay on WJON (1240 AM). However, as members began developing content that didn't align with WJON's Sunday evening campus show, interest in an independent station grew. Recognizing the rising demand among students, the university moved to establish its own broadcasting facility. The university was granted a license and construction permit from the Federal Communications Commission in 1966.

KVSC first began broadcasting at 88.5 MHz operations as a 10-watt, Class D broadcast facility on Wednesday, May 10, 1967. With a limited broadcast range of just 10 to 12 miles, the station was intended to serve the immediate St. Cloud area. Its call letters - KVSC - were chosen to represent "The Voice of Saint Cloud." Funded primarily through student activity fees and the St. Cloud State University Department of Mass Communications, the station operated on a modest budget, requiring minimal external support beyond equipment purchases and repairs. Co-supervised by Mass Communications Department co-founder E. Scott Bryce and faculty coordinator Garry Hawkins, KVSC named Andy J. Marlow as its first Student General Manager.

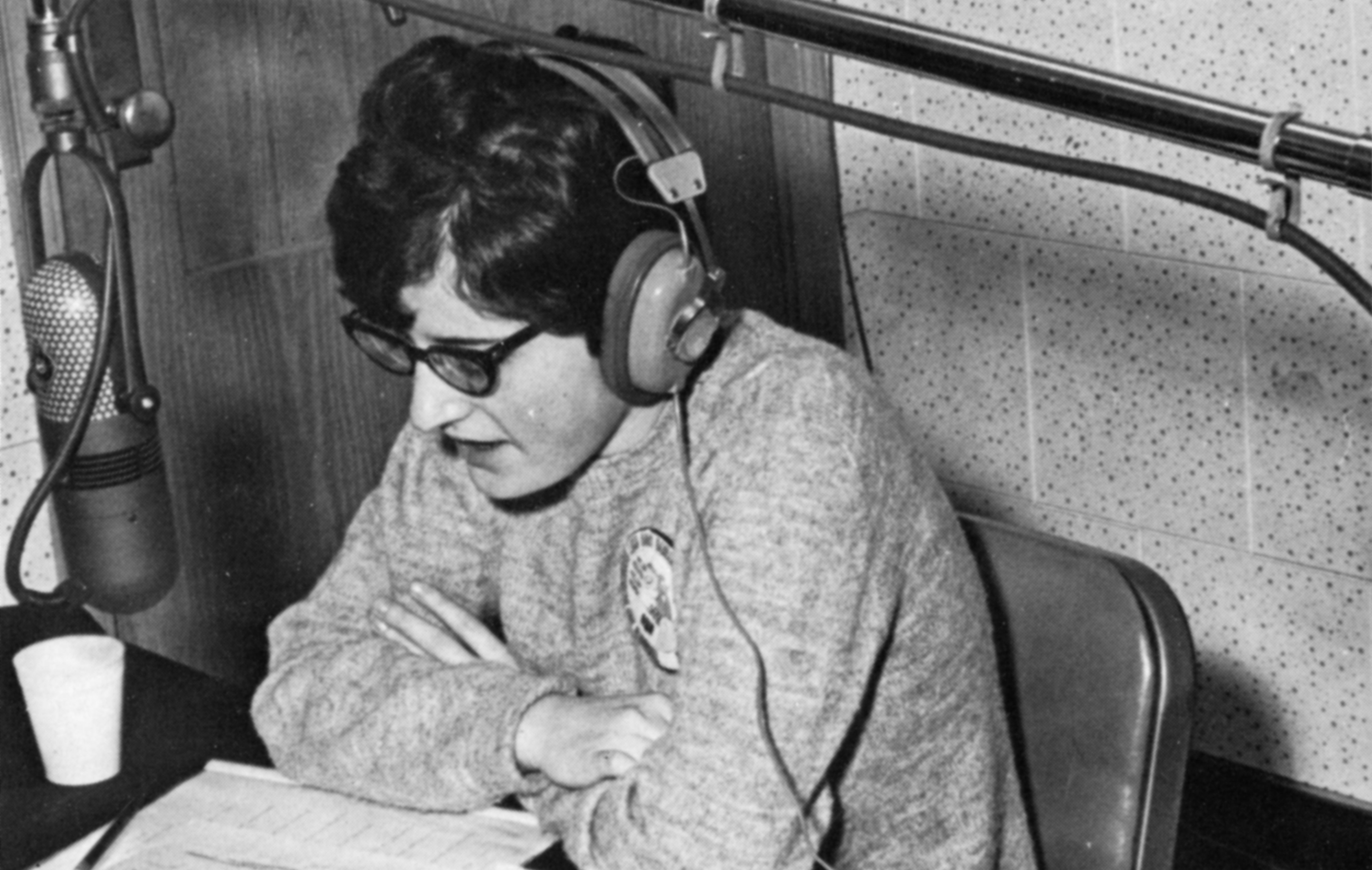
Rita Kremer broadcasts at KVSC, St. Cloud State University, 1967-1968

KVSC initially operated with limited broadcast hours, airing only during the academic year. Its original music format was predominantly classical, with smaller portions of pop, jazz, folk and musical theater woven into the schedule. The station also featured audio documentaries, news segments, sports commentary and re-broadcasts of serials from The Golden Age of Radio. In 1969, KVSC started broadcasting a condensed version of its programming over summer months. By the mid-1970s, KVSC had shifted to a progressive rock radio format, reflecting a broader transformation in college radio trends.

Throughout the 1970s, KVSC made multiple attempts to increase its broadcast power. Approval was finally secured in 1981, and, on February 8, 1983, the station moved to 88.1 MHz and boosted its output to 5,200 watts. This upgrade elevated KVSC to a Class C2 operation, licensed to operate 20 hours per day. However, the increased power led to interference with local television signals. Just over one month later, St. Cloud State University voluntarily reduced KVSC's output power to 1,300 watts pending a long-term solution.

As KVSC's signal reached a broader audience, its programming also evolved. In 1983, the station adopted the slogan "Your Sound Alternative", highlighting its support of the emerging college rock scene. However, the station's programming wasn't unanimously viewed positively. A student-submitted letter published in the April 19 issue of the St. Cloud State University Chronicle, titled "KVSC Format Needs Change; Music Reflects Slide in Morals," criticized the station's direction. Rebuttals followed in the April 22 and 26 editions, with two KVSC staff members stating opposing positions to the letter. The debate drew widespread attention, leading to a surge in student attendance at radio guild meetings. Tensions mounted, and university administration were eventually called in to mediate.

On June 18, 1984, General Manager Neil Thelen and Student General Manager Chris Mitchell implemented a Top 40 radio format. This change led to internal upheaval, a loss of distinct identity, and several staff resignations. In spring 1985, university administration intervened, overturning the decision and restoring the station's alternative format. Many former staff members returned shortly thereafter. During the summer of 1986, the university approved the creation of KVSC's first full-time paid staff position, replacing the student-led radio guild. Kevin Ridley, a graduate of SCSU's Mass Communications program, was appointed Station Manager and served as the station's liaison to university administration.

In February 1991, KVSC again faced an existential threat. Following years of financial complications and coinciding with a proposed increase in broadcast power, St. Cloud State University considered eliminating the station's funding. In response, KVSC launched its first listener-funded membership drive - a fundraising tradition that has continued biannually since. Amid the budget crisis, Ridley's employment was terminated on June 30, 1992. He was succeeded by Jo McMullen-Boyer, another Mass Communications graduate. With an outpouring of community support, KVSC secured the funding necessary to increase its signal strength to 16,500 watts on September 24, 1992.

In September 1994, KVSC began broadcasting 24 hours a day. Five years later, in October 1999, the station launched its website, kvsc.org, with support from Cloudnet, a local internet service provider. McMullen-Boyer remained station manager until her retirement in April 2023. The station is currently led by Dan Seeger, with Jim Gray serving as Director of Operations.

== Programming ==
KVSC's general programming features an eclectic blend of alternative and indie rock, with significant airplay dedicated to Americana, indie pop, alt-country, and local Minnesota artists. The station also boasts a diverse roster of specialty programs that specialize in playing specific genres. Notable examples include Frets (folk and bluegrass), Thriving On A Riff (jazz), Undercurrents (punk rock) and House Of Flow (hip hop). KVSC has also aired syndicated content such as Live on KEXP and various programs produced by Koahnic Broadcast Corporation's Native Voice One.

Beyond music, KVSC has a longstanding commitment to news and journalistic programming. Its coverage has included local events like the Minnesota State Fair, interviews with regional artists, and live broadcasts of St. Cloud State University sporting events. Notable programming include An Unbroken Chain, a twelve-part series recounted by Holocaust survivor Henry Oertelt, and the ongoing Untold Stories of Central MN series. The station has also aired special programming produced outside of St. Cloud, including a docudrama focused on the 1920 Duluth lynchings.

Prominent KVSC alumni include Minnesota Twins broadcaster Dick Bremer, Gwen Flanders of USA Today, Jill Riley of 89.3 The Current, and City Pages writer Rob Callahan.

=== Trivia Weekend ===
KVSC's annual Trivia Weekend began in 1980 with 50 teams, originally designed as a way to entertain students in campus residence halls. Co-sponsored during its first two years by the Inter-Residence Hall Association, the inaugural contest ran for 55 hours from March 14–16. The idea originated with IRHA director Mike McMenamin, who previously participated in WWSP's trivia competition. KVSC's sophomore Trivia Weekend was successful enough to help pay for the station's power boost to 5,200 watts, which would allow the competition to reach more potential participants.

Now a signature KVSC tradition, the station began theming their competitions in 1983 for E.T. Trivia (Extraterrestrial Trivia). 1984's Trivia Olympics would be the first contest to clock in at 50 hours. The competition is now held annually in February, an annual occurrence that began with 1987's Trivia Getaway. A record 80 teams participated in 2007's Trivia 28: Around the World in 50 Hours. In April 2020, amid the COVID-19 pandemic, KVSC held an abbreviated online edition titled Trivia 41.5: U Can't Touch This, drawing 102 teams. Starting in 2021, the contest eliminated live question readings between 2 and 6 a.m., replacing them with overnight homework assignments that count towards the final score.

Staffed entirely by volunteers and supported by local sponsors, Trivia Weekend is also KVSC's largest annual alumni event. The competition historically had a house-band, a musical parody group known as the Shake a Hamster Band. The group formed for Trivia Getaway and continued performing for the competition until 2023's Trivia on Trial. Additional original content continues to be made for the contest by The Goat Posse, ranging from parody songs to sketch comedy.

=== Monday Night Live ===
Monday Night Live is KVSC's weekly, hour-long live music show, airing as part of its Monday local music programming block. Launched in 1991, the program features a mix of live performances and artist interviews. Produced by members of KVSC and UTVS during the academic year, the show has showcased a wide range of Minnesota talent - including Semisonic (then performing as Pleasure), Trampled by Turtles, Low, Remo Drive, Motion City Soundtrack, 12 Rods, Cloud Cult, Bad Bad Hats, Charlie Parr, The Soviettes, Dosh, and Durry - along with occasional national acts such as The Dismemberment Plan.

While most episodes are broadcast from KVSC's Stewart Hall studio, Monday Night Live has also taken to the stage at venues like The Pioneer Place on Fifth in downtown St. Cloud and SCSU's Ritsche Auditorium. These special editions have featured artists such as Jonny Lang and Vial performing in front of live audiences.

=== Granite City Radio Theatre ===
Granite City Radio Theatre is an old-time-style radio/theater show that has aired on KVSC since 2012. The variety show, broadcast quarterly, features comedic performances by local actors and live music from house band Collective Unconscious. Past guest performers have included Gary Louris, Jeremy Messersmith, and Dessa.

=== HD Subchannels ===
KVSC broadcasts across four HD subchannels:

- HD-2 simulcasts KVSC's sister station, KVEX-LP (RadioX), which focuses on classic alternative and modern rock.
- HD-3 carries a simulcast of Jazz24, an online jazz station based in Seattle.
- HD-4 simulcasts of KMOJ HD-2 (The Ice), a hip hop format subchannel.

KVSC also shares its studio space with KZYS-LP (Somali Community Radio).

== See also ==
- Campus radio
- List of college radio stations in the United States
