= KFAI =

- Minneapolis, Minnesota; United States
- Broadcast area: Minneapolis-St. Paul
- Frequency: 90.3 MHz (HD Radio)
- Branding: Fresh Air Community Radio

Programming
- Format: Eclectic, free-form, talk, variety
- Subchannels: HD2: FA-2 (Variety)
- Affiliations: AMPERS

Ownership
- Owner: Fresh Air, Inc.

History
- First air date: May 1, 1978; 48 years ago
- Call sign meaning: Fresh Air Inc.

Technical information
- Licensing authority: FCC
- Facility ID: 22630
- Class: A
- ERP: 900 watts
- HAAT: 241 meters (791 ft)
- Transmitter coordinates: 44°58′33.8″N 93°16′21.8″W

Links
- Public license information: Public file; LMS
- Webcast: Listen live
- Website: kfai.org

KFAI (90.3 FM) is a community radio station licensed to Minneapolis, Minnesota, United States, broadcasting to the Twin Cities of Minneapolis–Saint Paul.

The station broadcasts programming for many of the diverse ethnic groups of the region, including a wide variety of music. KFAI has frequently been honored by local media outlets for its variety of spoken-word content and musical diversity (defunct local alternative weekly City Pages often included the station in its annual "Best of the Twin Cities" awards).

KFAI offers weekly public access services through mentorship and resource-sharing. KFAI is a member of Minnesota's AMPERS association. Because KFAI's multi-format programming covers the largest range of identities of the region, it is considered by many to be AMPERS' flagship station. The call sign stands for 'Fresh Air, Inc., the concept of the station and founding nonprofit organization that operates it.

KFAI's studios are located on Riverside Avenue in the Cedar-Riverside neighborhood of Minneapolis' West Bank, while its transmitter is located atop the IDS Center in downtown Minneapolis.

== History ==
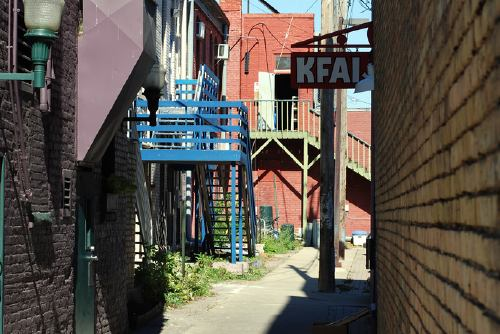
KFAI Studio entrance

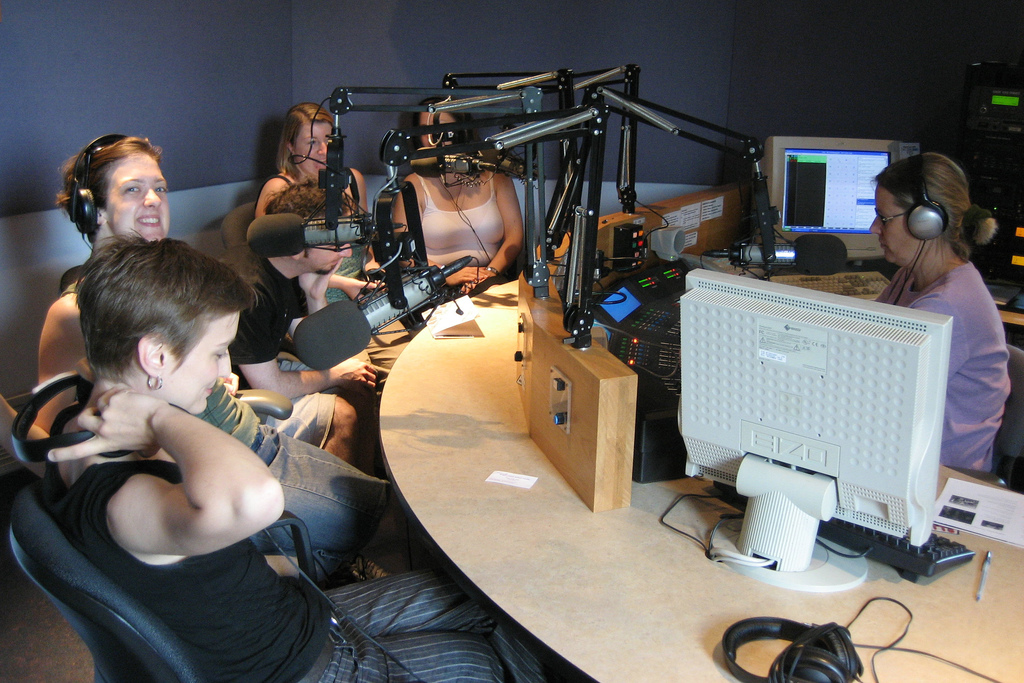
Belfast Poets Touring Group and Jill Anna Ponasik (foreground) on KFAI "Art Matters"

The station went on the air with a 10-watt signal on May 1, 1978, after drawn-out negotiations with the Federal Communications Commission. Its first home was in the belfry of Walker Community Church in South Minneapolis.

In 1984, the transmitter was moved from the roof of the Seward Co-op to the top of the Foshay Tower in downtown Minneapolis and upgraded to 125 watts. The studios moved from the church two years later, relocating to the second floor of Butler Drug store on East Lake Street. In 1991, new studios were built at Cedar-Riverside near the University of Minnesota, where it operates today. A 170-watt West St. Paul translator station was added in 1994 to improve reception on the east side of the metro; it was sold to Hmong Radio Broadcast, LLC in May 2020.

In March 2007, KFAI's main transmitter moved to the IDS Center, after the new owner of the Foshay Tower evicted all tenants when the complex was redeveloped into a hotel. Since November 6, 2007, the station has been operating with an effective radiated power of 900 watts and a height of 247 metres (810 ft) above ground. This upgrade allows the station to have a stronger signal from the IDS Center, which extends the station's coverage deeper into St. Paul and the southeast suburbs.

KFAI's programming is targeted to the Twin Cities core communities. Three other AMPERS stations exist in Minneapolis-St. Paul: KBEM-FM (jazz), KMOJ (urban), and KUOM (college/eclectic). KVSC in St. Cloud, Minnesota, another college station, can also be received by some area residents.

In mid-2010, KFAI changed its weekday programming schedule to an all-news format from 6 to 10 am. The change included the scheduling of The Takeaway, a three-hour syndicated show from Public Radio International (PRI). Some longtime listeners and programmers were upset with the change, charging the station with abandoning its volunteer programming model. The Takeaway was dropped two years later, after PRI announced the decision to reduce it to a one-hour show. In 2017, the station again revamped its programming lineup to become "a different radio station every hour."

Today, KFAI is known for its eclectic entertainment and public affairs programming that features 89 programs in nine languages, with 84 programs produced locally and in-house. Only a handful of programs are produced by outside sources: Democracy Now, Counter Stories and Native Lights (AMPERS), The Conversation with Al McFarlane (Insight News), and rotating features from two area LPFM stations.

== Programming ==
People of color, the LGBTQIA+ community, and many intersectional identities lead more than 50% of the programs on the broadcast schedule, making KFAI one of Minnesota's most culturally, generationally, and socio-economically diverse broadcast media outlets.

KFAI's immediate neighborhood is home to the largest Somali community in the United States and Minnesota's most culturally diverse neighborhood, Cedar-Riverside/West Bank. Beyond the broadcast, KFAI supports community building through developing, hosting, presenting, and sponsoring arts, entertainment, and cultural events across the Twin Cities.

KFAI is home to Fresh Fruit, the longest-running LGBTQIA+ radio program in the nation.

Languages spoken on-air at KFAI include Amharic, Bulgarian, Dari, English, Filipino, French, Oromo, Spanish, Tigrinya, Somali, and Vietnamese.

As a multi-format radio station, KFAI embodies the spirit of eclecticism. For example, one might find a Blues program followed by an hour of news about LGBT issues, or a Reggae program followed by an hour of Somali public affairs programming, and so on. Although programs almost always occupy the same blocks from week to week, programs often have little or no connection to what precedes or follows them.

Some of the station's programming is carried on other radio stations. Crap from the Past, Radio Pocho, and Womenfolk, air on several stations across North America, and one affiliate in New Zealand.

In 2024, KFAI added an HD sub-channel, known as FA-2 (Fresh Air 2). Programming for this sub-channel was previously heard online only.

== Notable personalities ==
- Dale Connelly
- Nicholas David
- Charlie Parr
- Mark Wheat

== See also ==
- List of community radio stations in the United States
