= KSRQ =

- Thief River Falls, Minnesota; United States
- Broadcast area: Thief River Falls/Grand Forks
- Frequency: 90.1 MHz (HD Radio)
- Branding: Pioneer 90.1

Programming
- Format: Community Radio: Variety
- Affiliations: Ampers; Public Radio Exchange

Ownership
- Owner: Northland Community & Technical College

History
- First air date: November 15, 1971
- Former call signs: KAVS (1971–1983)

Technical information
- Class: C3
- ERP: 24,000 watts
- HAAT: 102 meters (335 ft)
- Transmitter coordinates: 48.022°N 96.370°W

Links
- Webcast: Listen Live
- Website: Official Website

KSRQ (90.1 FM) is a 24,000-watt community radio station licensed to Northland Community & Technical College. The station serves the Thief River Falls, Minnesota, area with rimshot coverage in Grand Forks, North Dakota.

Branded as Pioneer 90.1, KSRQ is a member of Minnesota's AMPERS network, an association of 17 independent community stations across the state. The station's program schedule includes a wide variety of programs, including Adult Album Alternative (AAA), Americana, Folk, Country, Classic Rock, Latino, and Polka, among other genres.

In addition to locally- and regionally produced shows hosted by volunteers, the station carries public radio programming distributed by Public Radio Exchange, such as American Routes, eTown, and Folk Alley.

== History ==
10-watt KAVS-FM (89.5) signed on at the Thief River Falls Area Vocational School in 1971, three years after the school's radio announcing program was launched. Regularly scheduled programming began in 1972.

A move to 90.1 FM and a power increase to 1,800 watts followed in 1977. The station's call letters changed to KSRQ in 1983. The station's transmitter was relocated to a taller tower and effective power was increased to 24,000 watts in 1989.

Starting around 2003, the station's management started recruiting community volunteer hosts. In August 2004, the station's format changed from daily segments of country, soft rock, and metal to adult album alternative as "Pioneer 90.1."

== Digital broadcasting ==
Digital broadcasts began in 2009, with the addition of an HD digital signal. Multi-casting of HD-2 and HD-3 signals began in December 2010.

KSRQ HD-2 is the Pioneer PolkaCast, featuring recordings from Minnesota and other Midwestern Polka bands.

KSRQ HD-3 is Neon 90, which features pop, rock, soul, and country music of the late 1950s through 1970s.

As of 2018, Pioneer 90.1 is the only station in northwest Minnesota to offer HD Radio subchannels.
