= Têtes Noires =

All-female rock band from Minneapolis, active 1982–1998

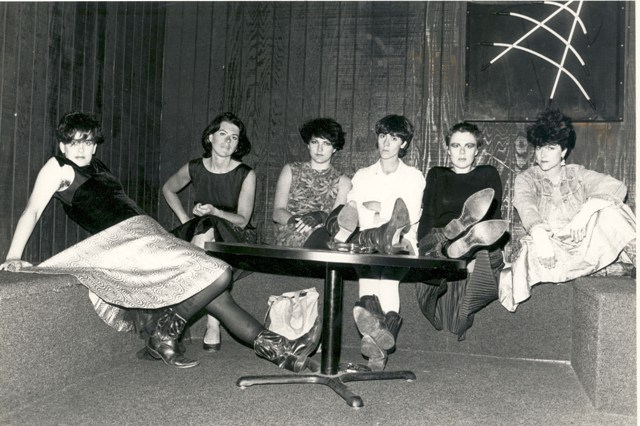
- Left to right, Holt, Alexander, Kayon, Frucci, Bartell and Gage backstage at First Avenue. Photo by Catherine Settanni.

Background information
- Origin: Minneapolis, Minnesota
- Genres: Rock, alternative rock, punk rock, folk rock
- Years active: 1982—1998
- Labels: Rapunzel, Rounder
- Past members: Polly Alexander; Cynthia Bartell; Angela Frucci; Camille Gage; Jennifer Holt; Renée Kayon; Chris Little

Têtes Noires was a rock band from Minneapolis, Minnesota, best known for their "casually mocking" feminist lyrics and for three- and sometimes up to six-part vocal harmonies. Founded by former Miss South Dakota Jennifer Holt, they gave concerts from 1983 until about 1987, and recorded three albums which received positive reviews nationally. As Susan Borey wrote for Spin, the name means "black heads" in French, which they used to describe their hair color (like birds and not a complexion problem).

== Founding and personnel ==
Holt (vocals, violin) formed the band in 1982, as a one-time performance art project. Acceptance and critical acclaim made them a sextet. Along with Holt were: Polly Alexander (guitar), Cynthia Bartell (bass, vocals), Angela Frucci (piano, keyboards), Camille Gage (vocals), and Renée Kayon (percussion, vocals).

They used a 1950s drum machine named "Barbie" until their third album when drummer Chris Little joined. Gage, Holt, and Kayon did lead vocals. Gage and Holt were the primary songwriters. As they explained to a writer for Spin, the band was a self-managed collective: Holt and Gage did public relations, Alexander did the finances, Bartell did record distribution and promotion, Kayon took care of graphics, and Frucci drove their truck.

== Touring ==
Gage said about their first show in 1983 at the Pride Festival in Loring Park, "What we were doing was very unusual. The music was unusual. What was frustrating is that you reach a point where you want people to listen to the music and get past the novelty aspect and pay attention, which I think people do relatively quickly".

The band toured for five years, playing CBGB, Folk City and the Walker Art Center. They played The Bottom Line twice in 1985, once opening for Richard Thompson. At the time, Minneapolis had a healthy indie music scene that included Prince, The Replacements and—booking acts from across the world—the nightclub First Avenue where the band played many times from 1983 through 1986.

== Recordings and critical reaction ==
Critics loved all three albums, and more universally applauded their first two, both self-produced on their own indie label, Rapunzel. Trouser Press thought their second album, American Dream, showed what they could do as songwriters: topics covered included the Unification Church, the American family, world peace and gay murder. They also thought the singers "could blow the Bangles off the map".

The band then worked with Victor DeLorenzo and Brian Ritchie of Violent Femmes who produced their third album. In an interview with The Michigan Daily, Holt explained the addition of a drummer, "the feeling was our music wasn't weird enough to get art grants and yet without a drummer it wasn't accessible enough to a lot of people". Holt said of their song "Bless Me", an "irreverent" look at religious confession, "it's just in fun for us, and that's kind of the way we are ... we like to poke fun at American institutions". A review for iTunes said it, "mixed folk and choral influences with the kind of lighter new wave sound of Blondie and the B-52's" and that:

The problem with the album may not have been that it was too commercial for the group's existing fan base, but that it wasn't commercial enough (or released by a powerful enough marketer). "Dear Jane," for example, was a pop hit waiting to happen; that is, if it could have been produced in an even more pop style and if America were ready to embrace a song about the breakup of apparently gay lovers.

In 2007, Jon Bream, music critic for the Minneapolis Star Tribune, called them the "late, almost-great 1980s arty popsters". Writing during the same year in his book, Music Legends, Martin Keller calls the band "highly influential" and says they paved the way for Babes in Toyland and ZuZu's Petals.

Billboard said in 1985:

Multi-talented, artsy but fun outfits like Têtes Noires can only add to the credibility and stature of women in rock.

John Bush, writing for Allmusic, said their third album, Clay Foot Gods, "proved a disappointment, much more commercial than the first two LPs." Spin said in 1987, however, reviewing the same album:

But don't think Têtes Noires are just a clever cover band skipping through a potpourri of styles; on the contrary, this gang has carved an original sound: stellar harmonies and sharp lyrics tempered with humor.

== Discography ==
- Têtes Noires (Rapunzel) 1983
- American Dream (Rapunzel) 1984
- Clay Foot Gods (Rounder) 1987
- The New American Dream (East Saint Paul Records) 2013
