= AMPERS =

Association of independent community radio stations in Minnesota

Coordinates: 44°57′26″N 93°6′15″W

AMPERS (Association of Minnesota Public Educational Radio Stations) is an association of 18 independent community radio stations in Minnesota. Each station is locally managed and programmed by and for the local community it serves. AMPERS is the largest statewide association of community radio stations in the United States. The stations primarily serve underserved populations including greater Minnesota, diverse communities, and students for a combined audience of about 300,000 listeners. AMPERS has no affiliation with Minnesota Public Radio (MPR) and receives no financial support from MPR. AMPERS is sponsored by the McKnight Foundation, the Minnesota Clean Water, Land & Legacy Amendment, and the Minnesota Department of Public Safety.

== AMPERS Member Stations ==
=== Twin Cities ===
| Station | Frequency | Branding | Location | First broadcast |
|---|---|---|---|---|
| KBEM | 88.5 FM | Jazz 88 | Minneapolis/ St. Paul | 1970 |
| KFAI | 90.3 FM | Fresh Air Radio | Minneapolis/ St. Paul | 1978 |
| KMOJ | 89.9 FM | The People’s Station | Minneapolis/ St. Paul | 1978 |
| KUOM | 770 AM / 100.7 FM / 104.5 FM | Radio K – Real College Radio | Minneapolis/ St. Paul | 1922 |

=== Northern Minnesota ===
| Station | Frequency | Branding | Location | First broadcast |
|---|---|---|---|---|
| KAXE | 91.7 FM / 89.9 FM / 103.9 FM | Authentic Local Radio | Grand Rapids/ Bemidji/Brainerd | 1976 |
| KBXE | 90.5 FM | Authentic Local Radio | Bemidji/ Bagley | 2012 |
| KBFT | 89.9 FM | Bois Forte Tribal Community Radio | Bois Forte/ Nett Lake | 2011 |
| KKWE | 89.9 FM | Niijii Radio | White Earth/ Callaway | 2011 |
| KOJB | 90.1 FM / 105.3 FM | The Eagle | Leech Lake/ Cass Lake | 2011 |
| KSRQ | 90.1 FM | Pioneer 90.1 | Thief River Falls | 1971 |
| WDSE-FM | 103.3 FM | The North 103.3 | Duluth | 1971 |
| WGZS | 89.1 FM | 89.1 Dibiki Giizis – The Moon Radio | Fond du Lac/ Cloquet | 2011 |
| WTIP | 90.7 FM / 89.1 FM / 90.1 FM | North Shore Community Radio | Grand Marais/ Gunflint Trail/ Grand Portage | 1998 |

=== Central Minnesota ===
| Station | Frequency | Branding | Location | First broadcast |
|---|---|---|---|---|
| KUMM | 89.7 FM | The U90 Alternative | Morris | 1972 |
| KVSC | 88.1 FM | Your Sound Alternative | St. Cloud | 1967 |

=== Southern Minnesota ===
| Station | Frequency | Branding | Location | First broadcast |
|---|---|---|---|---|
| KMSU | 89.7 FM | The Maverick | Mankato | 1963 |
| KMSK | 91.3 FM | The Maverick | Austin | 1981 |
| KQAL | 89.5 FM | Your Radio Alternative | Winona | 1975 |
| KRPR | 89.9 FM | Classic Rock Without the Talk | Rochester | 1975 |
