= KMSU =

Public radio station at Minnesota State University, Mankato

- Mankato, Minnesota; United States
- Frequency: 89.7 MHz (HD Radio)
- Branding: "The Maverick"

Programming
- Format: College radio HD-2 Minnesota Music Channel variety HD-3 College radio
- Affiliations: AMPERS

Ownership
- Owner: Minnesota State University, Mankato

History
- First air date: January 7, 1963
- Former frequencies: 90.5 MHz (1963–1982)
- Call sign meaning: "Minnesota State University"

Technical information
- Licensing authority: FCC
- Facility ID: 39790
- Class: C2
- ERP: 17,000 watts
- HAAT: 133 m (436 ft)
- Transmitter coordinates: 44.142°N 94.002°W
- Translator: K220AR (91.9 FM) Albert Lea
- Repeaters: KMSK (91.3 FM) Austin; KMSU-LP 107.9 (HD-3 Mankato)

Links
- Public license information: Public file; LMS
- Website: www.mnsu.edu/kmsu-radio/

KMSU (89.7 FM, "The Maverick") is a radio station operated by Minnesota State University in Mankato, Minnesota, United States, that carries a mixed news, talk, and music format. A repeater station, KMSK (91.3 FM), serves the city of Austin; a translator station, K220AR (91.9 FM), serves the city of Albert Lea. It is part of Minnesota's AMPERS network.

== History ==
Radio activity at MSU Mankato began with an educational broadcasting program called the Radio Workshop for communications students at what was then Mankato State Teachers College. Until 1959, radio shows were broadcast on local commercial station KYSM.

On December 14, 1961, the then-Mankato State College filed to build a 10-watt noncommercial radio station in Mankato, approved for 90.5 MHz on May 17, 1962. The station began broadcasting on January 7, 1963. The studios were located on the fourth floor of the administration building, with the transmitter and antenna on the fourth floor of the D-wing of Crawford Center. It broadcast for eight hours a day, airing classical music and taped educational programs, and was staffed by students who could earn a credit hour for working 12 hours a week at the station. It was said that "on a good day," the station reached St. Peter 10 miles (16 km) away. Broadcasting time slowly extended until KMSU was on the air 18 hours a day by 1973. KMSU became the second-oldest college radio station in the state (and the oldest in the state system), behind KUOM at the University of Minnesota, Twin Cities. The station moved in 1980 from the administration building to the Centennial Student Union.

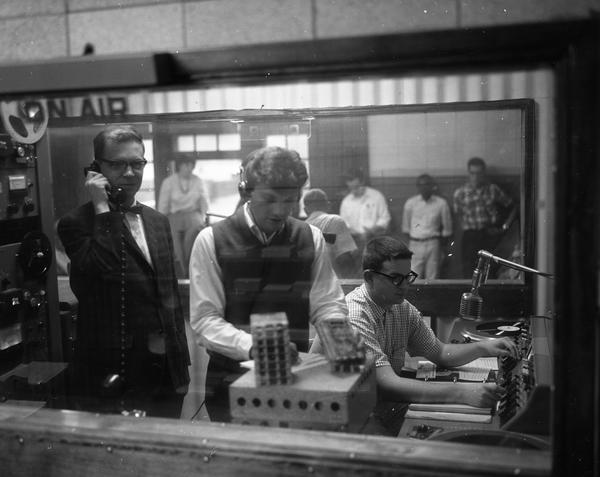
KMSU radio station at Mankato State College 1965-11-05

The late 1970s brought the first threat to the station's existence. A change in policy by the Federal Communications Commission (FCC) left 10-watt noncommercial educational stations like KMSU vulnerable and unprotected against future improvements, which encouraged many to increase power and invest in equipment and facilities. On January 20, 1982, KMSU became a 3,000-watt station on its present frequency of 89.7 MHz, with a $25,000 federal grant helping to defray the costs of the upgrade.

In July 1983, KMSU aligned with National Public Radio (NPR), a change in its orientation, and achieved authorization from the Corporation for Public Broadcasting, which required studio renovations and the first full-time station staff in its history. It also prepared to build translators, including the one at Albert Lea, to extend public radio service. The expanding station moved out of the student union facility, which had become cramped due to the shift from student-run to professional operation, to the Warren Street Building in 1989.

KMSU's future was put at risk again in 1995 due to budget cuts. The university proposed transferring KMSU to Minnesota Public Radio outright, ending student involvement in the station. The university backtracked on the proposal, citing the potential increased value of the facility with the impending Telecommunications Act of 1996, but staffing was cut from five to two full-time employees, so the possibility was raised of dropping NPR programming. During this time, the station had a parallel student-run station on carrier current and cable, known variously as KGMA and KRNR, which offered to take over KMSU. KRNR and KMSU effected a merger of sorts that fall: classical music and NPR programming was dropped for adult album alternative, and several KRNR student programs were added to the KMSU lineup as public radio programming was de-emphasized. News was provided through a student organization, the Southern Minnesota News Project. Allegations of MSU interference in its operations emerged in November 2003 when the university asked for a story to be pulled, with some saying it was because the story was negative to the institution; several checks and balances were added to the news operation.

KMSK in Austin became part of the KMSU family in 1993. It had previously been a separate station, KAVT-FM, from 1981 to 1992 before its owner, Independent School District No. 492, transferred the station to MSU Mankato in exchange for underwriting announcements.

== HD Radio ==
KMSU broadcasts using HD Radio. It has two subchannels beyond the main HD-1 channel, which is the same as the analog signal. The HD-2 channel is known as the Minnesota Music Channel (MMC), carrying a variety format. KMSU's third HD Radio channel, KMSU-HD3, broadcasts the Mav FM student-run radio station. Mav FM features a diverse mix of music, podcasts, and live radio that is entirely curated and produced by students of Minnesota State University, Mankato. Mav FM is also broadcast locally on a low powered station KMSU-LP on 107.9 FM.

== See also ==
- Campus radio
- List of college radio stations in the United States
