= KAXE =

KAXE and KBXE

KAXE: Grand Rapids, Minnesota; KBXE: Bagley, Minnesota; United States
- Frequencies: KAXE: 91.7 MHz; KBXE: 90.5 MHz
- RDS: KAXE: PI: 14FE PS: Program on KAXE RT: Northern Community Radio featuring KAXE and KBXE
- Branding: Northern Community Radio

Programming
- Format: Community and public radio
- Affiliations: NPR, AMPERS

Ownership
- Owner: Northern Community Radio

History
- First air date: KAXE: April 23, 1976; KBXE: March 2012
- Call sign meaning: KAXE: Axe

Technical information
- Licensing authority: FCC
- Facility ID: KAXE: 49540; KBXE: 172756
- Class: KAXE: C1; KBXE: C2
- ERP: KAXE: 100,000 watts; KBXE: 50,000 watts
- HAAT: KAXE: 140 meters (460 ft); KBXE: 123 meters (404 ft)
- Transmitter coordinates: KAXE: 47°15′16.8″N 93°26′3.8″W; KBXE: 47°31′47.8″N 95°13′28″W
- Translator(s): 89.9 K210DR (Brainerd)

Links
- Public license information: KAXE: Public file; LMS; KBXE: Public file; LMS
- Webcast: Listen live
- Website: kaxe.org

KAXE (91.7 FM) is a community licensed public radio station serving Northern Minnesota communities, including Grand Rapids, Brainerd, Bemidji, Virginia, Nisswa, Minnesota Chisholm and Hibbing. The station airs locally produced news, talk, and music programming. It is a member of Ampers, a group of Minnesota public radio stations not affiliated with Minnesota Public Radio. It is a member of National Public Radio, and the only full NPR member in the state that is not an MPR affiliate.

In May 2005, the station moved into a new, larger studio space on the Mississippi River in Grand Rapids (previously, it had been based at Itasca Community College). There is an additional translator in Brainerd (K210DR 89.9 FM).

In March 2012, KAXE added a sister station, KBXE. Licensed to Bagley, KBXE's studios are at 305 America Avenue NW in Bemidji. It broadcasts on a frequency of 90.5 and has a 50,000 watt transmitter. The broadcast tower is west of Bemidji, near Shevlin. KBXE is a fulltime satellite of KAXE.

== Translator ==
Broadcast translator for KAXE
Call sign	Frequency	City of license	FID	ERP (W)	HAAT	Class	FCC info
K210DR	89.9 FM	Brainerd, Minnesota	49541	115	132 m (433 ft)	D	LMS

== See also ==
- List of community radio stations in the United States
