= WTIP =

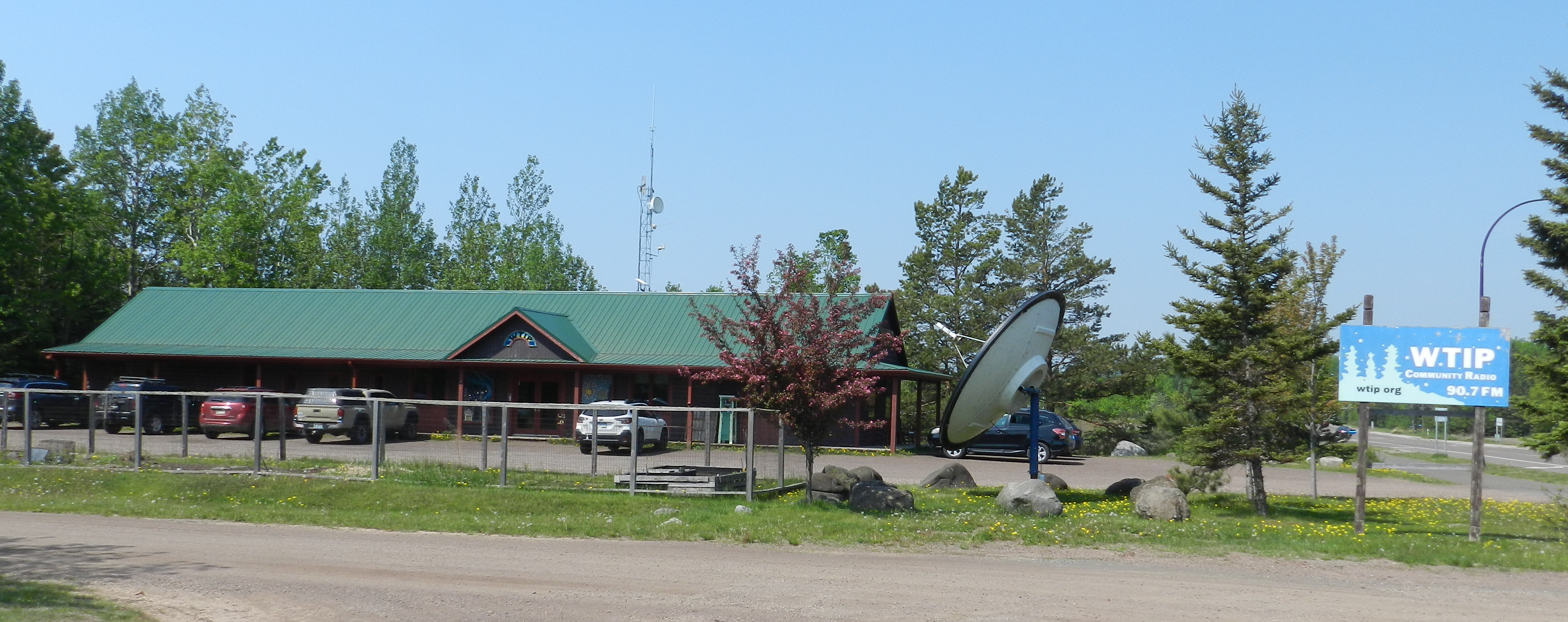
- WTIP station
- Grand Marais, Minnesota; United States
- Broadcast area: Cook County, Minnesota
- Frequency: 90.7 MHz
- Branding: North Shore Community Radio

Programming
- Format: Community-based Public Radio
- Affiliations: AMPERS; Native Voice One

Ownership
- Owner: Cook County Community Radio Corporation

History
- First air date: July 1, 1998

Technical information
- Licensing authority: FCC
- Facility ID: 55568
- Class: C2
- ERP: 25,000 watts
- HAAT: 178 meters (584 ft)
- Transmitter coordinates: 47°46′9.0″N 90°20′49.0″W

Links
- Public license information: Public file; LMS
- Webcast: Listen live
- Website: www.wtip.org

WTIP is a Community-based public radio formatted broadcast radio station licensed to Grand Marais, Minnesota, serving Cook County, Minnesota. WTIP is owned and operated by Cook County Community Radio Corporation.

== Full power translators ==
In addition to the main station, WTIP is relayed by two full power translators to widen its broadcast area and cover all of Cook County, Minnesota.

Call sign	Frequency	City of license	FID	ERP (W)	Class	FCC info
WGPO	90.1 FM	Grand Portage, Minnesota	174256	1,000	A	LMS
WKEK	89.1 FM	Gunflint Lake, Minnesota	176648	1,000	A	LMS

== See also ==
- List of community radio stations in the United States
