= KBEM-FM =

Coordinates: 44.998°N 93.189°W

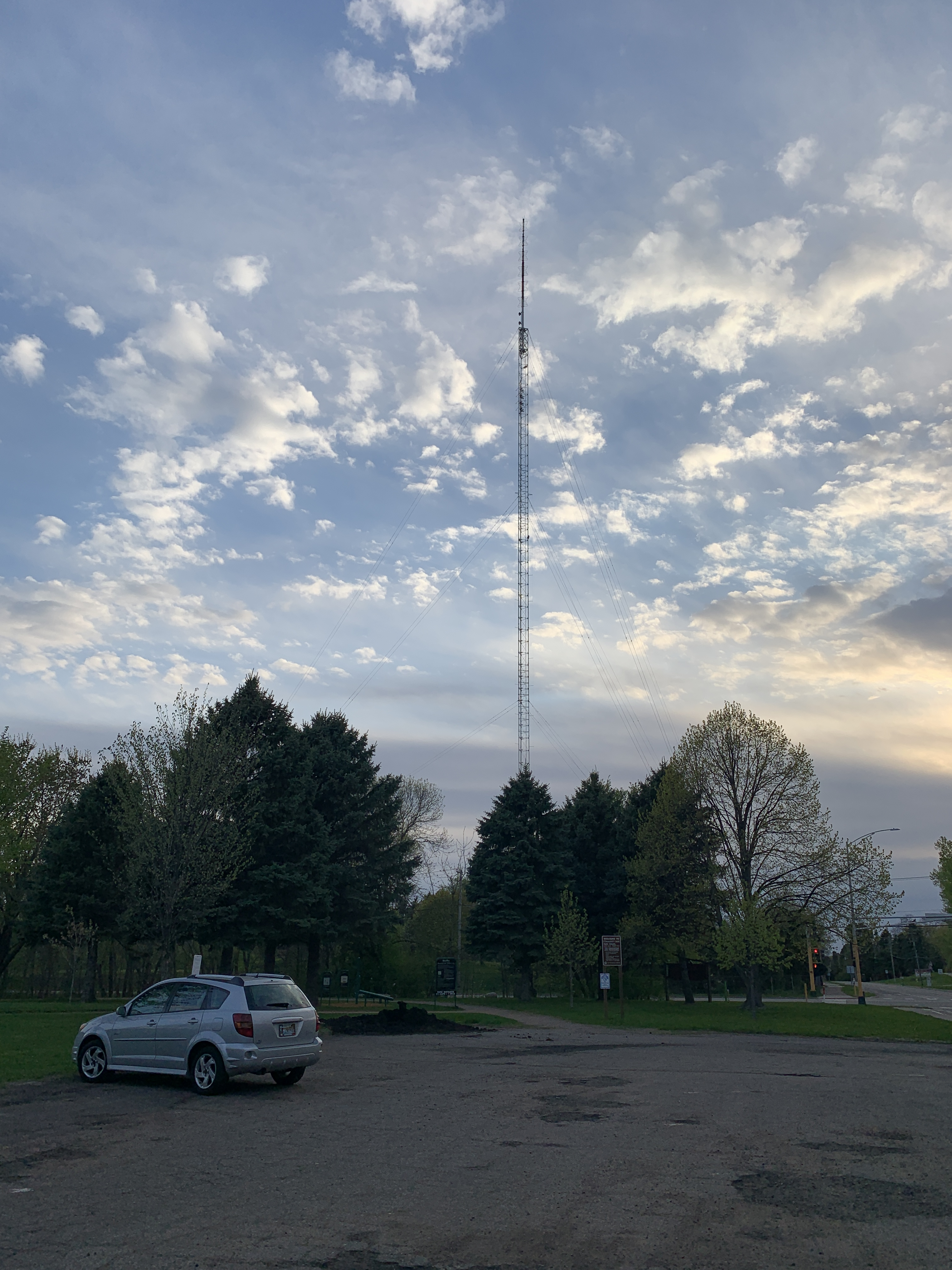
- KBEM-FM antenna on the KUOM tower
- Minneapolis, Minnesota; United States
- Broadcast area: Minneapolis-St. Paul
- Frequency: 88.5 MHz
- Branding: Jazz88

Programming
- Format: Jazz
- Affiliations: AMPERS

Ownership
- Owner: Minneapolis Public Schools

History
- First air date: October 1970
- Call sign meaning: Board of Education Minneapolis

Technical information
- Licensing authority: FCC
- Facility ID: 4275
- Class: A
- ERP: 2,900 watts
- HAAT: 146 m (479 ft)

Links
- Public license information: Public file; LMS
- Webcast: Listen Live
- Website: jazz88.fm

KBEM-FM (88.5 FM, "Jazz88") is a public radio station broadcasting a jazz format based in Minneapolis, Minnesota, United States, the station serves the Minneapolis-St. Paul area. The station is operated by the Minneapolis Public Schools system and has been partnering since 1989 with the Minnesota Department of Transportation (Mn/DOT), providing traffic congestion reports for commuters in the Minneapolis-St. Paul metropolitan area. KBEM also broadcasts live headliner performances from the Twin Cities Jazz Festival each June. KBEM is a member of Minnesota's AMPERS network.

KBEM's studios are located on James Avenue North in Minneapolis, while its transmitter is located off Roselawn Avenue North in Falcon Heights near Roseville.

== History ==
KBEM first took to the air in October 1970. Its broadcast studios were originally in Vocational High School in downtown Minneapolis (since converted to an office building) and has, since 1983, been located at North Community High School. The current jazz format began in 1985. Students assist with the station's operations during the day, delivering news reports and other programming. Minneapolis School Board meetings and Minneapolis City Council meetings were carried live for over 20 years.

Graduates of KBEM's broadcast instructional program have gone on to work at WCCO, KQRS-FM, KFAI, Minnesota Public Radio, KDWB, KTCZ, KPCC in Los Angeles, KQED in San Francisco, Sirius Satellite Radio, XM Satellite Radio, WHYI in Miami, WWZZ in Washington, D.C., KHMX in Houston and other media such as the Star Tribune and City Pages.

Minnesota Public Radio had attempted to purchase the station in 1979 as part of an attempt to split its growing network into classical music and talk radio components, but the deal fell through. Instead, the organization acquired WLOL 1330 AM in 1980. A decade later, it purchased WLOL 99.5 FM (now KSJN).

In late 2004, it was announced that Mn/DOT would be cutting its funding of the station as a cost-saving measure. This funding amounted to $418,000 annually at the time, although the contract extended until March 2005. The money accounted for roughly half of the station's budget, so KBEM launched an emergency fundraising drive. By January 2005, the drive had gathered $45,000 from the public toward a goal of $138,000 to cover the station until the end of its fiscal year (mid-2005). The school system hoped to roughly double membership from 4,000 to 8,000. In a surprise move, Clear Channel Communications donated $25,000 to the station and ran fundraising announcements on the company's local stations, including Cities 97 and its former smooth jazz outlet KJZI (now KFXN-FM). Sufficient public opposition to the proposed end of the MnDOT partnership caused the agency to continue the relationship, but at a reduced rate. KBEM is the only all-jazz radio station in the Twin Cities.

== See also ==
- List of jazz radio stations in the United States
