= KMOJ =

Coordinates: 45.069°N 93.176°W

- Minneapolis, Minnesota; United States
- Broadcast area: Minneapolis-St. Paul
- Frequency: 89.9 MHz (HD Radio)
- Branding: 89.9 KMOJ

Programming
- Format: Community radio; urban adult contemporary
- Subchannels: HD2: The Ice (hip hop); HD3: Simulcast of KVSC
- Affiliations: AMPERS

Ownership
- Owner: Center for Communication and Development

History
- First air date: September 15, 1978; 47 years ago
- Former frequencies: 89.7 MHz
- Call sign meaning: Derived from umoja (Swahili for unity)

Technical information
- Licensing authority: FCC
- Facility ID: 14679
- Class: C3
- ERP: 6,200 watts
- HAAT: 120 m (394 ft)

Links
- Public license information: Public file; LMS
- Webcast: Listen live
- Website: kmojfm.com

KMOJ (89.9 MHz) is a community-oriented noncommercial FM radio station in Minneapolis, Minnesota, airing hip-hop and R&B in an urban adult contemporary radio format. KMOJ's radio studios are on West Broadway Avenue in Minneapolis, and its transmitter is in Arden Hills.

KMOJ features soul, blues, urban gospel, reggae, jazz, hip-hop, spoken word, and talk shows aimed at African American listeners. It is owned and operated by the nonprofit Center for Communications and Development (CCD), on Minneapolis's north side. KMOJ is a member of AMPERS, Minnesota's independent public radio network.

== History ==
KMOJ began in 1976 as WMOJ, a very low-power AM station at 1200 kHz that reached only a few blocks from its studios and transmitter in the Sumner-Olson and Glenwood-Lyndale public housing developments. The station expanded its reach with a move to FM in September 1978, becoming KMOJ at 89.7 FM with 10 watts of power from its transmitter and antenna atop a residential high-rise near its studios at 810 5th Avenue North. A frequency change to 89.9 in 1984 was necessitated for a power increase to 1,000 watts; the transmitter site remained the same. In 1985, the studio moved to a newly built facility in an existing building across the street at 501 Bryant Avenue North.

KMOJ moved from its Girard Terrace studios in January 2007 after severe structural damage was discovered and the building was condemned and subsequently razed. The studios moved to a temporary location in the Uptown area of Minneapolis in March 2007 until a permanent location could be established. The station worked with the City of Minneapolis and moved to a building at West Broadway and Penn Avenue in 2010.

In 2011, KMOJ moved its transmitting facility from its longtime original site to a new facility in the northern suburb of Arden Hills and increased power to 6,200 watts. The old transmitter was given to a radio station in Nigeria on the same frequency.

KMOJ on-air personality Walter “Q Bear” Banks was officially recognized by Minneapolis city mayor Jacob Frey for his community organizing and involvement on February 17 2020, which Frey officially proclaimed as “Walter ‘Q Bear’ Banks Day”. Freddie Bell, the general manager of KMOJ and chairman of AMPERS, was inducted into the Minnesota Broadcasters Hall of Fame in 2022. Walter “Q Bear” Banks was also named to the Hall of Fame in 2024.

In 2025, KMOJ announced a fundraising campaign to construct a new location on purchased land in North Minneapolis, as the Broadway and Penn location is in the path of the proposed Metro Blue Line Extension.

== HD Radio ==
KMOJ broadcasts its signal in HD Radio, and has two HD sub-channels. Its HD2 channel carries a hip hop format branded as "The Ice", while its HD3 channel carries KVSC, a college radio station from St. Cloud State University.

== See also ==
- List of community radio stations in the United States
