= History of Somalis in Minneapolis–Saint Paul =

The Somali population in Hennepin and Ramsey Counties, MN, with Minneapolis and St. Paul highlighted in red.

Somalis are an ethnic group in the Minneapolis–Saint Paul metropolitan area that makes up the largest Somali diaspora in the United States. In 2018, approximately 43,000 people born in Somalia were living in Minnesota (0.77% of the population), and approximately 94,000 Minnesotans spoke the Somali language at home.

== History ==
In the early 1990s, ethnic Somalis first emigrated to the Twin Cities in the United States after the start of the civil war in Somalia, or from other parts of Greater Somalia. Many of the newer arrivals moved to Minnesota through voluntary agencies (VOLAGS), such as Lutheran Social Services of Minnesota and Catholic Charities. Somalis who arrived earlier assisted the more recent immigrants. Minnesota offered decent entry level jobs in meatpacking which employed many of the early Somali migrants.

According to the Minnesota Department of Health, 23,915 refugees arrived in Minnesota from Somalia between 1979 and 2017. The Minnesota Department of Human Services recorded 13,582 Somali refugees arriving between 2005 and 2018. In 2024, Minnesota recorded 1,267 arrivals from Somalia. Secondary migration from other U.S. states has also been a large source of population growth. Between 2010 and 2016, Minnesota received 3,740 documented secondary arrivals, primarily from New York and Texas, settling mainly in Hennepin, Stearns, and Kandiyohi counties.

Somalis in the Twin Cities and elsewhere in the United States often send resources to their extended families abroad, remittances that were facilitated by the signing of the Money Remittances Improvement Act. Following a greatly improved security situation in Somalia in 2012, many Somali U.S. residents have also begun returning to Mogadishu and other parts of the country. A few of the homeward-bound immigrants along with some American-born associates have been sought and/or prosecuted for allegedly providing material support to the Al-Shabaab and Islamic State political militant groups.

By late 2013, fewer expatriates were joining the groups' ranks, according to intelligence officials. Most of the returnees have instead repatriated for investment opportunities and to take part in the ongoing post-conflict reconstruction process in Somalia. Participating in the renovation of schools, hospitals, roads and other infrastructure, they have played a leading role in the capital's recovery and have also helped propel the local real estate market.

Feeding Our Future was a Minnesota nonprofit founded in 2016 which purported to distribute meals to schoolchildren, particularly during the COVID-19 pandemic. The organization was shut down following FBI raids and federal indictments in 2022 which accused it of systemic fraud. Most, though not all, of those charged and convicted in the case were members of the Twin Cities' Somali American community. Aimee Bock, the leader of Feeding our Future and a white woman, accused state agencies of discrimination against the Somali community. Hamse Warfa, a Somali American former state and federal official, wrote in the Star Tribune that the case should not be used to scapegoat the entire community.

Several years after the first charges were brought, the Feeding Our Future case was cited by President Donald Trump as a reason to cut off temporary protected status for some Somali refugees in Minnesota. Trump's administration launched an immigration operation in Minnesota in late 2025 targeting the Somali American community, Operation Metro Surge. Despite thousands of arrests in the operation, few were of Somali Americans, and no detainees had ties to Feeding Our Future or other fraud under investigation. Despite this, many US citizens of Somali descent were targeted by harassment or temporary detention by immigration agents during the operation, leading them to file suit in federal court. Businesses owned by Somali-Americans suffered from external harassment and reduced traffic as members of the community attempted to avoid targeting by federal agents. The Somali community also participated extensively in grassroots organizing and activism opposing Operation Metro Surge, alongside other Minnesotans.

== Demographics ==
In early 2016, the Minnesota Demographers Office estimated that there were between 40,200 and 52,400 Somalis in Minnesota. Some from the Somali community put the number as high as 80,000. These estimates include people born in Somalia, and those of Somali descent.

Somalis in Minnesota reside throughout the Twin Cities metropolitan area and the surrounding towns. Many Somalis inhabit Minneapolis' Cedar-Riverside neighborhood, particularly newly arrived immigrants. Some Somali professionals move to the suburbs to raise their children away from the inner city. Although Somalis have established ethnic enclaves, there is an easy commute between Somali areas and the wider metropolis.

Cities in Minnesota by percent Somali in 2020
City	Count	Percent of total city
Waite Park	1,590	19.1%
Pelican Rapids	359	13.9%
St. Cloud	7,515	10.9%
Faribault	2,328	9.5%
Willmar	1,991	9.5%
Columbia Heights	1,942	8.8%
Hopkins	1,269	6.7%
Minneapolis	26,082	6.1%
Burnsville	3,809	5.9%
Hilltop	56	5.8%
East Grand Forks	469	5.1%
Savage	1,416	4.4%

== Commerce ==
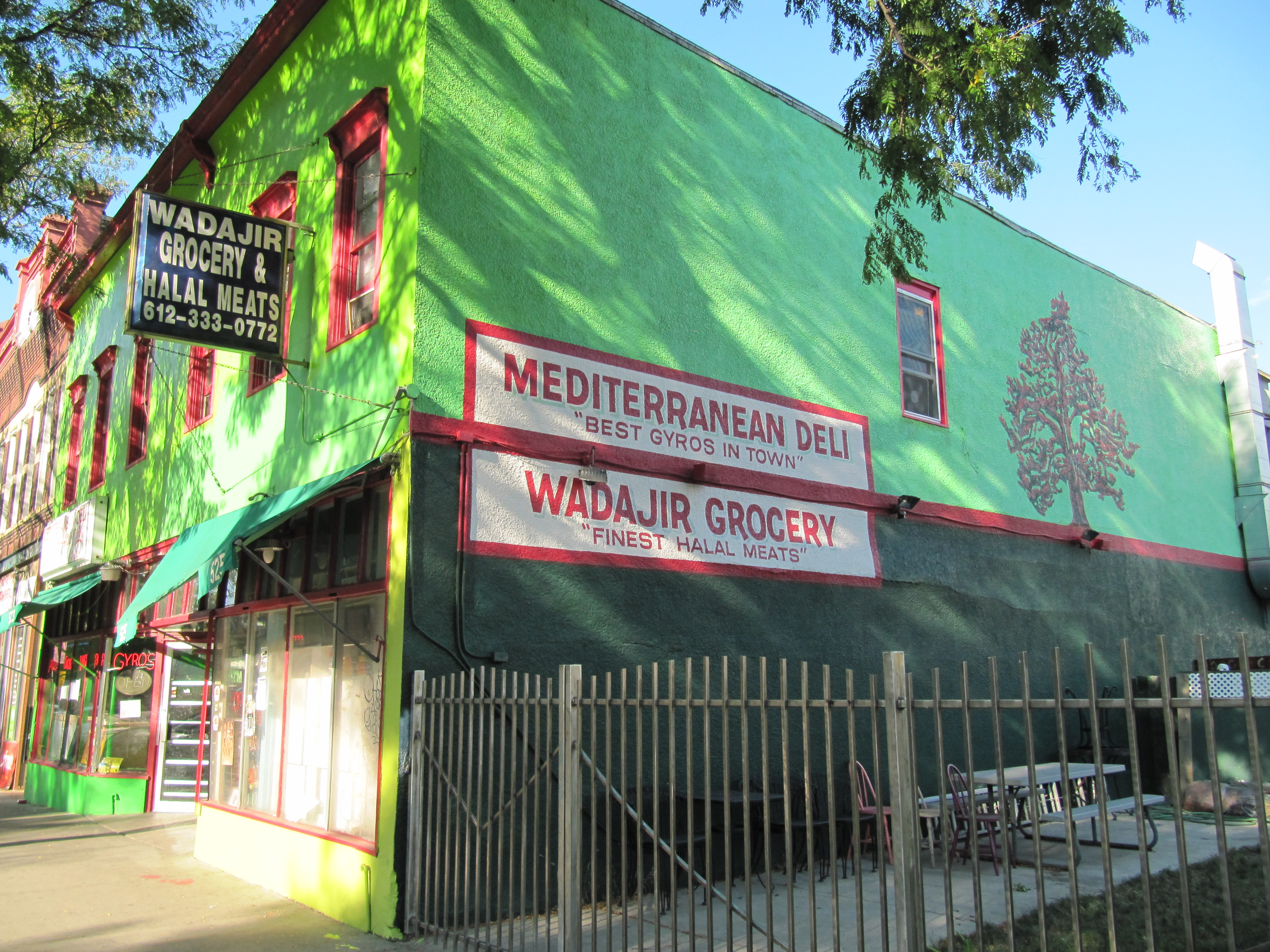
A Somali grocery store in Minneapolis.

Somalis in Minnesota have established many community enterprises. In 2006, they accounted for $164–$494 million in purchasing power and owned 600 businesses. Minneapolis hosts hundreds of Somali-owned and operated commercial ventures.

Stalls inside several Somali shopping malls, such as the Karmel Mall, offer halal meat, leather shoes, clothing for men and women, gold jewelry, money transfer or hawala offices, banners advertising Somali films, video rental stores, groceries, and boutiques.

Workplaces in Minnesota have grown more culturally sensitive and accommodating of differing religious traditions. In 2018, Minneapolis officials named a new, innovative shared-use pathway near downtown Samatar Crossing, in recognition of the Somalia-born Hussein Samatar's many civic contributions to Minneapolis.

== Community organizations ==
The Somali community in Minnesota is represented by Somali-run organizations. Among these are the Confederation of Somali Community in Minnesota (CSCM) and Somali American Parent Association (SAPA), which offer social services to the state's resident Somalis. The Somali community organizations provide ESL classes, job finding, legal advocacy and union services to their constituents.

In October 2014, Minneapolis became the sister city of Bosaso, the third-largest city in Somalia.

== Politics ==
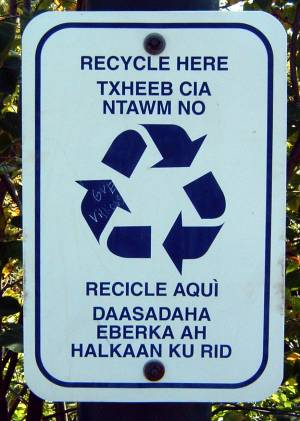
A recycling sign in Minnesota with instructions in English, Hmong, Spanish, and Somali.

Politically, a Somali American Caucus in the Minnesota Democratic–Farmer–Labor Party (DFL) was formed to represent the Somali community. In 2012, a Somali American chaired the Republican Party's Immigrant Relations Committee in Minnesota.

In August 2018, Ilhan Omar won the Democratic primary for Minnesota's 5th congressional district. In November 2018, she was elected to the US House of Representatives, becoming the first Somali-American elected to Congress.

Even though the Somali American community has heavily leaned Democratic, support for the party has declined significantly between 2020 and 2024. In 2020, Biden won 91% of votes in Cedar-Riverside. While Kamala Harris still won a majority of votes in the same precinct in 2024, her support dropped by 14 percentage points compared to that of Biden. Much of the Somali decline in support for the Democratic Party has been attributed to the party's more liberal stances on family and cultural values such as gender identity and LGBTQ+ issues, as well as Biden's handling of the Gaza war.

== Notable residents ==
- Abdirizak Haji Hussein (1924–2014), former Prime Minister of Somalia (1964–1968)
- Abdi Warsame (born 1978), member of the Minneapolis City Council
- Abdirizak Bihi, social activist
- Anisa Hajimumin (born 1978), Minister of Women & Family Affairs of Puntland (2014–2015)
- Fathia Absie, broadcaster, writer and filmmaker
- Nuruddin Farah (born 1945), writer
- Saado Ali Warsame (1950–2014), singer-songwriter
- Sahra Noor, social activist and entrepreneur
- Ilhan Omar (born 1982), member of United States House of Representatives
- Isra Hirsi (born 2003), climate change activist
- Hussein Samatar, politician, banker and community organizer
- Mohamud Noor (born 1977 or 1978), member of the Minnesota House of Representatives
- Hamse Warfa, politician and businessman
- Hodan Hassan (born 1982), member of the Minnesota House of Representatives
- Samakab Hussein (born 1980), member of the Minnesota House of Representatives
- Anquam Mahamoud (born 1989), member of the Minnesota House of Representatives
- Omar Fateh (born 1990), member of the Minnesota Senate and former candidate for mayor of Minneapolis

== See also ==
- Little Somalia
- 2020s Minnesota fraud scandals
- Somali Civil War
- Religion in Minnesota
- History of the Hmong in Minneapolis–Saint Paul
