= Somali Institute for Peace and Justice in Minneapolis =

US-based non-profit organization

The Somali Institute for Peace and Justice in Minneapolis (SIPJ) was a nonprofit organization based in Minneapolis, Minnesota. Formed in October 2006, it advocated political unity and the institution of Islamic law in Somalia. The organization had branches in the United States, Canada and the United Kingdom. Hassan Mohamud served as the organization's President, and Abdulqadir Abdi as its Vice Chairman.

== Support for the Islamic Courts Union ==
SIPJ issued a press release on 19 September 2006 stating "strong and unequivocal" opposition to the African Union peacekeeping force's presence in Somalia, a force that the AU deployed in response to the Islamic Courts Union's attacks on the Transitional Government. SIPJ described the deployment as needless and reckless, suggesting that the Ethiopian government used "manipulation" to control the "weak" and "subservient" Transitional Government.

At the same time the SIPJ applauded the ICU's "extraordinary achievement on bringing peace and stability" to Somalia.

In an earlier press release, released on 28 November, the SIPJ said the "Islamic Courts [Union] accomplished miracles to pacify and stabilize much of southern Somalia. Such an accomplishment must be congratulated and not be disturbed."

== Core Advisory Board of SIPJ ==
- Abdulkadir Shaair Ato
- Mohamed Aden Tiiceey
- Nuur Farah
- Mohamed Hassan Gudbaaye
- Warsame Ali Warsame
- Hussein Warsame
- Abdulrahman Jaahweyn
- Abdulkadir Jama
- Ismail Gorse
- Farhan Hussein
- Salah Warsame
- Gandi Abdi Kadiye
- Dr. Abdulkadir Dahir
- Mohamud Abdulle
- Afrah Abdullahi
- Sh. Hassan Mohamud, J.D.
- Hassan Mohamud

== See also ==
- History of the Somalis in Minneapolis–Saint Paul
