= List of U.S. states and territories by religiosity =

The degree of religiosity in the population of the United States can be compared to that in other countries and compared state-by-state, based on individual self-assessment and polling data.

== United States ==
Religious groups in the USA by year
Religion	2007	2014	2023–2024
Christian	78%	71%	62%
Evangelical Protestant	26%	25%	23%
Mainline Protestant	18%	15%	11%
Historical Black Protestant	7%	6%	5%
Catholic	24%	21%	19%
Latter-Day Saints	2%	2%	2%
Orthodox Christian	1%	<1%	1%
Jehovah's Witness	1%	1%	<1%
Other Christian	<1%	<1%	1%
Other religions	5%	6%	7%
Jewish	2%	2%	2%
Muslim	<1%	1%	1%
Buddhist	1%	1%	1%
Hindu	<1%	1%	1%
Other world religions	<1%	<1%	<1%
Something else	1%	2%	2%
Religious unaffiliated	16%	23%	29%
Atheist	2%	3%	5%
Agnostic	2%	4%	6%
Nothing in particular	12%	16%	19%

== Methodologies ==
The Gallup Poll assesses religiosity around the world, asking "Is religion important in your daily life?" and in the United States by state, asking the degree to which respondents consider themselves to be religious. The Pew Research Center and Public Religion Research Institute have conducted studies of reported frequency of attendance to religious service. The Harris Poll has conducted surveys of the percentage of people who believe in God.

== Results ==
=== Religious denominations (Pew Research 2014) ===
Religion in the United States by state and the District of Columbia (2014)
Region	Net religious (%)	Protestant (%)	Catholic (%)	Latter-day Saint (%)	Other Christian (%)	Other (%)	Irreligious (%)	Don't know (%)	Reference
Mississippi	89	79	4	1	<1	2	10	1	
Alabama	87	80	7	1	<1	1	12	1	
Louisiana	86	58	26	<1	2	2	13	1	
Tennessee	85	77	6	1	1	3	14	1	
South Dakota	82	58	22	<1	<1	3	18	<1	
Texas	82	50	23	1	2	4	18	<1	
Arkansas	81	75	8	1	<1	3	18	1	
(Georgia (U.S. state)) Georgia	81	70	9	1	2	3	18	1	
New Jersey	81	31	34	1	2	14	18	1	
Oklahoma	81	70	8	1	<1	2	18	1	
West Virginia	81	73	6	2	<1	3	18	1	
Kansas	80	58	18	1	1	4	20	<1	
Nebraska	80	53	23	1	<1	4	20	<1	
North Dakota	80	52	26	<1	<1	3	20	<1	
South Carolina	80	68	10	1	2	3	19	1	
Virginia	80	59	12	2	1	6	20	<1	
Missouri	79	60	16	1	<1	3	20	1	
New Mexico	79	38	34	2	1	4	21	<1	
North Carolina	79	69	9	1	2	3	20	1	
Rhode Island	79	30	42	1	2	5	20	1	
Iowa	78	65	18	<1	<1	1	21	1	
Minnesota	78	50	22	1	<1	5	20	2	
Ohio	78	55	18	1	1	4	22	<1	
Pennsylvania	78	47	24	<1	1	6	21	1	
Illinois	77	43	28	<1	2	6	22	1	
Kentucky	77	67	10	<1	<1	2	22	1	
Maryland	77	54	15	1	2	8	23	<1	
Utah	77	13	5	55	<1	4	22	1	
United States	76.6	46.5	20.8	1.6	1.7	5.9	22.8	0.6	
Connecticut	76	35	33	1	2	7	23	1	
Delaware	76	46	22	<1	1	6	23	1	
Florida	76	46	21	1	2	6	24	<1	
Michigan	75	54	18	<1	2	5	24	1	
Wisconsin	75	44	25	<1	2	4	25	<1	
(Washington, D.C.) District of Columbia	74	41	20	2	1	9	25	1	
Indiana	74	55	18	1	<1	2	26	<1	
Wyoming	74	43	14	9	4	3	26	<1	
Arizona	73	39	21	5	1	6	27	<1	
Hawaii	73	38	20	3	2	10	26	1	
Idaho	73	37	10	19	1	4	27	<1	
California	72	32	28	1	3	9	27	1	
(New York (state)) New York	72	26	31	<1	2	12	27	1	
Nevada	71	35	25	4	2	5	28	1	
Montana	70	42	17	4	2	5	30	<1	
Colorado	69	43	16	2	2	5	29	2	
Alaska	68	37	16	5	5	6	31	1	
Oregon	68	43	12	4	2	7	31	1	
Maine	67	37	21	2	1	7	31	2	
Massachusetts	67	21	34	1	1	9	32	1	
(Washington (state)) Washington	67	40	17	3	3	6	32	1	
New Hampshire	64	30	26	1	2	5	36	<1	
Vermont	61	30	22	<1	1	8	37	2	

==== Religions by metropolitan areas ====
Religion in major U.S metropolitan areas (2014)
Metro area	Net religious (%)	Total Christian (%)	Evangelical Protestant (%)	Mainline Protestant (%)	Historically Black Protestant (%)	Catholic (%)	Latter-day Saint (%)	Other (%)	None (%)
Dallas	82	78	38	14	7	15	1	4	18
Atlanta	80	76	33	12	18	11	1	3	20
Houston	80	73	30	11	9	19	1	4	20
Miami	79	68	20	11	8	27	<1	10	21
Chicago	78	71	16	11	8	34	<1	7	22
Minneapolis	77	70	15	27	4	21	1	5	23
Detroit	76	67	20	14	15	16	<1	8	24
New York City	76	59	9	8	6	33	<1	16	24
Philadelphia	76	68	13	17	11	26	<1	8	24
Washington, D.C.	76	65	14	15	12	19	1	10	24
Los Angeles	75	65	18	9	3	32	<1	9	25
Riverside, Calif.	75	71	30	10	3	22	3	4	25
Phoenix	74	66	25	11	1	21	6	7	26
San Diego	73	68	14	16	2	32	2	5	27
Boston	67	57	9	13	3	29	<1	10	33
San Francisco	65	48	10	6	4	25	1	15	35
Seattle	63	52	23	10	1	15	1	10	37

=== Attendance ===
Church or synagogue attendance by state in 2009: ≥50% attending weekly 45-49% attending weekly 40-44% attending weekly 35-39% attending weekly / 30-34% attending weekly 25-29% attending weekly 20-24% attending weekly 15-19% attending weekly

A 2013 survey by the Public Religion Research Institute reported that 31% of Americans attend religious services at least weekly. In 2006, a world-wide online Harris Poll surveyed 2,010 U.S. adults and found that 26% of those surveyed attended religious services "every week or more often", 9% went "once or twice a month", 21% went "a few times a year", 3% went "once a year", 22% went "less than once a year", and 18% never attend religious services. A 2013 Harris Poll reported an 8% decline in a belief in God, since a prior 2009 poll.

According to a 2011 Gallup poll, the state with the greatest percentage of respondents identifying as "very religious" was Mississippi (59%), and the state with the smallest percentage were Vermont and New Hampshire (23%), while Florida (39%) and Minnesota (40%) were near the median. A 2014 Pew Research poll found that the states with the greatest percentage of respondents who stated that religion was "very important" or "somewhat important" to their lives were Alabama (90%) and Louisiana (90%), while the state with the smallest percentage was Vermont (57%).

=== U.S. states and Washington, D.C. ===
Religious service attendance by state (2023-2024 survey).
State	At least once a week	Once or twice a month	A few times a year	Seldom/never	No answer
Alabama	34%	9%	19%	37%	1%
Alaska	19%	6%	20%	55%	<1%
Arizona	26%	6%	16%	51%	1%
Arkansas	30%	11%	18%	41%	<1%
California	20%	7%	19%	53%	<1%
Colorado	20%	7%	14%	59%	<1%
Connecticut	17%	6%	18%	59%	<1%
District of Columbia	27%	6%	19%	47%	1%
Delaware	27%	6%	16%	49%	1%
Florida	22%	9%	20%	47%	1%
Georgia	27%	11%	19%	43%	1%
Hawaii	17%	2%	18%	62%	1%
Idaho	34%	7%	9%	51%	<1%
Illinois	25%	8%	19%	47%	1%
Indiana	31%	5%	15%	47%	1%
Iowa	21%	9%	20%	50%	<1%
Kansas	34%	5%	20%	40%	1%
Kentucky	31%	8%	13%	47%	<1%
Louisiana	34%	11%	17%	37%	1%
Maine	16%	2%	12%	69%	1%
Maryland	25%	5%	18%	52%	1%
Massachusetts	14%	6%	17%	63%	<1%
Michigan	24%	9%	15%	52%	1%
Minnesota	21%	11%	20%	47%	<1%
Mississippi	48%	6%	10%	36%	<1%
Missouri	28%	8%	12%	51%	1%
Montana	23%	9%	11%	56%	<1%
Nebraska	27%	11%	19%	43%	1%
Nevada	13%	7%	16%	64%	<1%
New Hampshire	13%	5%	13%	69%	<1%
New Jersey	23%	8%	19%	49%	1%
New Mexico	25%	9%	18%	47%	<1%
New York	18%	8%	23%	50%	1%
North Carolina	30%	9%	18%	42%	1%
North Dakota	25%	18%	16%	39%	2%
Oklahoma	35%	7%	17%	44%	<1%
Ohio	27%	7%	17%	50%	1%
Oregon	15%	4%	12%	68%	<1%
Pennsylvania	22%	6%	19%	53%	<1%
Rhode Island	22%	5%	18%	53%	2%
South Carolina	36%	11%	17%	36%	1%
South Dakota	40%	10%	17%	33%	<1%
Tennessee	36%	8%	13%	41%	2%
Texas	28%	10%	20%	41%	<1%
Wisconsin	22%	7%	16%	53%	<1%
Utah	41%	7%	9%	43%	<1%
Vermont	12%	5%	14%	67%	1%
Virginia	29%	8%	17%	45%	<1%
Washington	20%	7%	12%	60%	1%
West Virginia	24%	6%	19%	49%	2%
Wyoming	23%	10%	12%	55%	<1%

Weekly church attendance by state (Gallup)
State	Percent
Utah	51%
Mississippi	47%
Alabama	46%
Louisiana	46%
Arkansas	45%
South Carolina	42%
Tennessee	42%
Kentucky	41%
North Carolina	40%
Georgia	39%
Texas	39%
Oklahoma	39%
New Mexico	36%
Nebraska	35%
Indiana	35%
Virginia	35%
Delaware	35%
Missouri	35%
Idaho	34%
West Virginia	34%
Arizona	33%
Kansas	33%
Michigan	32%
Ohio	32%
Illinois	32%
North Dakota	32%
Pennsylvania	32%
Iowa	32%
Florida	32%
Maryland	31%
South Dakota	31%
Minnesota	31%
New Jersey	30%
Wisconsin	29%
Rhode Island	28%
Wyoming	28%
California	28%
New York	27%
Nevada	27%
Montana	27%
Alaska	26%
Connecticut	25%
Colorado	25%
Hawaii	25%
Oregon	24%
Washington	24%
District of Columbia	23%
Massachusetts	22%
Maine	20%
New Hampshire	20%
Vermont	17%

The table below displays the results of a 2014 survey by Pew Research:

Degrees of religiosity
State or district	Overall religiosity rank	Believe in God with certainty	Consider religion important	Pray daily	Attend weekly worship services
California	35	54%	47%	51%	31%
Texas	11	69%	63%	63%	42%
Florida	22	64%	53%	56%	35%
New York	43	56%	45%	48%	29%
Illinois	33	61%	50%	51%	34%
Pennsylvania	27	61%	51%	54%	34%
Ohio	17	67%	56%	57%	38%
Georgia	8	74%	64%	64%	42%
Michigan	27	63%	50%	53%	33%
North Carolina	10	73%	62%	66%	39%
New Jersey	19	60%	50%	53%	35%
Virginia	14	67%	60%	60%	44%
Washington	44	55%	44%	46%	30%
Massachusetts	50	40%	33%	37%	23%
Arizona	27	62%	51%	55%	34%
Indiana	22	63%	53%	52%	37%
Tennessee	3	78%	71%	70%	51%
Missouri	15	70%	56%	59%	37%
Maryland	22	64%	50%	51%	31%
Wisconsin	44	56%	44%	46%	27%
Minnesota	35	56%	46%	47%	34%
Colorado	41	55%	47%	50%	30%
South Carolina	5	74%	69%	66%	47%
Alabama	1	82%	77%	73%	51%
Louisiana	4	75%	71%	68%	46%
Kentucky	13	75%	63%	63%	39%
Oregon	39	57%	45%	45%	29%
Oklahoma	8	71%	64%	65%	43%
Connecticut	47	54%	42%	47%	28%
Iowa	19	66%	53%	50%	36%
Mississippi	1	82%	74%	75%	49%
Arkansas	5	77%	70%	65%	41%
Utah	11	61%	58%	61%	53%
Kansas	19	66%	50%	53%	37%
Nevada	35	59%	44%	48%	31%
New Mexico	18	63%	59%	55%	36%
Nebraska	22	66%	54%	52%	39%
West Virginia	7	77%	64%	68%	46%
Idaho	33	62%	51%	50%	35%
Hawaii	41	62%	44%	52%	28%
Maine	48	48%	34%	35%	22%
New Hampshire	50	43%	33%	36%	22%
Rhode Island	35	60%	48%	48%	36%
Montana	39	64%	44%	51%	31%
Delaware	32	61%	46%	49%	34%
South Dakota	16	69%	57%	56%	36%
Alaska	44	55%	41%	49%	30%
North Dakota	27	64%	53%	51%	33%
District of Columbia	27	55%	50%	51%	28%
Vermont	48	41%	32%	33%	21%
Wyoming	22	66%	49%	53%	38%

=== U.S. territories ===
The following is the percentage of Christians and all religions in the U.S. territories as of 2015 (according to the ARDA):

Note that CIA World Factbook data differs from the data below. For example, the CIA World Factbook says that 99.3% of the population in American Samoa is religious.

Territory	Percent religious (all religions)	Percent Christian	Percent religious (non-Christian)	Percent non-religious	Unknown / Unspecified
American Samoa	98.5%	97.37%	1.13%	0.88%	0.62%
Guam	95.4%	91.1%	4.3%	1.8%	2.8%
Northern Mariana Islands	98.85%	81.13%	17.72%	1.11%	0.04%
Puerto Rico	91.53%	91.2%	0.33%	3.16%	5.31%
US Virgin Islands	83.3%	81.83%	1.47%	4.04%	12.66%

== Ethnicity ==
Religious groups by ethnicity, 2023-2024 survey
Religion	White	Hispanic	Black	Asian
Christian	62%	67%	73%	33%
Evangelical Protestant	27%	17%	15%	12%
Mainline Protestant	15%	4%	6%	6%
Historical Black Protestant	<1%	1%	44%	<1%
Catholic	17%	42%	4%	14%
Latter-Day Saints	2%	1%	1%	<1%
Orthodox Christian	1%	<1%	1%	1%
Jehovah's Witness	<1%	1%	1%	<1%
Other Christian	<1%	1%	1%	<1%
Other Religions	6%	5%	4%	32%
Jewish	3%	1%	<1%	<1%
Muslim	1%	1%	2%	6%
Buddhist	<1%	1%	<1%	10%
Hindu	<1%	<1%	<1%	13%
Other world religions	<1%	<1%	<1%	1%
Something else	2%	2%	1%	1%
Religious unaffiliated	31%	27%	22%	33%
Atheist	6%	3%	1%	7%
Agnostic	7%	4%	2%	6%
Nothing in particular	18%	21%	19%	20%

== See also ==
- Bible Belt
- Religion in Minnesota
- Demographics of the United States § Religion
- Freedom of religion in the United States
- Historical religious demographics of the United States
- Religion in the United States
