= Samatar Crossing =

Shared-use path in Minneapolis

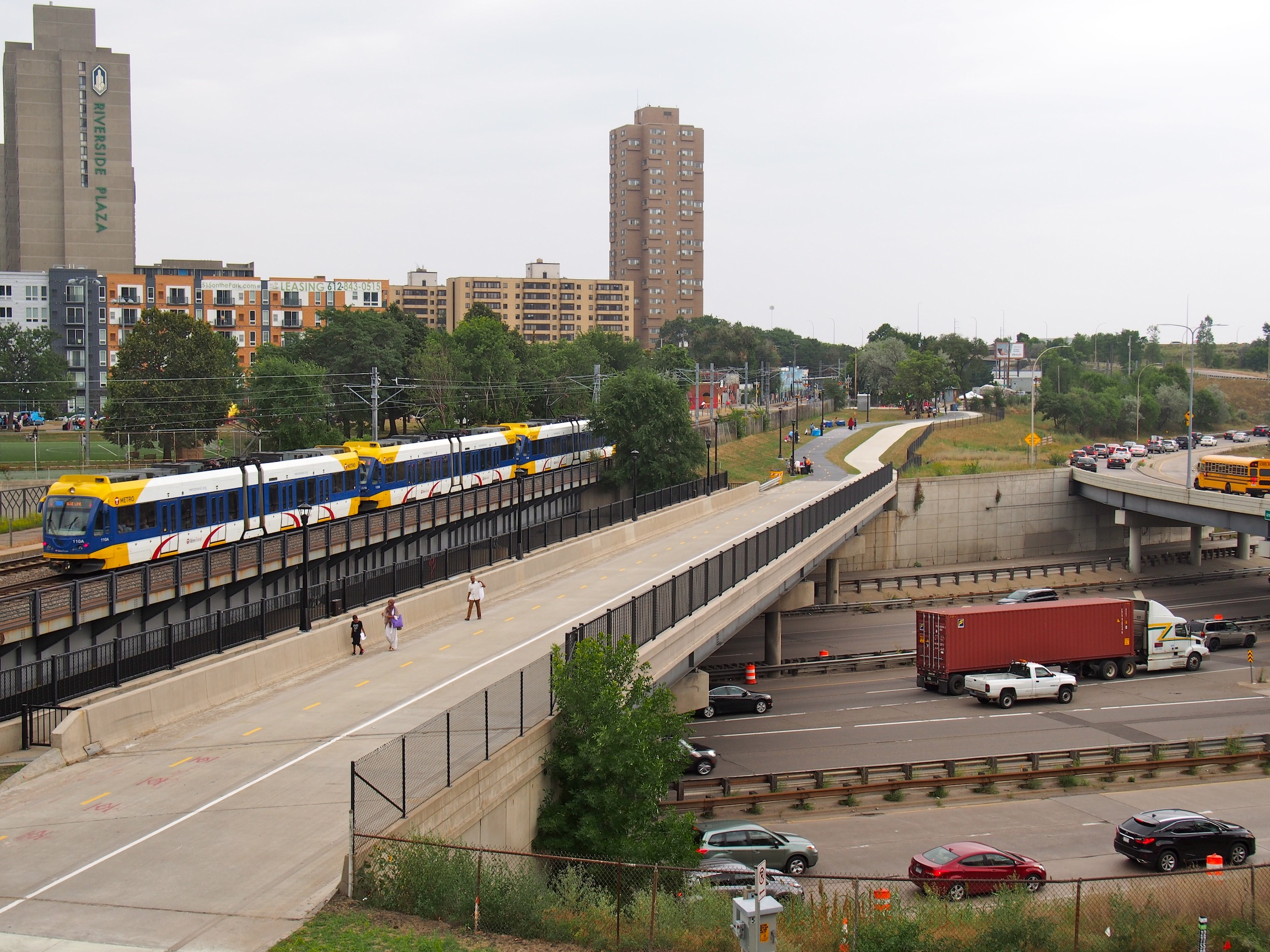
- Samatar Crossing running across Interstate 35W in September 2018, shortly after its opening.

Samatar Crossing
- Length: 1,850 feet (560 m)
- Location: Minneapolis, Minnesota, United States
- Trailheads: 11th Avenue South / South 5th Street (north); 15th Avenue South / South 7th Street (south)
- Use: Cycling; Pedestrians
- Difficulty: Easy
- Season: Year-round
- Sights: City skyline views
- Surface: Concrete and asphalt

Samatar Crossing is a 1,850-foot (560 m), shared-use path and innovative urban redesign project in Minneapolis, Minnesota, United States. Posthumously named after Somali-American politician and activist Hussein Samatar, the crossing connects the Downtown East/Elliot Park and Cedar-Riverside neighborhoods via a former interstate highway ramp. The Samatar Crossing redevelopment project received national recognition when it opened in 2018.

== Route description ==
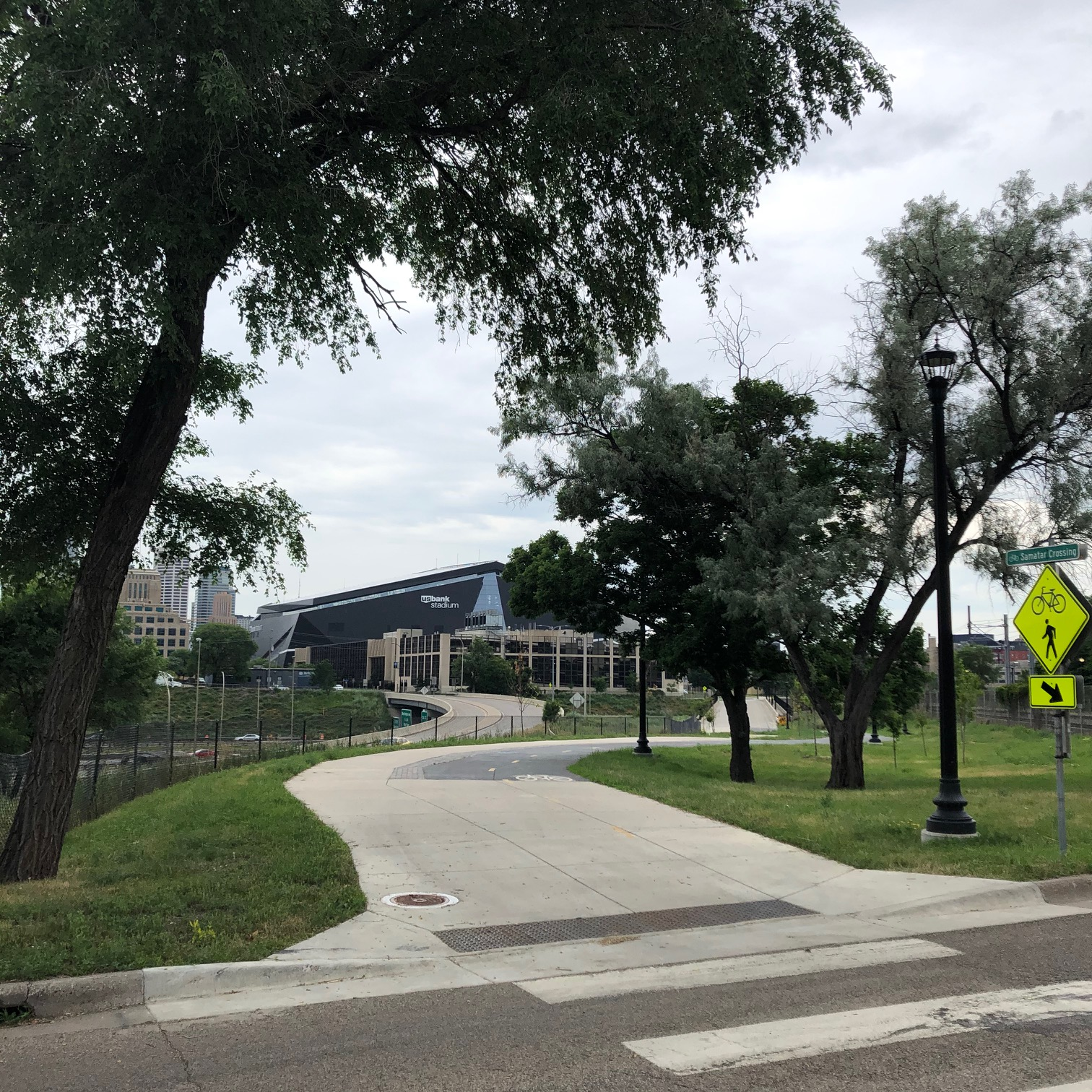
The southern entrance to Samatar Crossing in Minneapolis, June 2020

Samatar Crossing's northern trailhead is at the intersection of 11th Avenue South and South 5th Street, directly across the street from an indoor sports stadium. The path follows the north side of South 5th Street for approximately one block before traversing over several lanes of highway traffic. The path's southern trailhead is at 15th Avenue South and South 7th Street, west of Currie Park and the Metro Blue Line tracks. The parallel Hiawatha LRT Trail is east of the light rail tracks. Some digital mapping services label the Samatar Crossing pathway as "Hiawatha Bridge Detour." Samatar Crossing features separate lanes for pedestrians and cyclists and enhanced lighting. In 2018, the city announced plans to install landscaping and public art along its course.

Nearby sites:

- Downtown East Commons
- Downtown East station
- U.S. Bank Stadium
- Currie Park
- Cedar–Riverside station

== History of the trail ==
The construction of urban freeways in the middle-to-latter half of the 20th century in the United States had a profound impact on neighborhoods. In Minneapolis, the Cedar-Riverside neighborhood was part of a well-connected street grid system early in the 1900s, but by the 1980s freeways surrounded three of its sides, with fourth side cut off by the Mississippi River, isolating the neighborhood from downtown and adjacent communities.

The construction of a new indoor sports stadium in downtown Minneapolis in the 2010s to replace the Metrodome provided an opportunity for change. The new stadium did not have the exact same footprint as the prior stadium. Minneapolis Public Works had to construct a new westbound exit ramp from Interstate 94 to 7th Street to handle vehicle traffic into downtown and the new stadium. That left the city with a decision about how to use the former 5th Street vehicle ramp from Interstate 35W to downtown Minneapolis. In 2013, redevelopment plans pushed by then-Mayor R.T. Rybak would have allowed cars to use the road. After neighborhood residents voiced opposition to that plan, Minneapolis city officials decided to just have a path for bikes and pedestrians.

The significance of Samatar Crossing is that "it gives the neighborhood — the epicenter of the Somali community — direct access to downtown Minneapolis for the first time." It was residents of Cedar-Riverside who prioritized non-motorized connections to downtown and surrounding neighborhoods, resulting in Minneapolis city officials to adopt a different approach. The densely populated Cedar-Riverside area is home to largest immigrant community in Minneapolis. Samatar Crossing serves as a transportation connection, and provides new space for events, gathering, and recreation.

Minneapolis Mayor Jacob Frey, city officials, and community members formally opened Samatar Crossing on August 23, 2018. The trail is named after the late Hussein Samatar, a former Minneapolis School Board member and the first Somali-American elected to public office in Minneapolis, and possibly in the United States. Samatar died in 2013 after battling leukemia. Born in Somalia, he came to Minnesota as a civil war refugee with the first wave of Somali immigrants. He was a successful business leader and Somali-American political pioneer. At the dedication of the crossing in 2018, Minneapolis Councilman Abdi Warsame said, "This (Samatar Crossing) is a testament to who Hussein was. He worked all his life to connect people and to bridge communities and the fact that we are connecting two communities, Cedar-Riverside and downtown, is a testament to his work”

The non-profit, advocacy organization PeopleForBikes named Samatar Crossing as one of the 10 best new bike ways 2018:

10. Minneapolis, Minnesota

Samatar Crossing is a connection between Cedar-Riverside neighborhood and downtown Minneapolis that repurposed a former interstate ramp into a car-free space for people walking and biking. The neighborhood is home to the largest East African immigrant community in Minneapolis, most of whom rely on walking, biking, and taking transit. The neighborhood was dismantled by freeways surrounding it from three sides in the 1960s. The trail restores neighborhood connectivity to jobs, housing, commercial areas, etc. According to Abdullahi Abdulle, Associate Transportation Manager, the trail is posthumously named after Hussein Samatar, the first Somali-American in Minnesota to be elected to public office, winning a Minneapolis Public School Board seat.

Samatar Crossing was featured at the 2018 conference of the National Association of City Transportation Officials for its concept and design.

In 2022 and 2023, the crossing was the location of homeless encampment for about 100 occupants. After a fatal shooting at the encampment on January 12, 2023, the Minnesota Department of Transportation, which owns the property, began the process of closing the encampment.

== See also ==
- List of shared-use paths in Minneapolis
- History of the Somalis in Minneapolis–Saint Paul
- Metro Transit
