= Downtown East =

Downtown East can refer to:

- Downtown East, Minneapolis
  - Downtown East/Metrodome (Metro Transit station), a light rail station in the above neighborhood
- Downtown Eastside, Vancouver
- Downtown East Village, Calgary
- NTUC Downtown East, a lifestyle hub in northeast Singapore
