= Downtown East Commons =

Urban park in Minneapolis, Minnesota

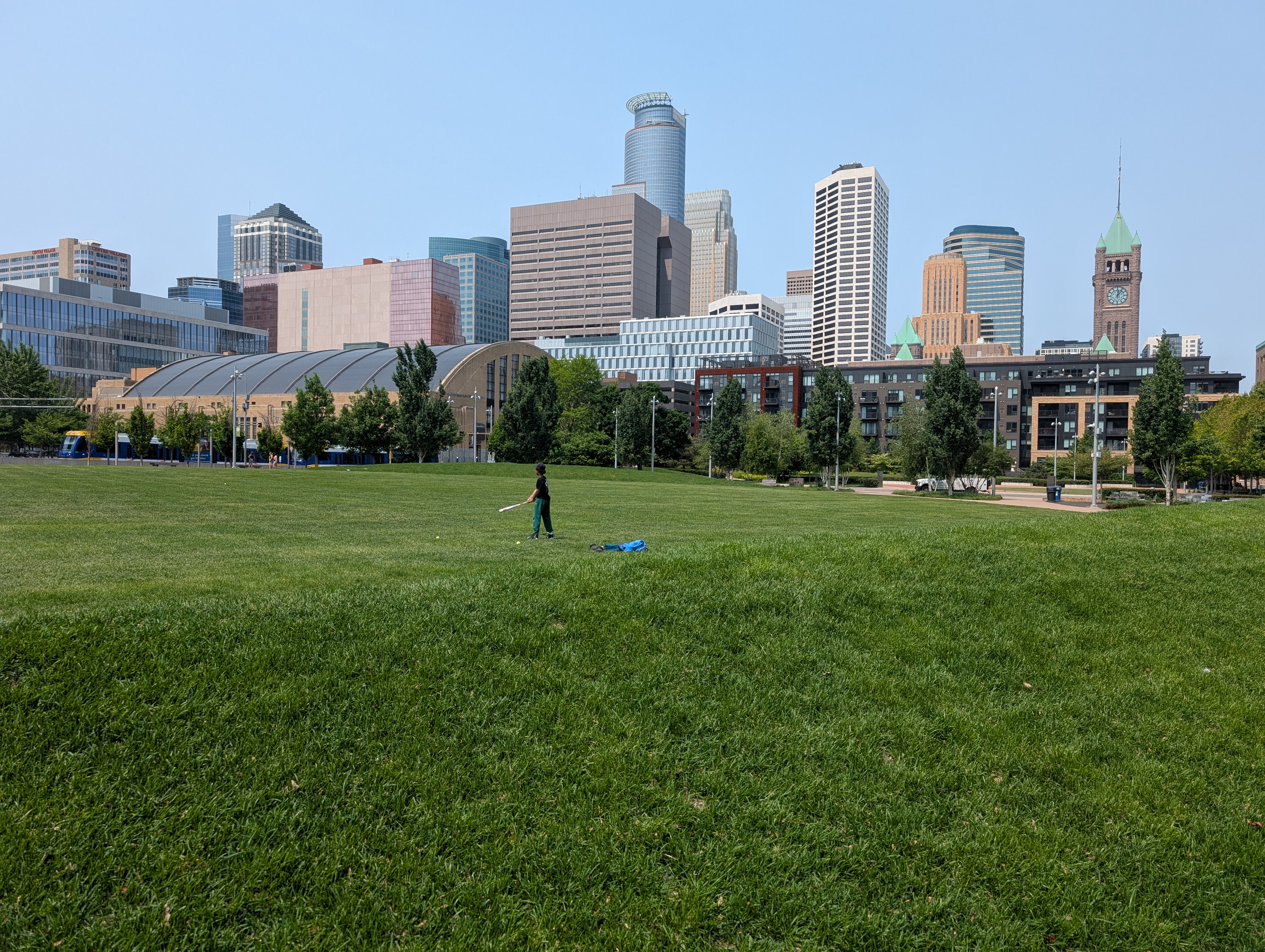

- Location within Minnesota
- Location: Minneapolis, Minnesota, USA
- Coordinates: 44.975868°N 93.262033°W
- Area: 4.2 acres (1.7 ha)
- Opened: June 2016

Downtown East Commons or The Commons or Commons Park is an urban park in Downtown East, Minneapolis, Minnesota. Opened in July 2016, the 4.2-acre (1.7 ha) park covers two city blocks. The park lies between South 4th and 5th Streets, and between 5th Avenue South and Park Avenue. Portland Avenue bisects the park. It is adjacent to U.S. Bank Stadium and the stadium's Metro Transit station.

Owned by the Minneapolis Park and Recreation Board, the park is leased to and operated by the city of Minneapolis. The city agreed to give the Minnesota Vikings free use of the park. This agreement is the subject of a current lawsuit, and in May 2018, a Hennepin County judge ruled that the Park Board, rather than Minneapolis, has sole authority to operate the park. In December 2018, a judge again ruled that Minneapolis should not operate the park. In February 2019, a judge ruled that the lease violates the city's charter and must terminate by May 1, 2019, such that the Park and Recreation Board will operate the park (including a multi-million-dollar fee for the Vikings' use).

The park is accessible via two shared-use pathways, Samatar Crossing and Hiawatha LRT Trail, that are part of the city's vast trail network for bicycling and pedestrian use.
