= Minnesota Department of Employment and Economic Development =

Minnesota Department of Employment and Economic Development (DEED)
Agency overview
- Jurisdiction: Minnesota
- Headquarters: 332 Minnesota St. Saint Paul, Minnesota
- Agency executives: Steve Grove, Commissioner; Hamse Warfa, Deputy Commissioner; Kevin McKinnon, Deputy Commissioner; Evan Rowe, Assistant Commissioner
- Parent agency: State of Minnesota
- Website: Official website

The Minnesota Department of Employment and Economic Development (DEED) is the State of Minnesota’s principal economic development agency. Its mission includes supporting the economic success of individuals, businesses, and communities by improving opportunities for growth.

== History ==
The Minnesota DEED was created in July 2003 by the merger of the Minnesota Department of Trade and Economic Development (DTED) and the Minnesota Department of Economic Security (MDES).

== Divisions ==
=== Business and Community Development ===
The Business and Community Development (BCD) division provides financial and technical services to businesses, communities, and economic development professionals. The division promotes and assists in the expansion of exports and works with Minnesota-based companies that are interested in expansion. BCD also works with companies interested in relocating to Minnesota. Additionally, BCD helps Minnesota communities with financing infrastructure projects. Additionally, BCD helps Minnesota communities with financing infrastructure projects. DEED’s Small Business Innovation Research (SBIR) and Small Business Technology Transfer (STTR) support program provides guidance and proposal assistance to Minnesota startups.

=== Workforce Development ===
The Workforce Development Division works with local and statewide partners to provide training and support to unemployed and dislocated workers, and financial assistance for businesses seeking to upgrade the skills of their workforce. Additional services include state services for the blind, rehabilitation services, local labor exchange, and disability determination. Many of these services are provided at CareerForce locations throughout the state.

=== Unemployment Insurance ===
The unemployment insurance division provides a temporary partial wage replacement to Minnesota workers who become unemployed through no fault of their own. It is an economic stabilizer and stimulator during economic downturns and helps maintain an available skilled workforce.

=== Communications, Analysis, and Research ===
The Communications, Analysis and Research Division coordinates DEED’s information resources and provides centralized services in the areas of communications, marketing, publications, economic analysis, and labor market and other research. The division also implements the state branding program—Positively Minnesota—in partnership with business, industry, education, and governmental organizations.
