= Hiawatha LRT Trail =

Shared-use path in Minneapolis

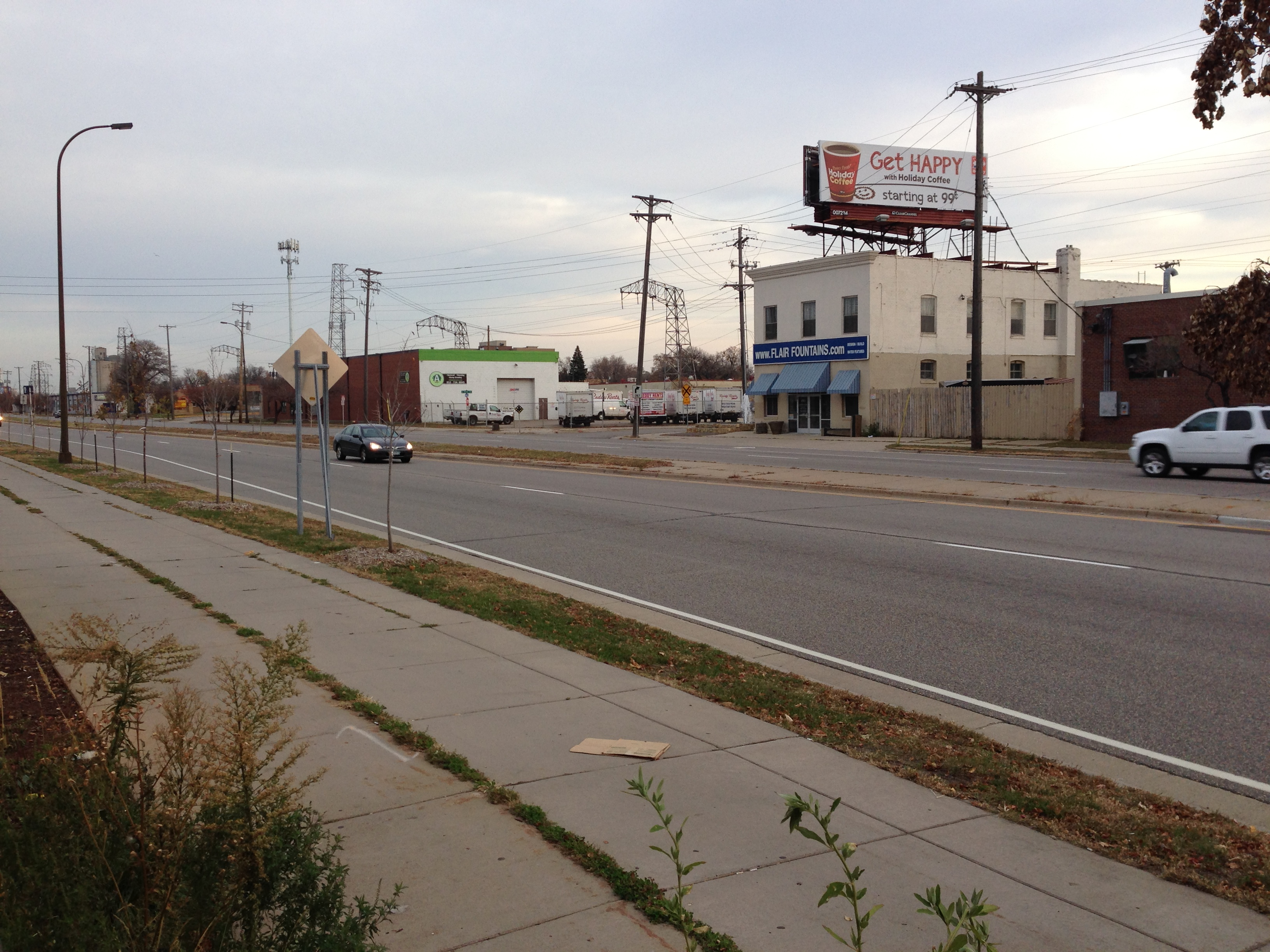
- Hiawatha LRT Trail at left alongside Hiawatha Avenue heading north from East 46th Street

Hiawatha LRT Trail
- Length: 4.7 mi (7.6 km)
- Location: Minneapolis, Minnesota, United States
- Trailheads: Norm McGrew Place/3rd Avenue (north); East Minnehaha Parkway (south)
- Use: Cycling, Pedestrians
- Grade: Mostly flat
- Difficulty: Easy
- Season: Year-round
- Sights: City skyline views; Grain mills and murals; Minnehaha Creek
- Hazards: Lack of signage; Light rail line; Safety concerns; Traffic intersections
- Surface: Concrete and asphalt

Hiawatha LRT Trail is a 4.7-mile (7.6 km), multi-use path adjacent to a light-rail transit line in Minneapolis, Minnesota, United States. Users travel along the Metro Blue Line and Hiawatha Avenue transit corridor, reaching downtown Minneapolis near an indoor sports stadium at the trail’s northern end, and reaching a bridge above Minnehaha Creek at the trail’s southern end. Hiawatha LRT Trail provides a link between several Minneapolis neighborhoods and the city’s downtown area.

== Route ==
Most of the relatively flat, 4.7-mile (7.6 km) Hiawatha LRT Trail has a concrete surface, though some sections are asphalt. Significant changes in trail grade only occur when traversing over highway bridges. There are a number of at-grade intersections with vehicular traffic along the route, and some rail crossings. Allowable uses on the trail include bicycling and other forms of pedestrian activity. The trail allows for connection to east-west bicycle routes, such as the Midtown Greenway and Minnehaha Creek trail. Lack of adequate signage has made route identification difficult for some users, especially in the area around East Lake Street.

The trail’s northern end is at Norm McGrew Place and 3rd Avenue in downtown Minneapolis. Picking up the trail at its northern terminus, after one city block, the trail mostly follows alongside the Metro Blue Line route diagonally southward, running on the east side of the train tracks. From downtown, trail users are able traverse over several ramps and lanes of Interstate 35W to the Cedar-Riverside neighborhood. Near the Midtown Greenway and Martin Olav Sabo Bridge, the light-rail track and mixed-use path diverge. The mixed-use path remains on the east side of Hiawatha Avenue, where prior to 2019 there was a gap in the trail, while the train crosses a rail-only bridge near East 28th Street.

After the Midtown Greenway area, mixed-use trail users heading southward stay east of Hiawatha Avenue on the newest trail segment until East 32nd Avenue. From there, trail users must cross Hiawatha Avenue, picking up the Hiawatha LRT Trail as it rejoins the Metro Blue Line. Trail users are between Hiawatha Avenue and the light-rail tracks from East 32nd Avenue to East 46th Avenue. At East 46th Avenue, the trail crosses the light-rail tracks westward, then diverges from the transit way to traverse alongside Minnehaha Creek before reaching a bridge at East Minnehaha Parkway near Minnehaha Regional Park.

Key places from north to south:

- Downtown East Commons (via street crossings)
- Downtown East station
- Indoor sports stadium
- Curie Park
- Samatar Crossing southern trailhead
- Cedar–Riverside station
- Franklin Avenue station
- East Phillips Park (via an approach trail)
- Midtown Greenway and Martin Olav Sabo Bridge
- Little Earth Trail (via bridge or street crossing)
- Lake Street/Midtown station
- Grain silos in the Longfellow community
- 38th Street station
- 46th Street station
- Min Hi Line southern terminus (via street crossings)
- Minnehaha Creek and trail
- Minnehaha Regional Park

== History ==
Hiawatha LRT Trail is part of dual transit way known as a rails-with-trails system. The transit way opened in 2004 with a mixed-use path running alongside the Hiawatha light-rail transit (LRT) line for most of its route. The multi-use trail has been referred to as “Hiawatha Trail,” "Hiawatha LRT Trail,” and "Hiawatha Bike Trail.” The region’s transit authority, which owns the train and trail, re-branded the train route as the Metro Blue Line in 2013, and discontinued use of the LRT moniker.

=== Planning ===
Hiawatha LRT Trail has been featured in Minneapolis city efforts to improve bicycling and transit infrastructure. The city’s first master bike plan in 2011 identified many opportunities for improvement to the Hiawatha LRT Trail, such as establishment of linear parkways, more bicycle racks, greater connectivity in the Cedar-Riverside area, and better lightning. Public comments for an update to the plan in 2014 identified the need for greater trail inter connectivity and protected intersection crossings. In 2015, the city planned to close a gap in the trail, which it later addressed in 2019.

=== Safety patrols ===
In 2008, there were several robberies and assaults of trail users on Hiawatha LRT Trail and the connecting Midtown Greenway. The incidents led to the formation of the volunteer organization Trail Watch. Bike-mounted safety volunteers of the organization patrol Hiawatha LRT Trail and Midtown Greenway, reporting suspicious behavior to the city and cleaning up the trails. The incidents also led Minneapolis police to increase patrols in the area.

=== Samatar Crossing ===
In 2018, Minneapolis opened Samatar Crossing, named after Hussein Samatar, to allow for more ways that Cedar-Riverside area visitors and residents could connect to Hiawatha LRT Trail, other neighborhoods, and downtown. The relatively short Samatar Crossing trail runs parallel to Hiawatha LRT Trail, originating from the west side of the light-rail tracks near the Cedar–Riverside station, traversing over Interstate 35W, and eventually reaching 11th Street in downtown. Compared to Hiawatha LRT Trail, the newer Samatar Crossing features greater path width, separate lanes for bicycles and pedestrians, better lightning, and the potential for public art installments.

=== Trail gap remediation ===
The Hiawatha transit corridor has undergone fragmented reconfiguration over the past several decades. In 1999, construction of Hiawatha Avenue included a 12-foot (3.7 m) wide path along the west side of the highway. The addition of light-rail transit to the Hiawatha corridor in 2004 reduced the west-side trail between East 28th Street and East 32nd Street to the width of a regular city sidewalk, which resulted in a half-mile (0.8 km) “gap.” In 2019, the city constructed a multi-use path on the east side of Hiawatha Avenue from the Midtown Greenway at East 28th Street to East 32nd Street, providing users with a wide, multi-use pathway throughout Hiawatha corridor in south Minneapolis, closing the gap that had existed from 2004 to 2019.

== See also ==
- Bicycle commuting
- Cycling in Minnesota
- Cycling infrastructure
- List of shared-use paths in Minneapolis
- Metro Transit
- Rail trail
