= Cedar–Riverside station =

Light rail station in Minneapolis, Minnesota

Cedar–Riverside
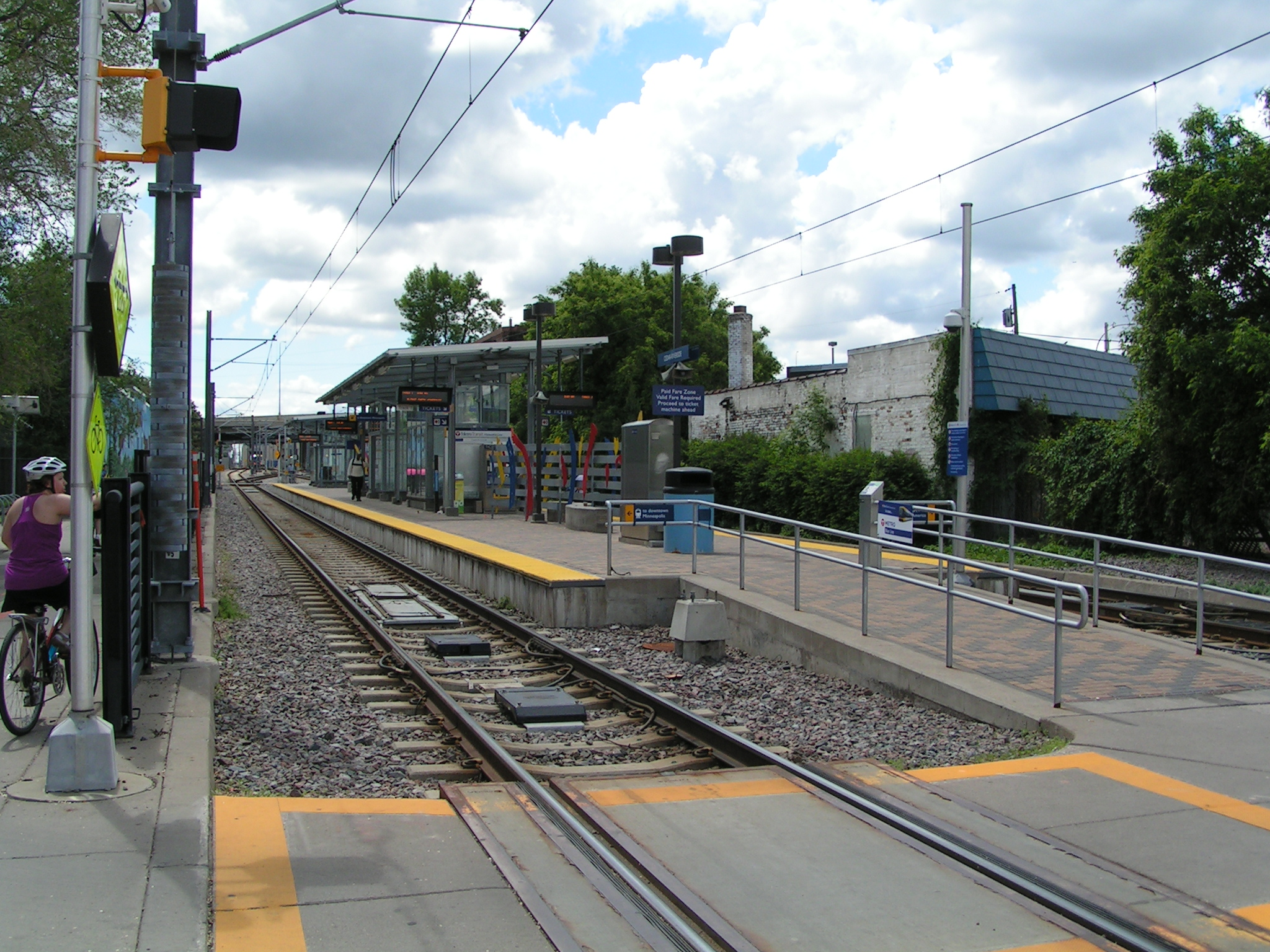
- Cedar–Riverside station platform

General information
- Location: 613 15th Avenue South; Minneapolis, Minnesota
- Coordinates: 44°58′06″N 93°15′04″W
- Owner: Metro Transit
- Platforms: 1 island platform
- Tracks: 2

Construction
- Structure type: At-grade
- Accessible: Yes

History
- Opened: June 26, 2004

Passengers
- 2025: 549 daily ▼4.7%
- Rank: 28 out of 37

Services
| Preceding station | Metro | Following station |
|---|---|---|
| U.S. Bank Stadium toward Target Field | Blue Line | Franklin Avenue toward Mall of America |
Location

Cedar–Riverside station is a light rail station on the Blue Line in Minneapolis, Minnesota.

The station is located between 15th and 16th Avenues South, near the interchange of Interstate 35W, Interstate 94, and Minnesota State Highway 55. It is a center-platform station and is one of a few stations where there are no designated bus routes to transfer to or from, though buses run along Cedar Avenue a few blocks away. Service began at this station when the Blue Line opened on June 26, 2004.

As light rail vehicles are removed from service following the rush hour peak, the Cedar–Riverside station is the last stop for the trains and all passengers must disembark at that point. The maintenance base for the line is located between this station and the Franklin Avenue stop to the south.

The transparent roof of the station has constellations marked on it.

== Notable places nearby ==
- Cedar-Riverside Neighborhood
- Currie Park
- Hiawatha LRT Trail
- Samatar Crossing
- West Bank of the University of Minnesota (5-6 blocks)
