= Minneapolis Public Housing Authority =

Public housing authority

The Minneapolis Public Housing Authority is a public housing authority (PHA) serving the city of Minneapolis. It is the largest provider of affordable housing in Minnesota. It was established with its current name in 1986. It is one of 39 Moving to Work (MTW) housing authorities funded by the department of Housing and Urban Development (HUD).

It owns public housing, and has a housing choice voucher program.

Its executive director is Abdi Warsame.

In 2022, the MPHA managed housing including 15 single-family homes, 217 townhouse units, and 4,821 high-rise apartment units, housing about 5,000 households in total. For more information, see this list of developments.

In 2022, the MPHA spent $45 million on MTW housing choice voucher rent subsidies and averaged 4,212 housing choice vouchers under lease per month, and spent $17.8 million on non-MTW vouchers and averaged 1,598 under lease each month.

In 2022, the MPHA had total revenue of $151.6 million from tenant rental income, HUD, the city of Minneapolis, and other government grants. It had total assets (including housing) of $292 million

In 1995, the NAACP successfully sued several agencies including the MPHA, showing that these agencies had worked to ``concentrate" people of color in the city's poorest areas.

In 2019, a fire in an MPHA housing complex left 5 people dead.
