= Robert Lilligren =

American politician

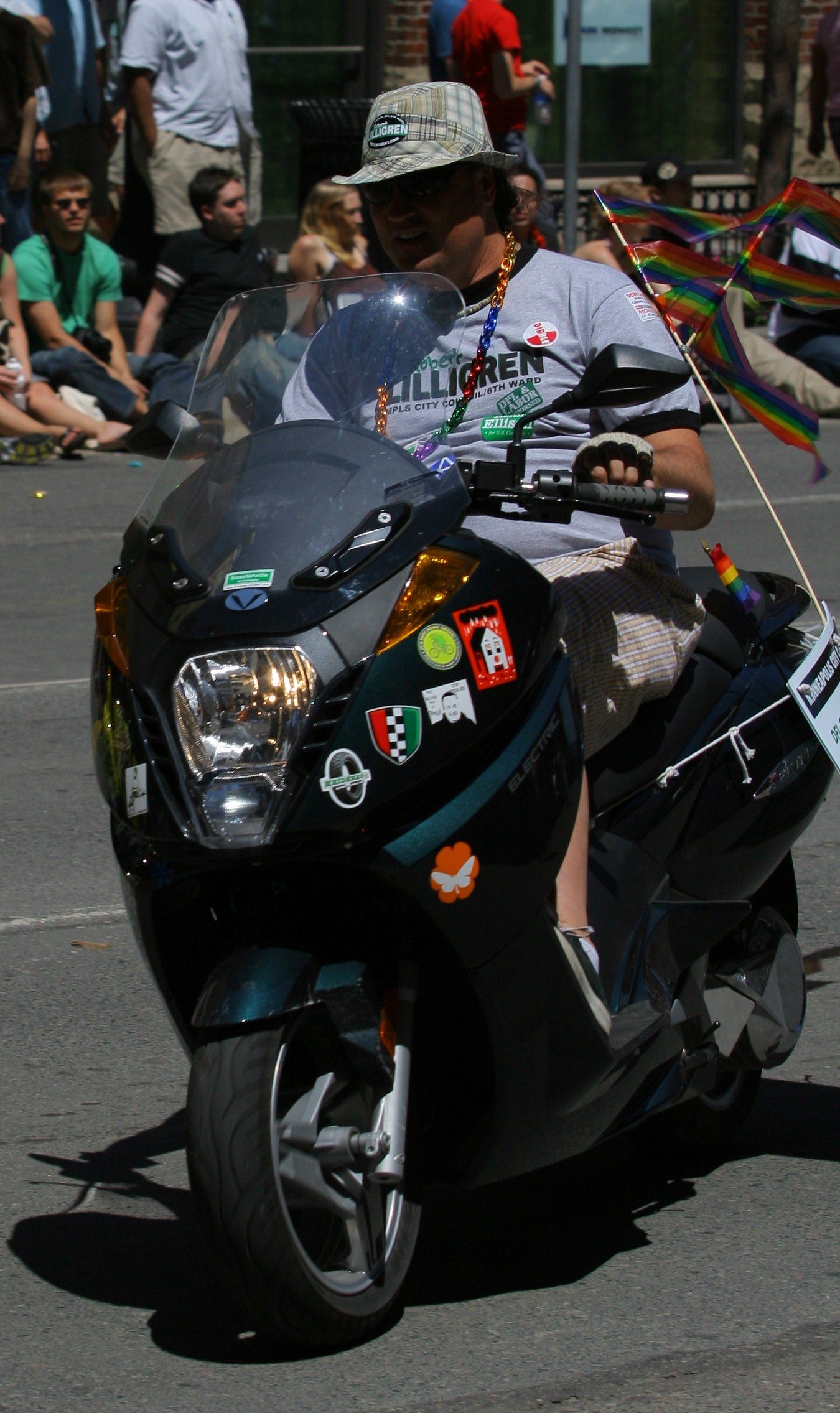
Lilligren on a motorcycle during a Minneapolis Pride Parade in 2009

Robert Lilligren (born July 2, 1960) is an American politician and member of the Minnesota Democratic-Farmer-Labor Party. He was an elected member of the Minneapolis City Council. He was first elected in 2001, to represent the 8th Ward of the Minneapolis City Council. Following the defeat of Green Party member Dean Zimmermann, during the 2005 municipal elections, Lilligren represented the 6th Ward of the City of Minneapolis. When first elected to office, Lilligren was serving as a volunteer on eight different community boards and commissions including: vice-chair of Phillips West Neighborhood organization, the Midtown Greenway Coalition (a bike/walk advocacy group), the Hennepin County-appointed I-35W Project Advisory Committee, and as a board member for several affordable housing groups throughout South Minneapolis. He lost his re-election bid in 2013 to Abdi Warsame. He was appointed to the Metropolitan Council by Governor Tim Walz in March 2019.

== Personal ==
Lilligren, as a member of the White Earth Band of Ojibwe, is the first American Indian tribal member to serve on the Minneapolis City Council. In addition, he was one of two openly gay city council members; an avid reader, and a classically trained singer. He does not own a car.

== History ==
Shortly after Lilligren moved to Minneapolis in 1984, crack arrived in Minneapolis and specifically his neighborhood of Phillips West. [5] Lilligren stayed on his block, purchasing rundown apartment buildings and renovating them with Joe Olson, his business partner. They currently own several buildings in South Minneapolis and still reside in those buildings.

A key focus of Robert's first term in office was helping to jump start the stalled Sears project – a 2 million square foot vacant and dark building- which is now the up and running Midtown Exchange. His leadership helped to set and exceed historically high minority and women workforce and contractor goals for the project. He drafted language into the project's Request for Proposals (RFP) that allowed for the creation of the Global Market at the Midtown Exchange, an open market that brings opportunities for local entrepreneurs – many from new arrival and immigrant communities – and makes fresh food and produce more available to inner-city residents.

== Notable work ==
- Midtown Exchange
- I-35W Access Project
- ShotSpotter gunfire locator funding in Minneapolis

== Appointments ==
City Council Committee Positions

- Committee of the Whole - Chair
- Executive Committee - Member
- Community Development - Member
- Transportation and Public Works - Member (Former Vice Chair)
- Information Services Policy Steer Group - Member (Founding Chair)
- Minneapolis Community Development Agency – Secretary
- Rules and Taxes Committees - Member

Other Council Appointments

- Transportation Advisory Board (TAB) – Member/Chair Programming Committee
- Northern Lights Express (Duluth to Minneapolis passenger rail) Alliance - Minneapolis representative
- Transit Improvement Board Advisory Committee (GEARS) - Minneapolis representative
- I-35W Solutions Alliance – Vice Chair
- Bike/Walk Twin Cities Advisory Council to Transit for Livable Communities
- Met Council Transportation Committee (TAB representative) - Non-voting member
- Meet Minneapolis Convention and Visitors Association Board – Executive Committee
- Neighborhood Revitalization Program Policy Board - Alternate
- Citywide Labor Management Committee - Member
- Midtown Community Works Partnership Executive Committee - Member
- Minneapolis Bioscience Corridor Governance Board – Member
- Minneapolis Rail Policy Group – Member
- Southwest Corridor LRT Policy Advisory Committee - Minneapolis representative (completed 2010)
- Minneapolis Metropolitan Council Workgroup – Member (completed 2011)
- Civilian Review Authority Redesign Committee - Chair (completed 2007)
- Neighborhood Revitalization Program Workgroup – Chair (completed 2010)
- Minneapolis Empowerment Zone Governance Board - Member (completed 2010)

Other Community Work

- Native American Community Development Institute Founding Board Chair
- Women's Environmental Institute Board Member
- OutFront MN Board Member
- Bikeon(.org,) Founding Board Member
- Inter-Tribal Elder Services Ex-Officio Board Member
- Minneapolis Crisis Nursery Capital Campaign Committee (completed)
- Minneapolis American Indian Center Capital Campaign Committee (completed)
- LSS Center for Changing Lives Capital Campaign Committee (completed)
