= Abdirizak Bihi =

Somali social activist

Abdirizak Bihi عبد الرزاق بيحي
- Born: Somalia
- Occupation: activist
- Title: Director of the Somali Education and Social Advocacy Center

Abdirizak Bihi (Somali: Cabdirisaaq Biixi, Arabic: عبد الرزاق بيهي) is a Somali-American social activist. Since 1996, he has been an organizer within the Somali community in Minneapolis, Minnesota. Bihi is the Director of the Somali Education and Social Advocacy Center. In this capacity, he has worked toward educating and training Somali leaders for civic action.
