= Franklin Avenue station (Metro Transit) =

Light rail station in Minneapolis, Minnesota

Franklin Avenue
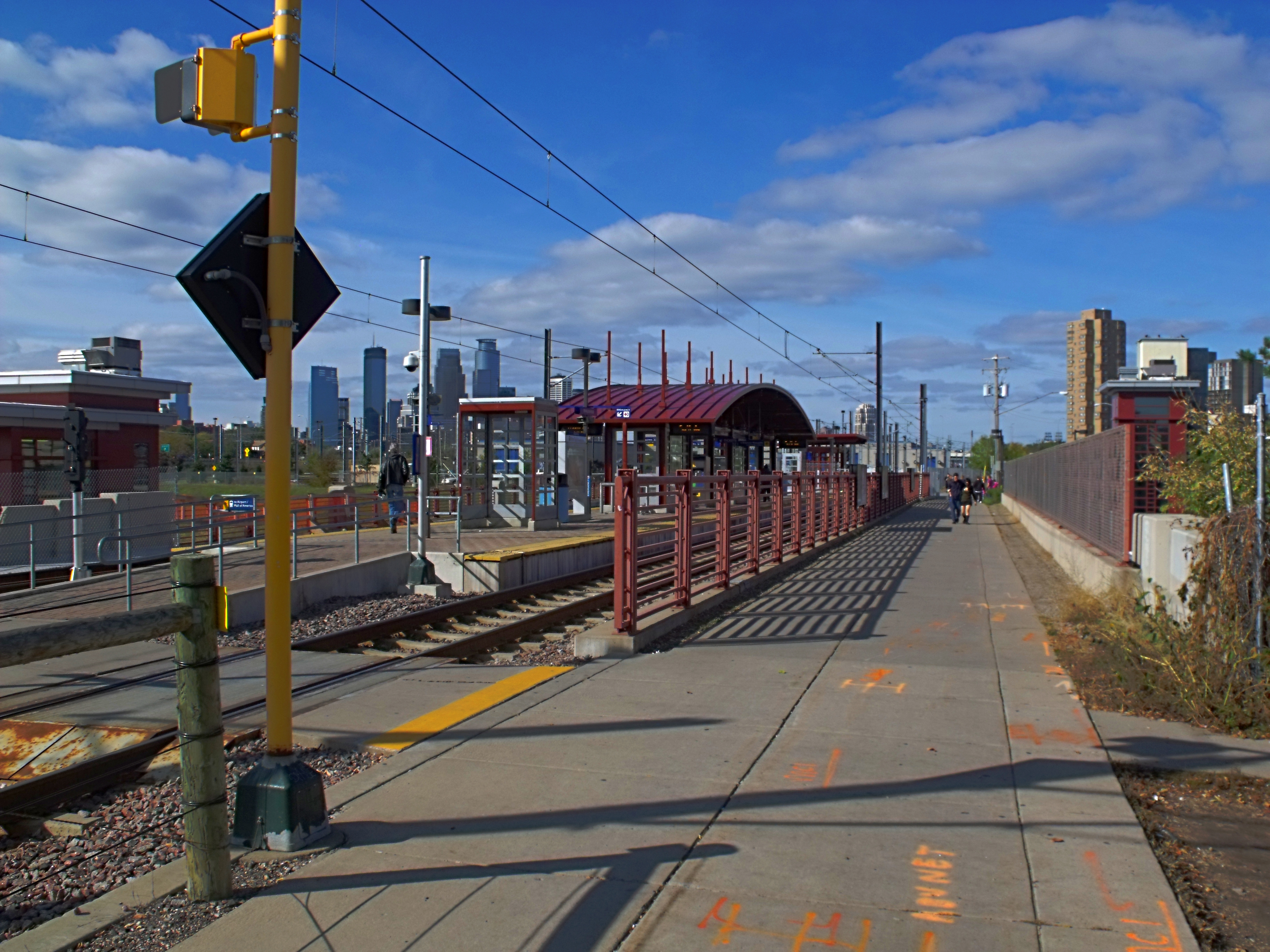
- Franklin Avenue station platform

General information
- Location: 1808 Franklin Avenue East; Minneapolis, Minnesota
- Coordinates: 44°57′45″N 93°14′50″W
- Owner: Metro Transit
- Platforms: 1 island platform
- Tracks: 2
- Connections: Metro Transit: 2, 9, 22, 67

Construction
- Structure type: At-grade
- Accessible: Yes

History
- Opened: June 26, 2004

Passengers
- 2025: 1,101 daily ▼12.8%
- Rank: 17 out of 37

Services
Preceding station	Metro	Following station
Cedar–Riverside toward Target Field	Blue Line	Lake Street/Midtown toward Mall of America
Location

Franklin Avenue station is a light rail station on the Blue Line in Minneapolis, Minnesota.

This station is a bridge above Franklin Avenue along Minnesota State Highway 55, in Minneapolis. This is a center-platform station. Along with the Lake Street station, Franklin Avenue is one of the two above-grade stations on the Blue Line. The station is home to the marquee of the New Franklin theater, located nearby. Service began at this station when the Blue Line opened on June 26, 2004.

The maintenance base of the line is just to the north, between this stop and Cedar-Riverside. When train operators begin and end their shifts, they used to make an extra stop there to take on the new driver. The driver now boards and departs the train at Franklin Avenue station.

A transit-oriented development master plan for the station and Cedar-Riverside was released in 2002.

In September 2022, unarmed private security hired by the Metropolitan Council began patrolling the station. The station was chosen because of high police activity and because it is a location where train operators get on and off trains. Allied Universal was hired in March 2023 to patrol the station 24 hours a day, seven days a week. Franklin Avenue is one of four stations that Metro Transit is analyzing in a several million dollar study to determine if turnstiles can improve fare payment compliance and safety.

== Bus connections ==
From Franklin Avenue Station, there is a direct connection to routes 2, 9, and 67. Route 22 stops just a block away.

== Notable places nearby ==
- East Phillips Park
- Hiawatha LRT Trail
- Little Earth Trail
- Phillips neighborhood
- Seward neighborhood
- Ventura Village neighborhood
