= Abdi Warsame =

American politician

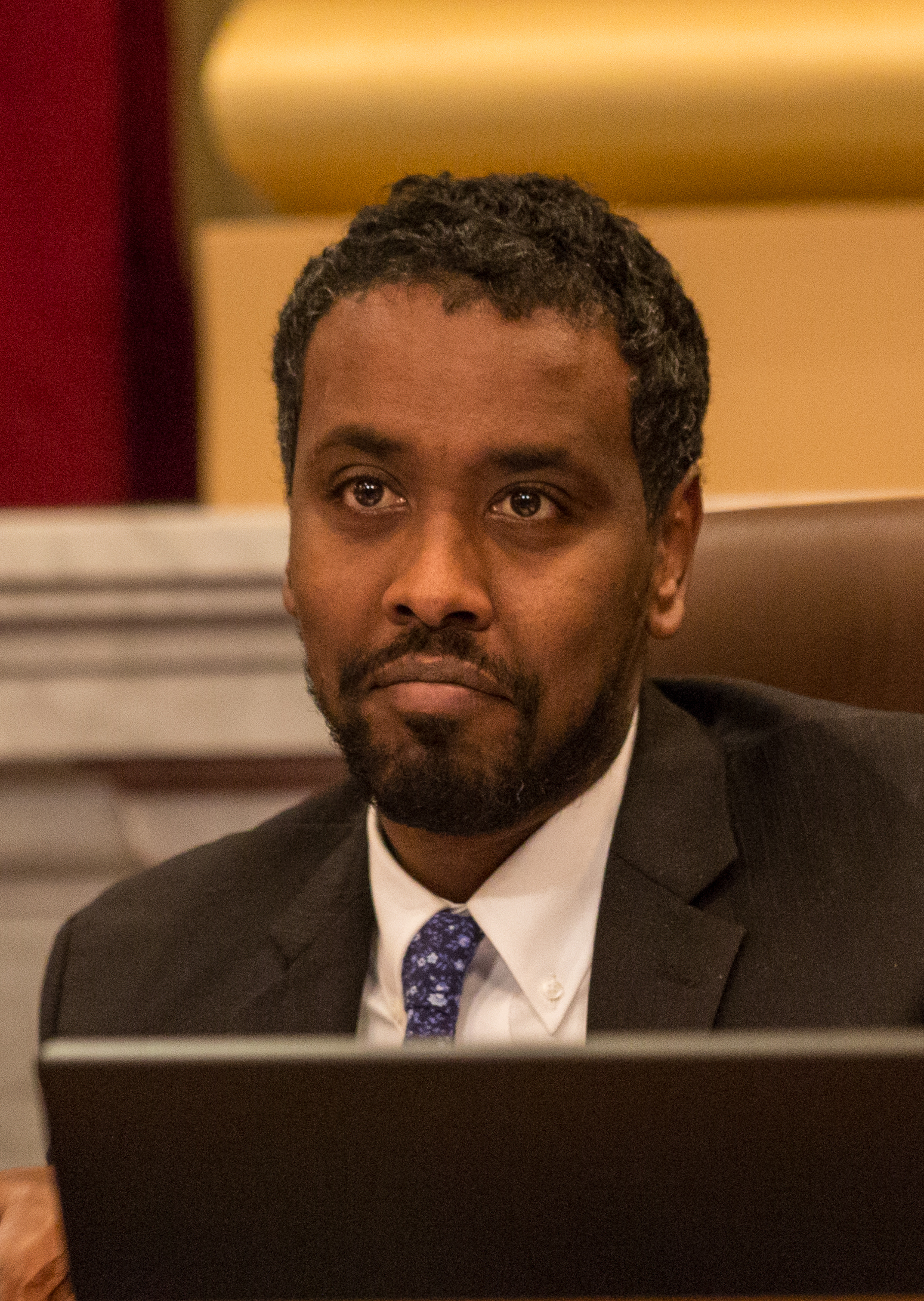

Member of the Minneapolis City Council from the 6th Ward
- In office January 2, 2014 – March 30, 2020
- Preceded by: Robert Lilligren
- Succeeded by: Jamal Osman

Personal details
- Born: March 5, 1978 (age 48) Mogadishu, Somalia
- Party: Democratic
- Children: 4
- Education: Middlesex University (BS); University of Greenwich (MBA)
- Website: Official website

Abdi Warsame (born 1978) is a Somali-American politician in Minnesota's Democratic–Farmer–Labor Party. After moving to London as an asylum-seeker, he immigrated to Minnesota in 2006. In November 2013, he was elected to the Minneapolis City Council, becoming the first Somali official to be elected to the position. Warsame was reelected for a second term in 2017. He resigned from the position in 2020 to become the head of the Minneapolis Public Housing Authority.

== Early life and education ==
Warsame was born on March 5, 1978, in Mogadishu, Somalia. In the late 1980s, his family sought asylum in London. Warsame earned a Bachelor of Science degree in business from the Middlesex University. He also holds a master's degree in International Business from the University of Greenwich. In 2006, Warsame immigrated to Minneapolis, Minnesota.

== Career ==
=== Early career ===
Warsame first entered politics in 2011, while working on Mohamud Noor's campaign for a state Senate seat on a DFL ticket.

Warsame was the founder and spokesperson for the Citizen's Committee for Fair Redistricting, which took part in the Minneapolis redistricting process. The group lobbied the Minneapolis Charter Commission to redraw the municipality's political districts so as to maximize the East African community's vote. The commission concurred and established a number of new precincts in Ward 6.

Warsame chaired the Cedar Riverside-Neighborhood Revitalization Program and served as executive director of the Riverside Plaza Tenants Association, which represents the tenants of Riverside Plaza.

=== 2013 election ===
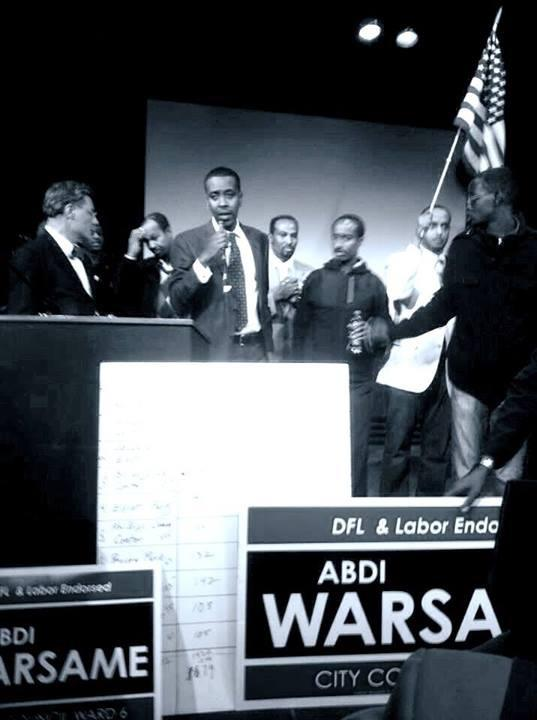
Warsame's victory speech in 2013

Warsame ran in the 2013 Minneapolis municipal elections to represent Ward 6 on the Minneapolis City Council.

Somali-American professionals contributed significantly to Warsame's election campaign. His campaign finance filings put him among the top tier of successful fundraisers in Minneapolis' 13 wards. Lawyer and political operative Brian Rice was Warsame's strategist for the campaign.

Warsame's campaign was criticized by DFLer Robert Lilligren's caucus captain Maryam Marne Zafar, who alleged that Warsame supporters tried to turn voters away from Lilligren by highlighting the fact that Lilligren was openly gay. Lilligren also charged that Warsame supporters had capitalized on language barriers to win votes. Warsame dismissed the claims as sour grapes stemming from a lack of support for Lilligren's campaign, and added that he specifically told members of his political team not to use Lilligren's sexual orientation as a talking point. A DFL committee also rejected the Lilligren team's allegations.

Just before the election, the political action committee of Palestinian real estate developer Basim Sabri, who had a personal feud with Lilligren, produced controversial fliers smearing Lilligren and asserting that he discriminated against minorities, the elderly, and the poor. The fliers urged voters instead to cast their ballots for Warsame. Warsame's campaign team emailed a statement denouncing the Sabri committee's pamphlets and their use of Warsame's name. It also indicated that Sabri and his action group were unaffiliated with the Vote Warsame For Ward 6 campaign and were instead acting out of their own volition.

On November 5, 2013, Warsame was elected to represent the predominantly East-African Ward 6 on the Minneapolis City Council. He was the first-choice preference of 64% of voters, and received 40% of second-choice votes, and 20% of third-choice votes. The incumbent, Robert Lilligren, received 32% of first-choice votes, almost 27% of second-choice votes, and 13% of third-choice votes. The victory makes Warsame the first Somali American to hold the position. Warsame and Ahmed M. Hassan, who was elected to the Clarkston, Georgia City Council on the same day, are the first Somali Americans to be elected to municipal offices in the United States and were the highest elected Somali Americans in the country at the time. Warsame's election set civic precedence in the Somali American community of Minneapolis, in which his campaign energized and mobilized this sub-community's powerful voting bloc.

Warsame was reelected in 2017 by about 4%, around 240 votes. In early 2020, partway through his term, he was appointed head of the Minneapolis Public Housing Authority. He resigned from his City Council seat on March 30 of that year to take the new position, the first Somali person to lead one of Minnesota's public agencies. Jamal Osman was elected in August to fill Warsame's seat.

== Personal life ==
Warsame is married and has four children. He is a resident of the Cedar-Riverside neighborhood, which is home to the largest concentration of Somalis outside of East Africa.

== Electoral history ==
Minneapolis City Council Ward 6 election, 2013
Political party/principle	Candidate	% 1st Choice	Round 1
DFL	Abdi Warsame	63.92	3,090
DFL	Robert Lilligren	32.21	1,557
DFL	Abdi Addow	1.80	87
DFL	Sheikh Abdul	0.81	39
DFL	Mahamed A Cali	0.52	25
DFL	Abukar Abdi	0.41	20
N/A	Write-in	0.33	16
Maximum possible threshold: 2,526; Valid: 4,834; Undervotes: 205; Turnout: 5,051
