= Religion in Minnesota =

Religious affiliation in Minnesota (2024)
1. Lutheranism (23.0%)
2. Other Protestants (20.0%)
3. Catholic Church (18.0%)
4. Other Christians (2.00%)
5. Islam (3.00%)
6. Other/unspecified (5.00%)
7. Unaffiliated (29.0%)

Religion in Minnesota is characterized by a variety of beliefs and practices that has historically been dominated by Christianity. The state has no official church, adhering to the Establishment Clause and Everson v. Board of Education. The right to freedom of religion is a constitutionally protected liberty in Minnesota.

Prior to European colonization, the area now known as Minnesota was home to indigenous religions and belief systems, primarily the customs and spiritual practices of the Native Americans. The mid-19th century saw the establishment of various Christian denominations as the region became a new home for waves of European immigrants, each bringing their own religious traditions. This has led to a landscape where Protestantism, particularly Lutheran denominations, alongside Roman Catholicism, form a majority of the state's religious identity. As of 2014, about 75% of Minnesotans are Christian, down from 84% in 2008. This declined to 63% in 2024.

Over the last few decades, the state's religious makeup has diversified. The 21st century has been marked by growing numbers of non-Christian religions in Minnesota, particularly Islam. Recent data also indicates that about 30% of the state now identifies with no religion. Nevertheless, faith remains a significant aspect of life for many Minnesotans: 83% of the population expresses some belief in God, 57% consider religion to at least somewhat important in their lives, and 21% participate in religious services at least weekly.

== History ==
=== Indigenous beliefs and first missionaries ===
The first religious influences in Minnesota were the spiritual practices of Native American tribes, such as the Dakota and Ojibwe (Anishinaabe), whose traditional beliefs focused on nature and ancestral spirits and included Midewiwin and Wabunowin. In 1680, Father Louis Hennepin, a Catholic missionary from Belgium, arrived in the Lake Pepin region. At that time, the area was claimed by France. Despite the efforts of Hennepin and subsequent Protestant missionaries, the conversion of the Dakota and the Ojibwe peoples to Christianity was largely unsuccessful due to the differences between their spiritual beliefs (e.g., Wakan Tanka) and those of the Christian faith.

The first Catholic Jesuit priest to arrive at Grand Portage was Father Charles Messager in 1731. International borders between Minnesota's Arrowhead Region and Canada were clarified in the Webster–Ashburton Treaty of 1842, which split the Ojibwe community in two.

=== European settlement ===
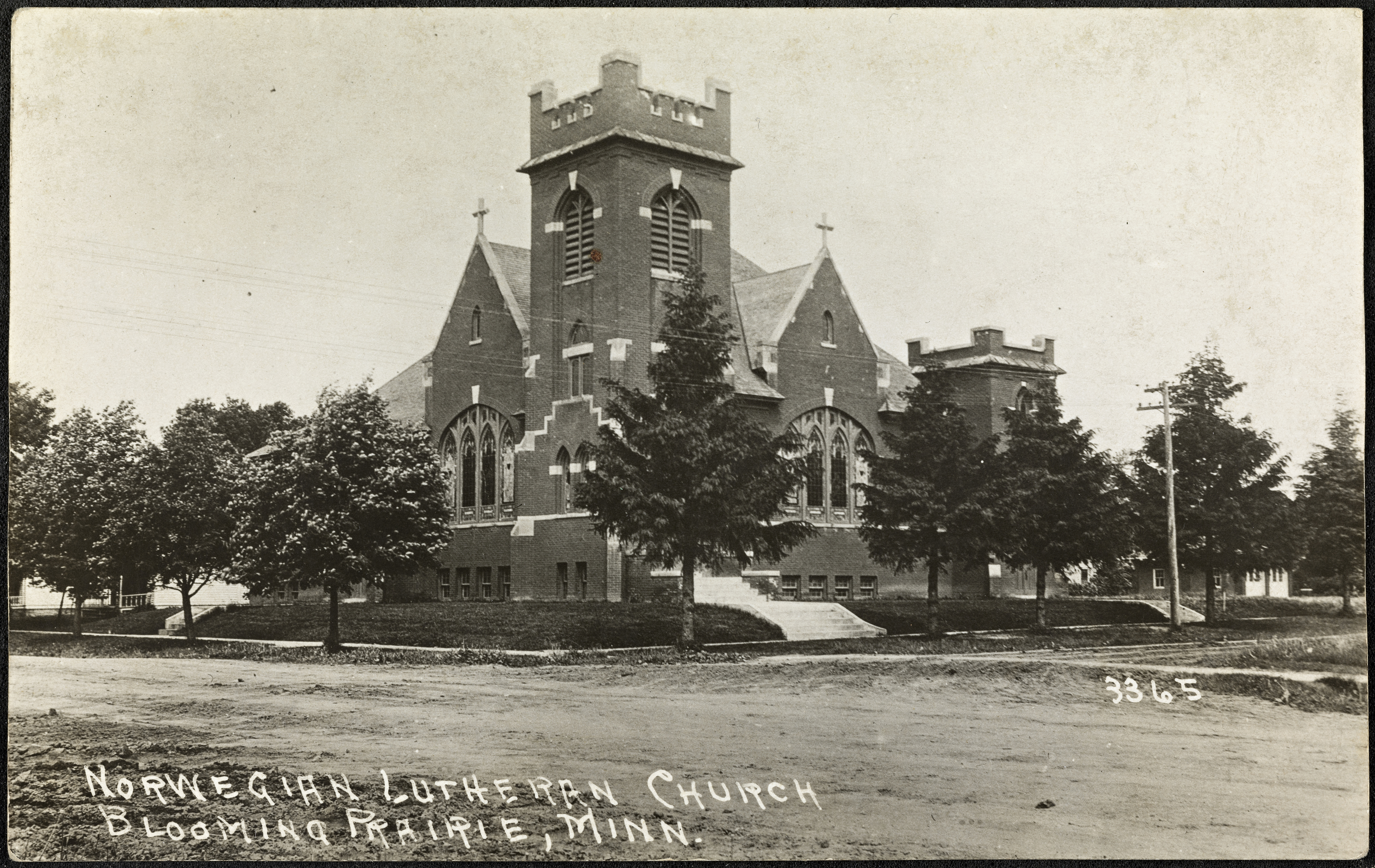
Norwegian Lutheran Church in Blooming Prairie around 1925

By the time the Roman Catholic diocese of Saint Paul was established in 1851, Christianity was dominant in Minnesota. With the gradual increase of population, the Archbishop John Ireland, serving from 1888 to 1918, was instrumental in the church's growth, advocating for "Americanism" and the integration of Catholic children into public schools. In these early years, there was stark ethnic divisions between German and Irish Catholics which bore out in the cultural practices and politics of the state.

Protestant Christian denominations, particularly Lutheranism, took root with the arrival of Scandinavian and German immigrants. Between 1850 and 1930, over a quarter of a million Swedes immigrated to Minnesota, a portion of whom were motivated by religious freedom, escaping intolerance by the Church of Sweden. These and other Scandinavians who settled in Minnesota formed several distinct Lutheran synods as well as their own Baptist, Methodist, Episcopal, and Mission Covenant churches. Some degree of reconciliation eventually emerged, and between 1890 and 1930 a series of mergers produced several new Lutheran churches. Many churches that had worshiped in Swedish, Norwegian, or German transitioned to English-language services in the 1920s and 1930s. These churches ultimately fed into the 1988 formation of the mainline Evangelical Lutheran Church in America (ELCA). The Norwegian Lutheran Memorial Church of Minneapolis is one of two American churches as of 2024 still using Norwegian as the primary liturgical language.

The ecclesiastical fragmentation and the schismatic nature of Protestantism in Minnesota, however, lessened its cultural dominance. This period also saw the rise of African American Protestant churches in North Minneapolis as well as the spread of movements like the Holiness movement.

Native Americans in Minnesota faced renewed efforts to suppress their culture, including the legacy of missionary-run boarding schools. This era was also marked by spiritual movements like the Ghost Dance, which faced severe repression.

=== 19th and 20th centuries ===
Minnesota's Protestant conservatism, particularly among Baptists, was exemplified by William Bell Riley, a Minneapolis pastor who led the fundamentalist movement and opposed Darwinian evolution and harbored anti-Semitic views. His influence nearly led to a ban on teaching evolution in public schools in 1927, but this was defeated due to concerns over religious freedom. By the mid-20th century, Riley handed over his ministry to Billy Graham, who later established his evangelistic association in Minneapolis.

Ethnic and doctrinal divisions within churches diminished throughout the 20th century in Minnesota, giving way to a broader progressive-conservative split. This divide became more pronounced with issues such as religious and racial discrimination, anti-Semitism, and gender roles in society. The debate over distinct gender roles created a schism between progressive mainline Protestant churches, conservative evangelical and Pentecostal churches, and the Catholic Church.

By the 1960s and 1970s, the religious landscape in Minnesota was also shaped by political issues such as abortion and LGBT rights. In 1968, the American Indian Movement was formed in Minneapolis by two Ojibwe leaders to reconnect Dakota and other native peoples with their language and spirituality. The founding of Minnesota Citizens Concerned for Life, also in 1968, marked a significant political influence that disrupted traditional party alignments, including a pro-life Catholic Democrat governor and a pro-life Jewish U.S. senator in 1978.

=== Recent history ===
In recent decades, Minnesota has seen growth in non-denominational Christianity as well as non-Christian religions. Immigration and refugee resettlement from Southeast Asia has led to the establishment of Buddhist and Hmong religious communities, while immigration from the Middle East and Somalia has contributed to the growth of the Muslim population. The Jewish community, with a history dating back to the late 19th century, is believed to have remained steady.

Minnesota also has a growing number of people who identify as non-religious, in line with national trends. The Pew Research Center's Religious Landscape Study showed that as of 2014, 20% of Minnesotans identified as unaffiliated with any religion, a category encompassing atheists, agnostics, and those who do not identify with any particular religion.

Religious affiliation of Minnesotans
Religion	2008	2014	2024
Christianity	84%	74%	63%
└ Mainline Protestant	32%	29%	22%
└ Catholic Church	28%	22%	18%
└ Evangelical Protestant	21%	19%	20%
└ Historically Black Protestant	1%	2%	1%
└ Mormon	<0.5%	1%	<1%
└ Orthodox	<0.5%	<1%	<1%
└ Other Christian	1%	1%	1%
Judaism	1%	1%	<1%
Islam	1%	1%	3%
Hinduism	<0.5%	<1%	<1%
Buddhism	<0.5%	<1%	<1%
Other religion	1%	1%	1%
Unaffiliated	13%	20%	29%

== Christianity ==
Largest denomination by county in 2020 Lutheranism: 25-49% >50% Catholicism: 25-49% >50%

The 2023-24 Pew Research Religious Landscape Survey estimated that 63% of the Minnesota population was Christian. Most identified as Protestant (42%) or Catholic (22%).

=== Protestant ===
Largest Protestant church by county in 2020 ELCA LCMS Other

Lutherans form the largest Protestant branch in Minnesota, with 24% of residents identifying as such. Among Lutheran denominations, the Evangelical Lutheran Church in America (ELCA) is the largest. Divided into six synods across the state, ELCA boasted 527,257 baptized members (9.09% of the population) across 991 congregations in 2022. However, this figure marks a 60,808 drop from the year prior and a significant descent from the 805,000 members observed in 1988 (18.71%). ELCA was still gaining new Minnesota members as recently as the early 2000s, but subsequently began declining due to fewer baptisms, more deaths, and resignations. A notable decrease in 2009 was linked to the church's newly adopted policy on same-gender relationships, with many congregations leaving. Since 2010, deaths and resignations have vastly outnumbered baptisms in the church. The other major Lutheran churches, namely the Lutheran Church—Missouri Synod (5%), the Wisconsin Evangelical Lutheran Synod (<1%), and the Evangelical Lutheran Synod (<1%), are also declining in membership and attendance. A further 1% of Minnesotans identify as Pietists. While an overwhelming majority of Lutherans in Minnesota are white, some recent immigrants from Ethiopia have established Oromo and Amhara Lutheran (P'ent'ay) churches.

Non-Lutheran Protestants are estimated to be 18% of the population. These include the United Methodist Church (41,466 self-reported members in 2024), Assemblies of God (109,568 self-reported members in 2023), Churches of Christ (1% of state), and Southern Baptist Convention (18,154 self-reported members across Minnesota and Wisconsin in 2024). The United Church of Christ reported 20,139 members in 2022, down from 26,270 in 2015.

An additional 5% of Minnesotans identify as non-denominational and 1% as Historically Black Protestant.

=== Catholic ===
It is estimated that 1.2 million Minnesotans, or 22% of the state, are Catholic. The Archdiocese of Saint Paul and Minneapolis is the largest diocese with approximately 800,000 Catholics across 186 parishes. Catholic schools educate over 50,000 students statewide.

=== Other Christian ===
The Church of Jesus Christ of Latter-day Saints (LDS Church) reports 33,365 members in Minnesota. The St. Paul Minnesota Temple, located in Saint Paul, was dedicated in 1982.

There is a small Eastern Orthodox community with many of its members originating from Syria, Ukraine, and Russia. A proportion Minnesota's Ethiopian immigrants are Oriental Orthodox.

The Amish, who practice Anabaptism, have grown from 1,420 in 2000 to 4,740 in 2020.

== Other religions ==
Collectively, it's estimated that members of non-Christian faiths constitute about 5% of the state.

=== Islam ===
Muslims have been in Minnesota since the 1880s, originally coming from the Ottoman Empire. Racially restrictive laws in the 1920s limited non-European immigration, affecting this growth. African Americans started converting to Islam in the 1920s, influenced by groups like the Moorish Science Temple and the Nation of Islam. The 1965 immigration reforms led to more diverse Muslim immigration, including educated individuals from the Middle East, North Africa, and South Asia. In 1992, there were around 5,000 Muslims in Minnesota, corresponding to about 0.1% of the overall population.

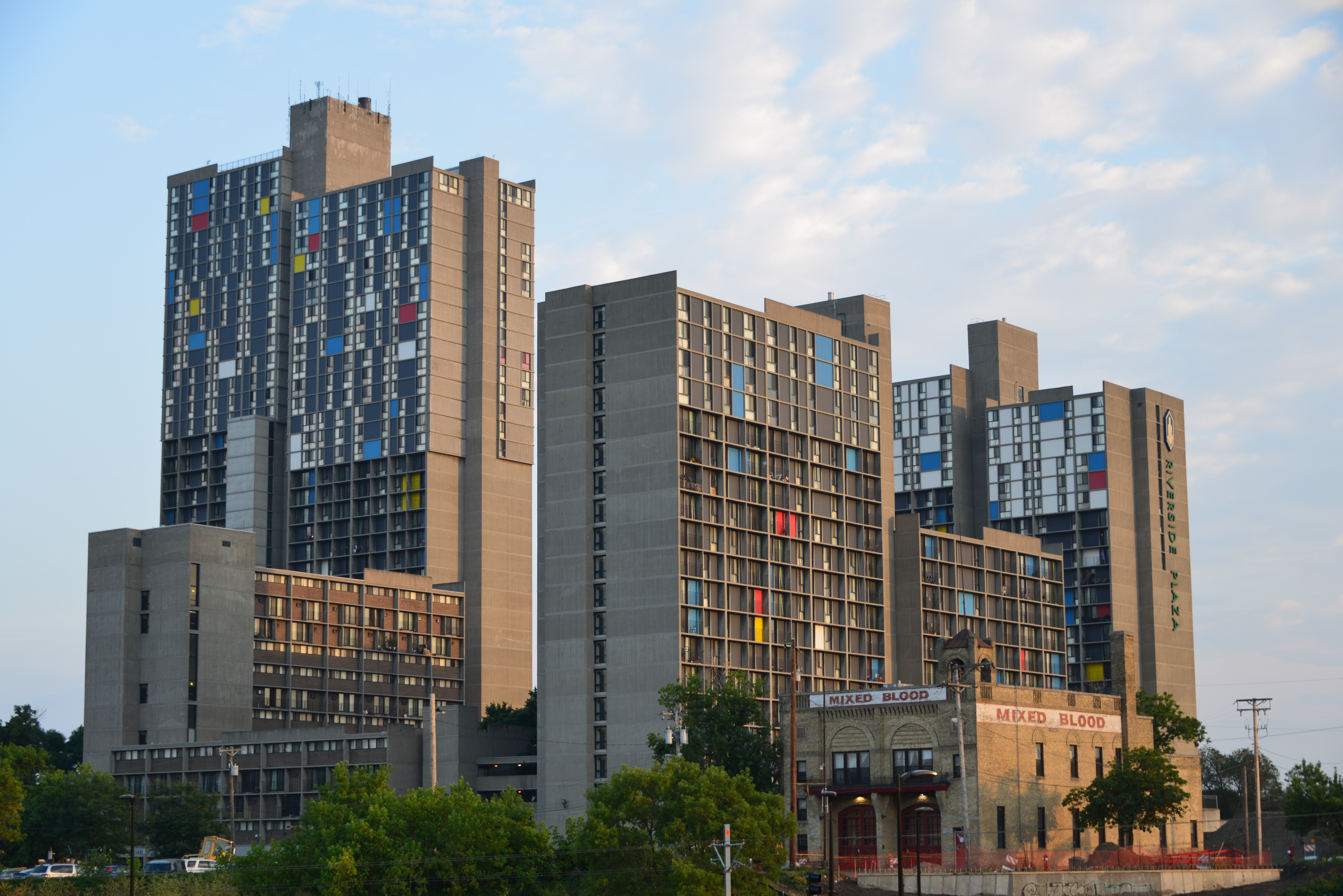
The Riverside Plaza in Minneapolis is a densely populated enclave of several thousand Somali Muslims.

In late 20th and early 21st centuries, civil wars in countries like Bosnia-Herzegovina, Ethiopia, Somalia, and Sudan led to more Muslims arriving in Minnesota as refugees. The Masjid Al Rahman in Bloomington was the first purpose-built mosque in Minnesota, opening in 1999. Most other mosques in the state are found in converted spaces. For example, the first Somali-run mosque (Dar al-Hijrah Islamic Civic Center) was established in 1998 the Cedar-Riverside neighborhood from a former knitting factory. Results of a 2014 Pew Research report put the Muslim population of Minnesota at 1%, while more recent estimates put the number between 140,000 and 200,000 (about 2.5–3%).

Today, Somalis are by far the largest Muslim immigrant group in Minnesota. In 2020, a little over 91,000 Somalis lived in Minnesota. The vast majority live in urban areas, especially Minneapolis, Saint Paul, other Twin Cities suburbs, and St. Cloud. The flow of Somali refugees into Minnesota slowed significantly in 2017 following Executive Order 13780, which restricted travel from Somalia, among other countries. In 2023, Minneapolis became the first major city U.S. city to permit the adhan to be broadcast year-round. Subsequently, there was a noticeable increase in attacks on mosques in the Twin Cities, which some Muslim leaders attribute to the new ordinance.

Following the Taliban takeover of Afghanistan in 2021, the Afghan population has risen from 300 to over 1,500. In the months following the Gaza war, local mosques reported a modest uptick in converts to Islam across Minnesota.

Minnesota has over seventy-six mosques, Islamic schools, and community centers. Half of all Minnesota's mosques are in the Twin Cities, with a majority having been founded by Somalis. A large Muslim-focused community project in the northern suburb of Lino Lakes is being considered. The 156-acre Madinah Lakes project aims to build over 400 homes, businesses, and a mosque for about 10,000 people. The project has garnered significant pushback from local residents and municipal officials. Another suburban housing development aimed at the East African Muslim community in Lakeville is under investigation by the state's Department of Labor and the Attorney General for predatory real estate practices.

Muslims in Minnesota are politically active, with notable figures like Keith Ellison and Ilhan Omar. The state's chapter of the Council on American-Islamic Relations (CAIR) is one of the most active in the US, and encouraged Muslims to vote "Uncommitted" in the 2024 Democratic presidential primary to protest Joe Biden's handling of the Gaza war. Although many Somali Muslims voted in favor of the 2012 Minnesota Marriage Amendment, which aimed to ban same-sex marriage, prominent figures in the state's Muslim community, such as Mohamud Noor, opposed it.

=== Judaism ===
Minnesota's first Jewish community formed in St. Paul in the mid-19th century. The Mt. Zion Hebrew Association was established in 1856, which received its charter from the territorial government in 1857 and established Minnesota's first Jewish cemetery. From 1880 to 1930, a wave of Eastern European Jewish immigrants arrived, who settled primarily in the "West Side" of St. Paul. Eastern European Jews began arriving in large numbers in 1882. By 1936, the Jewish population in Minneapolis was estimated to be 16,260, or about 3.5 percent of the city's total. At this time, nearly 70 percent of Minneapolis's Jewish residents, or 11,018 individuals, lived in what is now known as the Near North area. Antisemitism peaked in the 1930s and 1940s, notably during the 1938 gubernatorial election. However, the situation improved significantly in 1945 with the reforms introduced by Mayor Hubert Humphrey in Minneapolis. These reforms led to increased political activism among Jews, resulting in the election of several Jewish mayors and senators, despite Jews making up less than 1% of the state's population.

In 2019, a Brandeis University community study of the nine-county Minneapolis–Saint Paul metropolitan area estimated that there were 34,500 Jewish households (5% of all households), home to 88,400 people, of whom 64,800 are Jewish. Among Jewish adults in the Twin Cities who affiliate with a denomination, the largest share affiliate with the Reform movement (30%), followed by the Conservative movement (18%). A significant portion of Jewish adults in the Twin Cities, 47%, do not identify with a specific denomination and indicate they are secular, "just Jewish," or have no specific denomination. 31% of Twin Cities Jewish households belong to a synagogue or another Jewish worship community. However, 63% of Jewish adults attended services at least once in the past year, and 41% attended a service or program at a synagogue.

The Jewish Virtual Library estimated the Jewish population in all of Minnesota was about 65,900 (1% of all adults) in 2019, and Pew reported that Judaism is practiced by between 0.5% and 1%.

The University of Minnesota has a Center for Jewish Studies and a Hillel chapter. Notable Jews hailing from Minnesota include musician Bob Dylan, Mayor of Minneapolis Jacob Frey, and U.S. senators Al Franken, Norm Coleman, and Paul Wellstone.

=== Eastern religions ===
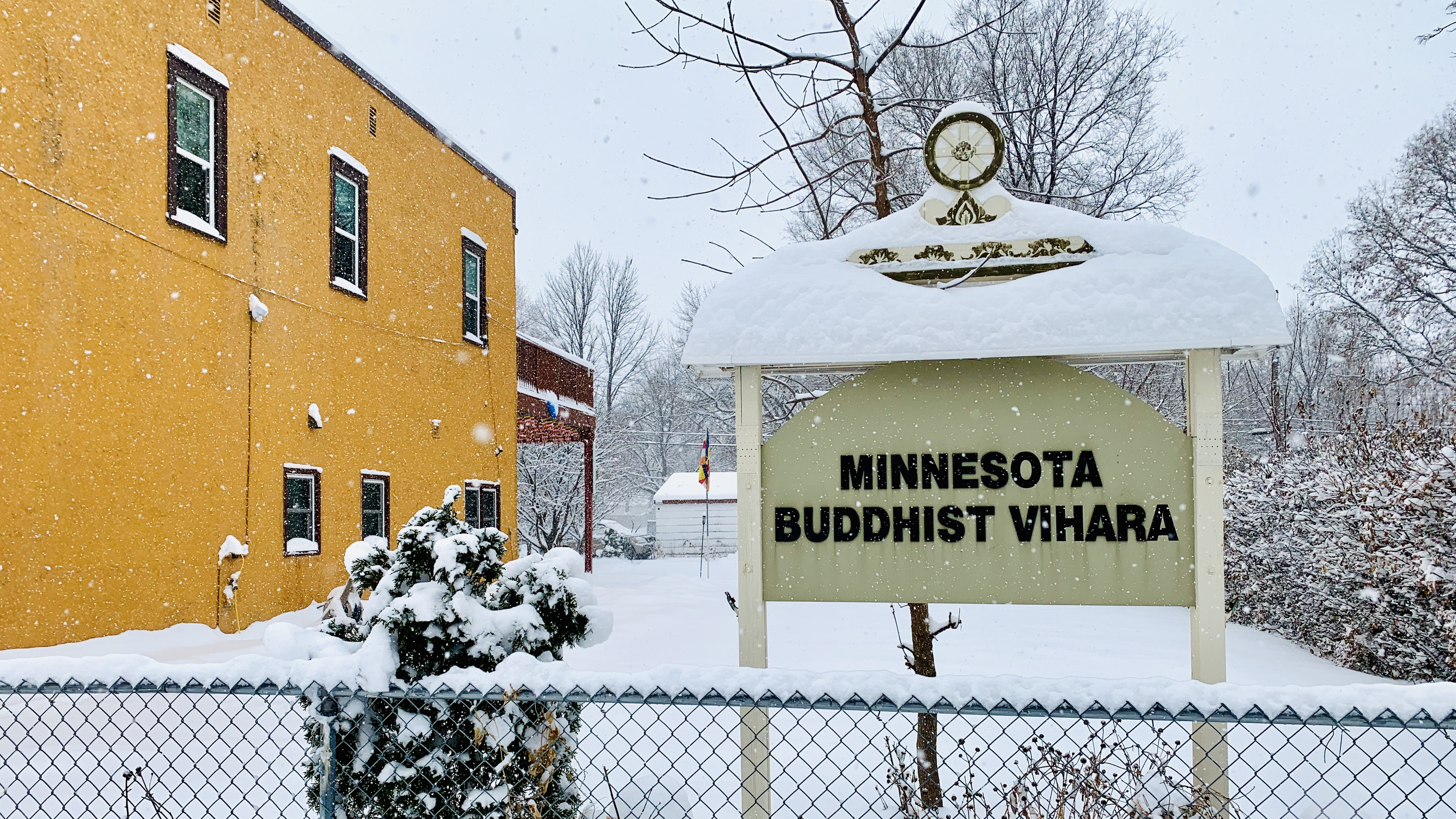
Minnesota Buddhist Vihara in McKinley, Minneapolis.

Minnesota has about 50,000 Hindu residents, mainly in the Twin Cities. This includes Indians, Bengalis, Nepalis and Bhutanese (Lhotshampa), among other groups. The Hindu Society of Minnesota built North America's largest Hindu temple, the Hindu Temple of Minnesota, in 2006. This was later surpassed by the Swaminarayan Akshardham in New Jersey.

Minnesota also has about 10,000 Cambodians, mostly Theravada Buddhists from the Khmer ethnic group. Most live in the Twin Cities and fled Democratic Kampuchea during the 1970s. The U.S. accepted Cambodian refugees from 1979, following the overthrow of Pol Pot. A proportion of the state's 20,000 Karen refugees from then Socialist Burma (Myanmar) are also Buddhist, with influences of animism. In 2019, a Buddhist monastery was inaugurated in Chisago City modeled after the Shwedagon Pagoda in Myanmar. Finally, Tibetan Buddhism is practiced by about 3,000 first and second-generation immigrants from the Tibet region.

The Sikh Society of Minnesota, established in the 1980s, serves a community of 400-500 families.

Jainism in Minnesota began in the 1960s and 1970s, including the first organized Samvatsari Pratikramman in 1974. The Jain Center of Minnesota was established in 1989. In 2007, a new Jain Mini Temple within the Hindu Society of Minnesota was inaugurated. The Jain Center estimates a membership of around 100 families.

=== Baháʼí Faith ===
As of recent estimates, there are about 2,000 Bahá'ís in Minnesota, with 17 Local Spiritual Assemblies. The most significant activity centers are in Eagan, Duluth, St. Paul, and Minneapolis, with Minneapolis itself home to around 200 official Bahá'í members.

The Minneapolis Bahá'í community traces its origins to 1903 with the conversion of Albert Hall (who later served as chairman of the Baháʼí House of Worship in Chicago) and Dr. Homer Harper. Abdu'l-Bahá visited Minneapolis in 1912, when the local Bahá'í population was just five individuals. By 1919, this number grew to 42. In 1938, under the guidance of Shoghi Effendi, the first Local Spiritual Assembly was established in Minneapolis. By 1979, the Bahá'í population in Minneapolis reached about 80.

The Bahá'í Center in Minneapolis, located in the Central neighborhood, is a block away from where George Floyd was murdered in 2020.

=== New religious movements ===
Eckankar is a new religious movement founded by Paul Twitchell. The Temple of Eck, which was built in 1990 and serves as the religion's global headquarters, is located in Chanhassen. ECKists, followers of Eckankar, believe in the direct personal experience of the Divine through the Light and Sound of God.

The Asatru Folk Assembly, a neopagan group, operates a hof in Murdock, Minnesota.

== Irreligion ==
About 20% of Minnesotans identify as having no religion. This makes it the fastest-growing "religion" in the state and nation. While 20% identify as unaffiliated, it's important to note that not all are atheists. About 7% are identified as atheists or agnostics. Irreligion is more prevalent in urban areas like Minneapolis and St. Paul, where 30% of the population is unaffiliated, compared to 15% in rural areas. Younger generations tend to be less religious than older generations. Among Minnesotans aged 18–29, 35% are unaffiliated, while only 10% of those aged 65 and older are.

Chris Stedman, a professor at Augsburg University in Minneapolis, is involved in studying the irreligious population. Several organizations cater to the growing nonreligious population in Minnesota, including Minnesota Atheists, Central Minnesota Freethinkers, and the Humanist Society of Minnesota.

== Religion in prisons and jails ==
The prison population in Minnesota is far more religiously diverse than the state at large. The Minnesota Department of Corrections reported that in 2023, 44.2% of the state's 8,274 inmates indicated that they were Christian: 8.0% Catholic, 4.3% Lutheran, 2.8% Baptist, and 29.1% identifying as "other Christian". The second largest religion is Islam, accounting for 7.6% of the prison population. Native American religions are 5.5%, and all other religions combined are 12.7%. 29.9% of the inmates indicated that they had no religious preferences or chose not to answer.

In 2024, the construction of the new Itasca County Jail and government center included religious quotes and a large depiction of the Ten Commandments within its facilities. After criticism, including from the Freedom From Religion Foundation (FFRF), the local sheriff announced plans to repaint the religious displays. A year before, the FFRF successfully intervened to prevent the installation of a Ten Commandments display at the Kanabec County Courthouse.

== See also ==
- Religion in the United States
