= Hamse Warfa =

Somali American politician and businessman

Hamse Warfa is a Somali-American politician and businessman who became the highest-ranking African immigrant official in Minnesota's executive branch of the Deputy Commissioner for Workforce Development at the Minnesota Department of Employment and Economic Development (DEED) by Governor Tim Walz, and later he became the first Somali-American presidential appointee in U.S. history, joining the Biden administration as a Senior Advisor in the U.S. State Department's Office of the Under Secretary for Civilian Security, Democracy, and Human Rights..

== Early life and education ==
Hamse Warfa was born in Mogadishu, Somalia. After the outbreak of the Somali Civil War in 1991 disrupted this idyllic life, Warfa and his family fled to Kenya. They spent three and a half years in the Otanga and Dadaab refugee camps.

In 1994, Warfa and his family were resettled in the United States, initially in Colorado, before moving to San Diego. He earned a Bachelor of Arts in Political Science from San Diego State University and later a Master of Science in Organizational Management and Leadership from Springfield College in Massachusetts.

== Career ==
=== Public sector leadership ===
In April 2019, Warfa was appointed Deputy Commissioner for Workforce Development at the Minnesota Department of Employment and Economic Development (DEED) by Governor Tim Walz, becoming the highest-ranking African immigrant official in Minnesota's executive branch. In January 2022, Warfa became the first Somali-American presidential appointee in U.S. history, joining the Biden administration as a Senior Advisor in the U.S. State Department's Office of the Under Secretary for Civilian Security, Democracy, and Human Rights.

=== Business ===
In 2016, he co-founded BanQu Inc., a blockchain-powered software company. Warfa also founded Tayo Consulting Group. In September 2024, Warfa was appointed CEO of World Savvy, an education-focused nonprofit.

Warfa is the author of two books: America Here I Come: A Somali Refugee's Quest for Hope, and The Transformational Leader: Twelve Practices for Driving Lasting Change (2023).

== Publications ==
- America Here I Come: A Somali Refugee's Quest for Hope (2014)
- The Transformational Leader: Twelve Practices for Driving Lasting Change (2023).

=== Op-ed's ===
- Warfa, Hamse. "Warfa: We can't protect democracy if we don't prepare the next generation to defend it". The Minnesota Star Tribune.
- Warfa, Hamse. "Warfa: It's young people who give me hope for the future". The Minnesota Star Tribune.
- Warfa, Hamse (March 11, 2026). "Somali Refugees: Victims of both the terror of war and the war on terror". Hiiraan Online.
