= Ahmed M. Hassan =

American politician

Member of the Clarkston City Council
- Incumbent
- Assumed office 5 November 2013

Personal details
- Born: Somalia
- Party: Independent
- Children: 3
- Education: State University of New York at Old Westbury; Mercer University; DeVry University

Ahmed M. Hassan (Somali: Axmed Xasan, Arabic: احمد حسن) is a Somali American businessman and politician. He is a member of Clarkston, Georgia's city council, the first Somali to hold the position.

== Personal life ==
Hassan hails from the Somaliland region in northwestern Somalia. He later moved to the United States, settling in Clarkston, Georgia.

For his post-secondary education, Hassan received a BA from the State University of New York at Old Westbury. He also studied at Mercer University's Stetson School of Business in Atlanta, where he earned an MBA in finance. Additionally, Hassan holds a master's degree in accounting and financial management with an emphasis on CPA from the Keller Graduate School of Business at DeVry University.

Hassan is married, and has three sons.

== Career ==
=== Early career ===
Hassan has more than two decades of experience in corporate and small businesses.

He is a prominent member of the Somali American community of Atlanta. Hassan has also worked on a volunteer basis for Clarkston's wider immigrant population and for the public cause.

=== Clarkston City Council ===
In 2013, Hassan ran for a seat on the Clarkston City Council. The municipal government presides over one of DeKalb County's youngest and most ethnically diverse cities.

On 5 November 2013, Hassan emerged as one of the top three candidates in the five-way race, winning 19.6 percent of total votes. He defeated fellow candidate Birendra Dhakal by 18 votes, with 215 votes for Hassan and 197 votes for Dhakal. The other two vacant City Council positions were secured by incumbent Dean Moore and Robert Hogan, who received 22.8 percent and 22.3 percent of votes, respectively.

The victory makes Hassan the first Somali to be elected to the Clarkston City Council.
