= U.S. Bank Stadium station =

Light rail station in Minneapolis, Minnesota, U.S.

U.S. Bank Stadium
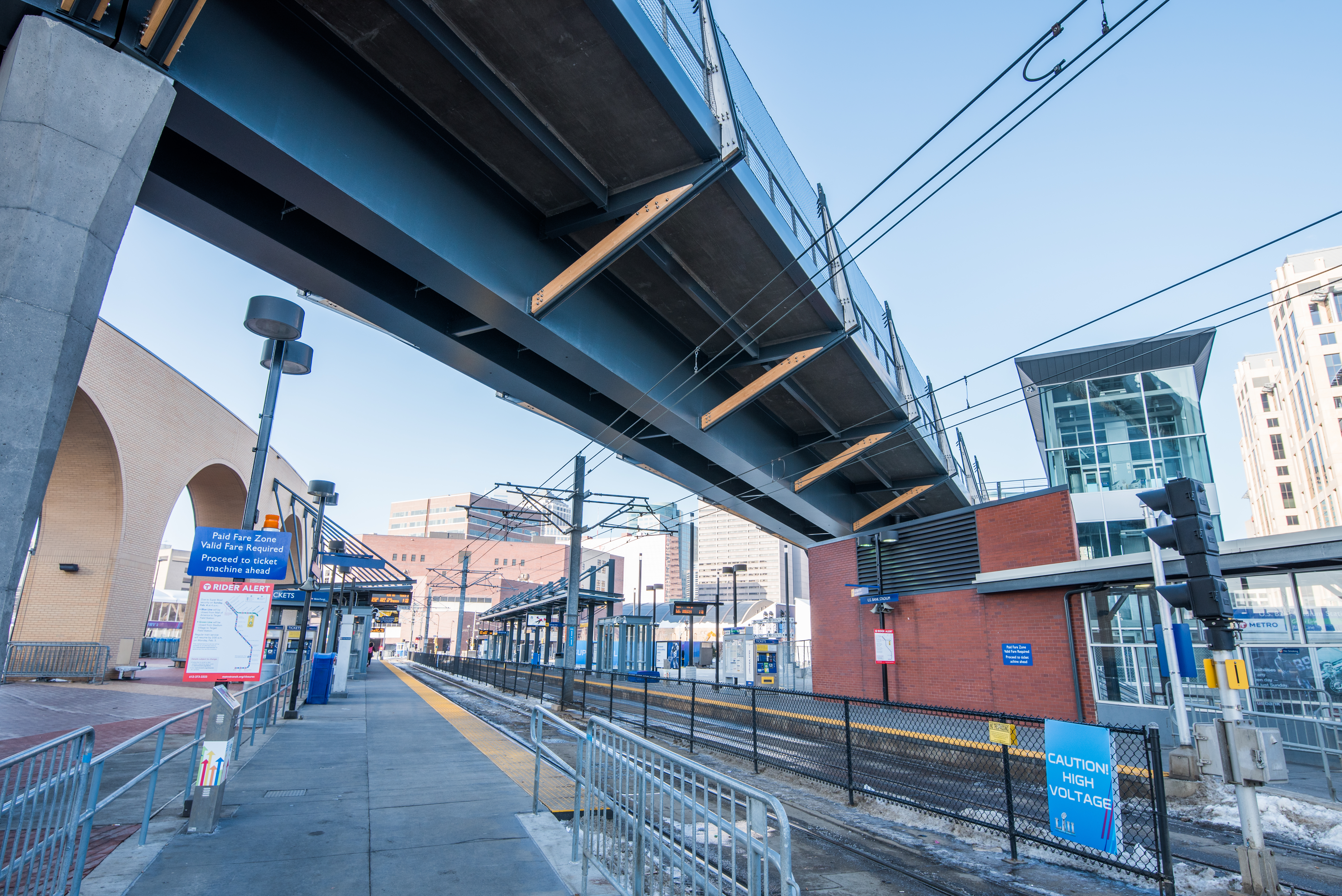
- U.S. Bank Stadium station platforms

General information
- Location: 429 Park Ave South; Minneapolis, Minnesota, U.S.
- Coordinates: 44°58′30″N 93°15′36″W
- Owner: Metro Transit
- Platforms: 2 side platforms
- Tracks: 2
- Connections: Metro Transit: 3

Construction
- Structure type: At-grade
- Accessible: Yes

Other information
- Fare zone: Downtown

History
- Opened: June 26, 2004
- Former names: Downtown East/Metrodome (2004–2013); Downtown East (2013–2016)

Passengers
- 2025: 2,513 daily ▲0.5%
- Rank: 2 out of 37

Services
Preceding station	Metro	Following station
Government Plaza toward Target Field	Blue Line	Cedar–Riverside toward Mall of America
Government Plaza toward Target Field	Green Line	West Bank toward Saint Paul Union Depot
Location

U.S. Bank Stadium station (formerly Downtown East/Metrodome (2004–13) and Downtown East (2014–16)) is a light rail station on the Metro Blue Line and Green Line in Minneapolis, Minnesota.

The station is located next to U.S. Bank Stadium, where the Hubert H. Humphrey Metrodome plaza used to be at the east end of downtown Minneapolis. It is a side-platform station. Service began at this station when the Blue Line opened on June 26, 2004.

In March 2016, the station was renamed to U.S. Bank Stadium station, after the new stadium planned for the Minnesota Vikings; for the station's naming rights, Metro will receive $300,000 annually from the Minnesota Sports Facilities Authority and the team in the form of in-stadium promotions, advertising and marketing support to encourage transit ridership to stadium events.

== Services and connections ==
The station is served by METRO Green and Blue Lines. It is the primary transfer point between the two lines, as it is the last east/south-bound station shared by the two. Green Line trains feature posters reminding airport-bound passengers to change to the Blue Line at Downtown East.

During sporting events at the Metrodome, large crowds used to line up to use the trains. It would take up to an hour for the platforms to return to normal after a big game.

Prior to the opening of the METRO Green Line, the station was the main stop for students traveling to the East Bank and West Bank campuses of the University of Minnesota Twin Cities, as a few frequent bus routes ran to campus nearby. Today, the METRO Green Line light rail runs between Minneapolis and St. Paul and now provides a direct connection to the university. Among buses, only Route 3 now serves the station.

== Pedestrian bridge ==
The Metrodome was torn down in 2014 in preparation for the construction of US Bank Stadium which opened in 2016. A pedestrian bridge to carry US Bank Stadium attendees across the light rail tracks was first approved by the Metropolitan Council in 2015. When the cost was estimated at $7 million in 2015, the Vikings agreed to pay for half of the cost. Bids to construct the bridge were significantly higher than expected boosting the estimated cost to $9.7 million by November 2015. A tight timeline for construction and the impending opening of the stadium in summer 2016 resulted in reduced interest from bidders. The bridge ultimately cost $10.6 million to construct after last minute changes were made to the design.

== Signalling ==
East of this station, past the crossing of 4th Street and Chicago Avenue, trains enter the segment of the line where automatic block signaling (ABS) is used. In contrast, light rail vehicles must obey stop lights in the downtown region. The rail line uses a system of lights which display either vertical or horizontal white bars to the train operator.

The two METRO lines split east of the station, over Interstate 35W.

== Art ==
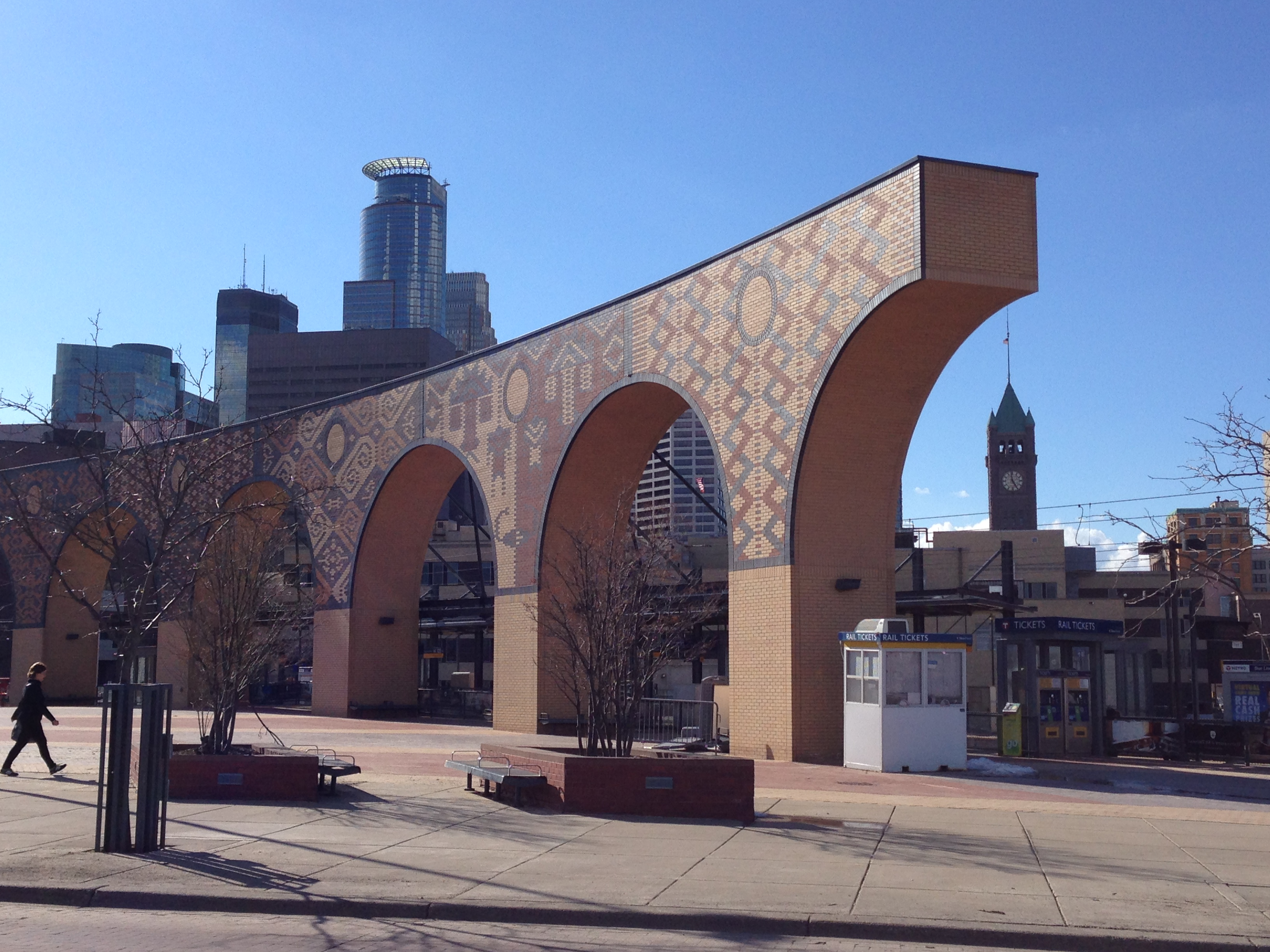
Public art at the station features a set of large arches by Andrew Leicester and Jane Zweig

A major feature of the site is a set of large ornamental arches and the plaza paving design, by artist Andrew Leicester, which stand next to the station. They are meant to reflect the Stone Arch Bridge, a major landmark of the city that crosses the Mississippi River a few blocks away. The patterns in the brickwork are meant to reflect fabric designs worn by 19th century immigrants in the Elliot Park neighborhood.

== Notable places nearby ==
- Downtown East Commons
- Guthrie Theater (3 blocks)
- Hennepin County Medical Center (2 blocks)
- Hiawatha LRT Trail
- Minneapolis Armory (1 block)
- Former Star Tribune Headquarters (1 block)
- Mill City Museum (3 blocks)
- Samatar Crossing
- U.S. Bank Stadium
