= Mohamud Noor =

American politician (born 1977/78)

Mohamud Noor محمود نور
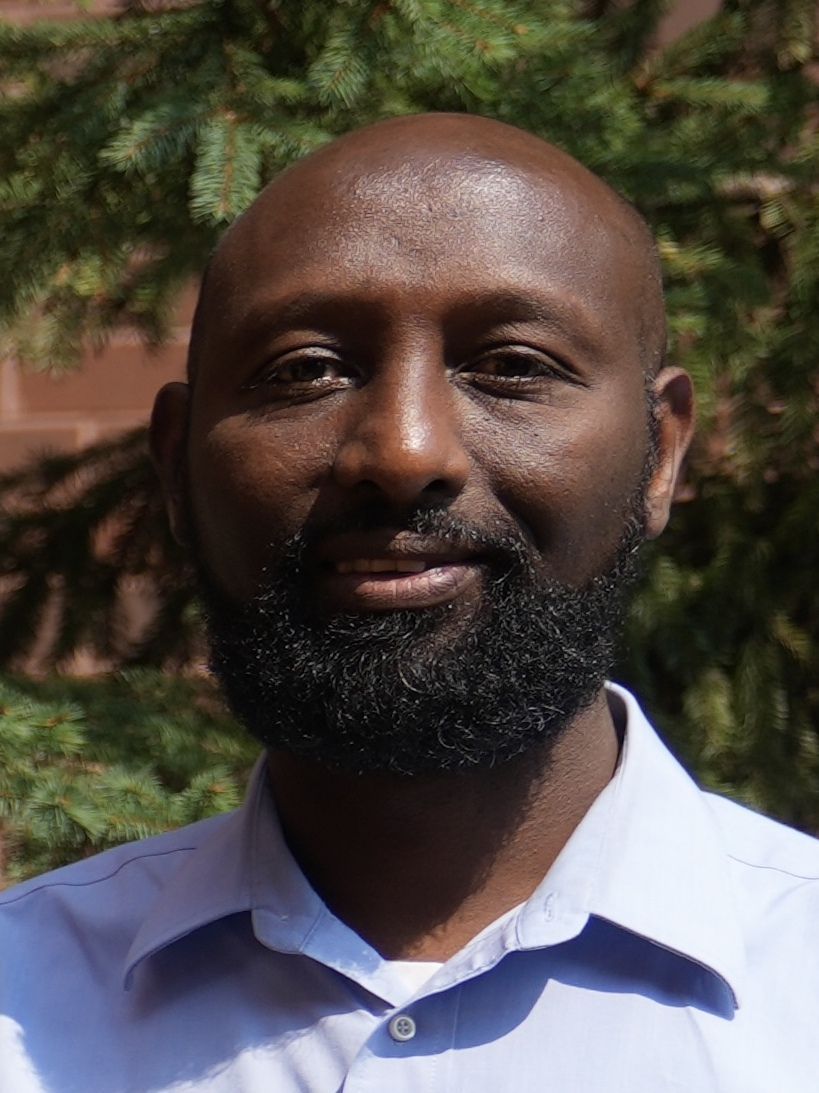

Member of the Minnesota House of Representatives from the 60B district
- Incumbent
- Assumed office January 8, 2019
- Preceded by: Ilhan Omar

Personal details
- Born: 1977 or 1978 (age 47–48) Somalia
- Party: Democratic (DFL)
- Spouse: Farhiya Del
- Children: 4
- Education: Metropolitan State University (B.S.)
- Occupation: Computer scientist; Business consultant; Legislator
- Website: Government website

Mohamud Noor (born 1977 or 1978) is an American politician serving in the Minnesota House of Representatives since 2019. A member of the Democratic–Farmer–Labor Party (DFL), Noor represents District 60B, which includes parts of the city of Minneapolis in Hennepin County.

== Early life, education, and career ==
Noor was born in 1978 in Somalia. Following the start of the civil war, he and his family sought asylum in Kenya. In 1999, they emigrated to the United States, settling in Minnesota.

Noor earned a B.S. in computer science from Metropolitan State University. He was a system administrator for the Minnesota Department of Human Services.

Noor was the former director of the Confederation of Somali Community in Minnesota, a Minneapolis-based NGO serving immigrants. In that role, he advocated for funding for Somali youth programs, job skills programs, childcare programs, and mental health services. He criticized Republicans and Donald Trump for rising anti-Islamic sentiment in 2016, and praised President Barack Obama for visiting a mosque and speaking out in support of Muslim Americans.

== Prior local campaigns ==
=== Minneapolis public school board ===
In 2010, Noor ran for a seat on the board of the Minneapolis Public Schools, finishing in fifth place. In December 2013, he was appointed to the Minneapolis school board, beating Ubah Jama by a 5-3 vote after the death of Hussein Samatar. He resigned from the school board to run for the Minnesota House of Representatives in 2014.

=== Minnesota Senate ===
In 2011, Noor lost to Kari Dzeidzic in a special election DFL primary for an open Minnesota Senate seat created by the retirement of nine-term incumbent Larry Pogemiller.

=== Minneapolis City Council Ward 6 ===
In 2017, Noor challenged incumbent Abdi Warsame for City Council in Minneapolis Ward 6. He said he was "extremely disappointed" with Warsame's work on the council and that he would focus on jobs, housing, and police reform, and engage with constituents more than Warsame. At the DFL Ward 6 caucus, Warsame won the most delegates, and Noor joined another challenger, Flynn Forslund, in asking that the caucus results be thrown out. Noor pulled out of the endorsement convention, citing "a potential safety risk for participants".

In September, Noor and Mayor Betsy Hodges endorsed each other. He was also endorsed by state legislators Ilhan Omar, Karen Clark, Raymond Dehn, Jim Davnie, Scott Dibble and Patricia Torres Ray.

Noor lost to Wasame in November, and accused Warsame's campaign of violating election day and campaign laws. He said he would "fight to make sure every vote is counted, and the numerous irregularities that were reported are fully investigated". Noor requested a "discretionary" recount paid for by his own funds. After a recount left the result unchanged, an attorney for Noor withdrew the challenge, but Noor filed a personal lawsuit asking a judge to invalidate the election. He claimed to have evidence that "at least 100 people appear to have voted in our election who do not live in Ward 6". A Hennepin County judge dismissed the lawsuit in December 2017.

== Minnesota House of Representatives ==
Noor was elected to the Minnesota House of Representatives in 2018 and has been reelected every two years since. He first ran in 2014, unsuccessfully challenging 21-term incumbent Phyllis Kahn in the DFL primary. In 2016, Noor again challenged Kahn, as did Ilhan Omar. The DFL convention ended with no endorsement, but Omar defeated both Khan and Noor in the DFL primary and won the general election. In 2018 Noor ran for the seat again, after Omar announced she would not seek reelection in order to run for Minnesota's 5th congressional district. Noor won both the DFL primary and the general election. He has been reelected in every election since.

Noor has served as chair of the Human Services Finance Committee since 2023 and also sits on the Higher Education Finance and Policy, Human Services Policy, and Ways and Means Committees. He chaired the Workforce and Business Development Finance and Policy Committee from 2021 to 2022, and was vice chair of the Jobs and Economic Development Finance Committee from 2019 to 2020.

=== Political positions ===
Noor has called for the legislature to address racial disparities in health care, education, unemployment, and housing. He supported efforts to pass the Driver's Licenses for All bill, which allows undocumented immigrants in the state to obtain a driver's license, calling it a "moral obligation".

Noor criticized President Donald Trump for his anti-Somali rhetoric and posts on social media ahead of a 2018 visit. He has defended his predecessor, Ilhan Omar, over attacks from Trump and conservatives, comparing them to claims that President Barack Obama was not born in the United States.

Noor's policy priorities were job creation via investments in the green economy, health care issues, and forging partnerships with the University of Minnesota. He also sought to secure more funding for schools, advocated a move away from complete reliance on property taxes, and backed the state government's request for a waiver to get out of No Child Left Behind. He supported interment at Fort Snelling National Cemetery for Hmong veterans of the Vietnam War, as well as the Affordable Care Act. Noor's campaign also supported same-sex marriage. He was endorsed by former Minneapolis mayor R. T. Rybak and several local progressive groups, including the Minnesota Association of Professional Employees, Stonewall DFL, and the Minneapolis Federation of Teachers.

== Electoral history ==
2010 Primary for Minneapolis School Board Director At Large
Party	Candidate	Votes	%
Independent	Richard Mammen	12,699	21.69
Independent	Rebecca Gagnon	8,449	14.43
Independent	Chanda Smith Baker	8,296	14.17
Independent	T. Williams	7,313	12.49
Independent	Mohamud Noor	6,222	10.63
Independent	Shirlynn Lachapelle	4,559	7.79
Independent	Doug Mann	3,941	6.73
Independent	James Everett	3,194	5.45
Independent	Steven C. Lasey	2,625	4.48
Independent	R.E. (Dick) Velner	1,261	2.15
Total votes		58,559	100.00

2011 DFL Primary for Minnesota Senate - District 59 Special Election
Party	Candidate	Votes	%
Democratic (DFL)	Kari Dziedzic	1,965	32.11
Democratic (DFL)	Mohamud Noor	1,626	26.57
Democratic (DFL)	Peter Wagenius	1,089	17.80
Democratic (DFL)	Paul Ostrow	792	12.94
Democratic (DFL)	Jacob Frey	473	7.73
Democratic (DFL)	Alicia Frosch	36	0.59
Total votes		5,981	100.00

2014 DFL Primary for Minnesota State House - District 60B
Party	Candidate	Votes	%
Democratic (DFL)	Phyllis Kahn (incumbent)	2,332	54.47
Democratic (DFL)	Mohamud Noor	1,949	45.53
Total votes		4,281	100.00

2016 DFL Primary for Minnesota State House - District 60B
Party	Candidate	Votes	%
Democratic (DFL)	Ilhan Omar	2,404	40.97
Democratic (DFL)	Mohamud Noor	1,738	29.62
Democratic (DFL)	Phyllis Kahn (incumbent)	1,726	29.62
Total votes		4,281	100.00

2018 DFL Primary for Minnesota State House - District 60B
Party	Candidate	Votes	%
Democratic (DFL)	Mohamud Noor	2,909	39.73
Democratic (DFL)	Peter Wagenius	2,076	28.35
Democratic (DFL)	Cordelia Pierson	1,287	17.58
Democratic (DFL)	Haaris Pasha	374	5.11
Democratic (DFL)	Joshua Preston	335	4.58
Democratic (DFL)	Mary Mellen	257	3.51
Democratic (DFL)	Angelo Jaramillo	84	1.15
Total votes		7,332	100.00

2018 Minnesota State House - District 60B
Party	Candidate	Votes	%
Democratic (DFL)	Mohamud Noor	16,440	86.26
Republican	Joseph Patiño	2,552	13.39
Write-in		67	0.35
Total votes		19,059	100.00
Democratic (DFL) hold			

2020 Minnesota State House - District 60B
Party	Candidate	Votes	%
Democratic (DFL)	Mohamud Noor (incumbent)	16,754	98.06
Write-in		331	1.94
Total votes		17,085	100.00
Democratic (DFL) hold			

2022 Minnesota State House- District 60B
Party	Candidate	Votes	%
Democratic (DFL)	Mohamud Noor (incumbent)	9,039	98.74
Write-in		115	1.26
Total votes		9,154	100.00
Democratic (DFL) hold			

2024 Minnesota State House - District 60B
Party	Candidate	Votes	%
Democratic (DFL)	Mohamud Noor (incumbent)	9,993	82.70
Republican	Abigail Wolters	2,041	16.89
Write-in		50	0.41
Total votes		12,084	100.00
Democratic (DFL) hold			

== Personal life ==
Noor is Muslim. He is married to Farhiya Del, with whom he has four children. The family lives in Minneapolis's Como neighborhood.
