= Hussein Samatar =

Somali-American politician, banker and community organizer in Minneapolis (1964–2013)

Hussein Mohamed Mohamud Samatar
- Xuseen Maxamed Maxamud Samatar حسين سمتر
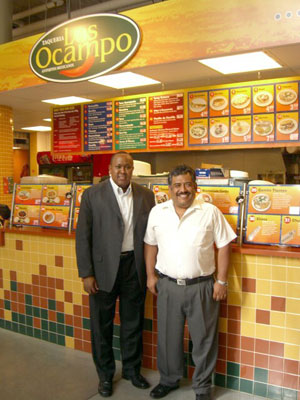
- Samatar, left, with Ramon Leon of the Latino Economic Development Center at the Midtown Global Market in 2011

District 3 Representative on the Minneapolis School Board
- In office 11 January 2011 – 25 August 2013

Personal details
- Born: 1964 Somalia
- Died: 25 August 2013 (aged 48–49) Minneapolis, Minnesota, United States
- Spouse: Ubah Jama
- Children: 4
- Education: Somali National University; University of St. Thomas
- Occupation: banker, community organizer

Hussein Samatar (Somali: Xuseen Samatar, Arabic: حسين ساماتار) (1964 – 25 August 2013) was a Somali American politician, banker and community organizer. He established the African Development Center in 2004, which provided microloans and technical expertise to recent immigrant businesses.

== Personal life ==
Samatar was born in 1964 in Somalia. He grew up in a diverse area in Kismayo, situated in the southern Lower Juba province. Samatar's father had originally moved down from the northeastern Puntland region at the age of twelve, and his mother hailed from the southern town of Afmadow.

Samatar attended high school in Mogadishu. He later studied at the local Somali National University, receiving his undergraduate degree in 1991. His initial goal was to work as an economist, but postponed this following the outbreak of the civil war four days after his graduation.

Samatar then moved to the United States, part of the first wave of Somali emigrants to Minnesota in December 1991. He learned English with the help of a Minneapolis librarian.

Samatar was later accepted at the University of St. Thomas, earning an MBA in Business Administration from the institution. In 2003–2004, he was selected as a Humphrey School of Public Affairs Fellow, and later as a German Marshall Memorial Fellow in 2007. Samatar had also enrolled in the Achieving Excellence in Community Economic Development program at the Harvard Kennedy School of Government, which he successfully completed.

Samatar was married to Ubah Jama, with whom he had four children. On August 25, 2013, Samatar died of complications from leukemia.

== Career ==
In 2002, Samatar was hired by Wells Fargo into their management training program and became a business banker in 2002. He also worked at Northwest Banks. In 2004, he launched the African Development Center, with assistance from the McKnight Foundation and the Pan-African Community Endowment. The organization's purpose was to provide education and financial services to recent immigrants. In 2009, the ADC had a loan portfolio of $10 million.

Samatar later entered public office in 2006, when he was appointed to the Minneapolis Library Board of Trustees by Mayor R.T. Rybak. Four years on, he became the first Somali American in Minnesota and most likely the country to be elected to public office, winning a seat on the Minneapolis School Board. He was inaugurated into the office on 11 January 2011.

Samatar also served on the boards of a number of civic and development organizations. Among these were the Citizens League, Dean's advisory board of the Humphrey Institute at the University of Minnesota, CommonBond Communities and Minneapolis Foundation.

Additionally, Samatar was actively engaged in politics within Somalia. He often wrote on the domestic political scene, endorsing the Hiil Qaran Party as a possible national party to contest elections in the autonomous Somaliland, Puntland, Khatumo, Galmudug and Himan and Heeb regions.

== Legacy ==
In a statement after his death, Minneapolis Mayor R.T. Rybak said one of his greatest pleasures as mayor was getting to know Samatar, whom he described as "an extraordinary leader and a real friend." Praising Samatar's public work, Rybak also said the city planned to name a re-purposed stretch of 5th Street in Samatar's honour. In 2018, Minneapolis opened the highly anticipated mixed-use pedestrian path, naming it Samatar Crossing, to provide greater connection for Cedar-Riverside area residents and visitors to Hiawatha LRT Trail, downtown Minneapolis, and other city neighborhoods. Minneapolis Mayor Jacob Frey remarked at the dedicated ceremony, "This [crossing] is an honor to Samatar who worked to bridge communities. He did it figuratively; this [crossing] is doing it literally."
