= Palmer's Bar =

Bar and music venue in Minneapolis

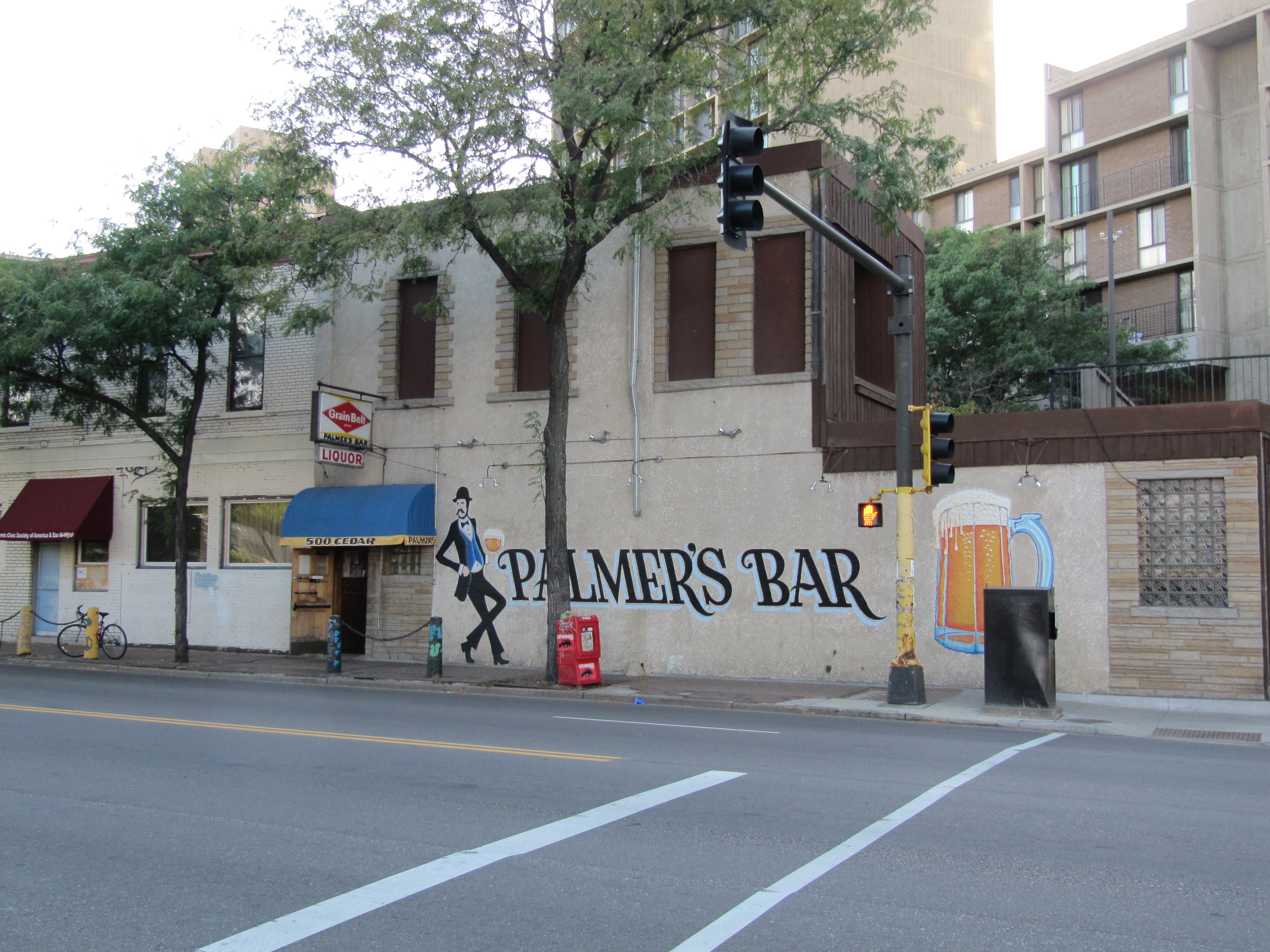
- Interactive map of Palmer's Bar
- Former names: Carl's Bar
- Address: 500 Cedar Avenue
- Location: Minneapolis, Minnesota
- Coordinates: 44.96861°N 93.24722°W
- Owner: Pat and Sarah Dwyer
- Type: Dive bar/tavern

Construction
- Opened: 1906
- Closed: September 14, 2025

Website
- palmers-bar.com

Palmer's Bar was a dive bar and music venue located in the Cedar-Riverside neighborhood of Minneapolis, Minnesota. Known for its strong drinks, the bar often served as a live music venue at night.

== History ==
The bar was founded in 1906 and had over a dozen owners. A speakeasy during the Prohibition Era, the bar is rumored to have once had a secret tunnel connecting it to 5 Corners Saloon (later known as Nomad World Pub and eventually as Part Wolf before becoming vacant as of 2022). In the 1930s, it was named Carl's Bar and a brothel operated upstairs. The bar was named Palmer's in 1950 by then owner Henry Palmer. A Mr. Folta ran the bar from 1959 to 1975. His son Roger Folta co-owned the bar from 1975 to 1996. Keith Berg and Lisa Hammer purchased the bar in 2001.

Under Berg and Hammer's ownership, the bar remained open every day of the year. The bar shared a wall with a mosque, the Dar Al-Hijrah Islamic Civic Center. Scenes for the 2005 indie film Factotum were filmed inside Palmer's.

During the summer, Palmer's hosted a music festival known as "Palmfest". Musicians "Spider" John Koerner, Charlie Parr, Willie Murphy, and Cornbread Harris have played the venue. Local blues musicians Koerner, Dave "Snaker" Ray, and Tony Glover of Koerner, Ray & Glover also played the venue and would also gather at Palmer's after their shows. Bonnie Raitt frequented the bar while she was recording her debut album.

The bar was used as a filming location, including the 1990 film Old Explorers and the 2005 film Factotum, based on the Charles Bukowski novel.

Spider John Koerner was a frequent performer and fixture at the bar, reportedly spending so much time there that he had his newspaper delivered there. When he officially retired in 2023, Koerner donated one of his guitars, a 12-string Epiphone, to the bar, where it was on display in a glass case. When Palmer's closed in 2025, the guitar was gifted to the nearby Cedar Cultural Center, where it is showcased in the lobby.

Palmer's had a "wall of shame", listing people who have been 86'd from the bar. There was also a "Wall of Deceased" that featured former owner Keith Berg, who died in September 2015.

The bar officially closed on September 14th, 2025, with a day-long event featuring multiple local bands spanning several genres who have played at the bar over the years. Playing at the bar has long been considered a Rite of passage for many local bands, particularly in the punk scene.

== Reception ==
Esquire magazine named Palmer's one of the best bars in the United States in 2014. The magazine recommended a bourbon neat with a beer back and said of the bar, "There are dives and dives in this world. There's the type Guy Fieri calls out, old joints that might not feel like they need to get their hair done before seeing company but are nonetheless fundamentally clean and comfortable and unchallenging. Then there's Palmer's." They praised the bar's Wall of Shame, their outdoor garden, and the cheap drinks. Following the listing, owner Berg indicated he would preserve the bar's character and inform the staff that there would be "no bow ties or blenders."

== See also ==
- List of dive bars
