= March 1963 (album) =

2010 album by Spider John Koerner, recorded in 1963

Live album by John Koerner
- Released: November 9, 2010
- Recorded: March 24, 1963
- Genre: Folk, blues
- Length: 41:31
- Label: Nero's Neptune
- Producer: Mark Trehus

John Koerner chronology
Live @ The 400 Bar (2009)	March 1963 (2010)	What's Left of Spider John (2013)

March 1963 is an album by folk and blues musician John Koerner, released in 2010.

== History ==
Following a ten-hour studio session with friends Dave Ray and Tony Glover on March 24, 1963, for the album Blues, Rags and Hollers, Koerner did a set at a local folk club and then an interview and performance for a Milwaukee radio station. Producer Mark Trehus acquired the tape of the radio performance several decades later. "Just the idea that there was unreleased recordings, by the guy I consider to be possibly the greatest living practitioner of American folk music in America today, was just exciting beyond belief for me," Trehus said.

Mark Trehus, owner of the Minneapolis record store Treehouse Records and a longtime fan of Koerner, released the album on his label Nero's Neptune Records, along with a CD reissue of Koerner and Willie Murphy's 1972 album Music Is Just a Bunch of Notes which included a video of Koerner's experimental film The Secret of Sleep.

== Reception ==
Professional ratings
Review scores
Source	Rating
Allmusic	3.5/5 stars

Allmusic music critic Steve Leggett wrote of the album "Koerner played a dozen or so songs that night in his half-traditional, half-revisionist style accompanied by his charging 12-string guitar, harmonica interludes, and plenty of foot stomping. “Duncan & Brady” is an onrushing delight and there’s an early version of “Southbound Train” here, too, along with several other gems."

== Track listing ==
All songs by John Koerner unless otherwise noted.

1. "Interview" – 0:39
2. "Duncan and Brady" (traditional) – 3:31
3. "Southbound Train" – 2:36
4. "Hangman" (Lead Belly) – 3:02
5. "Rock Me" – 3:14
6. "Too Bad Blues" – 2:17
7. "Guitar Fools" – 2:09
8. "Creepy John" – 2:57
9. "You've Got to Be Careful" – 2:35
10. "Interview" – 0:29
11. "Good Time Charlie" – 1:48
12. "Ramblin' Blues" – 3:07
13. "Ramblin' Blues" + untitled instrumental (edited) – 13:07

== Personnel ==
- "Spider" John Koerner – guitar, harmonica, vocals
- Mark Trehus – producer
- Tony Glover – liner notes
- Stefan Kren – editing
- Ed Nunn – cover photo
- Brad Wolstad – design
