= Raised by Humans =

1992 album by Spider John Koerner

Studio album by "Spider" John Koerner
- Released: March 18, 1992
- Recorded: Minnesota Public Radio Station Studio M, St. Paul, MN
- Genre: Folk
- Length: 44:16
- Label: Red House RHR 44
- Producer: Eric Peltoniemi

"Spider" John Koerner chronology
Nobody Knows the Trouble I've Been (1986)	Raised by Humans (1992)	StarGeezer (1996)

Raised by Humans is an album by folk artist "Spider" John Koerner, released in 1992. It was recorded live to two-track tape at Minnesota Public Radio Station Studio M, in St. Paul, Minnesota.

== Reception ==
Professional ratings
Review scores
Source	Rating
Allmusic	4/5 stars
The Encyclopedia of Popular Music	3/4 stars

In his Allmusic review, critic William Ruhlmann stated, "He sings in an assured, rhythmic voice that has taken on a certain gruffness since the early days of Koerner, Ray & Glover more than 30 years ago, making it all the more appropriate to the often familiar songs and enabling him to create his own distinct interpretations. He doesn't need to make albums frequently, as long as the ones he does make are as enjoyable as this one."

== Track listing ==
All songs traditional unless otherwise noted.

1. "Prelude" – 0:23
2. "Summer of '88" (John Koerner) – 5:32
3. "The Young Man Who Wouldn't Hoe Corn" – 1:50
4. "The Water Is Wide" – 4:21
5. "Titanic" – 4:01
6. "Boll Weevil" – 3:15
7. "The Farmer's Curst Wife" – 2:38
8. "Santy Anno" – 2:42
9. "More Pretty Women Than One" (Guthrie, Koerner) – 2:34
10. "Midnight Special" (Lead Belly) – 2:37
11. "The Fox" – 2:41
12. "Old Smoky" – 4:31
13. "Everybody's Going for the Money" (Koerner) – 2:45
14. "Ezekiel" – 3:29
15. "Poem" (Koerner) – 0:57

== Personnel ==
- "Spider" John Koerner – guitar, harmonica (4, 9, 10), vocals
- Marc Anderson – percussion, drums
- Dakota Dave Hull – percussion, vocals, National steel guitar (2, 4, 5, 6, 9, 10, 14)
- Willie Murphy – bass, percussion, piano, vocals
- Dean Magraw – guitar (2, 8, 11, 12, 13, 14)
- Peter Ostroushko – fiddle, mandolin, vocals
- Dave Moore – harmonica (11, 13), percussion, accordion
- John "Mr. Bones" Burrell – percussion

Production notes

- Eric Peltoniemi – producer
- Craig Thorson – engineer
- Paul Baron – engineer, assistant engineer, post production
- Linda Beauvais – artwork, design
- Bob Feldman – executive producer
- Tom Mudge – engineer
- Marc Norberg – photography
