= Nobody Knows the Trouble I've Been =

1986 album by Spider John Koerner

Studio album by "Spider" John Koerner
- Released: January 1986
- Recorded: Creation Audio, Minneapolis, MN
- Genre: Folk
- Length: 43:12
- Label: Red House RHR 12
- Producer: Dakota Dave Hull

"Spider" John Koerner chronology
Some American Folk Songs Like They Used To (1974)	Nobody Knows the Trouble I've Been (1986)	Raised by Humans (1992)

Nobody Knows the Trouble I've Been is an album by folk artist "Spider" John Koerner released in 1986. The album was recorded in one evening at Creation Audio studios in Minneapolis, Minnesota.

== Reception ==
Professional ratings
Review scores
Source	Rating
Allmusic	4.5/5 stars
The Encyclopedia of Popular Music	3/4 stars

In his Allmusic review, music critic Richard Meyer wrote, "Spider John Koerner sings and plays (12-string guitar) with a knowing but commanding casual authority that brings this material to life brilliantly. The music jumps out of the speaker so effortlessly you can appreciate the fun and dark side of these old songs."

== Track listing ==
All songs traditional unless otherwise noted.

1. "Cotton-Eyed Joe" – 0:38
2. "Sail Away Ladies" – 2:54
3. "Acres of Clams" – 4:10
4. "Black Dog" – 3:28
5. "Froggie Went a-Courtin'" – 4:16
6. "The Old Chisholm Trail" – 3:22
7. "The Leather-Winged Bat" – 2:12
8. "Red Apple Juice" – 3:12
9. "Worried Rambler" (John Koerner) – 3:58
10. "What's a Matter with the Mill" – 2:29
11. "Shenandoah" – 3:02
12. "The Roving Gambler" – 2:41
13. "St. James Infirmary" (Joe Primrose, traditional) – 3:08
14. "Irene" (Lead Belly, Alan Lomax) – 3:00
15. "Cotton-Eyed Joe (Reprise)" – 0:42

== Personnel ==
- "Spider" John Koerner – guitar, harmonica, vocals
- John "Mr. Bones" Burrell – percussion
- Tony Glover – harmonica on "The Leather-Winged Bat" and "Red Apple Juice"
- Dakota Dave Hull – guitar
- Willie Murphy – bass
- Peter Ostroushko – mandolin
- Chip Taylor Smith – fiddle
- Butch Thompson – piano

Production notes

- Dakota Dave Hull – producer
- Eric Peltoniemi – executive producer
- Steve Wiese – engineer
- Gregg Vershay – photography
- George Ostroushko – artwork, design
- Marge Ostroushko – assistant producer
- Dan Corrigan – photography
- John Hanson – design
