= Some American Folk Songs Like They Used To =

Studio album by "Spider" John Koerner, Willie and the Bumblebees
- Released: October 1974
- Genre: Folk
- Label: Sweetjane

"Spider" John Koerner, Willie and the Bumblebees chronology
Music Is Just a Bunch of Notes (1972)	Some American Folk Songs Like They Used To (1974)	Nobody Knows the Trouble I've Been (1986)

Professional ratings
Review scores
Source	Rating
The Encyclopedia of Popular Music	3/4 stars

Some American Folk Songs Like They Used To is an album by folk artist "Spider" John Koerner, released in 1974. Guests on the album include fellow Koerner, Ray & Glover members Dave "Snaker" Ray and Tony "Little Sun" Glover.

== Reception ==
Music writer David Dicaire, in his book The Folk Music Revival, 1958–1970, wrote that the album "announced a shift to more traditional folk songs rather than the blues-drenched material of prior releases and what fans had come to expect from him. It ignited his career at a time when folk was in serious decline."

== Track listing ==
=== Side one ===
1. "The Farmer's Curst Wife"
2. "The Dodger"
3. "Hallelujah! I'm a Bum"
4. "Stewball"
5. "The Young Man Who Wouldn't Hoe Corn"
6. "Days of '49"
7. "10,000 Years Ago"
8. "Grunt 'n Groan and the New Cave"

=== Side two ===
1. "Jack of Diamonds"
2. "Abduloah Bulbul Amir"
3. "Go Down Moses"
4. "Casey Jones"
5. "Danville Girl"
6. "Careless Love"
7. "When First unto This Country"
8. "Grunt n' Groan and the New Wheel"

== Personnel ==
- "Spider" John Koerner – guitar, harmonica, vocals
- Tony Glover – harmonica on "Stewball", "Jack of Diamonds", "Danville Girl" and "When First unto This Country"
- Dave Ray – slide guitar, background vocals on "Stewball", "Jack of Diamonds" and "Danville Girl"
