= Spider Blues =

Studio album by "Spider" John Koerner
- Released: May 1965
- Genre: Blues
- Label: Elektra EKL-290 (mono) EKS-7290 (stereo)

"Spider" John Koerner chronology
Spider Blues (1965)	Running, Jumping, Standing Still (1969)

Spider Blues is the debut solo album by blues artist "Spider" John Koerner, released in 1965. He was a member of the loose-knit blues trio Koerner, Ray & Glover at the time of its release.

== History ==
As a member of the blues trio Koerner, Ray & Glover, Koerner was recording on the Elektra label. While recording the trio's albums Lots More Blues, Rags and Hollers and The Return of Koerner, Ray & Glover, he recorded a number of solo tracks. These tracks were assembled into Koerner's debut solo album. He also appeared at the Newport Folk Festival that same year, accompanied by trio member Tony Glover.

In his subsequent releases, his style changed as he turned from the blues to traditional folk music. In a 2000 interview, Koerner said, "I finally decided I was not a blues guy. How could I be? I was too young and too white, all that shit. So I took a year off and when I started playing again, I treated the subject in general as folk music. It's a new culture; it's not music being made on a back porch anymore."

Spider Blues was reissued on CD in 2010 by Wounded Bird Records.

== Reception ==
Professional ratings
Review scores
Source	Rating
The Encyclopedia of Popular Music	3/4 stars
Jazz Monthly	(no rating)

In his 1965 Jazz Monthly review, music critic Albert McCarthy excoriated the album and wrote, "This is, without any doubt, one of the worst records I have had to review for many a long day. In a sleeve note notable for the inane quotes from Koerner himself, Paul Nelson of The Little Sandy Review, which I understand is one of the better folk publications, makes the remarkable claim that 'Koerner's art is like Chaplin's, as great and lasting as it is entertaining'. I nominate this as the most absurd remark of the year in the sleeve note field. In fact, Koerner is a passably competent guitarist, a poor harmonica player and a quite dreadful singer."

On the other hand, in the mid-late 1960s radio station WBCN in Boston used to regularly play "Rent Party Rag" on the first of every month.

== Track listing ==
All songs by John Koerner unless otherwise noted.

=== Side one ===
1. "Good Luck Child" – 2:07
2. "I Want to Be Your Partner" – 3:07
3. "Nice Legs" – 2:27
4. "Spider Blues" – 2:17
5. "Corrina" – 3:15
6. "Shortnin' Bread" (Traditional) – 2:08
7. "Ramblin' and Tumblin'" – 3:12
8. "Delia Holmes" (Traditional) – 2:54

=== Side two ===
1. "Need a Woman" – 2:05
2. "I Want to Do Something" – 3:35
3. "Baby, Don't Come Back" – 2:39
4. "Hal C. Blake" – 1:42
5. "Things Ain't Right" – 3:30
6. "Rent Party Rag" – 9:29

== Personnel ==
- "Spider" John Koerner – guitar, harmonica, kazoo, vocals
- Tony "Little Sun" Glover – harmonica on "Good Luck Child", "Spider Blues", "Things Ain't Right"
- Paul Nelson – liner notes
