= What's Left of Spider John =

2013 album by Spider John Koerner

Studio album by John Koerner
- Released: 2013
- Recorded: 20 and 23 July 2012, Studio 65, London, UK
- Genre: Folk, blues
- Label: Hornbeam

John Koerner chronology
March 1963 (2010)	What's Left of Spider John (2013)

What's Left of Spider John is an album by folk and blues musician John Koerner, released in 2013. The album was recorded in mono through valve microphones and mixed live to tape using vintage Ampex equipment.

== Reception ==
Professional ratings
Review scores
Source	Rating
The Guardian	4/5 stars

Writing for The Guardian, music critic Robin Denselow wrote of the album "Whether backed by Chip Taylor Smith's fiddle or accompanied only by bones percussion, his approach is always no-nonsense, rhythmic and gutsy."

== Track listing ==
1. "The Dodger" (Traditional)
2. "The Leather-Winged Bat" (Traditional)
3. "Phoebe" (Traditional)
4. "Running, Jumping, Standing Still" (John Koerner, Willie Murphy)
5. "Ezekiel" (Traditional)
6. "Days Of ’49" (Traditional)
7. "What’s The Matter With The Mill?" (Memphis Minnie)
8. "Stewball" (Traditional)
9. "God’s Penny"
10. "Everybody’s Goin’ For The Money" (Koerner)
11. "Creepy John" (Koerner)
12. "Good Time Charlie" (Koerner)
13. "Rattlesnake"
14. "Delia’s Gone" (Traditional)
15. "Acres Of Clams" (Traditional)
16. "Last Lonesome Blues"
17. "Nightbird Eyes"

== Personnel ==
- "Spider" John Koerner – guitar, harmonica, vocals
- Chip Taylor Smith – fiddle, bones, background vocals, piano
- Jonny Bridgwood – double bass on "Running, Jumping, Standing Still", "What's the Matter With the Mill" and "Creepy John"
- Ian Anderson – liner notes
- Dave Peabody – liner notes
