= Harry McClintock =

American singer-songwriter (1884–1957)

Harry Kirby McClintock
- Born: Harry Kirby McClintock; October 8, 1884; Uhrichsville, Ohio
- Died: April 24, 1957 (aged 72); San Francisco, California
- Other names: Haywire Mac, Radio Mac, Strawlegs Martin
- Occupations: boomer, author, poet, busker, cowboy, union organizer
- Known for: "The Big Rock Candy Mountains", "Hallelujah, I'm a Bum"

Harry Kirby McClintock (October 8, 1884 – April 24, 1957), also known as "Haywire Mac", was an American railroad man, radio personality, actor, singer, songwriter, and poet, best known for his song "The Big Rock Candy Mountains".

== Life ==
McClintock was born on October 8, 1884, in Uhrichsville, Ohio. Both his parents were from nearby Tippecanoe, Ohio; however, his family moved to Knoxville, Tennessee soon after his birth. In his youth, McClintock ran away from home to join the circus and drifted from place to place throughout his life. He railroaded in Africa, worked as a seaman, supplied food and ammunition to American soldiers while working as a civilian mule train packer in the Philippines, and in 1899 worked as an aide to newsmen in China covering the Boxer Rebellion.

In America, Mac traveled as a railroader and minstrel. He worked for numerous railroads during his life.

On October 8, 1917, McClintock married Bessie K. Johnson in Farmington, Utah. They had one daughter.

== Radio and music ==
In 1925, McClintock participated in a KFRC Radio talent contest. His performance of his song "The Big Rock Candy Mountains" won him spots on two new KFRC radio shows: a children's program titled Mac and His Gang where he sang popular cowboy songs with his "Haywire Orchestry", (Note: This record's album cover (1972 - Folkways Records, FD 5272) is a 1929 photograph of "Mac's Haywire Orchestry". Names from left to right: Cecil "Rowdy" Wright (guitar), Waite "Chief" Woodall (fiddle), Frank Gilmore (accordion), Cleo "Doc" Shahan (guitar), "Duck" Buckholtz (drums), Asa "Ace" Wright (fiddle), Jerry Richard (banjo), Frank Baker (piano), Bessie McClintock (vocals) and "Haywire Mac" McClintock (banjo, guitar and vocals).) and a variety program titled Blue Monday Jamboree, which he hosted with Meredith Willson, Bea Benaderet, Edna Fischer, and future I Love Lucy producer Jess Oppenheimer. McClintock was also a member of Al Pearce's The Happy Go Lucky Hour, a KFRC spin-off of Blue Monday Jamboree, alongside Edna Fischer and Tommy Harris.

"The Big Rock Candy Mountain" reached No. 1 on Billboard's "Hillbilly Hits" chart in 1939. The song was featured in the 2000 Coen brothers' film O Brother, Where Art Thou? McClintock's song "The Old Chisholm Trail" was featured in the end credits of "The Grandest Enterprise Under God" (episode 5) of the TV documentary miniseries The West. He was included in Robert Crumb's series of "Heroes of Blues, Jazz and Country" trading cards.

== Politics ==
McClintock was active in the Industrial Workers of the World (IWW). He served with Frank Little in the Fresno Free Speech Fight from January 12 to March 4, 1911, and participated in the Tucker strike in Utah on June 14, 1913, with Joe Hill. McClintock wrote the marching song of the IWW, "Hallelujah, I'm a Bum", and he is credited with being the first person to sing Hill's song "The Preacher and the Slave" in public. In the early 1920s, McClintock worked and organized union men in the oil fields of West Texas, where he met and recruited author Jim Thompson, who later incorporated him into several short stories using the name Strawlegs Martin.

== Memberships ==
- Initiated by W.F. Little into IWW Union No. 66 on March 4, 1911
- Deputy sheriff, San Francisco, California, deputized on February 7, 1930
- Screen Actors Guild, inducted as a member on May 5, 1939
- American Society of Composers, Authors and Publishers (ASCAP), inducted as a member on September 30, 1940

== Selected discography ==
=== 78s ===
Title	Recording Date	Label / Catalog Number	Note
Ain't We Crazy?	1928-09-06	Victor V-40101	
The Big Rock Candy Mountains	1928-09-06	Victor Talking Machine Co. 21704-B	
Hallelujah! I'm a Bum	1928-03-31	Victor 21343-B (42137)	Reverse side is "The Bum Song".
Get Along, Little Dogies	1928-03-01	Victor V-40016	
Fireman, Save My Child	1929-12-15	Victor V-40234	
The Texas Ranger	1928-03-01	Victor 21487	
Jerry, Go Oil That Car	1928-03-16	Victor 21521	
The Bum Song	1928-03-16	Victor 21343	
The Trail to Mexico	1928-03-09	Victor V-40016	
The Old Chisholm Trail	1928-03-22	Victor 21421	
Circus Days	1928-03-31	Victor 21567	
Goodbye, Old Paint	1928-03-01	Victor 21761	
The Bum Song #2	1928-09-06	Victor 21704	
The Trusty Lariat	1929-12-15	Victor V-40234	
My Last Dollar	1928-03-22	Victor 23690	
Billy Venero	1928-03-31	Victor 21487	
Red River Valley	1928-03-27	Vi 21421-B	
Roamin	1929-12-15	Vi V-40264	
Sam Bass	1928-03-01	Vi 22420	
Hobo's Spring Song	1929-04-30	Vi 22003-A V-40112	
Jesse James	1928-03-09	Vi 21420 LPV548	
If I Had My Druthers	1929-04-30	Vi 22003-B V-40112	
Dad's Dinner Pail	1928-03-09	Vi 21521	

=== LPs ===
Title	Year	Label / Catalog Number
Haywire Mac	1950	Cook Records 01124
Harry K. McClintock "Haywire Mac"	1972	Folkways Records FD 5272
Hallelujah! I'm a Bum	1981	Rounder Records 1009

=== Compilations ===
Title	Year	Label / Catalog Number	Track
Songs to Grow On, Vol. 3: American Work Songs	1951	Folkways Records 07027	Track 4: "Jerry, Go Oil That Car"
Cowboy Songs on Folkways	1991	Smithsonian Folkways 40043	Track 7: "Utah Carl"
Folk Song America, Vol. 1	1991	Smithsonian Collection 461	Track 5: "Big Rock Candy Mountain"
Railroad Songs of the Early 1900s	1998	Rounder Select 1143	Track 20: "Jerry, Go Oil That Car"
O Brother, Where Art Thou?	2000	Lost Highway Records 170069	Track 2: "Big Rock Candy Mountain [sic]"
Back in the Saddle Again: American Cowboy Songs	2004	New World Records	Track 1: "Old Chisholm Trail"

== Bibliography ==
=== Stories ===
- "Railroaders are Tough" (Railroad Magazine, April, 1943)
- "Boomer and Their Women" (Railroad Magazine, December, 1957)

=== Articles ===
- "New Publications – Railroad Songs of Yesteryear" (Railroad Magazine, August 1943) Short biography is part of review.
