= Good Old Koerner, Ray & Glover =

1972 album by Koerner, Ray & Glover

Live album by Koerner, Ray & Glover
- Released: January 1972
- Recorded: 1963 and 1964 at St. Olaf College, Northfield, Minnesota
- Genre: Blues
- Label: Mill City MCR-172

Koerner, Ray & Glover chronology
The Return of Koerner, Ray & Glover (1965)	Good Old Koerner, Ray & Glover (1972)	One Foot in the Groove (1996)

Professional ratings
Review scores
Source	Rating
Allmusic	3/5 stars
MusicHound Blues	2.5/5 stars
The Encyclopedia of Popular Music	3/4 stars

Good Old Koerner, Ray & Glover is an album by Koerner, Ray & Glover, released in 1972.

== History ==
Good Old Koerner, Ray & Glover is a collection of live recordings from the trio's performances at the St. Olaf College folk festivals in 1963 and 1964. It was 24 years before their next release. The album is out of print.

== Reception ==
Steve Knopper, in MusicHound Blues: The Essential Album Guide, called the album a good one for listeners to explore after hearing the group's debut record Blues, Rags and Hollers, calling it "a nice comeback record, although the trio’s time had clearly come and gone."

== Track listing ==
=== Side one ===
1. "Black Jack Davy" (traditional, Carter Family)
2. "Down to Louisiana" (Muddy Waters, Lightnin' Hopkins)
3. "Too Bad" (John Koerner)
4. "Dust My Broom" (Robert Johnson)
5. "Black Snake Moan" (Lead Belly)
6. "Mumblin' Word" (traditional, Lead Belly)
7. "Two Trains" (Waters)

=== Side two ===
1. "Drunken Instrumental" (Tony Glover, Dave Ray)
2. "Love to You" (Willie Dixon, Waters)
3. "Special Agent" (Sleepy John Estes)
4. "Mean Ol' Southern" (Arthur Crudup)
5. "Love Bug" (Koerner)
6. "Linin' Track" (traditional, Lead Belly)

== Personnel ==
- Tony "Little Sun" Glover – harmonica, vocals
- "Spider" John Koerner – guitar, vocals
- Dave "Snaker" Ray – guitar, vocals
