= Running, Jumping, Standing Still =

1969 album by Spider John Koerner and Willie Murphy

Studio album by "Spider" John Koerner, Willie Murphy
- Released: December 1969
- Genre: Blues, folk
- Length: 48:37
- Label: Elektra EKS-74041
- Producer: Frazier Mohawk

"Spider" John Koerner, Willie Murphy chronology
Spider Blues (1965)	Running, Jumping, Standing Still (1969)	Music is Just a Bunch of Notes (1972)

Running, Jumping, Standing Still is an album by blues artists "Spider" John Koerner and Willie Murphy, released in 1969. The album is often credited in Koerner's solo discography.

== History ==
Koerner and Murphy performed folk and blues as a duo for five years. Although offered the opportunity by Elektra to record a second album, Koerner declined in order to pursue a film career. Murphy declined an offer to become a producer for Elektra. In a 2010 interview, Murphy recalled, "After we made the record, we had to have a van and a bunch of stuff, and a bass player and drummer. That’s what disenchanted Koerner. Elektra wanted us to do a second album, but he didn’t want to do it. I was OK with that, because I had it in my mind to come back [to Minneapolis] and put together a big band.”

Koerner and Murphy released a single, "Magazine Lady" b/w "Friends and Lovers" the same year.

"I Ain't Blue" was covered by Bonnie Raitt on her debut album.

Originally released on the Elektra label, Running, Jumping, Standing Still was reissued by Red House in 1994.

== Reception ==
Professional ratings
Review scores
Source	Rating
Allmusic	4.5/5 stars
Crawdaddy!	(no rating)
Rolling Stone	(positive)
The Encyclopedia of Popular Music	3/4 stars

In his Allmusic review, music critic Steve Cooper praised the album and wrote, "An oddly effective, one-off marriage of folk-blues and ragtime piano that kicks. 'Magazine Lady,' a wildly in-the-groove tale of photo lust, is not to be missed."

Crawdaddy! gave the album a very positive review: "Running Jumping Standing Still is one of the most unique and underrated albums of the folk boom, perhaps the only psychedelic ragtime blues album ever made. It brims over with boisterous energy and stellar playing, driven by John Koerner’s distinctive guitar work and Willie Murphy’s dynamic piano."

== Track listing ==
All songs by John Koerner and Willie Murphy.

1. "Red Palace" – 5:31
2. "I Ain't Blue" – 3:45
3. "Bill & Annie" – 4:27
4. "Old Brown Dog" – 8:10
5. "Running, Jumping, Standing Still" – 5:40
6. "Sidestep" – 4:11
7. "Magazine Lady" – 2:40
8. "Friends and Lovers" – 3:05
9. "Sometimes I Can't Help Myself" – 3:35
10. "Good Night" – 4:10
11. "Some Sweet Nancy" – 3:23

== Personnel ==
- "Spider" John Koerner – guitar, vocals
- Willie Murphy – bass, piano, vocals
- Sanford Konikoff – drums
- Todd Anderson – horn
- Ken Jenkins – trombone, tenor sax, cello, acoustic bass
- John Wilce — banjo, mandolin
