= Music Is Just a Bunch of Notes =

1972 album by Spider John Koerner and Willie & the Bumblebees

Studio album by "Spider" John Koerner, Willie and the Bumblebees
- Released: May 1972
- Recorded: March 15–May 6, 1972, a room above the Coffeehouse Extempore, Minneapolis, MN
- Genre: Blues
- Label: Sweetjane
- Producer: Dave Ray, Sylvia Ray

"Spider" John Koerner, Willie and the Bumblebees chronology
| Running, Jumping, Standing Still (1969) | Music Is Just a Bunch of Notes (1972) | Some American Folk Songs Like They Used To (1974) |

Professional ratings
Review scores
| Source | Rating |
|---|---|
| The Encyclopedia of Popular Music | 3/4 stars |

Music Is Just a Bunch of Notes is an album by blues artists "Spider" John Koerner and Willie and the Bumblebees, released in 1972.

"Macalester Don't Stop Now 10-Mar-72" was recorded live by Koerner, Dave Ray, and Bonnie Raitt at Macalester College in St. Paul, Minnesota on March 10, 1972. "Waiting for Go with Normal Dub" was recorded live in Minneapolis, Minnesota outside of Tom Olson's house.

The album had a plain white cover that was rubber stamped by hand, making each one unique. This included one that said "also on side two: Everybody's Going For the Money", which had been left off of the label. Early copies had a serial number alá the Beatles' White Album. Later copies came in a plain white cover with a central cut-out so the record label could be read; a large label was glued to the top reading "Spider John Koerner, Tom Olson and/Willie Murphy with The Bumblebees SJL5872."

== Re-release ==
Mark Trehus, owner of the Minneapolis record store Treehouse Records and a longtime fan of Koerner, re-released Music Is Just a Bunch of Notes in 2010 on his label Nero's Neptune Records, along with March 1963, an album of unreleased live songs and a radio interview originally recorded as a studio session for Blues, Rags and Hollers. The CD included a video of Koerner's experimental film The Secret of Sleep.

== Track listing ==
=== Side one ===
1. "Macalester Don't Stop Now 10-Mar-72" – :23
2. "Ramble, Tumble" (John Koerner) – 3:19
3. "Don't Terrify Me" (Koerner) – 3:04
4. "Be Careful" (Koerner) – 4:53
5. "Waiting for Go with Normal Dub" (Tom Olson) – 5:30

=== Side two ===
1. "Cindy's #" (Palmer)
2. "Everybody's Goin' For The Money" (Koerner)
3. "Skipper And His Wife" (Koerner)
4. "Thief River Falls" (Koerner, Willie Murphy)
5. "Mr. Image" (Olson)
6. "Taking Time" (Koerner)
7. "The Wall" (Olson)

== Personnel ==
- John Koerner – guitar, vocals
- Willie Murphy – bass, piano, vocals
- Dave Ray – vocals on "The Wall"
- Tom Olson – vocals ("Waiting for Go with Normal Dub", "Mr. Image", "The Wall")
- John Beach – piano
- Stephen Bradley – drums
- Gene Hoffman – tenor saxophone
- Maurice Jaycox – alto and baritone saxophone
- Voyle Harris – trumpet
- Mary Du Shane – violin
- Sandy Herforth – violin
- Alan Weisman – harp ("Thief River Falls")
- Dave Morton – vocals
- Betty Brenner – vocals
- Liz Thorson – vocals
- Bibi Bathos – vocals
- Stevi Beck – vocals
