= StarGeezer =

1996 album by Spider John Koerner

Studio album by "Spider" John Koerner
- Released: March 21, 1996
- Recorded: November 1995 at The Boiler Room, New Orleans, LA
- Genre: Folk
- Length: 51:21
- Label: Red House RHR 84
- Producer: Willie Murphy

"Spider" John Koerner chronology
Raised by Humans (1992)	StarGeezer (1996)	Live @ The 400 Bar (2009)

StarGeezer is an album by folk artist "Spider" John Koerner, released in 1996. Some of the songs are re-recordings of titles previously released by Koerner on albums that are no longer in print.

The album was recorded in New Orleans. Guest musicians included Reggie Houston, Amasa Miller, and Johnny Vidacovich.

== Reception ==
Professional ratings
Review scores
Source	Rating
Allmusic	3/5 stars
Entertainment Weekly	(B)
The Encyclopedia of Popular Music	3/4 stars

In his Allmusic review, critic Thom Owens wrote, "There aren't any standout songs, but the entire album has a relaxed, welcoming vibe that makes it quite a pleasant listen." Tom Sinclair of Entertainment Weekly called StarGeezer "a rootsy album of traditional folk and wry originals," and added that Koerner "shows that four decades of obscurity haven't diminished his talent for making engaging music out of wholly familiar elements."

== Track listing ==
All songs traditional unless otherwise noted.

1. "Intro" (traditional) – 0:40
2. "Jack of Diamonds" – 2:28
3. "Going Down Together" (John Koerner, Willie Murphy) – 3:17
4. "Rattlesnake" – 1:37
5. "Danville Girl" – 3:30
6. "Last Lonesome Blues" (Koerner) – 4:19
7. "Stewball" – 4:18
8. "The Skipper and His Wife" – 3:29
9. "Casey Jones" – 3:11
10. "When First unto This Country" – 2:09
11. "Thief River Falls" (Koerner, Murphy) – 2:54
12. "Phoebe" – 3:13
13. "The Days of Forty-Nine" – 3:06
14. "The Golden Vanity" – 3:22
15. "Some People Say" – 4:07
16. "Taking My Time" – 5:41
17. "Stardust" (Hoagy Carmichael) – 4:19

== Personnel ==
- "Spider" John Koerner – guitar, harmonica, vocals
- Willie Murphy – piano, percussion, bass, vocals
- Johnny Vidacovich – drums
- Jan Cornish – percussion
- Bill Hinkley – vocals
- Reggie Houston – sax, percussion, shaker
- Judy Larson – vocals
- Eric Peltoniemi – vocals

Production notes

- Willie Murphy – producer, mixing
- Bob Feldman – executive producer
- Ron Black - engineer
- Mark Bingham - 2nd engineer
- Chris Frymire – editing, pre-mastering
- David Glasser – mastering
- Tom Mudge – mixing
- Eric Peltoniemi – coordination, mixing
- Dan Corrigan – photography
- Linda Beauvais – artwork, design
