= Hallelujah, I'm a Bum =

American folk song

"Hallelujah, I'm a Bum" (Roud 7992) is an American folk song that responds with humorous sarcasm to unhelpful moralizing about the circumstance of being a hobo. The song's authorship is uncertain, but according to hobo poetry researcher Bud L. McKillips, the words were written by an IWW member. Carl Sandburg collected the song for his anthology The American Songbag, and he wrote that it was "heard at the water tanks of railroads in Kansas in 1897 and from harvest hands who worked in the wheat fields of Pawnee County, was picked up later by the I.W.W.s, who made verses of their own for it, and gave it a wide fame." Some verses may have been written by a Kansas City hobo known only as "One-Finger Ellis," who scribbled it on the wall of his prison cell in 1897. There is also a questionable theory that Harry McClintock, an IWW member, could have written it in 1899 when he was only fifteen. However, Harry McClintock has stated that he wrote the song in 1902.

== Song ==
A parody of the Presbyterian hymn "Revive Us Again" by William Paton Mackay, the song was printed by the Industrial Workers of the World in 1908, and adopted by its Spokane, Washington branch as their anthem later that year. The success of their free speech fights of 1909 led to its widespread popularity.

One version published in 1908 goes:

Why don't you work like other folks do?
How the hell can I work when there's no work to do?

Refrain
Hallelujah, I'm a bum,
Hallelujah, bum again,
Hallelujah, give us a handout
To revive us again.

Oh, why don't you save all the money you earn?
If I didn't eat, I'd have money to burn.

Whenever I get all the money I earn,
The boss will be broke, and to work he must turn.

Oh, I like my boss, he's a good friend of mine,
That's why I am starving out on the bread line.

When springtime it comes, oh, won't we have fun;
We'll throw off our jobs, and go on the bum.

== Other versions ==
The New Christy Minstrels created another version which added more story to the original. This version goes:

I went to a house and I knocked on the door;
The lady comes out and says, "You've been here before"
She gives a loud whistle and I run for my life!
Well, wouldn't you know, it's the constable's wife.

Refrain:
Hallelujah, I'm a bum,
Hallelujah, bum again,
Hallelujah, gimme a handout
And you'll be my friend

"Now, why don't you settle down and get yourself a wife?"
"I'd rather be a BUM for the rest of me life!"
"If you got a job, then you'd be my honey"
"I wouldn't marry you if I had lots o' money!"

Refrain
"And shing for my thupper when I'm down and out"

In 1961, the Freedom Riders adapted the song, with these lyrics:

Hallelujah, I'm a-travelin',
Hallelujah, ain't it fine?
Hallelujah, I'm a-travelin',
Down freedom's main line.

== Recordings ==
- Harry McClintock 1928
- Vernon Dalhart 1928
- Jack Kaufman 1928
- Frank Luther 1928
- Hobo Jack Turner 1928
- Pete Wiggins 1928
- Ted Fiorito 1932
- George Olsen 1933
- Dan Ritchie 1933
- Fats Waller 1939 Fine Arabian Stuff
- Utah Phillips Legends of Folk, We Have Fed You All
- Pete Seeger 1962 on American Favorite Ballads
- Barbara Dane 1970 FTA! Songs of the GI Resistance
- The New Christy Minstrels
- Pousette-Dart Band 1979 Never Enough
- "Spider" John Koerner Some American Folk Songs Like They Used To
- Tony Gilkyson 1998 Sparko
- Dan Zanes 2004 Parades and Panoramas: 25 Songs Collected by Carl Sandburg for the American Songbag
- Daniel, Fred & Julie 2009
- Janne Westerlund 2012
- Michael Penn and Aimee Mann 2025

== Published versions ==
- 1908 song card, Spokane IWW
- American Songbag 1927 Carl Sandburg pp. 184–185
- Harry McClintock, "Hallelujah I'm A Bum," Copyright 8/13/1928, E695974.
- George Milburn, The Hobo's Hornbook, 1930
- Margaret Bradford Boni, Fireside Book of Folk Songs, 1947
- Edith Fowke and Joe Glazer, eds., Songs of Work and Protest 1973 p. 127
- Little Red Songbook Centenary Edition, 2005
- Rise Up Singing p. 181

== In popular culture ==
Historian Mark Sullivan in his book Our Times cites the song as experiencing a sudden and unexpected revival in 1928.

A 1933 musical comedy film is titled Hallelujah, I'm a Bum. It stars Al Jolson, who featured a song of the same title, but entirely different tune. Only the lyrics "Hallelujah, I'm a bum" are reused. In the UK, where the word "bum" is crude slang for the human posterior, the soundtrack was edited so that "bum" was replaced with a short whistle.

The music was quoted in the Charlie Chaplin movie Modern Times (1936), when Charlie is released from the home for the bewildered and trudges along the street before picking up a red flag that has dropped off the back of a truck. To get the attention of the truck driver, Charlie starts waving the flag around, which causes a crowd of radical trade unionists to start marching behind him, believing that a revolution has begun. The sequence ends when Charlie, who has no idea the union members are following him, is arrested as a Communist agitator. The song is used several times thereafter throughout the film, such as when he is jailed and when a factory he is employed at goes on strike.

The song is requested of Larry "Lonesome" Rhodes by a co-prisoner in an early scene of the Elia Kazan movie A Face in the Crowd (1957).

The Porky Pig cartoon Confusions of a Nutzy Spy depicts a spy attempting to plant a bomb on which "Hallelujah, I'm a Bomb!" is written.

It was used in an episode of television series Checkmate where Doug McClure investigates a hobo camp.

In 2012, the rock band, Local H, released their seventh studio album, Hallelujah! I'm a Bum.

The 1928 recording of the song was featured in Bob Dylan's Thanksgiving "leftovers"-themed episode of his Theme Time Radio Hour program.

The song was featured in Season 3 Episode 2 of HBO's The Leftovers.

The song is referenced in "Beer for Breakfast" by The Replacements, on their 1997 album All for Nothing / Nothing for All.

The song is adapted, with same tune and some words revised, as "Hallelujah I'm a Cat" by Garrison Keilor and Frederica von Stade in the CD "Songs of the Cat".

The song is repeatedly sung by the janitor Howard in the 2004 film One Point O.
