= Lots More Blues, Rags and Hollers =

1964 album by Koerner, Ray & Glover

Studio album by Koerner, Ray & Glover
- Released: June 19, 1964
- Recorded: September 1963 – April 1964 (New York City, New York, U.S.)
- Genre: Blues
- Length: 47:40; 64:43 (reissue)
- Labels: Elektra EKL-267 (mono), EKS-7267 (stereo)
- Producers: Paul Rothchild, Jac Holzman

Koerner, Ray & Glover chronology
Blues, Rags and Hollers (1963)	Lots More Blues, Rags and Hollers (1964)	The Return of Koerner, Ray & Glover (1965)

Lots More Blues, Rags and Hollers is the second studio album by blues trio Koerner, Ray & Glover. The album was released on June 19, 1964.

== History ==
Between this release and their next, Dave Ray and John Koerner each recorded a solo album, Snaker's Here and Spider Blues, respectively. The trio also appeared at the 1964 Newport Folk Festival, where their performance was recorded for the Vanguard Records album Newport Folk Festival 1964: Evening Concerts Vol. 3. The songs performed by the trio included "Blackjack Davy" and "What's the Matter with the Mill".

Lots More Blues, Rags and Hollers was reissued by Red House Records in 1999 with five bonus tracks from the original sessions. It was also reissued by WEA International along with Blues, Rags and Hollers in 2004.

== Reception ==
Professional ratings
Review scores
Source	Rating
Allmusic	4/5 stars
No Depression	(no rating)
The Penguin Guide to Blues Recordings	2.5/4 stars
MusicHound Blues	3.5/5 stars
The Encyclopedia of Popular Music	3/4 stars

In his review of the 1999 reissue of their second album, No Depression critic Joel Roberts stated Koerner, Ray and Glover "emerged as one of the best and most popular groups on the burgeoning ’60s blues-folk revival scene" and said their original tunes "stand up next to the classics."

Calling them "the best white blues group", Allmusic critic Jeff Burger wrote, "Koerner and Ray were first-rate guitarists, Glover could play harmonica like nobody's business and they all sang with style, enthusiasm, and a dash of humor. Plus, they had great material, some from blues giants like Lead Belly and Memphis Minnie, but much of it original."

== Track listing ==
1. "Black Dog" (traditional) – 2:11
2. "Whomp Bom" (John Koerner) – 3:04
3. "Black Betty" (Lead Belly) – 0:59
4. "Honey Bee" (McKinley Morganfield) – 4:59
5. "Crazy Fool" (Koerner) – 3:40
6. "Keep Your Hands Off Her" (Lead Belly, Gil Turner) – 1:57
7. "Duncan and Brady" (traditional, adapted with new lyrics by Koerner) – 4:30
8. "Fine Soft Land" (Dave Ray) – 3:50
9. "Red Cross Store" (Lead Belly, John Lomax, Alan Lomax) – 1:58
10. "Lady Day" (Koerner) – 3:46
11. "Freeeze to Me, Mama" (Ray) – 2:21
12. "Ted Mack Rag" (Koerner) – 1:33
13. "Fannin Street" (Lead Belly) – 5:04
14. "Love Bug" (Koerner) – 2:20
15. "Can't Get My Rest at Night" (Ray) – 3:21
16. "What's the Matter with the Mill?" (Memphis Minnie) – 2:07

=== 1999 reissue bonus tracks ===
1. "Fixin' to Die" (Bukka White adapted with new lyrics by Ray) – 3:47
2. "My Little Woman" (Koerner) – 2:10
3. "Leavin' Here Blues" (Ray) – 4:48
4. "Southbound Train" (Koerner) – 4:04
5. "Slappin' on My Black Cat Bone" (Ray) – 2:14

== Personnel ==
- Tony "Little Sun" Glover – harmonica, vocals, liner notes, arranger
- "Spider" John Koerner – guitar, harmonica, arranger, vocals
- Dave "Snaker" Ray – guitar, arranger, vocals

Production notes

- Paul Rothchild – producer
- Jac Holzman – producer, production supervisor
- Chris Frymire – remixing, mastering
- Tony Glover – remixing, mastering
- William S. Harvey – cover design
- Dave Ray – remixing, mastering
- Eric Peltoniemi – design, reissue production supervisor
- Paul Nelson – liner notes, assistant producer
