= The Cedar Cultural Center =

Neighborhood of Minneapolis, Minnesota

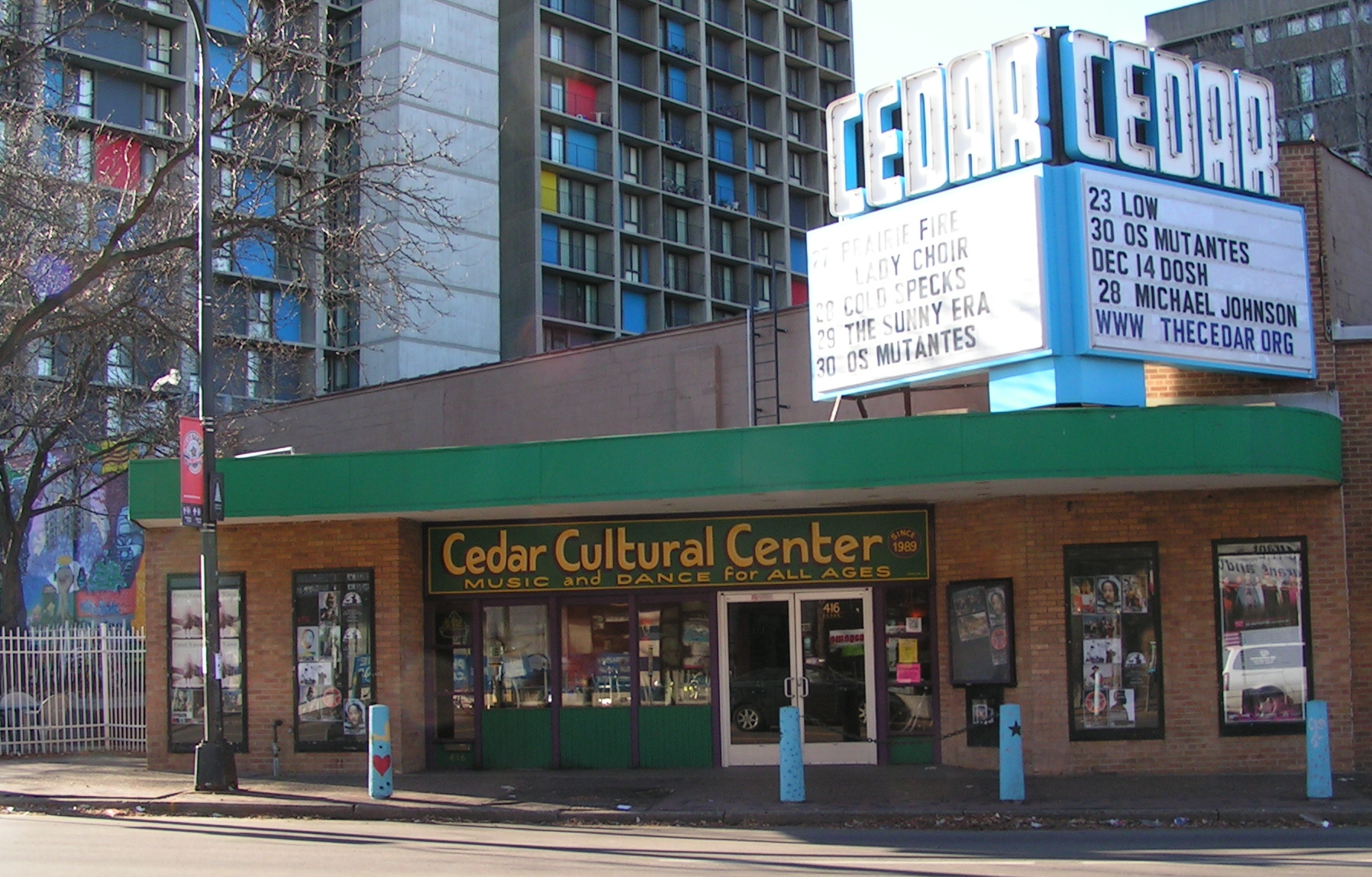
- The Cedar
- Interactive map of The Cedar Cultural Center
- Address: 416 Cedar Ave S
- Location: Cedar-Riverside; Minneapolis, Minnesota; United States
- Coordinates: 44.9694°N 93.2475°W
- Capacity: 450 (seated); 625 (standing)
- Type: Music venue

Construction
- Built: 1948; 78 years ago
- Opened: 1989; 37 years ago

Website
- www.thecedar.org

The Cedar Cultural Center ("The Cedar") is a music venue in Cedar-Riverside neighborhood of Minneapolis, Minnesota, United States, near the West Bank campus of the University of Minnesota. It is a 503(c) non-profit organization and operated by volunteers.

== History ==
The building which houses the Cedar Cultural Center was a movie theater called the Cedar Theater from 1948 until the 1970s. In 1989 the building was donated to the non-profit organization Minnesota STAR (Society for Traditional Arts and Resources) started by Deb Martin and Mary Ann Dotson.

A guitar belonging to Minneapolis folk musician Spider John Koerner is on display in a glass case in the Cedar's lobby. Koerner had originally donated the 12-string Epiphone to the nearby Palmer's Bar upon his retirement in 2013, but when Palmer's closed in 2025, the guitar was gifted to the Cedar.

== Events ==
The Cedar is the host to a wide variety of musical genres with an emphasis on world music and lesser known or independent artists. Since 2009, the Cedar has hosted an annual Global Roots Festival showcasing international musicians.

== See also ==
- West Bank campus of University of Minnesota
- Not-for-profit arts organization
