= Live @ The 400 Bar =

2009 album by Spider John Koerner and Tony Glover

Live album by John Koerner, Tony Glover
- Released: 2009
- Recorded: January 2006, The 400 Bar, Minneapolis, MN
- Genre: Folk, blues
- Label: CC Entertainment

John Koerner chronology
| StarGeezer (1996) | Live @ The 400 Bar (2009) | March 1963 (2010) |

Live @ The 400 Bar is an album by folk and blues artists John Koerner and Tony Glover, released in 2009.

== History ==
The 400 Bar, in the West Bank district of Minneapolis, Minnesota, was one of the venues where both John Koerner and Tony Glover played in their early days as part of Koerner, Ray & Glover. In an interview with the Minneapolis newspaper the Star Tribune, Glover said, "We started at the Triangle Bar, and John (Koerner) would go across the street to the Viking Bar during our breaks, so we eventually started playing at the Viking. The same thing happened between the Viking and the 400 Bar. We sort of kept moving to the places John liked to go to enjoy a quiet beer." Live at The 400 Bar was recorded over two performances in January 2009.

== Reception ==
Professional ratings
Review scores
| Source | Rating |
|---|---|
| The A.V. Club | (B) |

The A.V. Club gave the release a positive review, writing "...it’s just live enough to keep the shine on the stage. If the Twin Cities is indeed enjoying a new acoustic boom, it’s high time we heard again from the groundbreaking—and still premier—practitioners. That damn "Mill" is still broke down, but Koerner and Glover are workin’ just fine."

== Track listing ==
All songs are traditional unless otherwise noted.

1. "Introduction"
2. "Careless Love"
3. "Stewball"
4. "Sail Away Ladies"
5. "Dodger"
6. "Walking Blues"
7. "Ezekiel Saw the Wheel"
8. "Red Apple Juice"
9. "St. James Infirmary" (Joe Primrose, Traditional)
10. "Black Dog"
11. "Some People Say"
12. "The Cuckoo"
13. "What's the Matter with the Mill" (Memphis Minnie)
14. "Goodnight Irene" (Lead Belly, Alan Lomax)

== Personnel ==
- "Spider" John Koerner – guitar, vocals
- Tony Glover – harmonica
- Chad Weis – engineer
