= Cornbread Harris =

American musician (born 1927)

- Harris in 2026
- Born: James Samuel Harris Jr. April 23, 1927 (age 99); Chicago, Illinois, U.S.
- Occupation: Musician
- Years active: 1955-present
- Children: James Harris III
- Parent(s): James Samuel Harris Sr. Alberta Jones Nelson

James Samuel "Cornbread" Harris Jr. (born James Samuel Harris Jr.; April 23, 1927) is an American musician. He is a singer and pianist who performs in Minneapolis, Minnesota. He was a performer on Minnesota's first rock 'n' roll record, and is the father of record producer Jimmy Jam.

== Family and early years ==
Harris was born James Samuel Harris Jr. on April 23, 1927 in Chicago, the son of James Samuel Harris Sr. (1893–1930), a gambler, and his wife, Alberta Jones Nelson (1895–1930). When his father was shot while gambling and his mother died shortly after, he was orphaned at the age of three. He lived with foster families until he was 11 or 12, when he and his sister went to live with his grandparents in Saint Paul, Minnesota. He has been married four times and is currently married to Sabreen. One of his daughters died and his daughter Jennifer Harris resides in Minneapolis, MN and has her BS Degree. He is also, the father of Jimmy Jam (James Harris III) who produced records for Janet Jackson, Mariah Carey and Usher.

Country music was an early influence, and Hank Williams and Gene Autry were among his early favorites.

== Later career ==
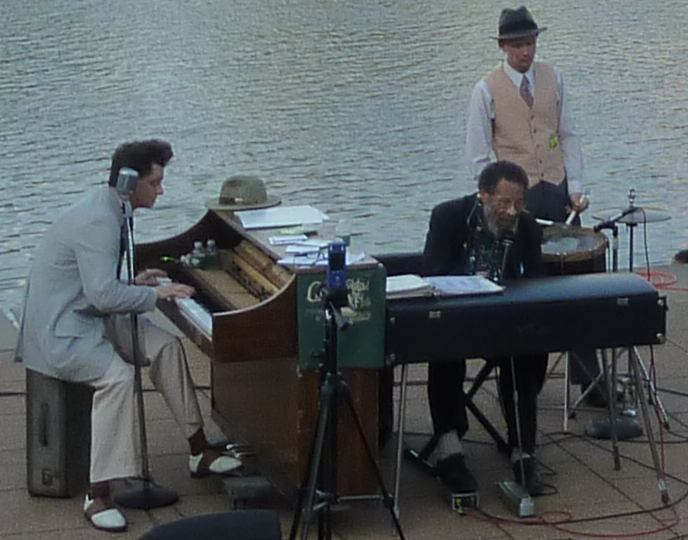
Cornbread Harris (center) sings "Deeper Blues" at Minneapolis downtown's National Night Out 2010 with Cadillac Kolstad and Johann Swenson

Harris co-wrote Augie Garcia's "Hi Yo Silver," a 1955 song that was Minnesota's first rock 'n' roll recording. He performed on the record, which he called a one-hit wonder (although Garcia is remembered as the godfather of Minnesota rock 'n' roll because of Augie's antics on stage upstaging Elvis Presley.).

Harris was in the U.S. military and later worked for about 25 years for American Hoist & Derrick.

His repertoire includes blues and jazz. Harris still plays Minneapolis nightclubs. Playing at venues including the Loring Pasta Bar in Dinkytown, Clubhouse Jäger in the North Loop and Palmer's Bar and the Nomad World Pub on the West Bank until their closures. He celebrated his 99th birthday with a performance at Hook and Ladder on Lake St. on April 23, 2026

Harris is a mentor to Cadillac Kolstad and City Pages calls them the "must-see dueling-piano act in town".

== Awards ==
- The "Blues Legend Award" (2012)
- The Sally Awards (2013)
