= Dakota Dave Hull =

American guitarist (born 1950)

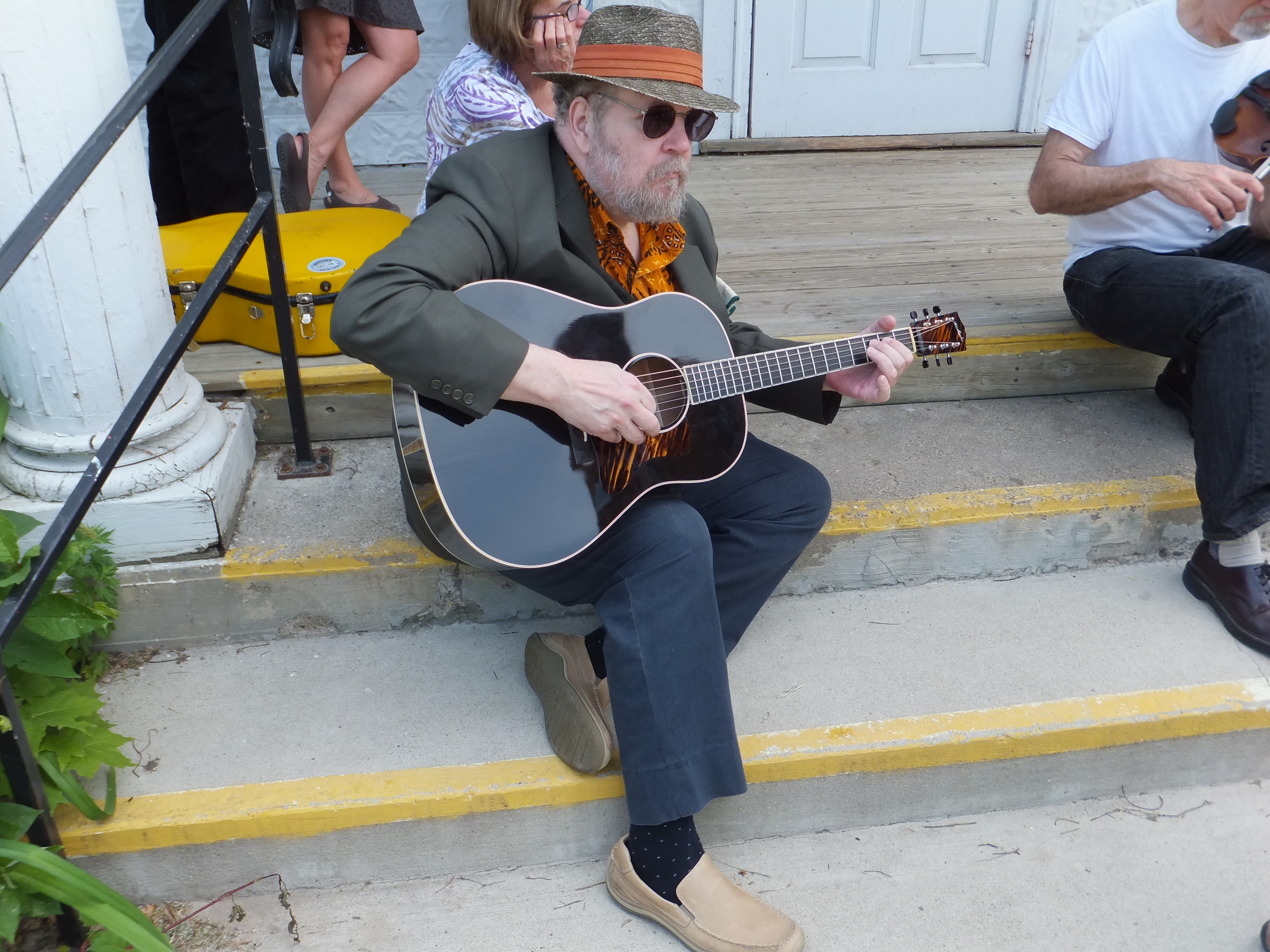

Background information
- Born: David Hull; April 19, 1950 (age 75); Fargo, North Dakota, U.S.
- Genres: blues, ragtime, folk
- Occupation: Musician
- Instrument: Guitar
- Years active: 1969–present
- Labels: Flying Fish
- Website: www.dakotadavehull.com

"Dakota" Dave Hull (born April 19, 1950, in Fargo, North Dakota, United States) is an American acoustic fingerstyle guitarist who plays in a variety of styles: blues, gospel, ragtime, and folk music. He is also a recognized music historian and published one book, 2012's Ragtime Guitar in the Classic American Style.

== Musical career ==
Hull was born in Fargo, North Dakota, which led to his nickname "Dakota Dave". He has long been a fixture of the West Bank music scene in Minneapolis, Minnesota. He has toured the world playing solo fingerstyle guitar in multiple genres including American folk music, ragtime, gospel, and blues. He hosted the radio show The Dakota Dave Hull Show on KFAI radio in Minneapolis for 20 years and was a frequent performer on A Prairie Home Companion.

Hull has engineered, produced and performed with many artists, include Doc Watson, Dave Van Ronk, Utah Phillips, Robin & Linda Williams, Eric Peltoniemi, "Spider" John Koerner, Duck Baker, Dave "Snaker" Ray, and Peter Ostroushko.

== Critical reception ==
Reviewing Hull's 1991 album Reunion Rag for AllMusic, Richard Foss praised "Hull's astonishing skill as both a guitarist and composer. At times Hull sounds like John Fahey during the latter's sunnier moments, playing bright ragtime pieces and introspective tunes inspired by American traditional and old timey music. ... Many of these pieces deserve to become classics."

== Discography ==
=== Solo ===
- Hull’s Victory (Flying Fish, 1983)
- Reunion Rag (Flying Fish, 1991)
- New Shirt (Arabica, 1994)
- Sheridan Square Rag (Arabica, 2002)
- The Loyalty Waltz (Arabica, 2004)
- Time Machine (Arabica, 2007)
- Under the North Star (Arabica, 2013)
- Heavenly Hope (Arabica 2016)
- This Earthly Life (Arabica, 2016)
- Another Cup (Arabica, 2018)
- The Graveyard Shift (Arabica, 2019)
- Six-Guns & Fountain Pens (Arabica, 2021)
- Better Late Than Never (Arabica, 2023)

=== With others ===
- Ace Pickin’ and Sweet Harmony (Train on the Island Records, 1977) with Sean Blackburn
- North by Southwest (Biscuit City Records, 1978) with Sean Blackburn
- River of Swing (Flying Fish, 1977) with Sean Blackburn
- Double Cappuccino (Arabica, 1998) as Hull & Larson with Kari Larson
- Moonbeams (Arabica, 1999) as Hull & Larson with Kari Larson
- The Goose is Getting Fat (Arabica, 2000) as Hull & Larson with Kari Larson
- Airship (Arabica, 2007) with Pop Wagner
- When You Ask a Girl to Leave Her Happy Home (Arabica, 2011) with Duck Baker
- Sukiyaki (Arabica, 2018) with Takasi Hamada, Xavier Ohmura, and Shohei Toyoda
