= The Return of Koerner, Ray & Glover =

1965 album by Koerner, Ray & Glover

The Return of Koerner, Ray and Glover

Studio album by Koerner, Ray & Glover
- Released: October 22, 1965
- Recorded: August 1965
- Genre: Blues
- Length: 42:55
- Label: Elektra EKL-305 (mono) EKS-7305 (stereo)
- Producer: Paul Rothchild

Koerner, Ray & Glover chronology
Lots More Blues, Rags and Hollers (1964)	The Return of Koerner, Ray and Glover (1965)	Good Old Koerner, Ray & Glover (1972)

The Return of Koerner, Ray and Glover is the third and final studio album by Koerner, Ray & Glover. The album was released on October 22, 1965. It was their last recording for Elektra and it would be seven years before the trio's next release.

Koerner appeared at the 1965 Newport Folk Festival accompanied by Glover, one of the few times the two performed without Dave Ray.

The Return of Koerner, Ray and Glover was reissued by Red House Records in 1999.

== Reception ==
Professional ratings
Review scores
Source	Rating
AllMusic	4/5 stars
The Encyclopedia of Popular Music	3/4 stars
MusicHound Blues	2/5 stars
The Penguin Guide to Blues Recordings	2.5/4 stars

AllMusic critic Jeff Burger wrote that "...this beautifully remasters 1965 collection is filled with the humor, rhythm, soulful vocals and top-notch material that made the outfit such a standout... If you like this kind of music, it's a safe bet that you'll love this album." In his JazzTimes review, music critic Bill Milkowski called the album "a quintessential white boy blues album that helped fuel the '60s blues boom." Reviewed in Mother Jones, the reissue was called "... driving, foot-stomping, aggressively acoustic blues that seamlessly meshes original composition with material from the great bluesmen... an album of remarkable breadth, much more than the sum of its parts."

== Track listing ==
1. "I Want to See My Baby" (John Koerner) – 3:05
2. "Titanic" (Lead Belly) – 4:05
3. "You've Got to Be Careful" (Koerner) – 2:50
4. "Looky Looky Yonder" (Lead Belly, Alan Lomax, John Lomax) – 1:10
5. "Statesboro Blues" (Blind Willie McTell) – 3:05
6. "Eugene C." (Koerner) – 2:25
7. "Goin' to the Country" (Koerner) – 2:40
8. "The Boys Was Shootin' It Out Last Night" (Koerner) – 2:45
9. "Poor Howard" (Lead Belly, Lomax, Lomax) – 2:25
10. "I Don't Want to Be Terrified" (Koerner) – 3:50
11. "Don't Let Your Right Hand Know What Your Left Hand Do" (Tony Glover) – 3:05
12. "Lonesome Road" (traditional) – 2:35
13. "England Blues" (Koerner) – 2:35
14. "Packin' Truck" (Lead Belly, Lomax, Lomax) – 3:55
15. "John Hardy" (traditional) – 2:25

== Personnel ==
- Tony "Little Sun" Glover – harmonica, vocals, liner notes
- "Spider" John Koerner – guitar, vocals
- Dave "Snaker" Ray – guitar, vocals

Production notes

- Paul Rothchild – producer
- Chris Frymire – remixing, mastering
- Eric Peltoniemi – reissue producer, design, layout design
