= Bonnie Raitt (album) =

Studio album by Bonnie Raitt
- Released: November 1971
- Recorded: August 1971
- Studios: Enchanted Island, Lake Minnetonka, Minnesota
- Genres: Blues; rock; folk rock
- Length: 37:39
- Label: Warner Bros.
- Producer: Willie Murphy

Bonnie Raitt chronology
Bonnie Raitt (1971)	Give It Up (1972)

Bonnie Raitt is the debut album by Bonnie Raitt, released in 1971.

== Background ==
The album was recorded at an empty summer camp on Enchanted Island, about 15 miles west of Minneapolis on Lake Minnetonka in August 1971. This location was chosen because of Raitt's close friendship with John Koerner and Dave Ray, two musicians from Minneapolis who were playing on the East Coast folk circuit. Koerner and Ray encouraged Raitt to check out Minneapolis for the location of her first recording. "We recorded live on four tracks because we wanted a more spontaneous and natural feeling in the music", Raitt wrote in the album's liner notes, "a feeling often sacrificed when the musicians know they can overdub their part on a separate track until it's perfect."

== Reception ==
Professional ratings
Review scores
Source	Rating
AllMusic	4/5 stars
Christgau's Record Guide	A−
Entertainment Weekly	A+
The Village Voice	B+

Though album sales were modest, Bonnie Raitt was warmly received by rock critics. "[A]n unusual collection of songs performed by an unusual assortment of musicians", wrote Rolling Stone. "Raitt is a folkie by history but not by aesthetic", wrote Robert Christgau in his Consumer Guide column. "She includes songs from Steve Stills, the Marvelettes, and a classic feminist blues singer named Sippie Wallace because she knows the world doesn't end with acoustic song-poems and Fred McDowell. An adult repertoire that rocks with a steady roll, and she's all of twenty-one years old."

== Track listing ==
Side one

1. "Bluebird" (Stephen Stills) – 3:29
2. "Mighty Tight Woman" (Sippie Wallace) – 4:20
3. "Thank You" (Bonnie Raitt) – 2:50
4. "Finest Lovin' Man" (Raitt) – 4:42
5. "Any Day Woman" (Paul Siebel) – 2:23

Side two

1. "Big Road" (Tommy Johnson) – 3:31
2. "Walking Blues" (Robert Johnson) – 2:40
3. "Danger Heartbreak Dead Ahead" (Ivy Hunter, Clarence Paul, William "Mickey" Stevenson) – 2:53
4. "Since I Fell for You" (Buddy Johnson) – 3:06
5. "I Ain't Blue" (John Koerner, Willie Murphy) – 3:36
6. "Women Be Wise" (Sippie Wallace) – 4:09

== Personnel ==
- Bonnie Raitt – lead vocals, backing vocals (1, 8), acoustic guitar, slide guitar, acoustic piano (3), electric slide guitar (8)
- Willie Murphy – acoustic piano (1, 4, 6, 8, 9), guitar (3), backing vocals (5, 10), percussion (10),
- John Beach – acoustic piano (2, 11), arrangements (2)
- Peter Bell – electric guitar (1), backing vocals (1, 8, 10), acoustic guitar (6), percussion (7, 10)
- Russell Hagen – electric guitar (4, 8, 9)
- Freebo – fretless bass (1–5, 8–11), tuba (6)
- Stephen Bradley – drums (1–6, 8, 9, 11)
- Eugene Hoffman – cowbell (1), tenor saxophone (4, 8, 9)
- Steve Raitt – percussion (10), backing vocals (10)
- Junior Wells – harmonica (2, 4, 6, 7)
- A.C. Reed – tenor saxophone (1, 4, 8, 9)
- Maurice Jacox – baritone saxophone (3, 4, 8, 9, 10), flute (3)
- Voyle Harris – trumpet (3, 4, 8, 9)
- Douglas "Toad" Spurgeon – trombone (6)
- Reeve Little – backing vocals (1)
- Paul Pena – bass vocals (1)
- Chris Rhodes – backing vocals (8)

Production

- Producer – Willie Murphy
- Engineers – Dave Ray and Sylvia Ray
- Recorded at Sweet Jane, Ltd. (Cushing, Minnesota).
- Remixing – Kendall Pacios
- Series Producer – Gregg Geller
- Project Coordinator – Jo Motta
- Remastering – Patrick Krauss
- Liner Notes – Bonnie Raitt
