= Tucker strike =

1913 strike in Tucker, Utah

The Tucker strike was a 1913 strike action organized by the Industrial Workers of the World (IWW) against the Utah Construction Company's railroad tracklaying operation.
