= John Koerner =

American singer-songwriter (1938–2024)

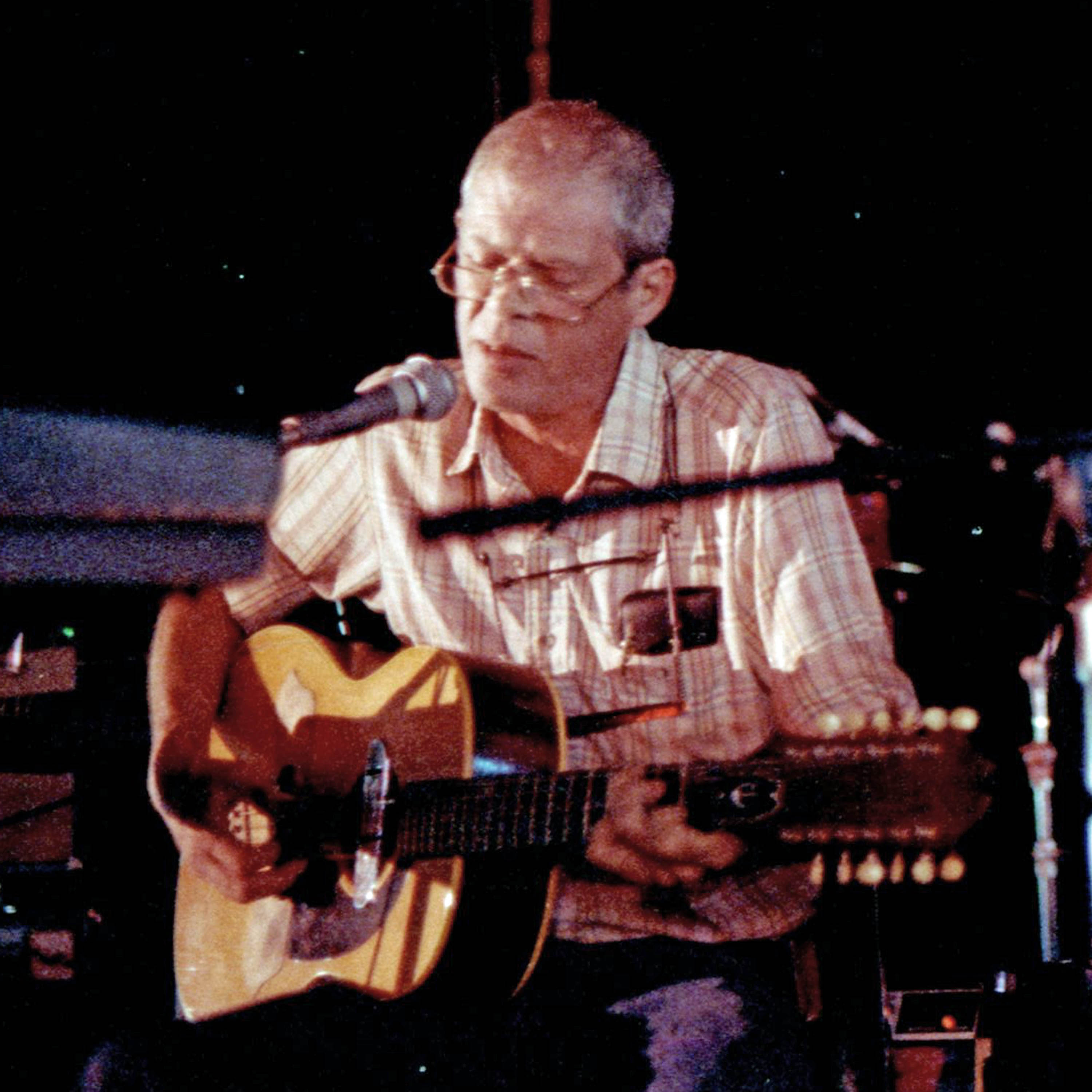
- Koerner in 1993

Background information
- Also known as: "Spider" John Koerner
- Born: August 31, 1938; Rochester, New York, U.S.
- Origin: St. Paul, Minnesota, U.S.
- Died: May 18, 2024 (aged 85) Minneapolis, Minnesota, U.S.
- Genres: Blues
- Occupations: Singer-songwriter; guitarist
- Instruments: Vocals; guitar; harmonica
- Years active: 1963–2024
- Labels: Elektra; Red House
- Formerly of: Koerner, Ray & Glover
- Website: Official web site

"Spider" John Koerner (August 31, 1938 – May 18, 2024) was an American guitarist, singer, and songwriter. He was best known as a guitarist and vocalist in the blues trio Koerner, Ray & Glover, with Dave Ray and Tony Glover. He also made albums as a solo performer and with Willie Murphy, and was an important mentor to the young Bob Dylan.

In a profile of Koerner for the magazine fRoots in 2010, folk musician Ian Anderson wrote that "Spider John Koerner is an American national treasure, a genuine folk blues hero. Bizarrely, most of his fellow countrypersons remain blissfully unaware of this, in spite of his being one of the key figures of the 1960s folk boom." The Encyclopedia of Popular Music called him "one of the most talented songwriters of his generation."

== Early life and education ==
Koerner was born on August 31, 1938, in Rochester, New York, to Marion and Allan Koerner. His father was a Methodist minister, as had been his grandfather and great-grandfather. The family also lived briefly in Oak Ridge, Tennessee, during World War II. He worked at an automobile shop and gained the nickname "Spider" because he would climb up shelves to reach parts.

In 1956, he began attending the University of Minnesota, majoring in aeronautical engineering. He started playing guitar in his second year and left college to tour the United States. He lived in Los Angeles and later enlisted in the Marines. He went through boot camp in San Diego and went into training for the infantry, but changed his mind and was able to leave the military after getting into a serious car crash. While in California, he discovered folk-music clubs for the first time.

== Music career ==
Koerner returned to Minnesota and became involved in the Minneapolis music scene, where he met Dave Ray and Tony Glover. They formed a loose-knit trio, releasing albums under the name Koerner, Ray & Glover. They were also inveterate record collectors, particularly of old folk and blues discs; Koerner was particularly influenced by the Folkways Records compilation The Country Blues, telling one interviewer later that "listening to it expanded my understanding – I realised if you want to be like those people you don't copy 'em, no; you steal from them and write your own stuff." The group gained notice with their first album, Blues, Rags and Hollers, originally released by Audiophile in 1963 and re-released by Elektra Records later that year.

In a 1964 interview in Melody Maker, John Lennon called the record one of his personal favorites. In 2016, David Bowie told Vanity Fair that the album introduced him to the sound of a 12-string guitar, and praised it for "demolishing the puny vocalizations of 'folk' trios like the Kingston Trio and Peter, Paul and Whatsit, Koerner and company showed how it should be done."

Koerner was an early influence on Bob Dylan, who mentioned Koerner in his autobiography, Chronicles. Speaking of the early 1960s, Koerner later said, "We were all goofy, you know. We were thinkers and drinkers and artists and players, and Dylan was one of us. He was another guy."

Koerner was the first musician that Dylan met in Minneapolis, at the Ten O'Clock Scholar coffeehouse. Dylan wrote in Chronicles that "Koerner was tall and thin with a look of perpetual amusement on his face. We hit it off right away." Koerner was a few years more experienced as a musician, and took Dylan under his wing to teach him folk and blues songs. "When he spoke he was soft-spoken, but when he sang he became a field holler shouter. Koerner was an exciting singer, and we began playing a lot together", Dylan wrote. They performed often as a duo, but each also played frequently on his own. Around this time, Koerner also met Tennessee bluesman Big Joe Williams, whose modified nine-string guitar inspired Koerner to try similar modifications to his own instrument, including adding a seventh string so that he had two "G" strings an octave apart.

In 1965, Koerner recorded his first solo album, Spider Blues, for Elektra and appeared at the Newport Folk Festival accompanied by Glover. He continued playing on the folk circuit and joined with Willie Murphy to record Running, Jumping, Standing Still in 1969. The album received positive reviews, Crawdaddy! calling it "one of the most unique and underrated albums of the folk boom, perhaps the only psychedelic ragtime blues album ever made." (One song, "I Ain't Blue", was later covered by Bonnie Raitt on her debut album.) The duo split up in the early 1970s. Koerner pursued an unsuccessful career in filmmaking, retiring from music and moving to Copenhagen, Denmark, where he made the black-and-white film The Secret of Sleep.

He lived in Denmark for several years, and also worked there as a bartender, a department-store cleaner, and in a porcelain factory. When his interest in music returned, he decided to focus more on folk music than blues, and formed a new group called Spider John's American Folk Band that played frequently in Denmark. He moved back to Minneapolis and continued performing music in the traditional folk genre. In 1974, he released an album featuring his revised sound, Some American Folk Songs Like They Used To. Music writer David Dicaire, in his book The Folk Music Revival, 1958–1970, wrote that the album "announced a shift to more traditional folk songs rather than the blues-drenched material of prior releases and what fans had come to expect from him. It ignited his career at a time when folk was in serious decline."

After more than a decade, he released a new album, Nobody Knows the Trouble I've Been, on Red House Records in 1986. In 1990, Red House released a live album recorded at the World Theater in St. Paul, Legends of Folk, featuring Koerner with Ramblin' Jack Elliott and U. Utah Phillips, which Richard Meyer of Allmusic called an "excellent concert recording." Koerner continued to perform and release new albums from time to time, including 1992's Raised by Humans, 1996's StarGeezer, and his final album, What's Left of Spider John, in 2013. Koerner also appeared with the Koerner, Ray & Glover trio on the 1996 set One Foot in the Groove, chronicling a performance at Minneapolis theater Bryant-Lake Bowl, and with Glover on the concert album Live @ The 400 Bar in 2009.

A retrospective album capturing a solo live performance and radio interview recorded on the same day as a studio session for Blues, Rags and Hollers, March 1963, was released in 2010. The album was released by Mark Trehus, owner of the Minneapolis record store Treehouse Records and a longtime fan of Koerner, on his label Nero's Neptune Records, along with a re-release of Music Is Just a Bunch of Notes which included a video of Koerner's experimental film The Secret of Sleep.

Koerner performed at the Newport Folk Festival in Rhode Island in 2012. He played "retirement" shows at the Cedar Cultural Center in 2017 and 2019.

Koerner was a frequent performer and fixture at the West Bank bar Palmer's, where he spent so much time that he had his newspaper delivered there. When Palmer's was used as a filming location for the 2005 film Factotum, Koerner was an extra, and can be seen sitting at the bar next to Lili Taylor and Matt Dillon in one scene.

When he officially retired in 2023, Koerner donated one of his guitars, a 12-string Epiphone, to Palmer's, where it was placed on display in a glass case. When Palmer's closed in 2025, the guitar was gifted to the nearby Cedar Cultural Center, where it is showcased in the lobby.

Koerner also gave his 12-string Gretsch guitar to his friend Charlie Parr, a fellow blues musician, requesting that Parr continue using it on stage.

In a profile on Koerner for the magazine Record Collector in 2013, the musician discussed his relative lack of fame compared to musicians like Dylan and Raitt who came after him: "I think you have to really want that kind of success and adulation. And I'm just not like that. ... It's just not in my character to go chasing after fame."

== Legacy ==
In 2013, music writer Elijah Wald said that "Koerner was in some ways the most exciting artist in the folk-blues revival. He was the only young white artist who shaped a unique, personal style rather than trying to sound like older black performers. He made up his own songs, developed not only his own guitar style but a seven-string guitar, and had an incredible sense of rhythm. I've talked with many of the other players of that period, and all thought of him as particularly innovative and talented."

Music writer David Dicaire, in his book The Folk Music Revival, 1958–1970, called Koerner "a folk blues heavyweight" and said that "perhaps more than any other figure during the folk revival, he championed the bluesier side of traditional music." He also said that Koerner's time in Europe was important for the genre as a whole, writing that Koerner "made folk blues much more respectable by spreading it across many different countries."

== Personal life and death ==
Koerner was married three times, to Jeannie Buranen, Lisbet Gerlach Madsen, and Laura Cavanaugh. He had two sons and a daughter, as well as five grandchildren.

Koerner also was an amateur astronomer, and never lost the habit of tinkering from his never-completed engineering degree, designing and building his own telescope, boat, harmonica stand, and what an article in City Pages described as "a makeshift lawnmower assembled partly from a bicycle."

Koerner died of bile duct cancer in Minneapolis on May 18, 2024. He was 85.

== Awards and recognition ==
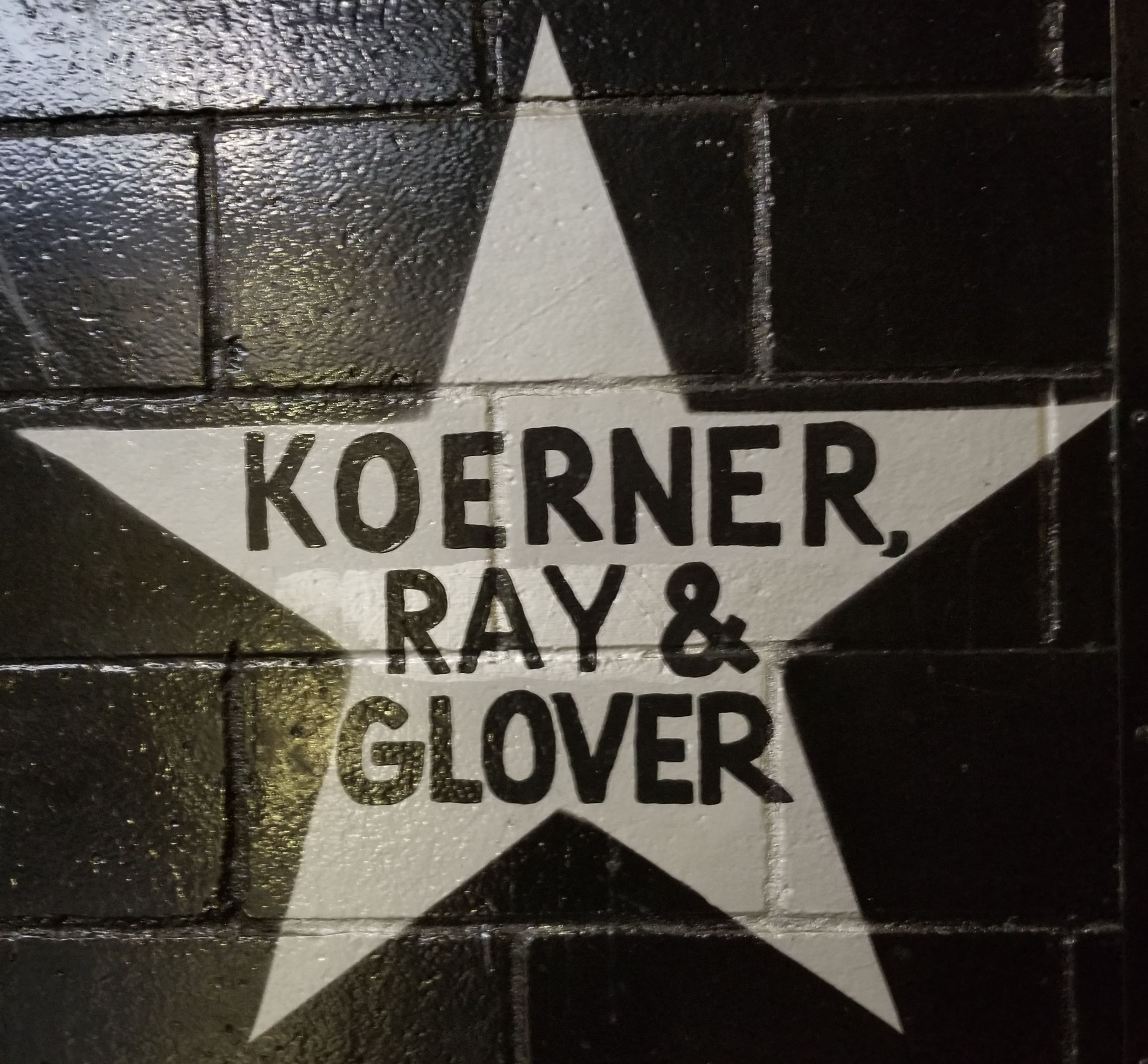
Koerner, Ray & Glover's star on the outside mural of the Minneapolis nightclub First Avenue

In 1983, the Minnesota Music Academy named Koerner, Ray and Glover "Best Folk Group", and in 1985, inducted them into the MMA Hall of Fame.

Filmmaker Don McGlynn made a documentary about Koerner, Been Here... Done That, in 2005.

In 2008, Koerner, Ray & Glover were inducted into the Minnesota Blues Hall of Fame under the category Blues Recordings for Blues, Rags and Hollers.

Koerner, Ray & Glover were honored with a star on the outside mural of the Minneapolis nightclub First Avenue, recognizing performers that have played sold-out shows or have otherwise demonstrated a major contribution to the culture at the iconic venue. Receiving a star "might be the most prestigious public honor an artist can receive in Minneapolis," according to journalist Steve Marsh.

== In popular culture ==
Science fiction writer Spider Robinson adopted his nickname out of admiration for Koerner and his music.

== Discography ==
- with Koerner, Ray & Glover
  - Blues, Rags and Hollers (1963)
  - Lots More Blues, Rags and Hollers (1964)
  - The Return of Koerner, Ray & Glover (1965)
  - Good Old Koerner, Ray & Glover (1972)
  - One Foot in the Groove (1996)
- with Willie Murphy
  - Running, Jumping, Standing Still (1969)
  - Music Is Just a Bunch of Notes (1972)
- with Ramblin' Jack Elliott and Utah Phillips
  - Legends of Folk (1990)
- with Tony Glover
  - Live @ The 400 Bar (2009)
- Solo
  - Spider Blues (1965)
  - Some American Folk Songs Like They Used To (1974)
  - Nobody Knows the Trouble I've Been (1986)
  - Raised by Humans (1992)
  - StarGeezer (1996)
  - March 1963 (2010)
  - What's Left of Spider John (2013)

== Sources ==
- Dylan, Bob (July 7, 2011). Chronicles, Volume One. Simon and Schuster. ISBN 978-0-85720-958-0.
- Colin Larkin, ed. (1992). The Guinness Encyclopedia of Popular Music (First ed.). Guinness Publishing. p. 1397. ISBN 0-85112-939-0.
- "Koerner 'Spider' John". The Encyclopedia of Popular Music (4th ed.). New York: Oxford University Press. 2006. ISBN 978-0-19-531373-4.
- Dicaire, David (September 9, 2011). "John "Spider" Koerner (1938-): Spider Web". The Folk Music Revival, 1958–1970: Biographies Of Fifty Performers And Other Infuential People. Jefferson, N.C.: McFarland. pp. 78–83. ISBN 978-0-7864-6352-7. OCLC 747713048.
- Anderson, Ian (July 2010). "Spider John Koerner". fRoots. No. 325. Archived from the original on December 5, 2023.
- Cartwright, Garth (May 21, 2013). "Folk Of Ages". Record Collector. No. 415. Archived from the original on May 19, 2024.
