= Blues, Rags and Hollers =

Studio album by Koerner, Ray & Glover
- Released: June 7, 1963
- Recorded: March 24, 1963
- Studio: Woman's Club, Milwaukee, WI
- Genre: Blues, country blues
- Length: 50:45
- Label: Audiophile AP 78
- Producer: Koerner, Ray & Glover, Paul Nelson

Koerner, Ray & Glover chronology
| Blues, Rags and Hollers (1963) | Lots More Blues, Rags and Hollers (1964) |

Alternative Cover
- Cover of the Elektra re-release in November, 1963

Blues, Rags and Hollers is the first studio album by American country blues trio Koerner, Ray & Glover. The album was released on June 7, 1963.

== History ==
The first album of the country blues trio from Minneapolis, Minnesota, had Tony "Little Sun" Glover on harmonica, "Spider" John Koerner on guitar and vocals, and Dave "Snaker" Ray on guitar and vocals. Koerner, Ray & Glover were part of the revival of folk music and blues in the 1960s. In his piece for No Depression magazine, Joel Roberts stated, "Like Bob Dylan, their Minnesota pal and fellow early ’60s folk-blues enthusiast, they combined a deep knowledge of the blues idiom with a sense of humor and irreverence that was absent from the work of many of their much-too-serious contemporaries."

Speaking of the trio's experience playing the music of Lead Belly, Blind Lemon Jefferson and other black blues musicians, Koerner later related, "I don’t understand the psychology of it, but somehow we decided to imitate these guys down to the note. And we decided to go out and drink and party, and chase women just like they did in the songs and all kind of shit. And when I look at it now, it seems weird to tell you the truth."

Despite recording, performing and being billed as a trio, the three play together only on the opening track, "Linin' Track". Of the other tracks, two feature Ray and Glover, one features Koerner and Glover, and the rest are solo performances.

Blues, Rags and Hollers was recorded in Milwaukee in a one-day session.

Originally released on the Audiophile label with a pressing of 300 copies, Blues, Rags and Hollers was quickly reissued by Elektra Records in 1963 without "Ted Mack Rag", "Too Bad", "Dust My Broom" and "Mumblin' Word". These tracks were restored when Red House digitally remastered and reissued the album in 1995. It was also reissued by WEA International along with Lots More Blues, Rags and Hollers in 2004. Koerner, Ray & Glover recorded two more albums for Elektra.

In 2008, Koerner, Ray & Glover were inducted into the Minnesota Blues Hall of Fame in the category Blues Recordings for Blues, Rags and Hollers.

== Reception ==
Professional ratings
Review scores
| Source | Rating |
|---|---|
| Allmusic | 4/5 stars |
| Allmusic 2004 reissue | 4.5/5 stars |
| Allmusic 1995 reissue | 4.5/5 stars |
| The Penguin Guide to Blues Recordings | 2.5/4 stars |
| MusicHound Blues | 4/5 stars |
| The Encyclopedia of Popular Music | 3/4 stars |

Allmusic critic William Ruhlmann called it "one of the defining albums of the folk revival. The Minneapolis, MN, trio, with Koerner and Ray on guitar and vocals, plus Glover on harmonica and vocals, were the quintessential young, white collegiate folk-blues enthusiasts from the North striving to play the traditional music as if they were old, black, uneducated musicians from the South. The thing was, they succeeded, not only in re-creating the sound ... but also in writing their own original songs that sounded authentic." Reviewing the 2004 reissue, Steve Leggett wrote, "In retrospect, Koerner, Ray & Glover got it exactly right, approaching their traditional material with a perfect mixture of reverence and fun, resulting in a kind of front-porch acoustic blues that still sounds pretty fresh all these years later." Thom Owens reviewed the Red House Records reissue and called it "a strong, catchy album that nevertheless sounds closer to folkies than the typical British blues record."

In discussing Elektra Records in his biography of Jim Morrison, author Stephen Davis noted that the signing of Koerner, Ray & Glover "gave Elektra considerable street cred" and described the album as "the coolest, hardest-rocking record of the whole folk revival."

In a 1964 interview in Melody Maker, John Lennon called the record one of his personal favorites. In 2016, David Bowie told Vanity Fair that the album introduced him to the sound of a 12-string guitar, and praised it for "demolishing the puny vocalizations of 'folk' trios like the Kingston Trio and Peter, Paul and Whatsit, Koerner and company showed how it should be done."

== Track listing ==
=== Side one ===
1. "Linin' Track" (traditional) – 2:16
2. "Ramblin' Blues" (John Koerner) – 2:42
3. "It's All Right" (Dave Ray) – 3:50
4. "Hangman" (Lead Belly) – 2:28
5. "Ted Mack Rag" (Koerner) – 1:28
6. "Down to Louisiana" (Lightnin' Hopkins, McKinley Morganfield) – 2:52
7. "Creepy John" (Koerner) – 2:38
8. "Bugger Burns" (traditional) – 1:37
9. "Sun's Wail" (Glover) – 1:51
10. "Dust My Broom" (Elmore James) – 4:04

=== Side two ===
1. "One Kind Favor" (Blind Lemon Jefferson) – 3:56
2. "Go Down Ol' Hannah" (traditional) – 2:55
3. "Good Time Charlie" (Koerner) – 1:39
4. "Banjo Thing" (Koerner) – 1:23
5. "Stop That Thing" (Sleepy John Estes) – 2:00
6. "Too Bad" (Koerner) – 1:50
7. "Snaker's Here" (Ray) – 3:41
8. "Low Down Rounder" (Peg Leg Howell) – 2:09
9. "Jimmy Bell" (Cat Iron) – 2:43
10. "Mumblin' Word" (Lead Belly) – 2:43

== Personnel ==
- Tony Glover – harmonica, vocals, liner notes, arrangements
- John Koerner – guitar, harmonica, arrangements, vocals
- Dave Ray – guitar, arrangement, vocals
