= Koerner, Ray & Glover =

Folk-blues trio from Minneapolis, Minnesota

- Origin: Minneapolis, Minnesota, United States
- Genres: Blues
- Years active: 1962–2002
- Labels: Elektra, Mill City, Red House, Tim/Kerr
- Past members: Tony "Little Sun" Glover "Spider" John Koerner; Dave "Snaker" Ray

Koerner, Ray & Glover are an American blues band formed in Minneapolis, Minnesota in 1962. The band featured "Spider" John Koerner on guitar and vocals, Dave "Snaker" Ray on guitar and vocals, and Tony "Little Sun" Glover on harmonica. They were notable figures of the revival of folk music and blues in the 1960s.

== History ==
Koerner, Ray and Glover met in the folk music scene around the University of Minnesota, when Koerner and Ray were students. Their common interest in folk music and blues led them to record and perform in various configurations, in solo turns and duets, but rarely as a trio. Ray suggested that it would be more accurate to refer to them as "Koerner and/or Ray and/or Glover". Their first album, Blues, Rags and Hollers, was released in 1963. Together they recorded two further albums for Elektra, Koerner and Ray each recorded a solo album, also for Elektra, and the three supported one another in touring. Glover wrote one of the first instructional books on how to play blues harmonica.

The trio appeared at the Newport Folk Festival, where their performance was recorded for the Vanguard Records album Newport Folk Festival 1964: Evening Concerts III and filmed for the documentary Festival!, released in 1967.

Koerner, Ray and Glover played frequently, separately and as a group, in the Dinkytown neighborhood of Minneapolis in the early 1960s. Bob Dylan knew them during his days as a nascent folk musician in Dinkytown, and wrote about them in his autobiography, Chronicles. Koerner was an early influence on Dylan, and was the first musician Dylan met in Minneapolis, at the Ten O’Clock Scholar coffeehouse. He wrote in Chronicles that "Koerner was tall and thin with a look of perpetual amusement on his face. We hit it off right away." Koerner was a few years more experienced as a musician, and took Dylan under his wing to teach him folk and blues songs. "When he spoke he was soft-spoken, but when he sang he became a field holler shouter. Koerner was an exciting singer, and we began playing a lot together", Dylan wrote. They performed often as a duo, but each also played frequently on his own. Dylan knew Ray as a "high school kid who sang Leadbelly and Bo Diddley songs on a twelve-string guitar, probably the only twelve-string guitar in the entire Midwest." Dylan and Koerner also played sometimes with Glover, whose harmonica playing Dylan admired, writing that "he cupped it in his hands and played like Sonny Terry or Little Walter."

Besides Dylan, the trio was an influence on many other musicians, including Bonnie Raitt. In the late 1960s they often played at the Triangle Bar in the West Bank area of Minneapolis, a popular hangout for bikers and hippies. They were also frequent performers and fixtures at the West Bank bar Palmer's; when Koerner officially retired in 2023, he donated one of his guitars, a 12-string Epiphone, to the bar, where it is on display in a glass case.

In later years they occasionally performed together, until Ray's death in 2002. Koerner and Glover continued to occasionally perform as a duo until Glover's death on May 29, 2019. One show with the trio at Minneapolis theater Bryant-Lake Bowl was released as the 1996 live album One Foot in the Groove. Koerner and Glover also released a concert album as a duo, Live @ The 400 Bar, in 2009.

The group's last surviving member, John Koerner, died on May 18, 2024, at the age of 85.

== Awards ==
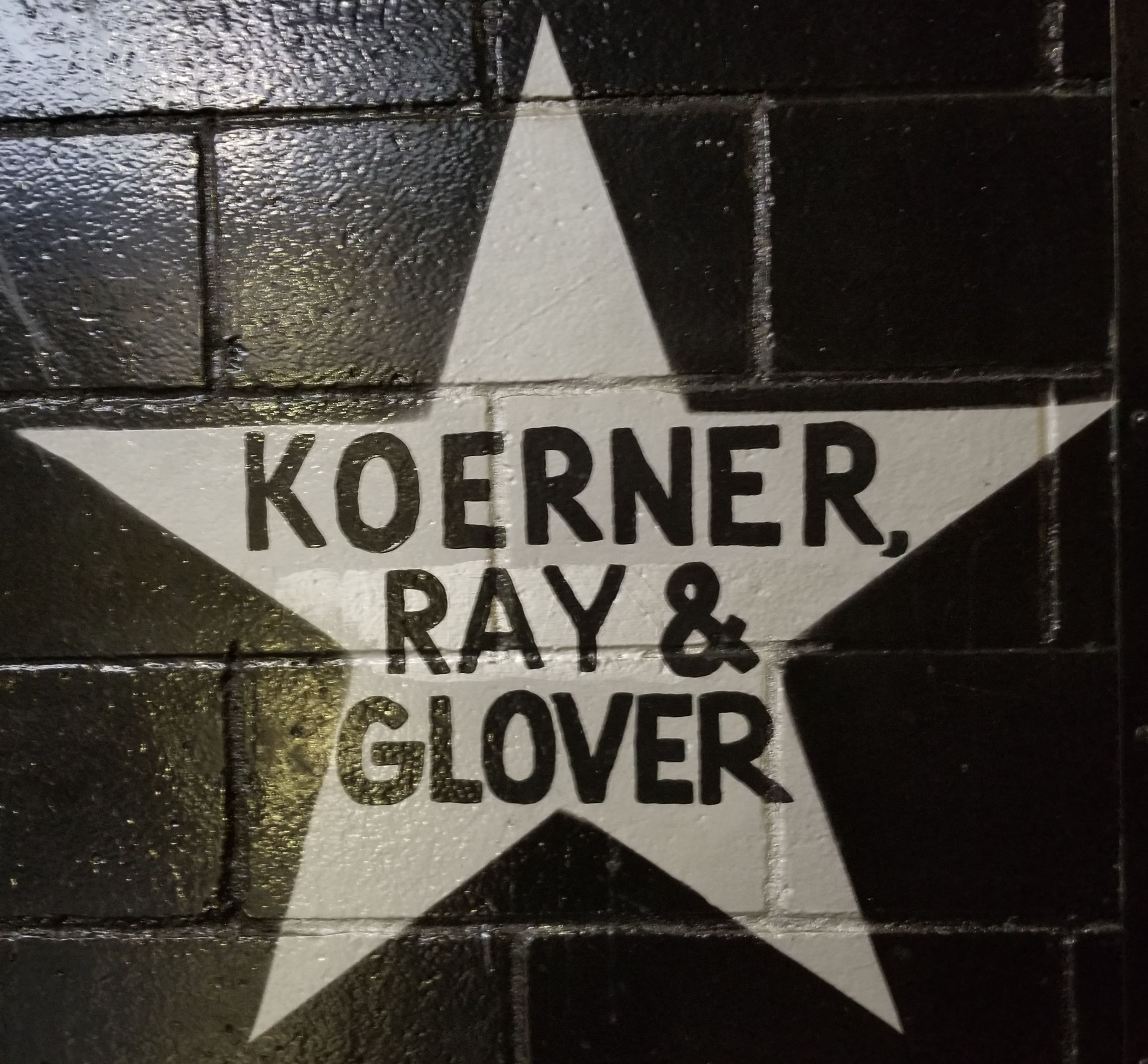
Koerner, Ray & Glover's star on the outside mural of the Minneapolis nightclub First Avenue

In 1983 the Minnesota Music Academy named Koerner, Ray and Glover "Best Folk Group" and in 1985 inducted them into the MMA Hall of Fame.

In 2008, Koerner, Ray & Glover were inducted into the Minnesota Blues Hall of Fame under the category Blues Recordings for Blues, Rags and Hollers.

Koerner, Ray & Glover has been honored with a star on the outside mural of the Minneapolis nightclub First Avenue, recognizing performers that have played sold-out shows or have otherwise demonstrated a major contribution to the culture at the iconic venue. Receiving a star "might be the most prestigious public honor an artist can receive in Minneapolis," according to journalist Steve Marsh.

== Discography ==
Studio albums

- Blues, Rags and Hollers (1963)
- Lots More Blues, Rags and Hollers (1964)
- The Return of Koerner, Ray & Glover (1965)

Live albums

- Good Old Koerner, Ray & Glover (1972)
- One Foot in the Groove (1996)
