= Tony Glover =

American blues musician and music critic (1939–2019)

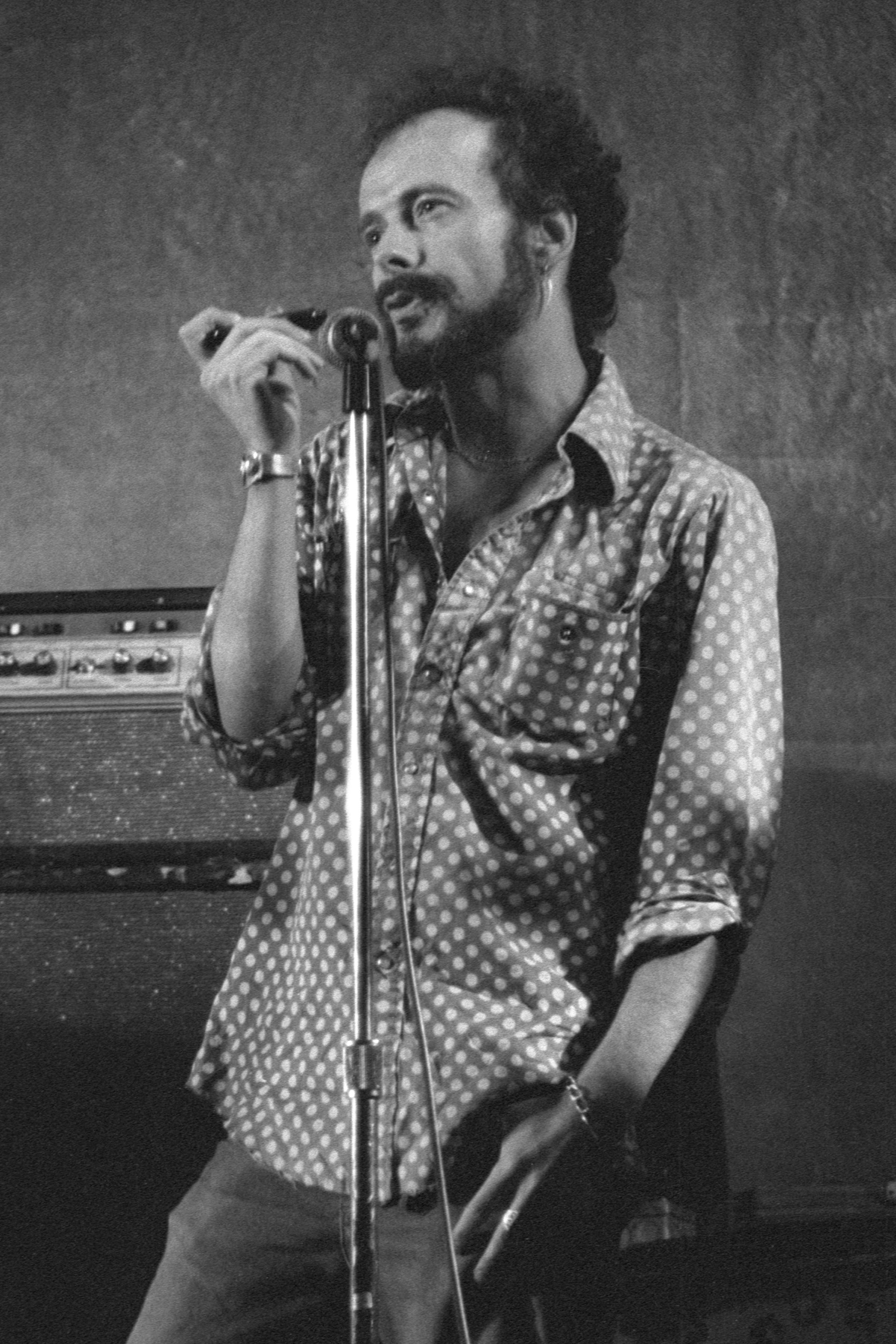
- Glover in 1982

Background information
- Birth name: David Curtis Glover
- Also known as: Little Sun
- Born: October 7, 1939; Minneapolis, Minnesota, U.S.
- Died: May 29, 2019 (aged 79); St. Paul, Minnesota, U.S.
- Genres: Blues; folk
- Occupations: Musician; author
- Instruments: Harmonica; vocals; guitar
- Years active: 1963–2019
- Labels: Elektra; Red House
- Formerly of: Koerner, Ray & Glover

David Curtis Glover (October 7, 1939 – May 29, 2019), better known as Tony "Little Sun" Glover, was an American blues musician and music critic. He was a harmonica player and singer associated with "Spider" John Koerner and Dave "Snaker" Ray during the early 1960s folk revival. Together, the three released albums under the name Koerner, Ray & Glover. Glover was also the author of diverse "harp" (blues harmonica) songbooks and a co-author, along with Ward Gaines and Scott Dirks, of an award-winning biography of Little Walter, Blues with a Feeling: The Little Walter Story.

== Biography ==
Glover was born in Minneapolis, Minnesota, in 1939. As a teenager he performed in various local bands, playing guitar before taking up the blues harp. In 1963 he joined John Koerner and Dave Ray to form the blues trio Koerner, Ray & Glover. From 1963 to 1971, either solo or in some combination of the trio, they released at least one album a year. The group never rehearsed together or did much at all together. Ray referred to the group as "Koerner and/or Ray and/or Glover".

Bob Dylan knew Koerner, Ray and Glover during his days as a nascent folk musician in the Dinkytown neighborhood of Minneapolis in the early 1960s, and wrote about them in his autobiography, Chronicles. Dylan, Koerner, and Glover sometimes played together, and Dylan wrote of his admiration for Glover's harmonica playing: "He cupped it in his hands and played like Sonny Terry or Little Walter."

In the late sixties, Glover was an all-night underground disc jockey on KDWB-AM in Saint Paul, Minnesota before forming the band Nine Below Zero. He also often performed as a duo with Ray and with Koerner, Ray & Glover reunion concerts. In 2007, he produced a documentary video on the trio, titled Blues, Rags and Hollers: The Koerner, Ray & Glover Story.

Glover was the author of several blues harp songbooks and a co-author, along with Ward Gaines and Scott Dirks, of an award-winning biography of Little Walter, Blues with a Feeling: The Little Walter Story, published in 2002.

Glover was a prolific rock critic, having written articles for the Little Sandy Review (1962–1963), Sing Out! (1964–1965), Hullabaloo/Circus (1968–1971), Hit Parader (1968), Crawdaddy (1968), Eye (1968), Rolling Stone (1968–1973), Junior Scholastic (1970), Creem (1974–1976), Request (1990–1999), Twin Cities Blues News (1996-2006), MNBlues.com (1999–present) and the Twin Cities Reader and City Pages. He also wrote liner notes for albums by John Hammond, Sonny Terry, John Lee Hooker, Michael Lessac, Sonny & Brownie, Willie & the Bees, The Jayhawks, and for The Bootleg Series Vol. 4: Bob Dylan Live 1966, The "Royal Albert Hall" Concert.

Glover taught harmonica to David Johansen and Mick Jagger.

== Death ==
Glover died on May 29, 2019, in St. Paul, Minnesota at the age of 79. In 2020 an auction of his memorabilia and effects netted $495,000.

== Awards and honors ==
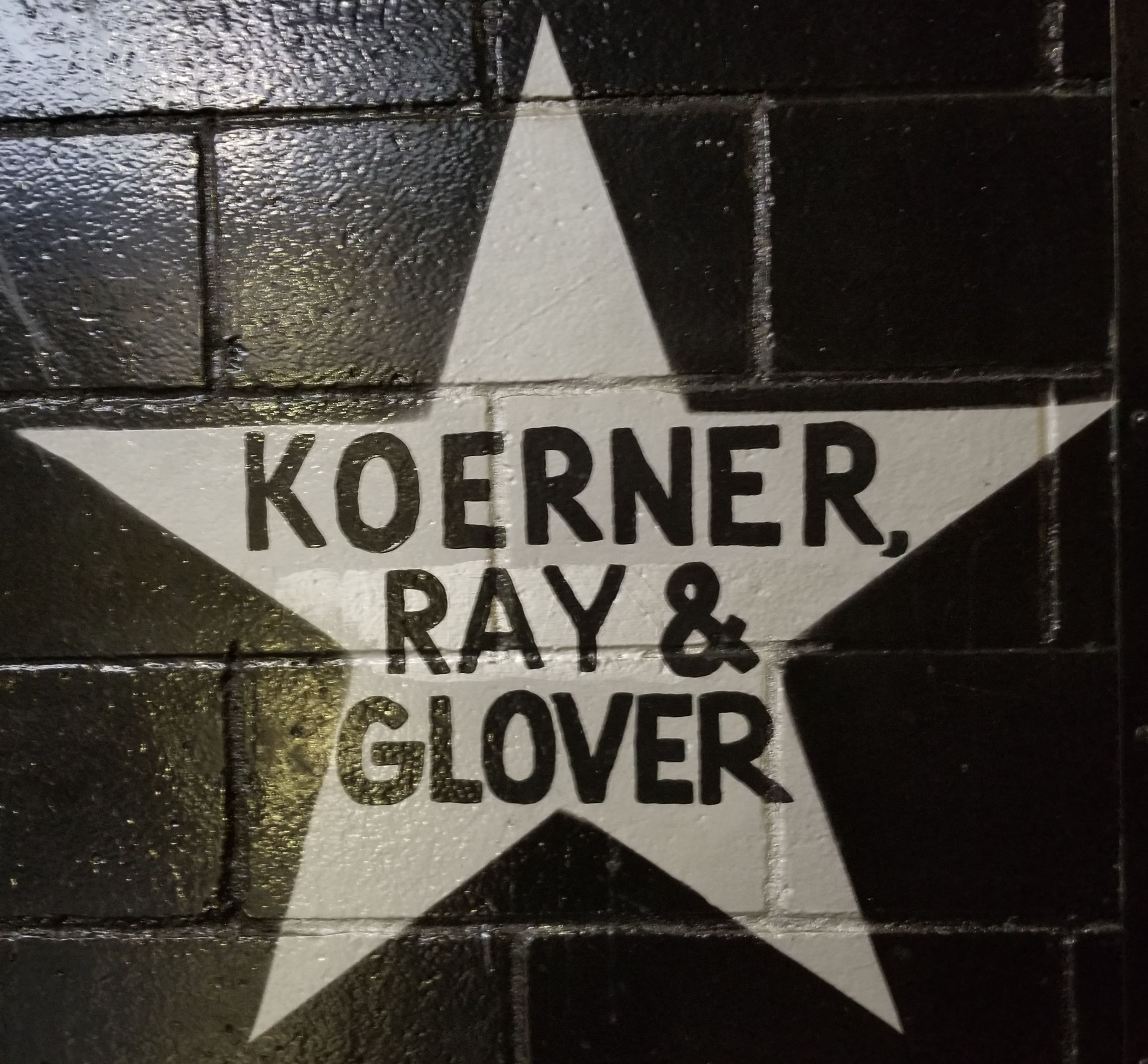
Koerner, Ray & Glover's star on the outside mural of the Minneapolis nightclub First Avenue

In 1983 the Minnesota Music Academy named Koerner, Ray and Glover "Best Folk Group" and in 1985 inducted them into the MMA Hall of Fame.

In 2008, Koerner, Ray & Glover were inducted into the Minnesota Blues Hall of Fame under the category Blues Recordings for Blues, Rags and Hollers.

Koerner, Ray & Glover has been honored with a star on the outside mural of the Minneapolis nightclub First Avenue, recognizing performers that have played sold-out shows or have otherwise demonstrated a major contribution to the culture at the iconic venue. Receiving a star "might be the most prestigious public honor an artist can receive in Minneapolis," according to journalist Steve Marsh.

== Discography ==
- with Koerner, Ray & Glover
  - Blues, Rags and Hollers (1963)
  - Lots More Blues, Rags and Hollers (1964)
  - The Return of Koerner, Ray & Glover (1965)
  - Good Old Koerner, Ray & Glover (1972)
  - One Foot in the Groove (1996)
- with Dave Ray
  - Legends in Their Spare Time (1987)
  - Ashes in My Whiskey (1990)
  - Picture Has Faded (1993)
- with John Koerner
  - Live @ The 400 Bar (2009)
- with V3 (w. Galen Michaelson and Jon Rodine)
  - V3 (2004)
