= Dave "Snaker" Ray =

American blues singer and guitarist (1943–2002)

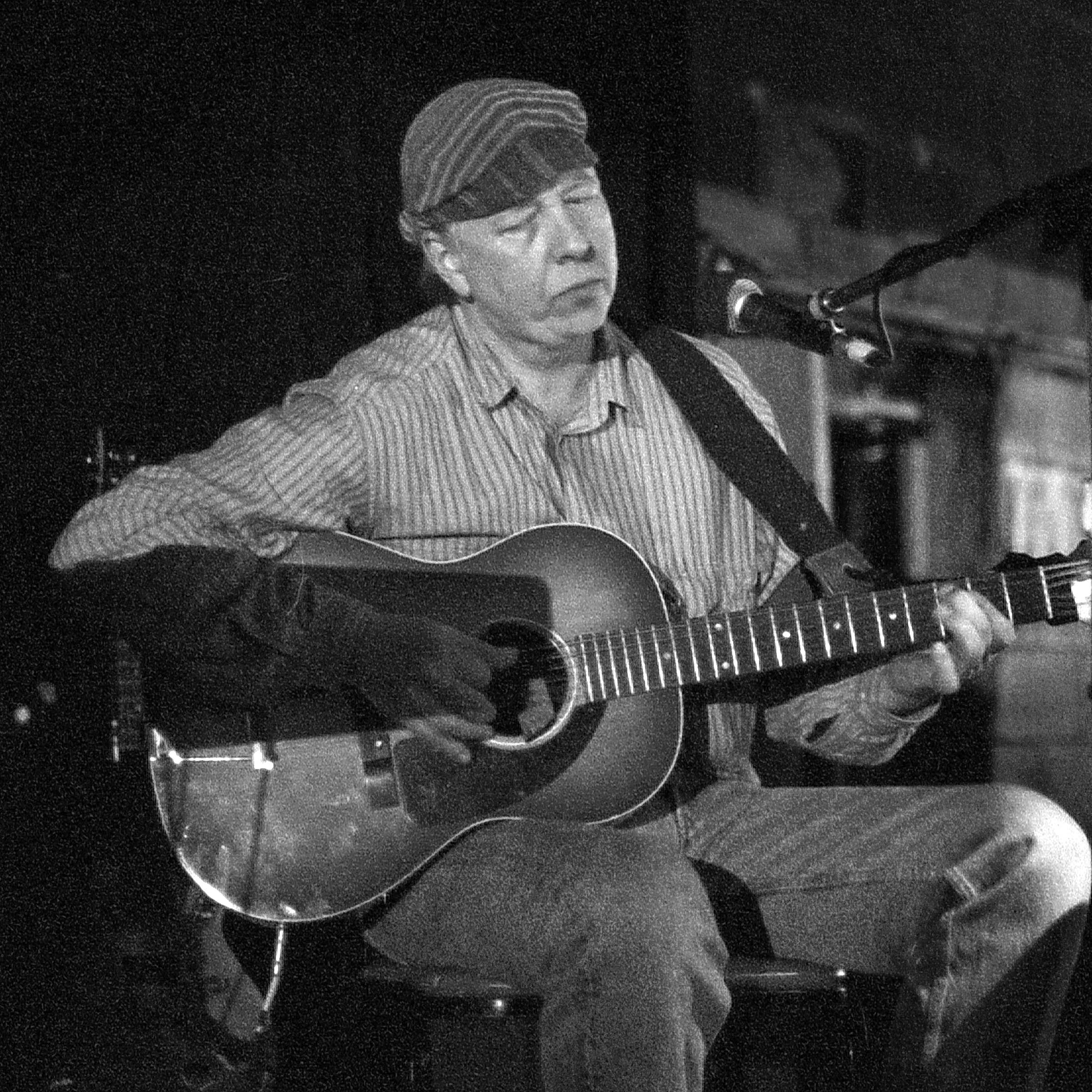
- Dave Ray in 1993

Background information
- Also known as: Dave "Snaker" Ray
- Born: James David Ray; August 17, 1943; St. Paul, Minnesota, U.S.
- Died: November 28, 2002 (aged 59) Minneapolis, Minnesota, U.S.
- Genres: Blues
- Occupations: Singer-songwriter; guitarist
- Instruments: Vocals; guitar
- Years active: 1963–2002
- Labels: Elektra; Red House
- Formerly of: Koerner, Ray & Glover

Dave "Snaker" Ray (August 17, 1943 – November 28, 2002) was an American blues singer and guitarist from St. Paul, Minnesota, and was associated with Spider John Koerner and Tony "Little Sun" Glover in the early Sixties folk revival. Together, the three released albums under the name Koerner, Ray & Glover. They gained notice with their album Blues, Rags and Hollers, originally released by Audiophile in 1963 and re-released by Elektra Records later that year.

== Biography ==
Born James David Ray, he was the eldest child of James and Nellie Ray. Nellie played the organ well into her eighties. In this teens, he was inspired by a Segovia concert, and his parents gave him a gut-string guitar. He and his brother Tom took classical guitar lessons for about a year. Ray's youngest brother, Max, started on the clarinet and then moved on to the saxophone. On occasion Tom would play piano and Max saxophone in various iterations of Ray's local bands. Max Ray went on to have a successful musical career with the Wallets and Gondwana.

Koerner, Ray and Glover met in the folk music scene around the University of Minnesota, when Koerner and Ray were students. The years from 1963 to 1971 were prolific for the three musicians. Either solo or in some combination of the trio, they released at least one album a year. The group never rehearsed together or did much at all together. Ray liked to call the group, "Koerner and/or Ray and/or Glover".

Bob Dylan knew Koerner, Ray and Glover during his days as a nascent folk musician in Dinkytown, a commercial district in Minneapolis, in the early 1960s, and wrote about them in his autobiography, Chronicles. Dylan wrote that he knew Ray as a "high school kid who sang Leadbelly and Bo Diddley songs on a twelve-string guitar, probably the only twelve-string guitar in the entire Midwest."

In 1967, Ray was in a motorcycle accident and broke his wrist. While in a cast, he relearned to play the guitar with a flat pick.

In 1969, Ray teamed up with Will Donicht as the band Bamboo, to record an electric folk-rock album in New York for Elektra Records. The album featured original and creative lyrics and instrumentals. Ray became disillusioned with Elektra and the commercial recording industry in general and was determined to set up his recording studio and become a record producer. With funding from his first wife's aunt, Jane Westley, Ray created a recording company, "Sweet Jane Ltd." Their first project was recording the debut album of Bonnie Raitt, which also featured Junior Wells. Sweet Jane built a recording studio outside of Cushing, Minnesota in the early 1970s. The Minneapolis-based Willie and the Bees recorded an album there with Ray. At this point, Ray had already released a number of albums both solo and with Koerner and Glover. He released his solo album, Kidman, on SJL in 1977.

In the late 1970s, playing and recording music became a less viable option for Ray. As a stopgap measure, he bought into his father's insurance business, James Ray Associates. Determined to continue playing music, Ray lined up steady gigs at local bars and restaurants after hours. Glover joined him on many of these jobs. For almost a decade, Ray led a double life as insurance agent and blues musician. He released a few live recordings and studio albums during this time.

In the late 1980s, Ray sold the insurance business to a large underwriter. Ray played gigs and festivals around the country. Willie Murphy said after Ray's death, "It's too bad he had to die when he did, he was kind of getting the hang of it." Ray devoted many hours to diligent practice, running through the paces of guitar greats like Charlie Christian and Freddie Green.

In 1998, Ray and Glover joined with Camile Baudoin and Reggie Scanlan of the Radiators to form a short-lived band, the Back Porch Rockers, which released the album By the Water in 2000.

Ray's last album, which he sold on his website, was A Hollowbody Experience, by the 6L6 Band, which featured Ray on guitar and vocals, Jeff Dagenhardt on guitar and Dave Kasik on bass. Dagenhardt and Kasik both reside in Milwaukee, Wisconsin. The 6L6 CD was released in 2002, the year Dave Ray died. Fittingly, the last track was "It's All Over Now."

== Death ==
Ray was diagnosed with lung cancer in May 2002. He died on Thanksgiving day, November 28, at his home in Minneapolis, Minnesota. He had chosen not to take any aggressive treatment for his cancer and he continued playing, most notably at a blues folk conference in Princeton, New Jersey, until his death. Ray is survived by his wife Mary Jane Mueller, son Barnaby Ray and daughter Nadine Ray.

== Awards and honors ==
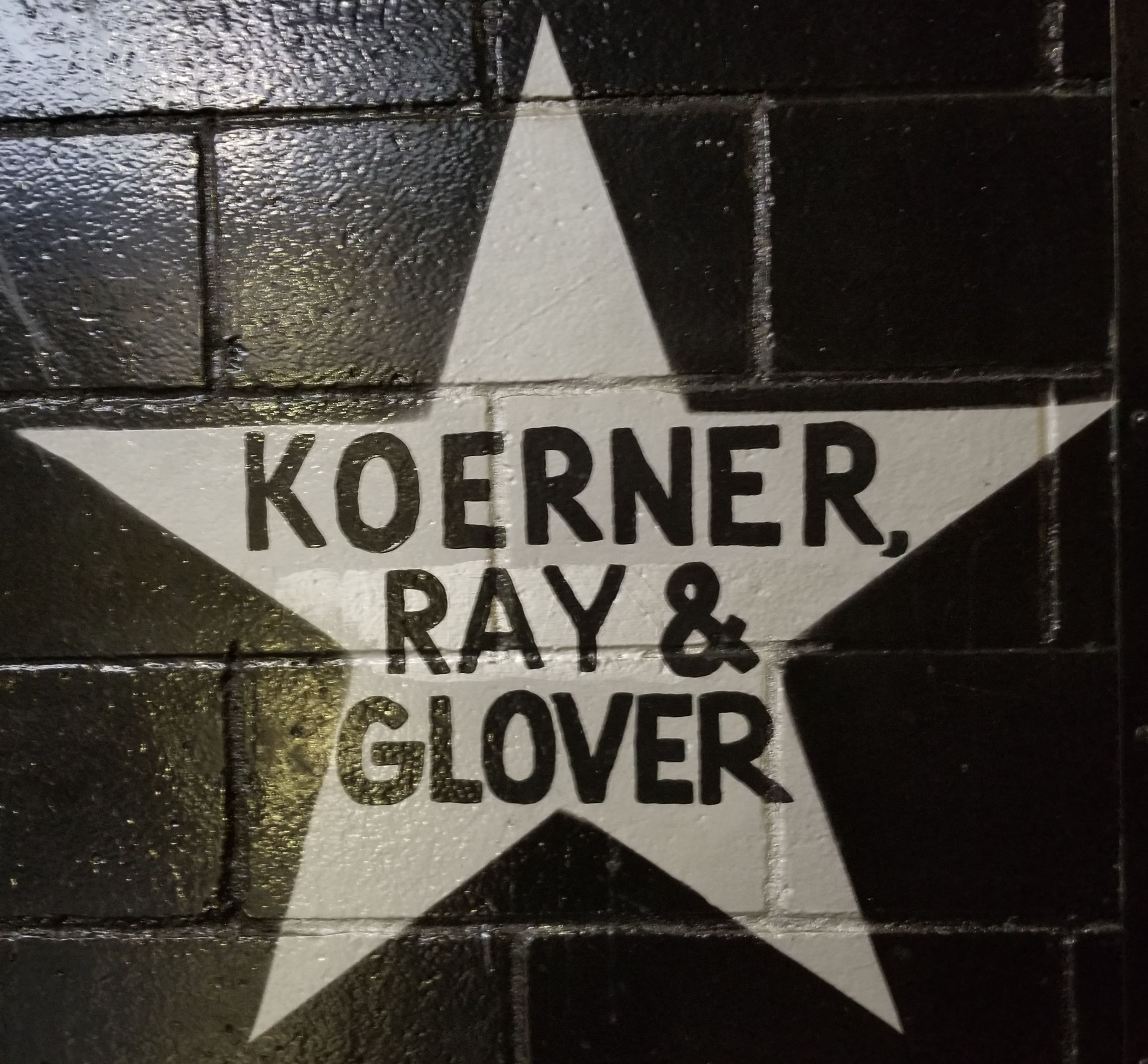
Koerner, Ray & Glover's star on the outside mural of the Minneapolis nightclub First Avenue

In 1983 the Minnesota Music Academy named Koerner, Ray and Glover "Best Folk Group" and in 1985 inducted them into the MMA Hall of Fame.

In 2008, Koerner, Ray & Glover were inducted into the Minnesota Blues Hall of Fame under the category Blues Recordings for Blues, Rags and Hollers.

In October 2014, a segment of Franklin Avenue near his father's insurance office was named Dave Ray Avenue.

Koerner, Ray & Glover has been honored with a star on the outside mural of the Minneapolis nightclub First Avenue, recognizing performers that have played sold-out shows or have otherwise demonstrated a major contribution to the culture at the iconic venue. Receiving a star "might be the most prestigious public honor an artist can receive in Minneapolis," according to journalist Steve Marsh.

== Discography ==
- with Koerner, Ray & Glover
  - Blues, Rags and Hollers (1963)
  - Lots More Blues, Rags and Hollers (1964)
  - The Return of Koerner, Ray & Glover (1965)
  - Good Old Koerner, Ray & Glover (1972)
  - One Foot in the Groove (1996)
- with Bamboo
  - Keep What Makes You Feel Nice (Elektra, 1969)
- Solo
  - Snaker's Here (1965)
  - Fine Soft Land (1967)
  - Kid-Man (1977)
  - Snake Eyes (1998)
- with Tony Glover
  - Legends in Their Spare Time (1987)
  - Ashes in My Whiskey (1990)
  - Picture Has Faded (1993)
- with The Three Bedroom Ramblers
  - What Was the Question? (1995)
- with Back Porch Rockers
  - By the Water (1999)
- with Jeff Dagenhardt & Dave Kasik (the 6L6 Band)
  - A Hollowbody Experience (2002)
