= Minnesota Music Academy =

Non-profit music institution in Minnesota, U.S.

The Minnesota Music Academy is a non-profit music institution in Minnesota. The Academy gives out the Minnesota Music Awards, and also operates a music festival called The Icebreaker.
