= Willie Murphy (musician) =

American musician (1943–2019)

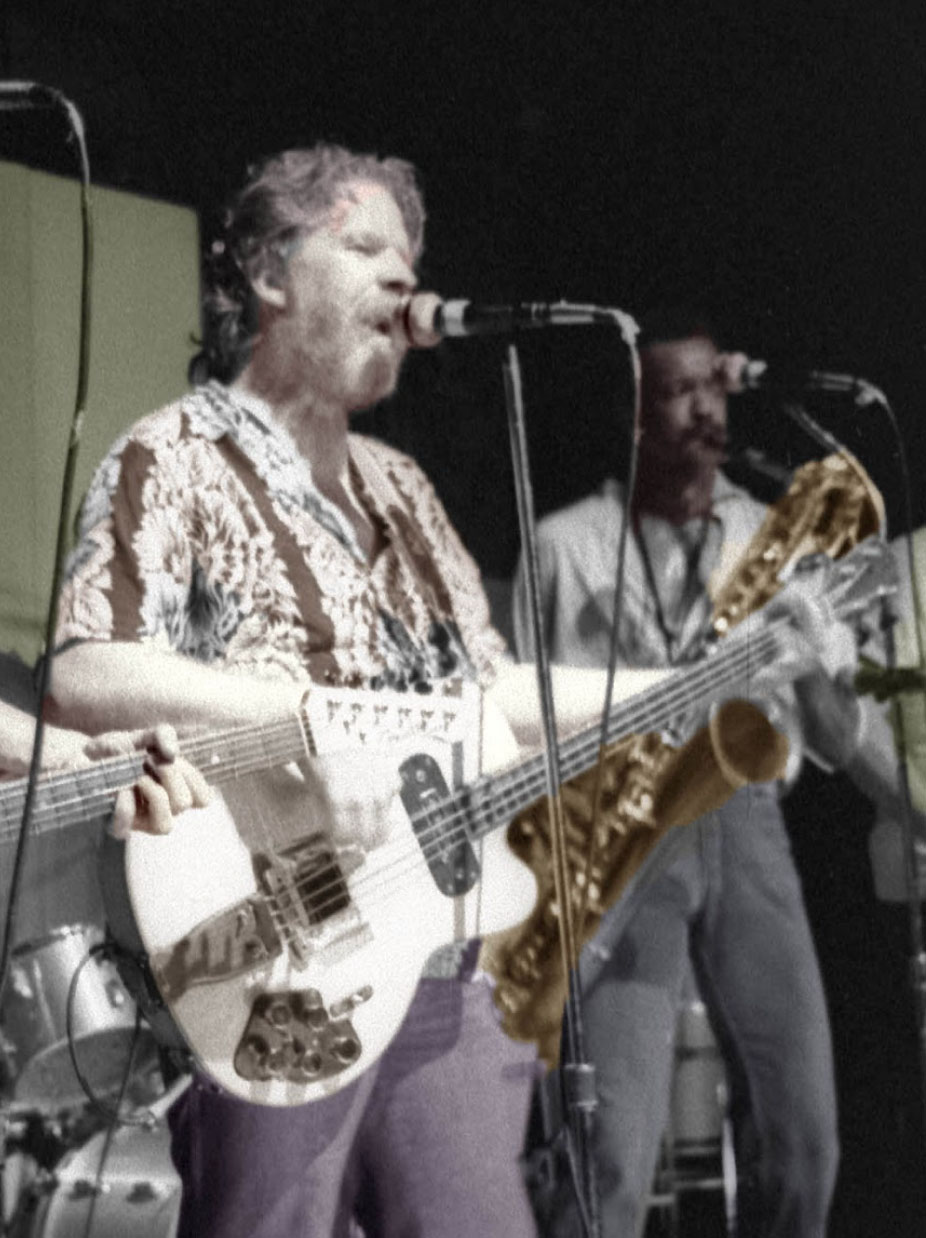

Background information
- Born: November 17, 1943; Minneapolis, Minnesota, U.S.
- Died: January 13, 2019 (aged 75)
- Genres: Blues
- Occupations: Musician, producer, songwriter
- Instruments: Vocals, piano, bass, guitar
- Years active: 1963 – 2019
- Labels: Elektra, Red House, Atomic Theory
- Website: williemurphyremembered.com

Willie Murphy (November 17, 1943 – January 13, 2019) was an American pianist, singer, producer, and songwriter. He is known for his solo work as a singer and pianist; as a singer, bassist and guitarist for the blues band Willie and the Bees; and for his collaborations with Bonnie Raitt and John Koerner.

== Early life ==
Murphy was born and grew up in Minneapolis, Minnesota, United States, in an Irish Catholic working-class family. He began piano lessons at the age of 4. His early musical influences were Little Richard, Fats Domino, Carl Perkins, Jerry Lee Lewis, and Ray Charles.

== Career ==
Murphy played on the folk circuit with John Koerner, and the duo recorded Running, Jumping, Standing Still in 1969. The album received positive reviews, Crawdaddy! calling it "one of the most unique and underrated albums of the folk boom, perhaps the only psychedelic ragtime blues album ever made." (One song, "I Ain't Blue", was later covered by Bonnie Raitt on her debut album.) The duo eventually split up, and Koerner pursued an unsuccessful career in filmmaking, temporarily retiring from the music business and moving to Copenhagen, Denmark. Murphy was offered a full-time job with Elektra Records as an in-house producer but declined, choosing to remain in the Minneapolis area.

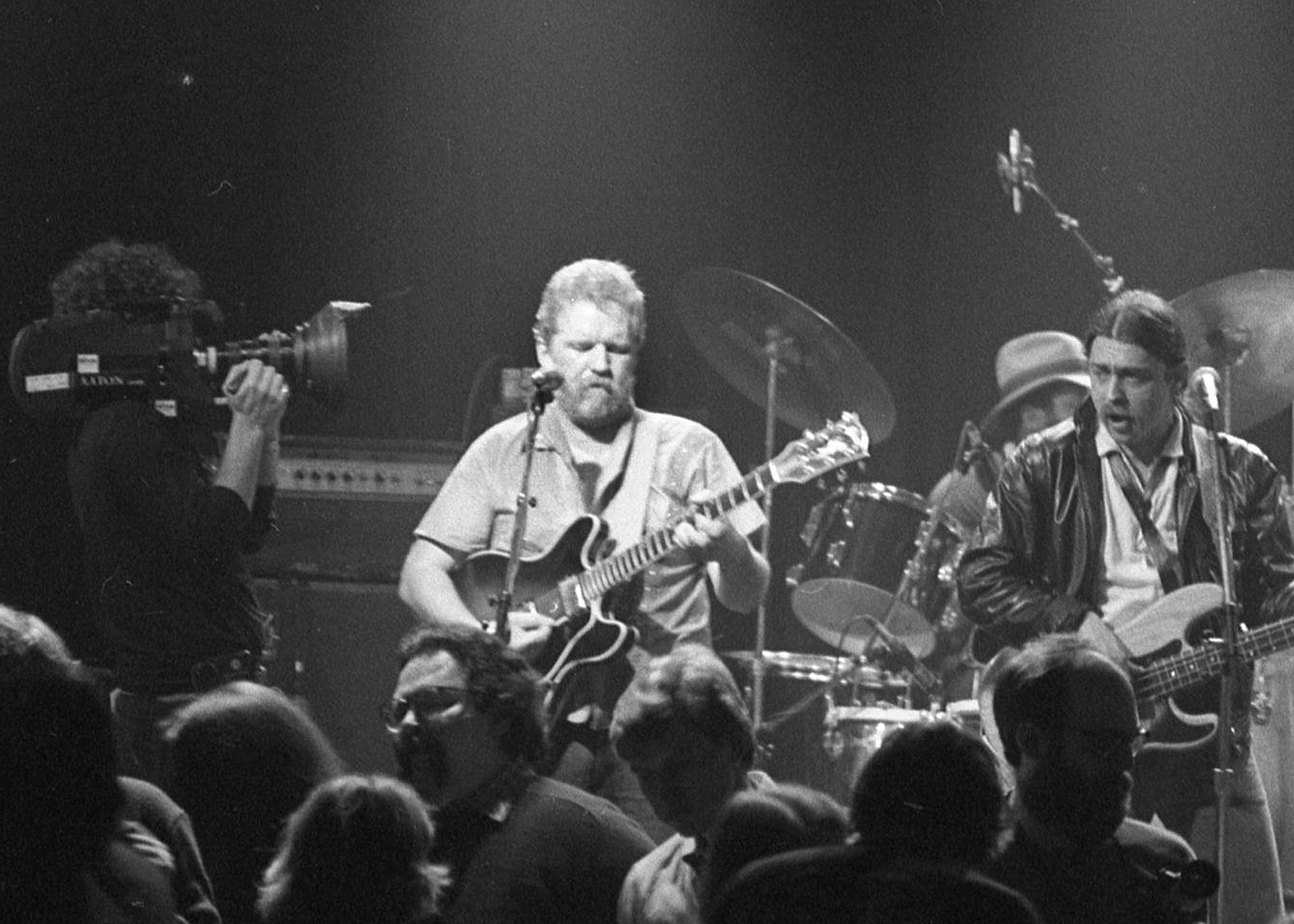
Murphy in Saint Paul, Minnesota, 1984

He produced Bonnie Raitt's 1971 debut album for Warner Bros. Records. Throughout the 1970s and 1980s, Murphy led the R&B, blues and rock group Willie and the Bees.

Murphy also played several times in Europe in the late '90s, and created a side band in Italy with bass player Andrea Lupo Lupi, performing six European tours between 2000 and 2010, and also recording an unofficial and rare live record.

Murphy performed on piano, bass, guitar and other instruments as a session musician for Raitt, Koerner, Greg Brown, Prudence Johnson, Little Milton, and many others. He formed the Atomic Theory Records label in 1985 and released albums by himself, Phil Heywood, Boiled in Lead, Larry Long, and various world music artists.

Murphy's double-CD release A Shot of Love in a Time of Need/Autobiographical Notes reached number 14 in Billboard's Top Blues Albums chart in 2010.

== Recognition ==
The Minnesota Music Hall of Fame inducted Murphy along with Bob Dylan and Prince in its charter class in 1990. In 2008, Murphy was inducted into the Minnesota Blues Hall of Fame.

In 2010, St. Paul, Minnesota, mayor Chris Coleman declared July 2 "Willie Murphy Day".

== Death ==
On January 13, 2019, Murphy died of pneumonia, brought on by numerous health problems, at the age of 75.

== Discography ==
- with "Spider" John Koerner:
  - Running, Jumping, Standing Still (1969, Elektra; reissued by Red House Records in 1994)
  - Music Is Just a Bunch of Notes (1972)
- Solo:
  - Willie Murphy Hits Piano/Piano Hits Willie Murphy (1985, Atomic Theory)
  - Mr. Mature (1988, Atomic Theory)
  - I Got a Secret (2003)
  - A Shot of Love in a Time of Need/Autobiographical Notes (2009, Red House)
  - DirtBall (2018, Muff Ugga Records)
- with Willie and the Bees:
  - Honey From the Bee (1978, Sweet Jane LTD)
  - Out of the Woods (1980, Sound 80)
- with The Angel Headed Hipsters:
  - Monkey in the Zoo (1997, Atomic Theory)
  - Hustlin' Man Blues (1998, Muff Ugga Records)
- as Cockroach Park:
  - Devil in the White House (2007, Muff Ugga Records)
- as Roy McBride & Willie Murphy:
  - Traffic (2008, Muff Ugga Records)
- with Willie Murphy Band:
  - Live in Italy (2005, Black Cat records)
- Film/DVD:
  - Why Marmarth? (a film by Digger Kohler, Dux & Geez Production) live in the Mystic Theatre
  - Survivors: The Blues Today (Cork Marcheschi, Robert Schwartz), 1984
