= New Riverside Cafe =

Coffeehouse and restaurant in Minneapolis, United States

Coordinates: 44°58′13.1″N 93°14′49.2″W

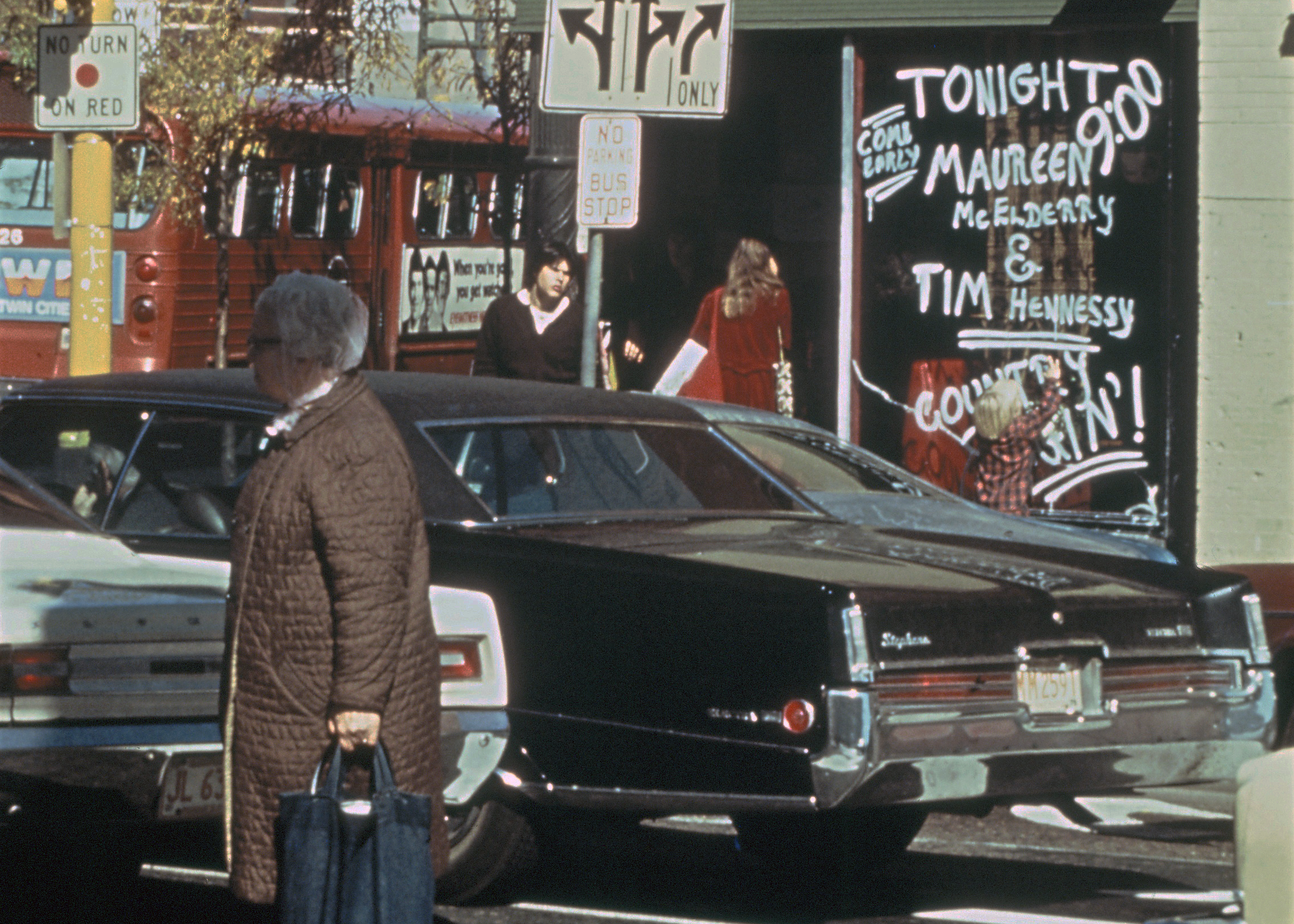
The corner of Riverside Avenue at Cedar Avenue, looking toward the New Riverside Cafe in the Cedar-Riverside neighborhood of Minneapolis, circa 1976. The window reads: "Tonight: Maureen Elderry and Tim Hennessy. Country [Illegible]!"

The New Riverside Cafe was a coffeehouse and vegetarian restaurant located near the University of Minnesota in the West-Bank neighborhood of Minneapolis, Minnesota, from 1970 to 1997. It became a center for political and social movements around revolutionary politics.

== History ==
The New Riverside Cafe was founded by the Episcopal priest William "Bill" Teska, with the intent of providing an independent center for the surrounding community, free from "establishment" meddling; Teska believed that government and corporate interests were trying to control the neighborhood's emerging post-1960s counterculture development. The cafe was created as a business, but within a short time it did away with the hierarchical business structure and opted for a collective style of management. As a result of this business model, starting in 1972, cafe revenue paid for all living expenses for members, including for members' rent and food. In the first few years of the cafe's existence, the majority of members were housed in one of three collectively owned houses in the West-Bank neighborhood. In order to provide a supplemental income for the establishment, the New Riverside Cafe also operated several side businesses such as a moving company, a vegetarian catering company, and an auto repair business.

== Political activism ==
During the 1970s, the collective was heavily focused on social and political activism. In 1975 and 1976, the building that housed the cafe was set to be demolished to pave the way for development of the Cedar-Riverside apartment buildings. In reaction to this, the members of the collective occupied the building in order to fight its planned demolition. They accompanied the developers to court and were eventually allowed to stay when the owners sold the building.

== Success and eventual decline ==
In the 1980s, the political activities of the cafe slowed while more emphasis was put on the economic viability of the collective. The cafe was remodeled in 1985, which led to an increase in both customers and revenue. At the same time the collective sold vegetarian products to health food stores and cooperatives in the Twin Cities area.

In the 1990s the New Riverside Cafe faced a number of debt problems from which it was unable to recover. Facing a debt of around $35,000, the cafe permanently closed its doors in 1997.

== See also ==
- Hard Times Cafe
- List of vegetarian and vegan restaurants
