= 100 Flowers =

100 Flowers may refer to:

- Hundred Flowers Campaign, a Chinese political movement
- Hundred Flowers Awards, an annual film award voted by Chinese audiences
- Hundred Flowers (newspaper), a Minneapolis underground newspaper of the 1970s
- Urinals (band), previous name of the punk rock band 100 Flowers
