= Riverside Plaza =

- Riverside Plaza (Cedar Square West)
- U.S. National Register of Historic Places
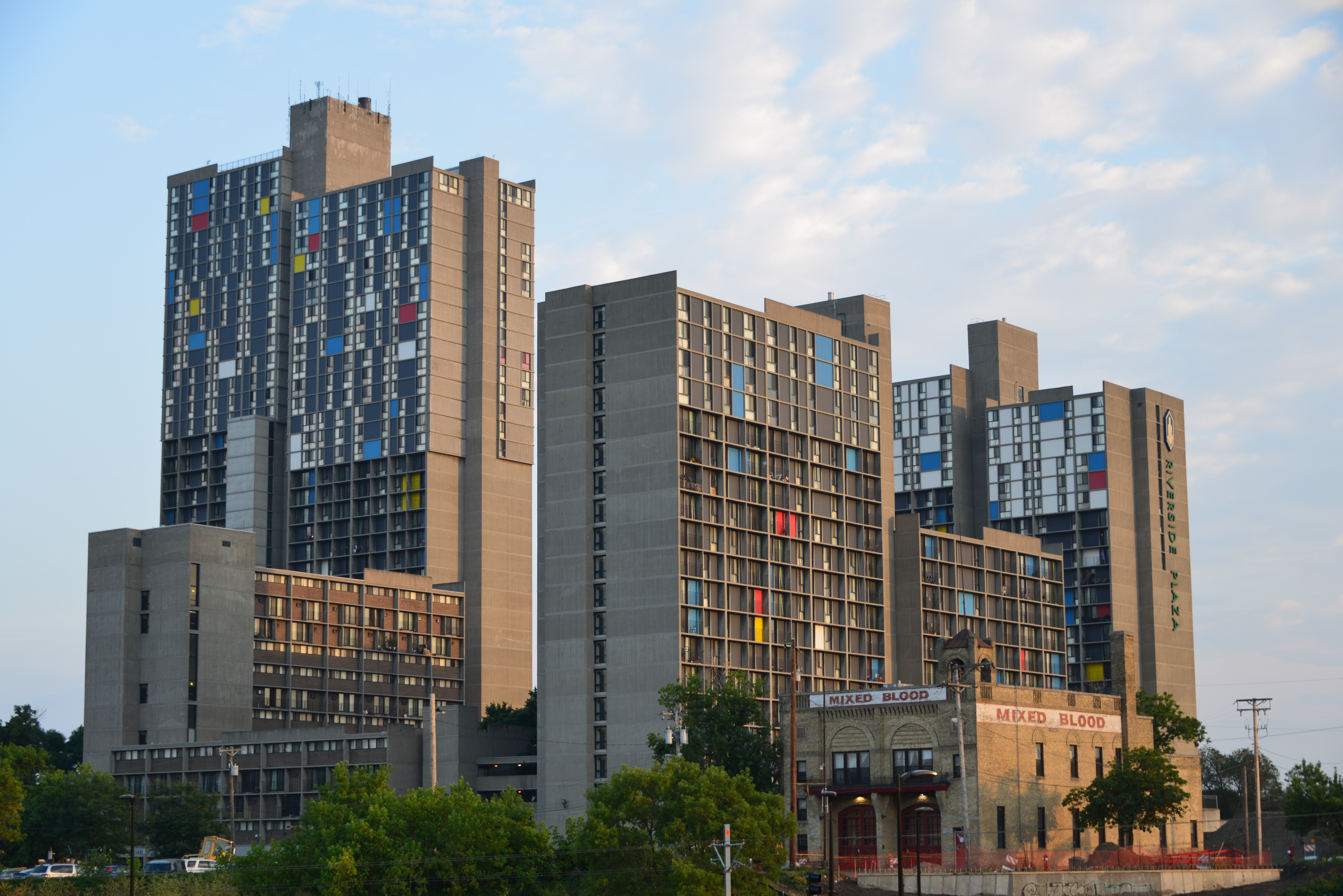
- Riverside Plaza and Mixed Blood Theatre at sunset in 2014

- Location within Minnesota Location within the United States
- Location: Minneapolis, Minnesota
- Coordinates: 44°58′12″N 93°14′56″W
- Built: 1973
- Architect: Ralph Rapson
- NRHP reference No.: 10001090
- Added to NRHP: December 28, 2010

Riverside Plaza is a modernist and brutalist apartment complex designed by Ralph Rapson that opened in Minneapolis, Minnesota in 1973. Situated on the edge of downtown Minneapolis in the Cedar-Riverside neighborhood, and next to both the University of Minnesota's West Bank and Augsburg University, the site contains the 39-story McKnight Building, the tallest structure outside of the city's central business district. Initially known as Cedar Square West, the complex was renamed when an investor group bought it out of receivership in 1988.

Riverside Plaza is composed of six buildings and has 1,303 residential units, making it the main feature of the city's Cedar-Riverside neighborhood. The buildings form a series of landscaped courtyards, featuring fountains, a clock tower, terraces, playgrounds, and various other amenities. Each building has a different height, intended to reflect the diversity of its population. Rapson was inspired by the time he spent in European cities, where people of different ages and levels of wealth coexisted in close quarters. The area was developed with support from the U.S. federal government's New Town-In Town program, and was originally planned to be part of a utopian design that would have seen 12,500 units spread across four neighborhoods housing a total of 30,000 people. Cedar Square West was the first project in the country to receive Title VIII funds from the U.S. Department of Housing and Urban Development (HUD), and it is the larger of only two New Towns-In Town that ultimately qualified for that program.

== History ==
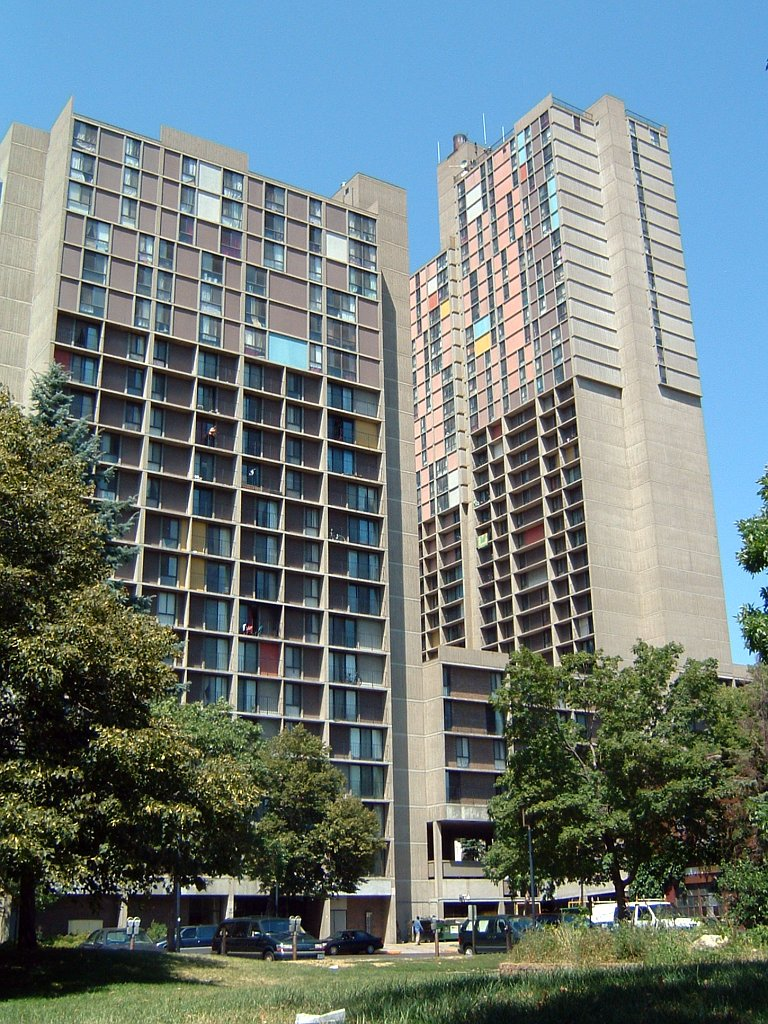
Riverside Plaza buildings in 2005, before renovation

The imposing concrete structures use multi-colored panels (attempting to emulate Le Corbusier's Unité d'Habitation design), which strongly dates the period of construction. Rapson's initial design featured large, blank panels on the building, meant to be painted by residents according to their own preferences. However, the federal government raised concerns, worrying that the panels could be used for antiwar messages or offensive content. To resolve the issue, the panels were simply painted in the primary colors seen today.

Diversity is the word they use frequently to describe their aims— diversity of income, age, race, and interests, of dwelling size and architecture. They also speak often of integration as an aim —integration of the diverse social elements; of varying land uses such as housing, commerce, recreation, and education. ... The proposed apartment structures are architecturally innovative. The protruding balconies promise an unusual pattern of light and shadow across the facades of both towers and low-rise buildings. Inside, many of the buildings will have "skip-stop" elevators with stops and hallways on every third floor. Stairways up and down one level will lead to the other floors, which will have apartments extending across the entire building because no hallways will be in the way. Some apartments will have two levels. Minneapolis Star. "'New West Bank' plans include all ages, incomes." Charles Whiting, February 10, 1970.

Interstate 94 and I-35W both pass nearby, giving good highway transportation options for occupants, but the corridors also act as barriers to pedestrians. Despite these drawbacks, the complex has been successful in maintaining a high occupancy rate, rarely dipping below 90% in the complex's nearly 50-year life.

The concept, publicly introduced in 1966, had originally been called Cedar Village. It came from a collaboration between Gloria Segal, her husband Martin, and University of Minnesota professor Keith Heller — who controlled a majority of the property east of Cedar Avenue — and the B. W. and Leo Harris Company, investors west of Cedar. The city was also involved after the city council directed its planning commission to prepare a redevelopment plan for the area in 1965.

Gloria Segal recalled the sequence of events that led to Cedar-Riverside being the nation's first New Town-In Town: “In February of 1970 we proposed a first stage project to the Minneapolis Housing and Redevelopment Authority. Preliminary approval was given in April of 1970. That spring a number of people began urging us to consider a New Communities loan guarantee application. A preliminary application was submitted in June and accepted in August of 1970. Final application documents were then prepared and a letter of commitment for a $24,000,000 guarantee was received June 28, 1971.” The project was to include housing for a range of incomes: 117 public housing units, 552 units subsidized by the FHA 236 program, 408 units targeted at middle-income tenants, and 223 “semiluxury” units.

The complex was thus initially a mixed-housing initiative earmarked for both high-income and low-income residents, including renters and leasers.

The original plan changed, however. Federal housing regulations initially placed all the semi-luxury units in a single building with additional amenities, creating a divide between residents and fostering an "us versus them" mentality. Another building was primarily home to residents of color, many of whom requested to live near others of their race, despite the developers' goal of promoting racial integration. With 40% of the complex's residents being students, turnover was expected, but a survey of first-year tenants revealed that 80% intended to stay for no more than two years, which hindered the development of a strong community.

The original plan was to build a pedestrian bridge across Cedar Avenue to connect with a future Cedar Square East, but since that was never built, just a stub remains. New residents of Cedar-Riverside, including students and counter-culture activists, organized a number of protests that ultimately slowed down large-scale development plans. Instead, they advocated for a vision that focused on preserving historic buildings and supporting local businesses, rather than replacing them.

According to Rapson, who designed the towers and still lived and worked in the neighborhood, the buildings' new owners did not take proper care of the buildings after converting the structures into subsidized housing to benefit from a 10% state subsidy in addition to regular rental revenue. Members of the media have used nicknames such as the "Ghetto in the Sky", and the "Crack Stacks" to describe the housing complex. A string of homicides in the early 1990s also contributed to a negative image. According to local police, however, neighborhood crime has fallen over the years following the deployment of a few additional patrol officers. The Plaza has also evolved into a lively haven for new immigrant families.

In 1993, Cedar-Riverside Community School opened around the Plaza. The school met the needs of the Plaza's residents, including its new immigrant populations. It operated in former commercial spaces near McKnight Tower and Chase House. The school closed in 2021. Brian Coyle Community Center, named after onetime city councilmember Brian Coyle, opened adjacent to Riverside Plaza in 1993.

As of 2011, Riverside Plaza has over 4,500 tenants living in 1,303 units, split equally between market-rate and subsidized apartments. The average duration of occupancy is three to four years, a relatively quick turnover owing to the upward mobility of the newly arrived tenants, who are using the apartments as a temporary housing solution while they get on their feet.

The complex was listed on the National Register of Historic Places on December 28, 2010. The statement of significance cites its importance as a well-preserved example of urban redevelopment spurred by the U.S. Department of Housing and Urban Development, and the first to receive Title VII funding. It is also locally significant as one of the most prominent examples of Ralph Rapson's work.

Most of the current residents of Riverside Plaza are Somali Americans. In October 2016, residents of the complex declined permission to HBO to film their upcoming series Mogadishu, Minnesota in their building.

== Renovations ==
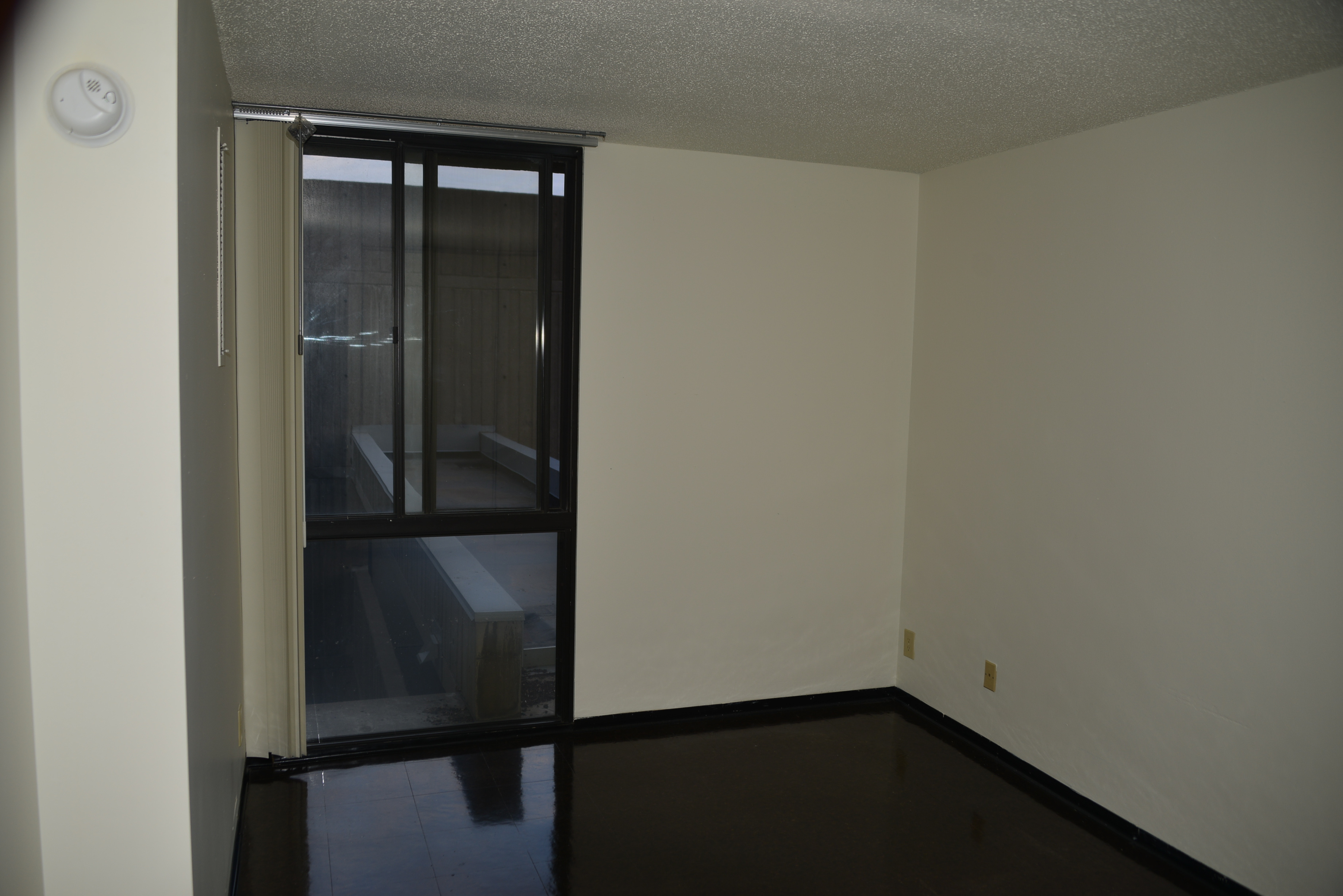
A vacant apartment inside Riverside Plaza after the 2011-12 renovation

In 2011, a major renovation of the then almost 40-year-old complex began, prompted by major problems with their mechanical, plumbing, and electrical systems. The renovation was completed in two years on a budget of $132 million, most of which came from private sources. The United States Department of Housing and Urban Development, which viewed the complex as an example of effective multi-family public housing, backed $50 million in loans for the project.

During the rehabilitation, improvements included the replacement of outdated systems with new, environmentally-friendly ones that comply with current codes. This involved replacing miles of deteriorated piping. Additionally, the original insulated aluminum windows were refurbished, historic concrete was repaired, and accessibility upgrades were implemented. The restoration repainted the faded colored panels to their original hues.

== In popular culture ==
Exterior shots of the complex were featured on television as the residence of Mary Richards in the final two seasons of The Mary Tyler Moore Show.

It is speculated that the color scheme of the Minnesota Timberwolves's 2022-2023 season City Edition jerseys was partially inspired by elements of Riverside Plaza's design; both notably have similar blocks of vibrant color.

== See also ==
- List of tallest buildings in Minneapolis
