= Cedar-Riverside, Minneapolis =

Cedar-Riverside West Bank
- Neighborhood
- Nickname: Little Mogadishu
- Location of Cedar-Riverside within the U.S. city of Minneapolis
- Interactive map of Cedar-Riverside
- Coordinates: 44°58′00″N 93°14′36″W
- Country: United States
- State: Minnesota
- County: Hennepin
- City: Minneapolis
- Community: University
- Established: 1849
- City Council Wards: 2,6

Government
  - Council Member, Ward 2: Robin Wonsley
  - Council Member, Ward 6: Jamal Osman

Area
  - Total: 0.549 sq mi (1.42 km^{2})

Population (2020)
  - Total: 9,000
  - Density: 16,000/sq mi (6,300/km^{2})
- Time zone: UTC-6 (CST)
  - Summer (DST): UTC-5 (CDT)
- ZIP code: 55454
- Area code: 612

Cedar-Riverside, also referred to as the West Bank, or simply Riverside, is a neighborhood within Minneapolis, Minnesota. Its boundaries are the Mississippi River to the north and east, Interstate 94 to the south, and Hiawatha Avenue and Interstate 35W to the west. It has a longstanding tradition of cultural diversity and settlement, with a robust arts tradition.

== History ==
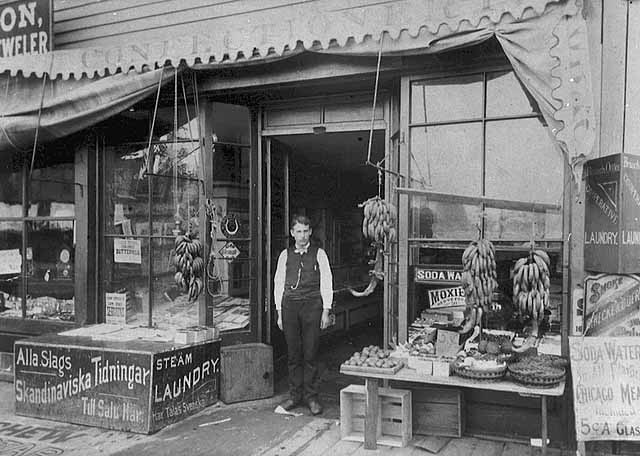
Samuelson's Confectionery 1890

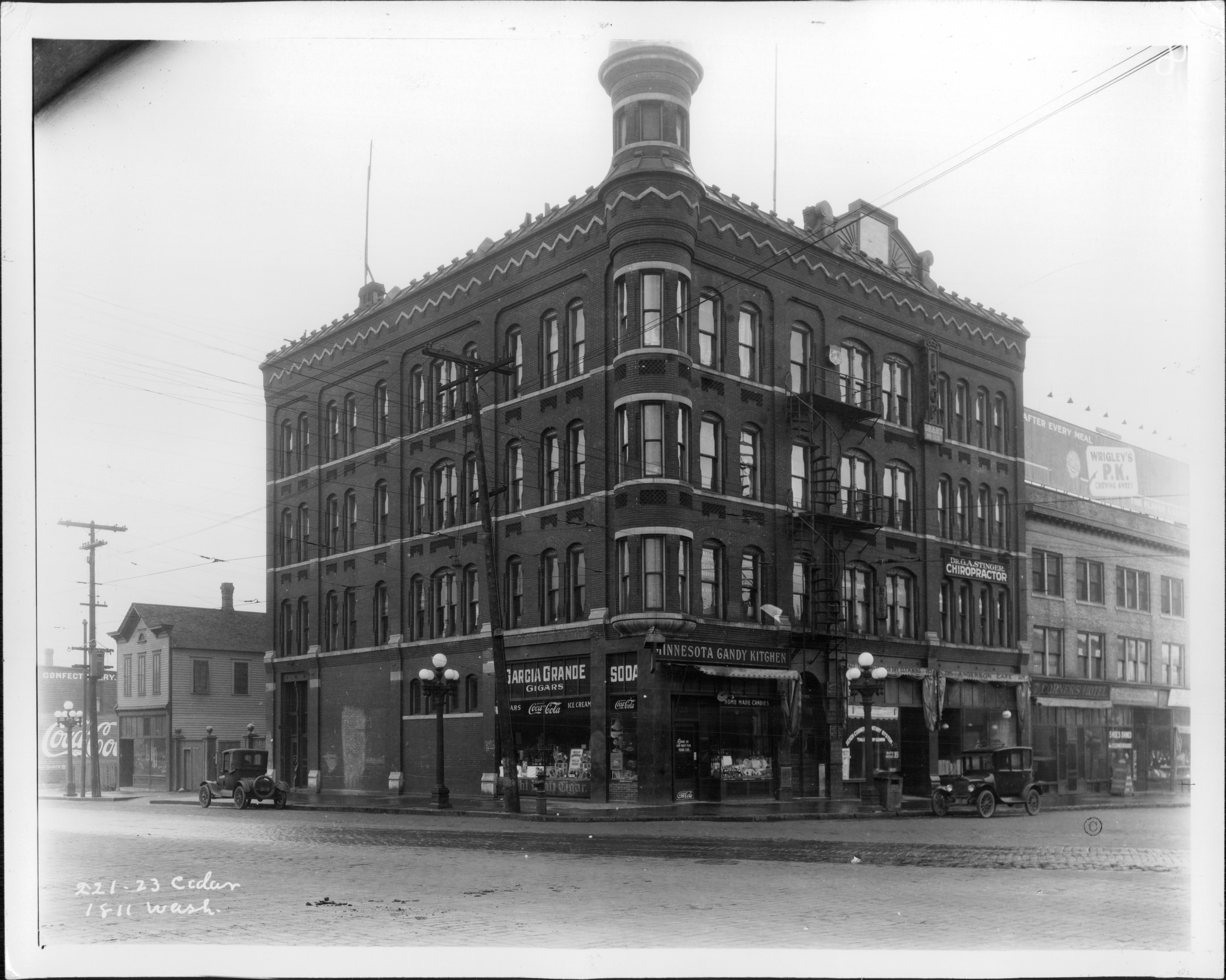
SW corner of Seven Corners, ca. 1920. Odd Fellows lodge is above the chiropractor's office on the Cedar Street side of the building. Washington is the side of the building that doesn't have any store fronts.

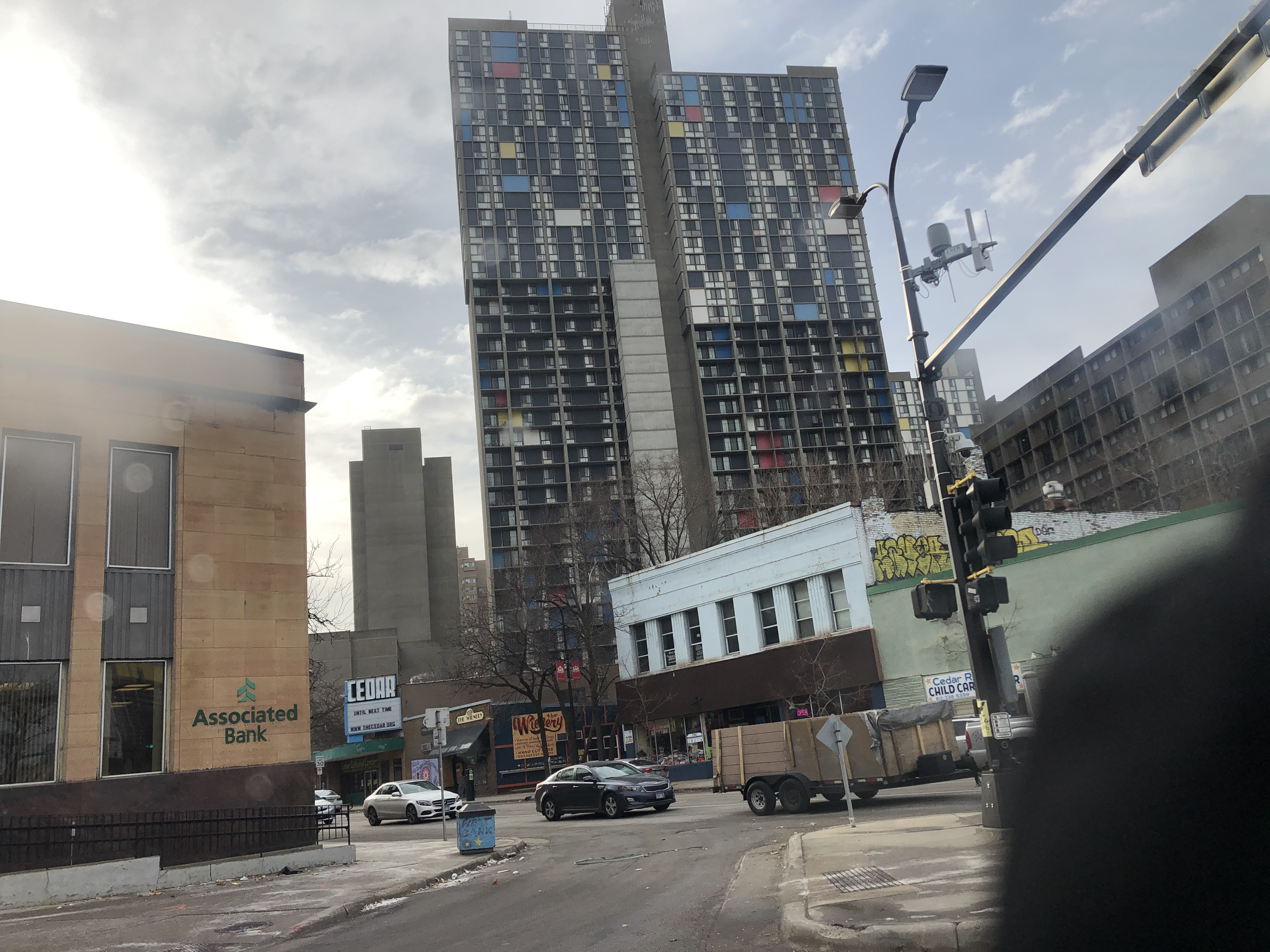
Riverside Plaza, Associated Banc-Corp, and other local businesses as seen from Riverside Avenue

=== Early History ===
The neighborhood has been a port of entry for immigrants since Swedes, Germans, and Bohemians began arriving in large numbers during the late 19th century. Cedar Avenue became a hub of the Minneapolis Scandinavian community in the late 1800s. Swedish, Norwegian, and Danish were spoken in many of the businesses, and in the early days, stars of Swedish American vaudeville entertained at Dania Hall, Mozart Hall and The Southern Theater.

Local businesses included Samuelsen’s confectionery and soda shop, Hagen's appliance store, Moberg’s Norwegian deli, and a host of other Scandinavian-owned businesses. On Cedar Avenue was Dania Hall, where the Danish community would meet. Built in an eclectic mix of Gothic and classical styles, the building included a dining hall and kitchen in the basement, commercial space on the first floor, offices for the Society of Dania plus billiard and reading rooms on the second floor. A theater/assembly hall on the third and fourth floors featured Scandinavian vaudeville acts and weekend dances. On the corner of Cedar and Washington, just before the Washington Ave Bridge, was the Breezy Point Tavern owned by Oscar Carlsen, a Norwegian immigrant from the turn of the 20th century. Oscar had come to Minnesota to work in the lumber camps and saved a stake to buy this tavern.

Bohemian Flats was a sub-neighborhood located in Cedar-Riverside. A shantytown underneath the Washington Avenue Bridge and the Northern Pacific Railway Bridge, it was home to many immigrants from Central Europe. Many of the homes were located on the floodplains of the Mississippi River and were affected by spring flooding. In the early 1930s, most of Bohemian Flats was condemned and demolished for the construction of a coal barge terminal.

=== Early Twentieth Century ===
Cedar-Riverside peaked in 1910 at around 20,000 residents. At the time, the neighborhood's political geography was roughly contiguous with Minneapolis' old 6th Ward, which was bounded by 10th Avenue, 7th St, and the Mississippi River; and the northern half of the old 11th Ward, which was bounded by 7th St, 10th Avenue, 24th St, and the Mississippi River. Men in the community had once worked in small businesses or as skilled tradesmen, railroad workers or in flour mills and breweries. In the 1920s, Cedar-Riverside declined as a core community due to the impact of Prohibition on the entertainment district. Into the 1940s, Cedar-Riverside remained heavily Scandinavian. Postwar immigrants from all over Eastern Europe then settled in the area. The junction of Washington Avenue, Cedar Avenue, and 19th Avenue was known as Seven Corners. The Cedar-Riverside area had been known as "Snoose Boulevard" (Snusgatan) because so many Scandinavians lived there.

=== Further area development ===
In 1973, the Riverside Plaza apartment complex was opened. Designed by architect and Cedar-Riverside resident Ralph Rapson, the tall buildings with their signature colored panels are a Minneapolis landmark and were featured as the residence of Mary Richards in later seasons of The Mary Tyler Moore Show. Dayton-Hudson corporation (later Target Corporation) was a consultant, then withdrew, for a proposed commercial development in the area in 1974. Many of the businesses that were established during that time — Martha's Antiques, the Whale Leather Shop, the Five Corners Saloon, Richter's Drug Store and Smith's Leather Shop — eventually went out of business, gradually giving way to newer stores and shops. The Depth of Field also closed in the last half of 2019. Brian Coyle Community Center, named after onetime city councilmember Brian Coyle, opened adjacent to Riverside Plaza in 1993.

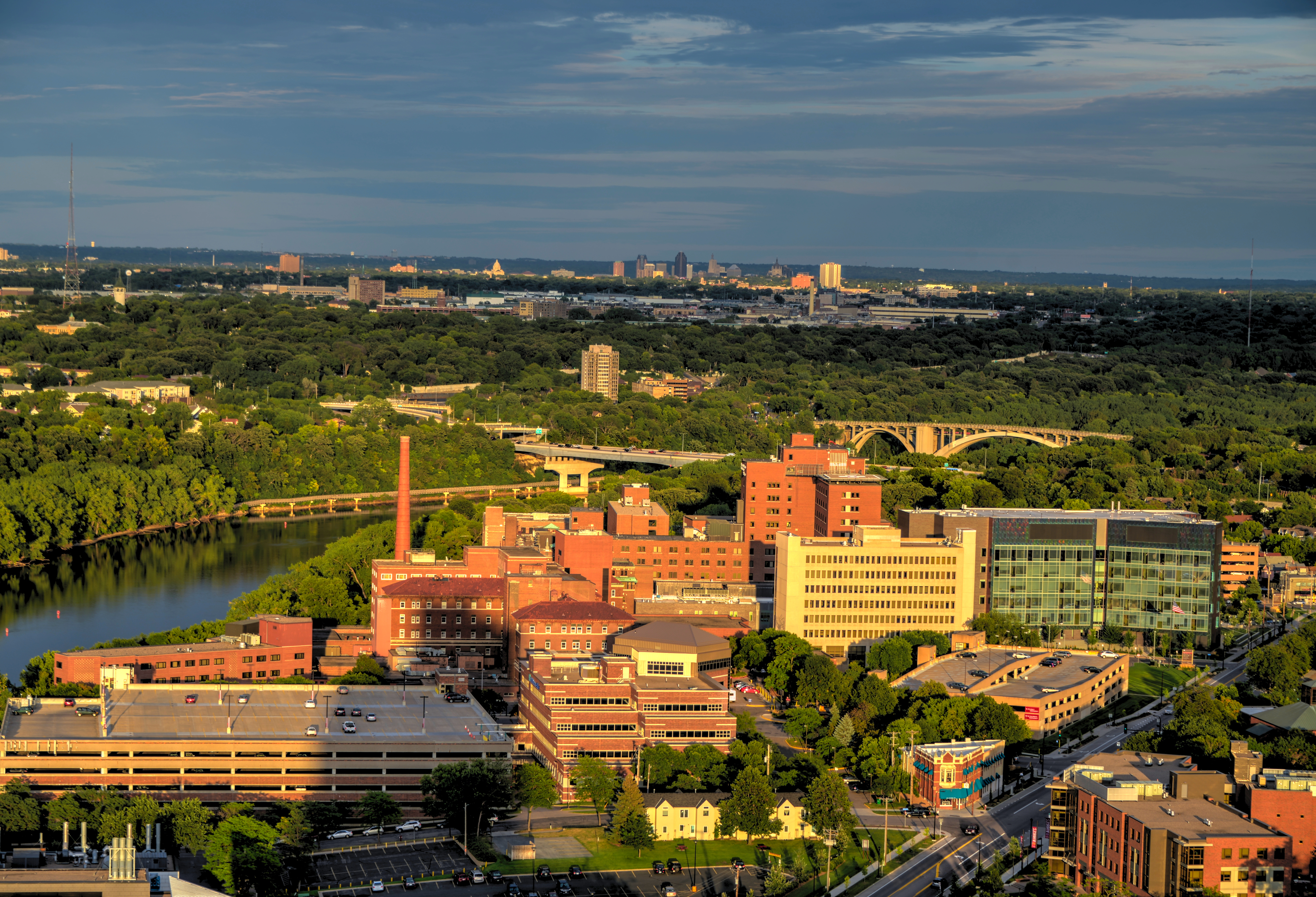
The University of Minnesota Medical Center

The neighborhood's past still has an influence in the present. Some of the businesses in the area harken back to an earlier time, like the worker-controlled punk hangout, Hard Times Café and the now-closed North Country Food Co-Op. In fact, some of the businesses, specifically in the Seven Corners district, use the history to promote their own business, such as the "Legend of the Seven Switchmen."

Fairview Hospital and St. Mary's Hospital figured prominently in the neighborhood, located only a few blocks away. Fairview and St. Mary's, which merged in 1986, later merged with the University of Minnesota Hospitals, forming a major medical complex straddling the Mississippi River. The organization is now known as University of Minnesota Medical Center.

== Geography ==
Historical population
Census	Pop.	Note	%±
1980	6,728		—
1990	6,368		−5.4%
2000	7,545		18.5%
2010	8,094		7.3%
2020	9,000		11.2%

Cedar-Riverside is located in Minneapolis City Council Wards 2 and 6, represented by Robin Wonsley and Jamal Osman, respectively. It is also in state legislative district 60B.

The neighborhood is part of the University community, and is dominated by the West Bank campus of the University of Minnesota's Minneapolis campus, which includes the Law School, Carlson School of Management, Hubert H. Humphrey Institute of Public Affairs, and West Bank Arts Quarter. The East and West Bank of the U of M are connected by the Washington Avenue Bridge. The acquisition of a number of residential blocks by the University for expansion of the West Bank campus was controversial in the 1960s.

The neighborhood is also home to Augsburg University, a private liberal arts college.

It is served by the Blue and Green light rail lines. Two popular mixed-use bike/pedestrian paths, Hiawatha LRT Trail and Samatar Crossing, also connect the neighborhood to the downtown area and to neighborhoods further south.

== Demographics ==
In the late 19th century, Cedar-Riverside had a sizable Scandinavian immigrant community, most of whose members labored in the Mississippi River's lumber and milling industries. It later evolved into a hub for intellectuals, hippies, radical activists, actors, musicians and artists during the 1960s and 70s. In keeping with its tradition of ethnic and cultural diversity, the neighborhood is today home to the largest immigrant community in the Twin Cities. Somalis are now the predominant minority group in the area, resulting in the neighborhood being nicknamed "Little Mogadishu."

According to U.S. Census data from the 2017 to 2021 periods, about 51.7% of residents were female and 48.3% were male. Around 39% of residents were foreign-born, the vast majority being of East African extraction. Around 54% of the Cedar-Riverside population spoke a language other than English. According to the American Community Survey 5-year estimates (2016–2020), the top non-English languages spoken in the Cedar-Riverside neighborhood are Somali (spoken by 47.3% of the population), Oromo (5.5%), Arabic (4.3%), Amharic (2.1%) and Spanish (1.4%). 25% cannot speak English fluently. 32.4% of residents have less than a high school diploma. 41.4% of households do not own a car.

The neighborhood's overall population has risen at a moderate but steady rate, from 6,368 in 1990 to 9,000 in 2020.

Race/ethnicity
Race/ethnicity	2000		2010		2020	
Race/ethnicity	Number	%	Number	%	Number	%
White alone	3,068	40.66	3,006	37.14	2,526	28.11
Black alone	2,409	31.93	3,645	45.03	4,826	53.70
Hispanic or Latino (any race)	426	5.65	277	3.42	413	4.60
Native American alone	59	0.78	41	0.51	54	0.60
Asian alone	1,176	15.59	882	10.90	860	9.57
Other race alone	17	0.23	14	0.17	34	0.38
Pacific Islander alone	7	0.09	2	0.02	0	0.00
Two or more races	382	5.06	227	2.80	274	3.05
Total	7,545	100.0	8,094	100.0	8,987	100.0

== Culture ==
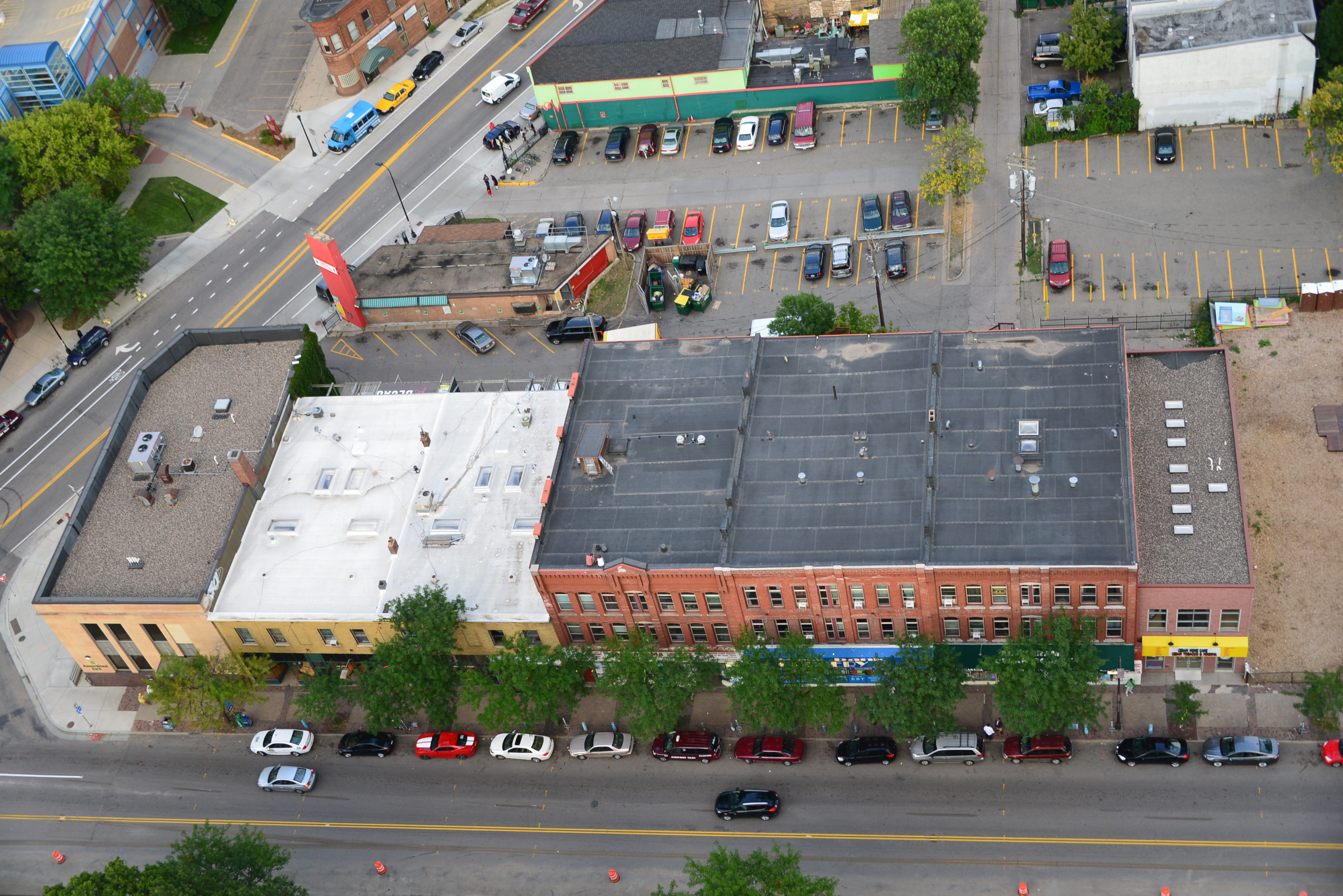
Original buildings on the east side of Cedar Avenue; the vacant site of Dania Hall (right)

Cedar-Riverside is one of the most diverse areas in Minneapolis and the Twin Cities metropolitan area. It is home to a number of the 100 or so different languages that are spoken in the Twin Cities. A vibrant neighborhood, it boasts many restaurants, cafés, bars, and venues for performance art and music.

The Cedar-Riverside neighborhood is historically known for its immigrant population, beginning in the late 1940s post-World War II with immigrants from eastern Europe. With the arrival of many new Cambodian, Somali, and especially Latino immigrants, hospitals now also offer services in other languages to accommodate patients whose mother tongue is not English. Employers such as Amazon have worked with the community to provide jobs and reduce the unemployment rate from 20 percent (in year 2017). Amazon hired 1,500 workers from the Cedar-Riverside job center and initially provided busing for workers to commute to its Shakopee distribution center but cut this service in late 2017.

=== Venues in Cedar-Riverside ===
Cedar-Riverside, with the locally infamous Seven Corners district, moldered into a skid row scene in the 1950s. In the mid-to-late 1960s, the University of Minnesota expanded across the Mississippi River into the Cedar-Riverside area, which was on the river's west bank. The area became known as the "West Bank" and became the center of the University-oriented counterculture and antiwar movement. It was home to local hippies, protesters, and other anti-establishment groups between the 1960s and early 1970s. During those days, the neighborhood was known as the "Haight-Ashbury of the Midwest."

Among the organizations founded in Cedar-Riverside was Fight Repression of Erotic Expression (FREE), headed by Stephen Ihrig in 1969. Koreen Phelps, another cofounder, was inspired by San Francisco's Society for Individual Rights. FREE members frequented Sutton Place, a local gay bar founded in 1965, although the bar remained apolitical. Sutton Place was frequently targeted by The Morals Squad, a force within the Minneapolis Police Department (MPD) throughout the 1960s. The Morals Squad would raid Sutton Place in order to regulate the bodies and social interactions of LGBTQ customers.

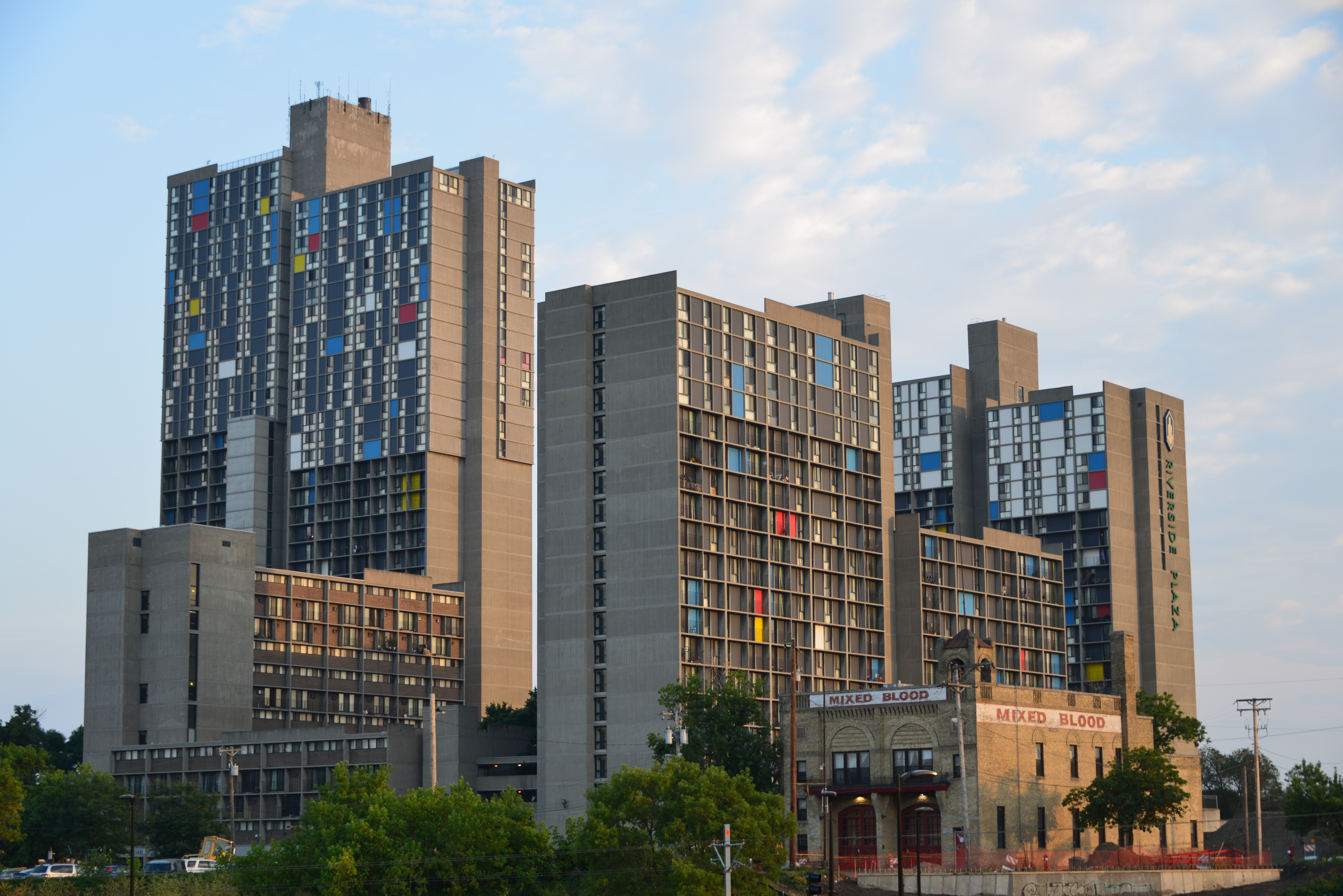
Riverside Plaza and the Mixed Blood Theatre at sunset

The West Bank was home to McCosh's secondhand book store, a center for Beat and Hippie left-leaning bookworms, and later Things, probably the first head shop in the Twin Cities, which sold counterculture curios, anti-Vietnam War buttons and posters, incense and drug paraphernalia. Marijuana, hashish and LSD were readily available in the area after about 1967. A community of hippies — and numerous students and hangers-on who emulated the hippie lifestyle (at least on weekends) — lived in old rental houses in the area and congregated at coffeehouses, such as the Extemporé, The Scholar and the Broken Drum, and at bars, such as the Triangle Bar, the Viking, Caesar's, The Mixers and the Music Bar. (The latter burned down the night Robert Kennedy was assassinated, and eventually was replaced by a "people's park"). The Triangle often featured performers and recording artists Dave Ray, Tony Glover and John Koerner, who had associated to some degree with Bob Dylan during his brief Minneapolis sojourn.

=== Coffeehouse Extemporé ===
Coffeehouse Extempore was at one time the nation’s oldest continuously operated folk music and arts center. It operated from the mid-1960s until it was permanently closed in 1987. It was originally founded on the model of 17th- and 18th-century English coffeehouses. Its programming was "aimed at promoting understanding and tolerance in the West Bank community.” As such, the Coffeehouse Extempore was unusual among the Cedar-Riverside venues in that it was non-alcoholic: it had tables for chatting over coffee, dedicated discussion rooms, and chess tables. The Café Extempore was a hub for a wide variety of people, including musicians, poets, chess players, LGBTQ+ individuals, runaways, academics, and both religious and non-religious people. It was a welcoming place where anyone and everyone was accepted, and people from all walks of life talked freely with one another. The Extempore provided an escape from stresses of poverty and it was a non-alcoholic, music-filled haven where patrons could enjoy low-cost concerts in the gallery, and a sense of safety and fun was pervasive. The venue's unpaved, potholed back lot even offered free parking. Inside, chess and other board games might be in play, and it was safe for adolescents.

But music was its great attraction, especially for local artists. In the first years, it was the venue where up-and-coming musicians such as Dakota Dave Hull and Sean Blackburn frequently performed. In the 1980s and until 1987 when it closed, hundreds of musicians had performed at the Coffeehouse Extempore in those years alone. The list included Ramblin' Jack Elliot, Don Williams, Peggy Seeger, Walkin' Jim Stoltz and Mike Seeger.

The Coffee Extempore financially struggled throughout its existence. It tried various endeavors to increase income: charging admission to its music venue, a juice bar, displaying local art, country store, and a snack/coffee bar. Throughout its existence grants and donations were an important part of its income. It received funds from General Mills, Pillsbury, Honeywell, Norwest Bank, and foundations: Bigelow, Cargill, Dayton Hudson (Target) and Archibald G. Bush which is associated with 3M.

=== Arts culture ===
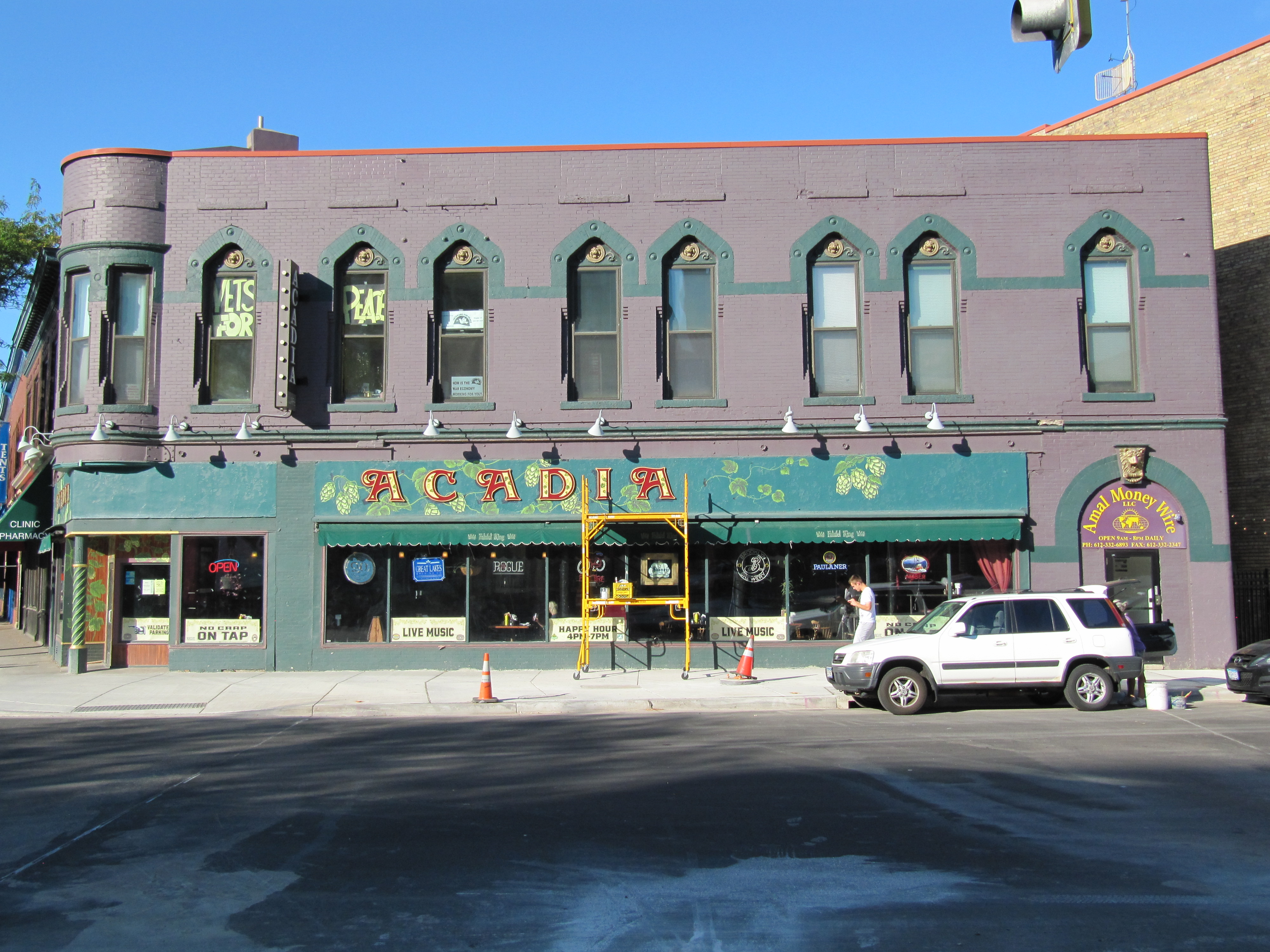
Acadia Cafe 2012

Cedar-Riverside is home to a thriving arts culture. There are many playhouses and theatre groups in the area, including the Mixed Blood Theatre Company, Theatre in the Round, and The Southern Theater. There is also a well-established music scene, with musicians frequenting venues like Acadia Cafe, The Cabooze, The Cedar Cultural Center, Palmer's BarPart Wolf MPLS, and The Red Sea.

Additionally, the West Bank music scene is known as a catalyst for major musicians, such as Bonnie Raitt, Leo Kottke, Butch Thompson (Jazz Originals), Peter Ostroushko (Prairie Home Companion), Dave "Snaker" Ray (Koerner, Ray & Glover), Erik Anderson (The Wallets), Dakota Dave Hull, Sean Blackburn (Prairie Home Companion), Bill Hinkley (Minnesota Music Hall of Fame), Karen Mueller (Autoharp Hall of Fame), and, to a lesser extent, Bob Dylan.

Many of these musicians also taught, performed and/or jammed at the West Bank School of Music. The Cedar Cultural Center, Extempore' Coffeehouse, Scholar Coffeehouse, New Riverside Cafe, Viking Bar, 400 Bar, 7 Corners, Whisky Junction, and Cedarfest have likewise all been popular music venues in their time.

Established in 1978, KFAI Fresh Air Community Radio is a community-powered station broadcasting 24/7/365 to the Twin Cities metro area at 90.3 FM, from the Bailey Building since 1991. Known for its bold and eclectic programming, KFAI airs 86 weekly shows in ten languages—84 of which are produced in-house—featuring local news, public affairs, and an adventurous range of music spanning folk traditions to the avant-garde. Dedicated to amplifying community voices, KFAI’s programming reflects and serves the diverse communities of the Twin Cities and beyond.

The arts flavor of the area is enhanced by the presence of Augsburg University and the University of Minnesota's West Bank Arts Quarter, which is home to the University’s arts programs.

Cedar Riverside also plays host to the annual Zombie Pub Crawl. In the 2005 the Minneapolis Zombie Pub Crawl began with about 100 participants. In 2011 Cedar Riverside hosted approximately 18,000 individuals for the seventh annual zombie pub crawl.

== Notable establishments ==
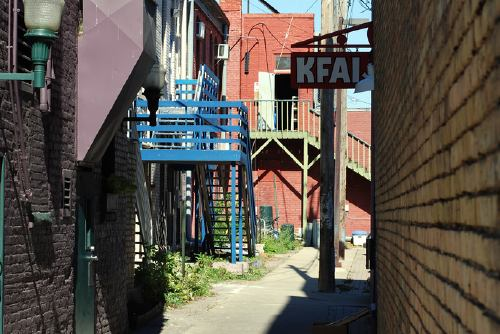
Alleyway entrance to KFAI

- The Cedar Cultural Center, "The World's Music, Here"
- The Electric Fetus record shop was located at 521 Cedar Avenue from 1968 to 1969 and at 514 Cedar Avenue from 1969 to 1972.
- Hard Times Café, cooperatively owned vegetarian restaurant
- KFAI, "Noncommercial community-powered radio"
- Mayday Books, "Not Making a Profit Since 1975"
- Mixed Blood Theatre Company, "Predictably Unpredictable"
- The People's Center "Care when you need it, not just when you can afford it."
- Radio K, "Real College Radio"
- Riverside Plaza
- The Southern Theater

== Crime ==
Crime statistics released by the Minneapolis Police Department for all of its neighborhoods indicate that between January and May 2012, Cedar Riverside had 134 instances of crime, mainly consisting of various forms of theft. Only one homicide was reported over this period. The neighborhood's statistics were comparable to the citywide average, and were a fraction of those of the neighborhood with the highest reported number of incidents, Downtown West.

Overall, according to police, crime peaked in the period between 2002 and 2006, and has steadily declined in the following 5 years. By 2011, instances of serious crime had dropped a reported 40%.

== See also ==
- Cedar-Riverside (Metro Transit station), light rail station on the METRO Blue Line
- West Bank (Metro Transit station), light rail station on the METRO Green Line
- Carl G. O. Hansen
