= Electric Fetus =

Record store in Minneapolis, Minnesota

Coordinates: 44°57′44.5″N 93°16′13.5″W

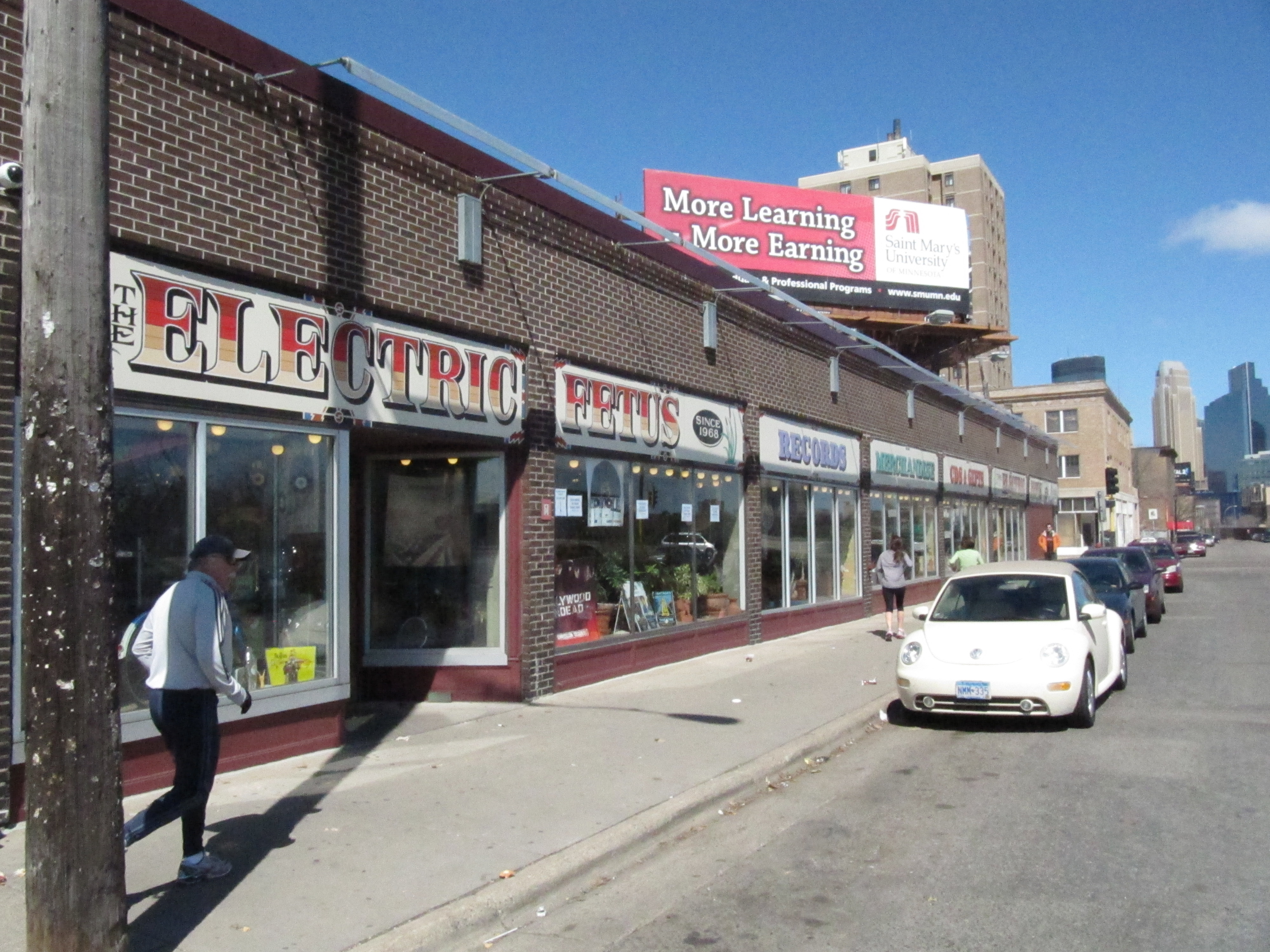
Electric Fetus Minneapolis storefront

The Electric Fetus is a record store in Minneapolis, Minnesota. Minnesota Public Radio said the Electric Fetus is "widely regarded as the pre-eminent indie record store in Minnesota." Owner Keith Covart estimates that the store has an inventory of approximately 50,000 titles.

== History ==
The store was founded in June 1968 by partners Dan Foley and Ron Korsh. Several months after opening Korsh sold his half of the enterprise to Keith Covart, who also obtained Foley's half about ten years later. Operations began in 1968 when Korsh rented a storefront in the Cedar-Riverside neighborhood, known at that time as the Haight-Ashbury of Minneapolis. In 1972 the business moved to its present location on the corner of 4th Avenue and Franklin. Electric Fetus previously had two locations in St. Cloud and Duluth, which closed permanently in 2014 and 2020 respectively. A definitive history of the store was written in 2006 by Penny Peterson and Charlene Roise: "A History of the Electric Fetus" as prepared for the Greater Twin Cities Blues Music Society.

The Electric Fetus Onestop is the wholesale distribution portion of the Electric Fetus. It has "a huge emphasis on local music and aims to provide an outlet for local musicians / bands to consign their CDs or records to be available for distribution through the One Stop. The One Stop's primary focus is local indie record stores and secondly national Independent Record Stores." The Electric Fetus Onestop is located in the basement of The Electric Fetus in Minneapolis and is not open to the public.

Musician Prince was a long-time customer of the store, and made purchases there for Record Store Day five days before his death in 2016.

== Trivia ==
- National Lampoon, among others, singled out the Electric Fetus as the worst name for a business.
- Bazaar magazine called the Electric Fetus one of the "best places in America to shop."^{[2]}
- Ringo Starr appears to have worn an Electric Fetus print shirt concealed beneath his jacket to the 2010 Grammy Awards.
- The Minneapolis Electric Fetus incurred trivial damage from an EF0 tornado on August 19, 2009.
