= Minnesota Food Cooperative Wars =

Feud between food cooperatives in the Twin Cities

The Minnesota Food Cooperative Wars took place in 1975-1976 and revolved around the many food cooperatives in the Twin Cities region of Minnesota. Initially, the disputes and confrontations within the Twin Cities Cooperative movement were not referred to as "Wars", but the nomenclature developed in part as a result of the title of a documentary made decades later.

Despite the usage of the term "coop", most Twin Cities coops were not organized as consumer or producer cooperatives. Some were worker collectives and others were non-profit organizations. The local counter-culture food cooperative movement was started in 1970 by The People's Pantry, an establishment in the Cedar-Riverside People's Center that aimed to provide bulk-supplied "natural" foods to the surrounding community at wholesale prices. Coop Organization or CO expanded because their focus on centralized distribution and revolutionary political organizing appealed to leftist co-op workers who were frustrated with the marijuana smoking and casual attitude of their fellow counter-culture co-op workers. In 1975, polarization amongst different types of co-operatives led to vigorous competition, violent altercations, and the territorial seizure of some co-ops. The conflict began to fade out for various reasons during the summer of the following year.

== Initial goals of cooperatives ==
Many of the early counter-culture co-operatives had hopes of being able to offer a natural and inexpensive alternative to the grocery industry in a community-centered farmers' market economy. The members of various cooperatives also hoped to have the ability to feed most, if not all, of the Twin Cities region with their collective resources. Most co-ops maintained communication with others through the Public Review Board that worked through one of the biggest co-ops, the People's Warehouse in Minneapolis.

== Reasons for polarization ==
In the early 1970s, most co-operatives stood by the initial goals of the cooperative movement, but as time went by, an ideological split emerged between those of the traditional decentralized and organic-focused co-ops and those in favor of revolutionary change. This faction believed that these food cooperatives should not only serve the working class community, but that the food coops should be a force to unite the working class against the capitalist class. They emphasized that the cooperatives in their early working form were too decentralized and disunited. They also pushed for cheaper items of produce to be sold, such as margarine, white bread, and other items with some processed ingredients as to make the cooperatives more affordable and increase the range of their shopper demographic. They worked in the Beanery Coop on Lyndale Avenue in Minneapolis. They invited the neighborhood to participate in food selection. They published a manifesto explaining their criticisms of the existing co-op movement. This side eventually became known as the Coop Organization or the CO. Their model of organizing was heavily influenced by James Forman and groups such as the Student Nonviolent Coordinating Committee.

== Beginning of wars ==
In early 1975, the CO published a series of papers that described their analysis of the Food Coop Movement. There was a history published that placed the co-op movement in the context of the post-WWII civil rights movement. A paper criticizing what it said was the food co-op movement's attitude towards profit and its effect on the growth and sustainability of the co-ops. The CO proposed that the Peoples Warehouse be managed by a "Workers Administration Committee" and that other committees (Farm, Purchasing, Production, Distribution and Food) be created to do the work and incorporate local and midwest coop stores in decision making.

The dispute among the various members of the coop and worker-owned broke into the open in early May, 1975 when the CO members attended a quarterly meeting of the Policy Review Board, an intermediary organization made up of various representatives from different food stores, hosted at the Odd Fellows Hall above the Green Grass Grocery, a Saint Paul Coop. At this meeting the CO laid out a radical, farmer and worker controlled, centralized structure to replace the Policy Review Board. The Policy Review Board refused this proposal.

On May 5, 1975, 25 members of the CO, which included most of the People's Warehouse workers, and led by three women from Selby Coop in Saint Paul, entered the People's Warehouse using keys and retook it from a group that had occupied it earlier that night. The earlier occupiers had smoked marijuana and when they saw that CO members had wooden poles and metal pipes as weapons they left as soon as they could. There were no significant injuries inflicted, but the displaced occupiers felt violently intimidated. The event was made even more controversial when the notably-anarchist Policy Review Board contacted the police and tried to sue the CO over building ownership. Some surrounding food cooperatives were in favor of this change and continued to do business and align with the CO's main objectives while others boycotted and found other ways in which to transport and sell their product. Following the takeover of the People's Warehouse, the CO attempted to occupy the nearby North Country food co-operative as well, but the attempt fell through due to the leaking of the plan beforehand by a CO defector. This led to the police arriving at the scene at the time of the attempt, and the would-be occupiers were quickly dispersed.

In early January 1976, the CO furthered their agenda by attacking the Bryant-Central Cooperative. While no one took responsibility for it, it was widely suspected that someone from the CO firebombed a coordinator's truck. They also briefly occupied and physically removed the workers of the Seward Cooperative on January 9 of that year. Alongside with these attacks, the CO maintained control in other co-ops where their members were the majority. In response to these incidents, food co-operatives in the area began incorporating to ensure their property ownership could be verified by the police during occupations.

The CO also launched a march of between 50 and 100 people against the Mill City Food Cooperative with intentions of taking over their business. The Mill City Food Cooperative met this march with approximately 200 of their own people who blockaded the storefront and were able to maintain the CO marchers from entering.

== Ending of wars ==
In 1976, a mob of North Country Cooperative's members, expelled its majority-CO board members for attempting to lift the co-operative's embargo on the still CO-controlled People's Warehouse. After this event, at the nearby CO-controlled Powderhorn Food Community, a non-profit food store with an elected board, non-CO co-op members broke into Powderhorn Food Community, changed the locks, and installed a new cash register, and used it to buy as much of the store's products as possible, thereby draining the bank account. In the summer of 1976, the biggest food cooperative, People's Warehouse was restored back to its original order with the Policy Review Board regaining full control through winning a significant court action. Following this loss, the CO still maintained power in some cooperatives, but made no further attempts to expand their revolutionary efforts by taking over new co-operatives. By the early 1980s, Minnesota's food cooperative scene had begun to recede.

== Effects ==
People who were not as involved, such as the everyday citizens of Minneapolis and the surrounding areas, were scared away, and the wars have negatively stigmatized food co-operatives for some older twin-cities residents. The damage done by the wars, in public image, drove many cooperative members to trend away from taking part in political activity in the region. Many former CO members now see the organization as having been a cult. Neither side in the co-op wars were able to realize their vision of a revolutionary co-op fed working class, or a natural food based massive distribution network. Despite the difficulties faced by the movement, Minnesota still has more food cooperatives than almost any other state in the United States.
