= Hard Times Cafe =

Restaurant in Minneapolis, Minnesota, U.S.

Coordinates: 44°58′10.5″N 93°14′46″W

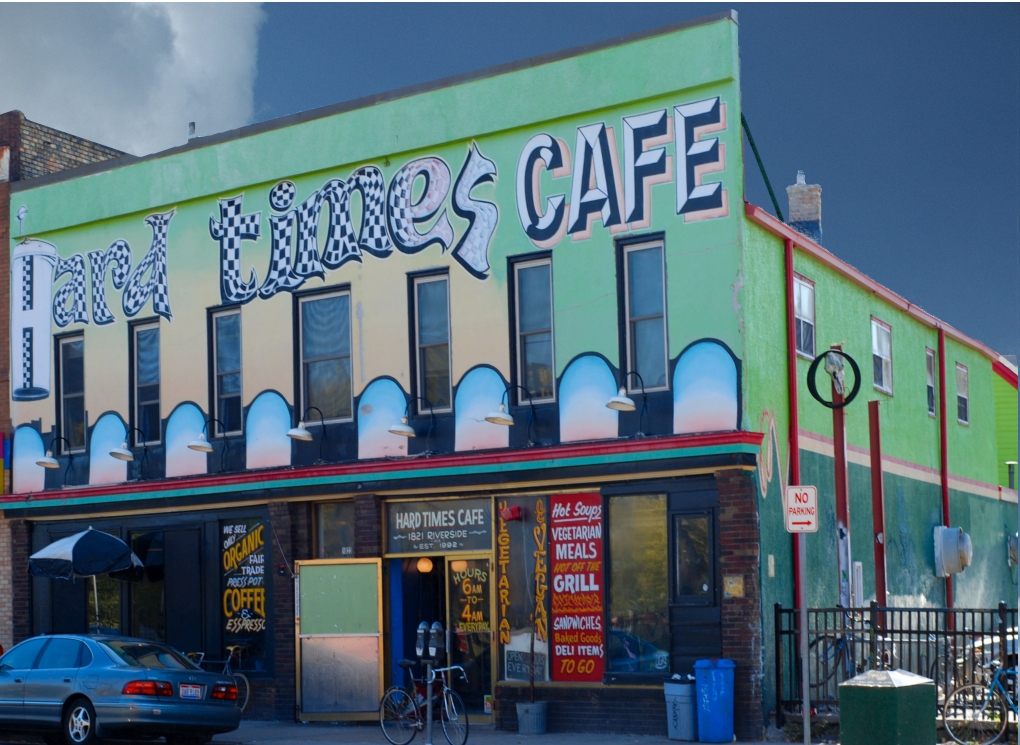
- Hard Times Cafe on Riverside Avenue
- Interactive map of Hard Times Cafe

Restaurant information
- Established: 1992
- Owner: Collectively owned
- Food type: Vegan, vegetarian
- Location: 1821 Riverside Ave, Minneapolis, Minnesota, 55454

Hard Times Cafe is a collectively owned restaurant in the Cedar-Riverside neighborhood of Minneapolis, Minnesota. It is known for its punk and hippie ideology, its gritty ambiance, and its large selection of vegan and vegetarian food. It is open from 8 a.m. to midnight every day.

== History ==
Hard Times was founded as a 24-hour cafe in 1992 by eight employees of The Cafe Expatriate, a failing restaurant at that location. Working with the vision of a place where all kinds of people could come together to drink coffee and eat vegetarian food, they transformed the restaurant into what is now Hard Times. The location is a staple of the West Bank neighborhood, and a popular gathering place for local artists, musicians, students, and political activists.

Minneapolis Second Ward City Council Member Cam Gordon formerly held open office hours in the cafe on the first Tuesday morning of each month.

Hard Times faced closing in January 2000, when several arrests were made as a result of a drug sting at the cafe. The owners closed the doors voluntarily in the aftermath, but faced problems with the city when attempting to reopen. The owners met all of the health and fire codes necessary to reopen, but refused to sign a contract obligating them to close at 2 a.m. and hire a licensed security guard. A compromise was eventually made, with Hard Times closing its doors for two hours each night.

Hard Times closed for remodeling in August 2007, after a recommendation from a health inspector that they update their ventilation system. The original expectation was that the restaurant would be closed for a matter of weeks, but delays in shipping, unforeseen circumstances, and additional recommendations by the city kept the doors closed for three months beyond the intended opening date. The cafe received financial assistance from Seward Community Cafe, a fellow Minneapolis worker cooperative. The cafe reopened at midnight December 16, 2007, with a new ventilation system and other recommended improvements.

== See also ==
- List of vegetarian and vegan restaurants
