= Brian Coyle =

American politician (1944–1991)

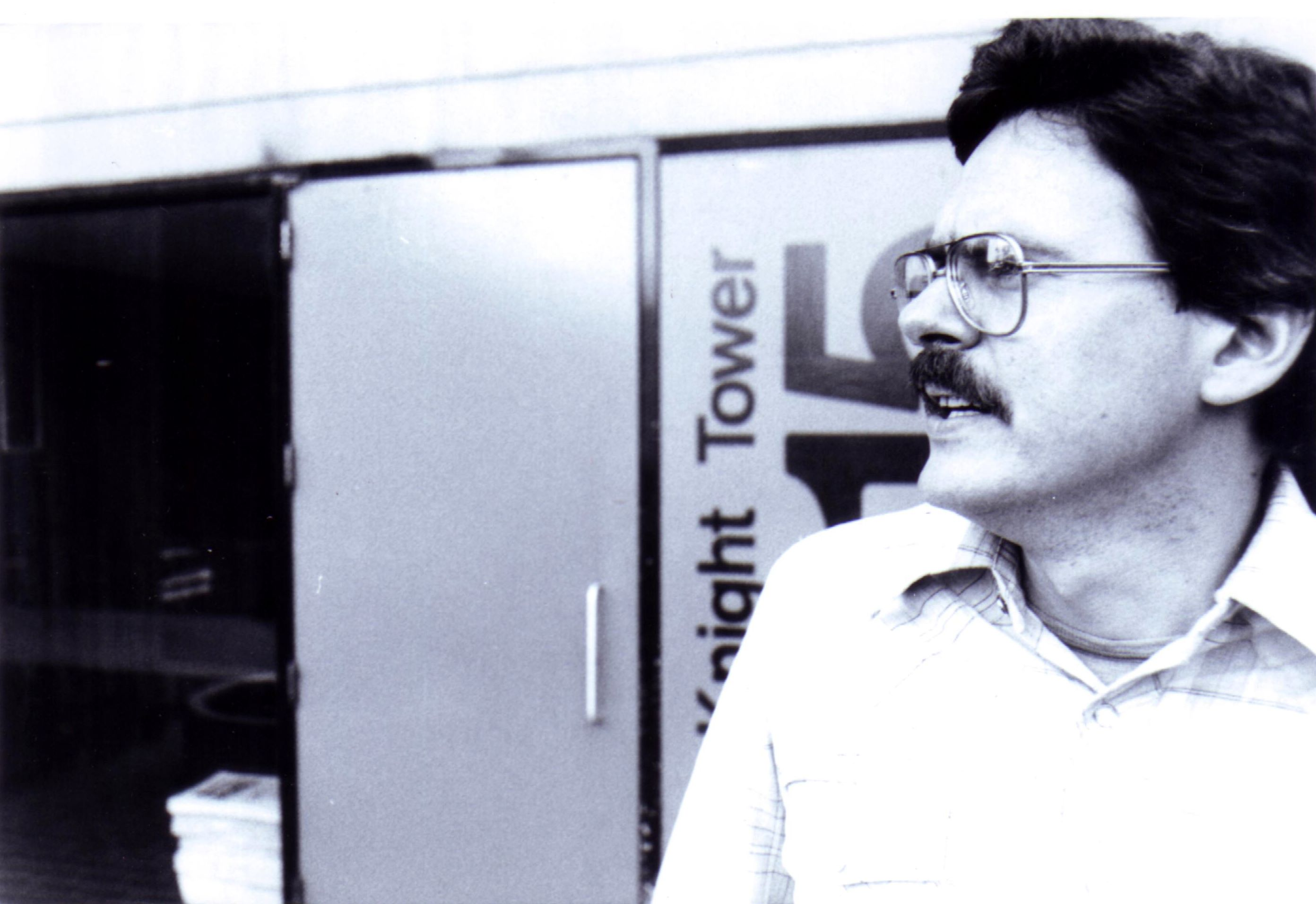
Brian Coyle, photographed in 1978.

Brian John Coyle (June 25, 1944 – August 23, 1991) was an American community leader, elected official, and gay activist. Coyle was one of the founders of the alternative newspaper Hundred Flowers. He later became the first openly gay member of the Minneapolis City Council.

== Biography ==
Brian John Coyle was born on June 25, 1944, in Great Falls, Montana. He was raised in Moorhead, Minnesota, and graduated from Moorhead High School. He received his BA degree from the University of Minnesota (Minneapolis campus) in 1967. While at the university, Coyle was a member of Students for a Democratic Society and a writer for the Minnesota Daily. He organized the first Vietnam 'teach-in' at the university, and originated the Free University.

After graduating from the university, Coyle taught humanities at Moorhead State University for one year, where he was indicted for failure to register for the draft, but was acquitted as a conscientious objector. He returned to Minneapolis in 1968, worked at the Twin Cities Draft Information Center, and was one of the founders of the alternative newspaper Hundred Flowers. He worked as national office coordinator for the New American Movement and directed the National Campaign to Impeach Nixon, and founded the Progressive Roundtable. During this time (1971), he publicly came out as gay.

=== 1970s and later ===
Locally, Coyle spent much time in the mid-to-late-1970s working on tenants' rights issues, and campaigning (unsuccessfully) for a rent control ordinance. He was also active in powerline protests in rural Minnesota (along with future Minnesota Senator Paul Wellstone). From 1979 to 1981, Coyle organized with Minnesotans Against the Downtown Dome (MADD), a coalition opposed to the construction of a subsidized sports stadium in downtown Minneapolis.

In 1978, Coyle ran as an independent candidate for US Senator, in a special election to complete the term of Hubert Humphrey (losing to David Durenberger). In 1979, he ran for Mayor of Minneapolis (losing to DFL'er Don Fraser). He ran for the Minneapolis City Council (Ward 6) in 1981, but lost to incumbent Jackie Slater in a close race. In 1983, in a newly drawn sixth ward centered on the neighborhoods of Whittier, the Wedge, Cedar-Riverside, and parts of downtown, he won election to the City Council, where he concentrated on affordable housing, human rights, economic development, the environment and transportation. Coyle also fought for light rail transportation and domestic partner benefits. He served as council vice president. He was one of 13 openly gay elected officials at the International Network of Lesbian and Gay Officials (INLGO) Conference in 1985.

Coyle served three terms on the City Council. He was diagnosed as HIV-positive in 1986, but this was not known publicly until 1991, the same year that he died from AIDS-related complications, aged 47. Ford House is a memorial to Coyle. A Minneapolis community center, a neighborhood garden and a Human Rights Campaign leadership award also carry his name. On October 13, 1996, a commissioned bust of Coyle, created by artist Deborah Richert, was unveiled in the rotunda of Minneapolis' City Hall.

== Legacy ==
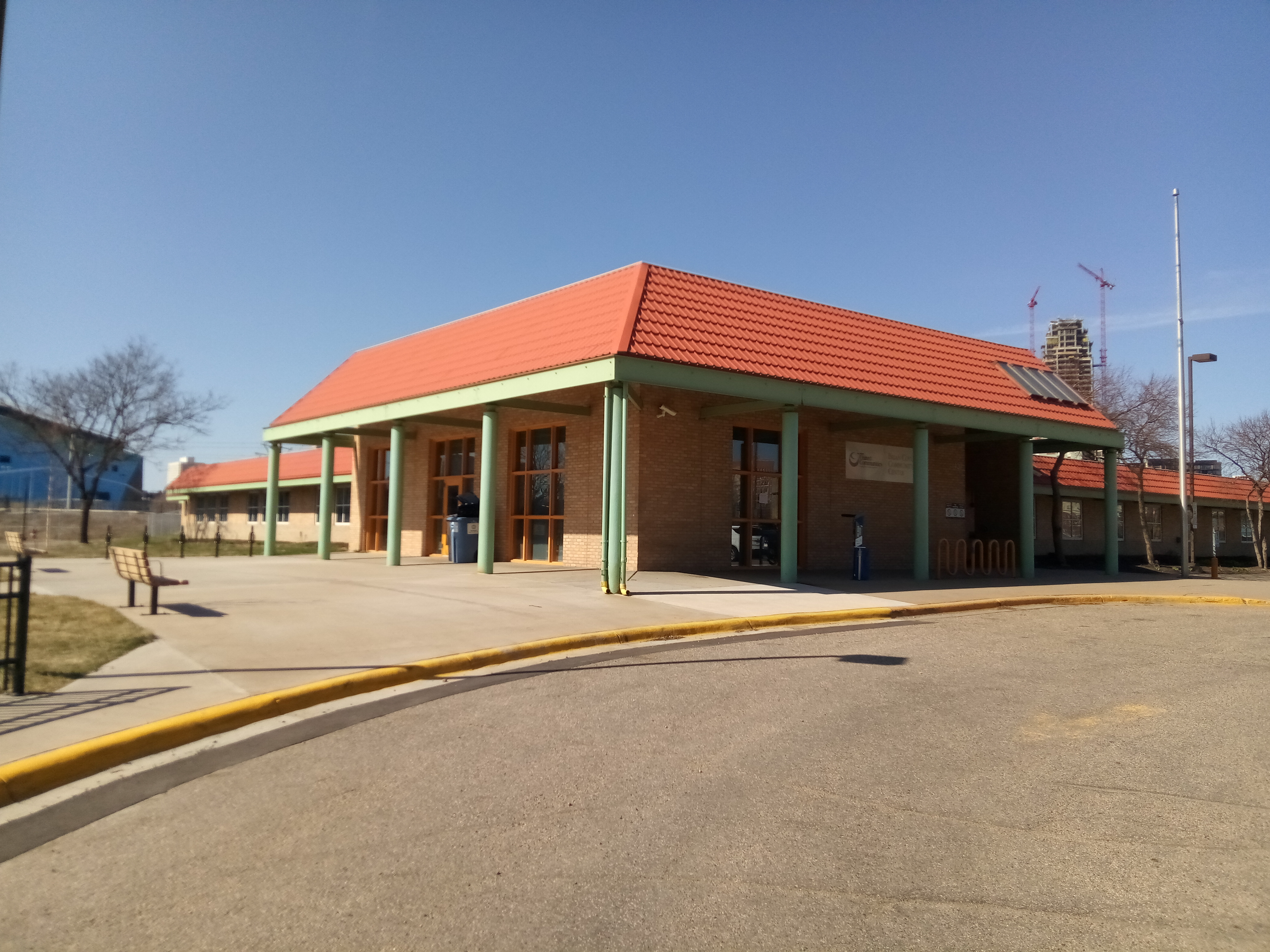
Brian Coyle Community Center

Coyle has been credited for laying the foundation for LGBTQ politics in Minnesota, including the state's legalization of same-sex marriage. He is the namesake of the Brian Coyle Community Center in the Cedar Riverside neighborhood and Brian Coyle Community Garden in Elliot Park.
