= Hundred Flowers (newspaper) =

Underground publication of 1970s Minnesota

- Cover of vol. 1, no. 5 (May 15, 1970)
- Type: Underground press weekly
- Format: Tabloid
- Owner: Collective
- Publisher: collective
- Editor: collective
- Founded: April 17, 1970; 56 years ago
- Ceased publication: April 4, 1972; 54 years ago
- Headquarters: Minneapolis, Minnesota
- Circulation: 5,000
- Price: $0.25
- OCLC number: 1752409

Hundred Flowers was an American underground newspaper published in Minneapolis, Minnesota from April 17, 1970 to April 4, 1972. It was produced by a communal collective, with the main instigator being antiwar activist and former Smith College drama instructor Ed Felien. The 16-page, two-color tabloid was published weekly (later biweekly) and cost 25 cents, circulating about 5,000 copies.

== History ==
Interview with Warren Hanson regarding Hundred Flowers.

Hundred Flowers was a blend of antiwar radical activism and civil rights with hippie counterculture, with special issues devoted to the Women's Liberation and Gay Liberation movements and to the Black Panther Party. Founders, members of the staff collective, and contributors included SDS/gay activist Brian J. Coyle (who later became Minneapolis' first openly gay city council person), Warren Hanson (who later founded the Greater Minnesota Housing Fund and co-founded Fresh Air Community Radio aka KFAI-FM and Community Reinvestment Fund USA), Tom Utne (graphic artist & brother of Eric Utne, publisher of the Utne Reader), Richard Dworkin, Marly Rusoff (who later founded The Loft Literary Center), Ralph Wittcoff (a co-founder of the New Riverside Cafe), Rosemary Pierce, and many others. Ed Felien went on to serve on the Minneapolis City Council and to establish South Side Pride, a successful South side newspaper and news blog which ended publication in 2026.

For at least the first eight months of its existence the core group lived in a staff commune.

A financial breakdown published in an early issue reported that Hundred Flowers had to gross between four and five hundred dollars a week to break even, with about half the money coming from advertising and the other half coming from sales by casual street vendors, which were coordinated through three local head shops serving as distribution points. Half the money went to pay for printing, and the other half paid the rent, utilities, and food bills of the staff commune.

After its 19th issue Hundred Flowers could no longer find a printer with the necessary web-fed press anywhere within a 150-mile radius who was willing to print the paper due to the newspapers position on the Vietnam War, draft resistance, gay rights, abortion rights and other progressive issues, and the staff were forced to go to Port Washington, Wisconsin to get the paper printed by William Schanen ("by mid-1969, his was the only print shop between Iowa City and Kalamazoo willing to handle underground papers"), who was printing the Chicago Seed, Milwaukee Kaleidoscope and about half the underground papers in the Midwest. the paper was also later printed at the Red Wing Republican Eagle (a Libertarian press) in Red Wing, Minnesota, and the Pipestone County Star in Pipestone, Minnesota, for a few issues.

By its 30th issue published December 11, 1970, the collective parted ways with Ed Felien as a result of political statements published by Felien that were in conflict with principles held by other members of the newspaper collective. The publication moved to a different office and was relaunched as a biweekly from January 29, 1971 to May 1, 1971, and then again as a weekly from June 4, 1971 to Dec. 3, 1971 (vol. 2, no. 33). The paper continued to be published irregularly until April 4, 1972 by different staff who were not involved originally. Beginning in 1970, the paper was published from offices above Liberty House (operated by Marv Davidov, founder of the Honeywell Project) at the corner of 6th Street and Cedar Avenue in the "West Bank" neighborhood near the University of Minnesota campus. Liberty House also housed the People's Pantry food co-op, the catalyst for the "new wave" food co-op movement in Minnesota and the precursor to the North Country Food Co-op, the first new wave food co-op in Minnesota . Several of the original Hundred Flowers collective went on to co-found various Twin Cities "new wave" food co-ops throughout the 1970s and 1980s, including North Country Food Co-op, People's Company Bakery, the New Riverside Cafe, West Bank Co-op Grocery, West Bank Co-op Pharmacy, Mill City Food Co-op, People's Warehouse, as well as the Twin Cities Women's Union, Haymarket Press, and KFAI-FM aka Fresh Air Radio, among other community enterprises.

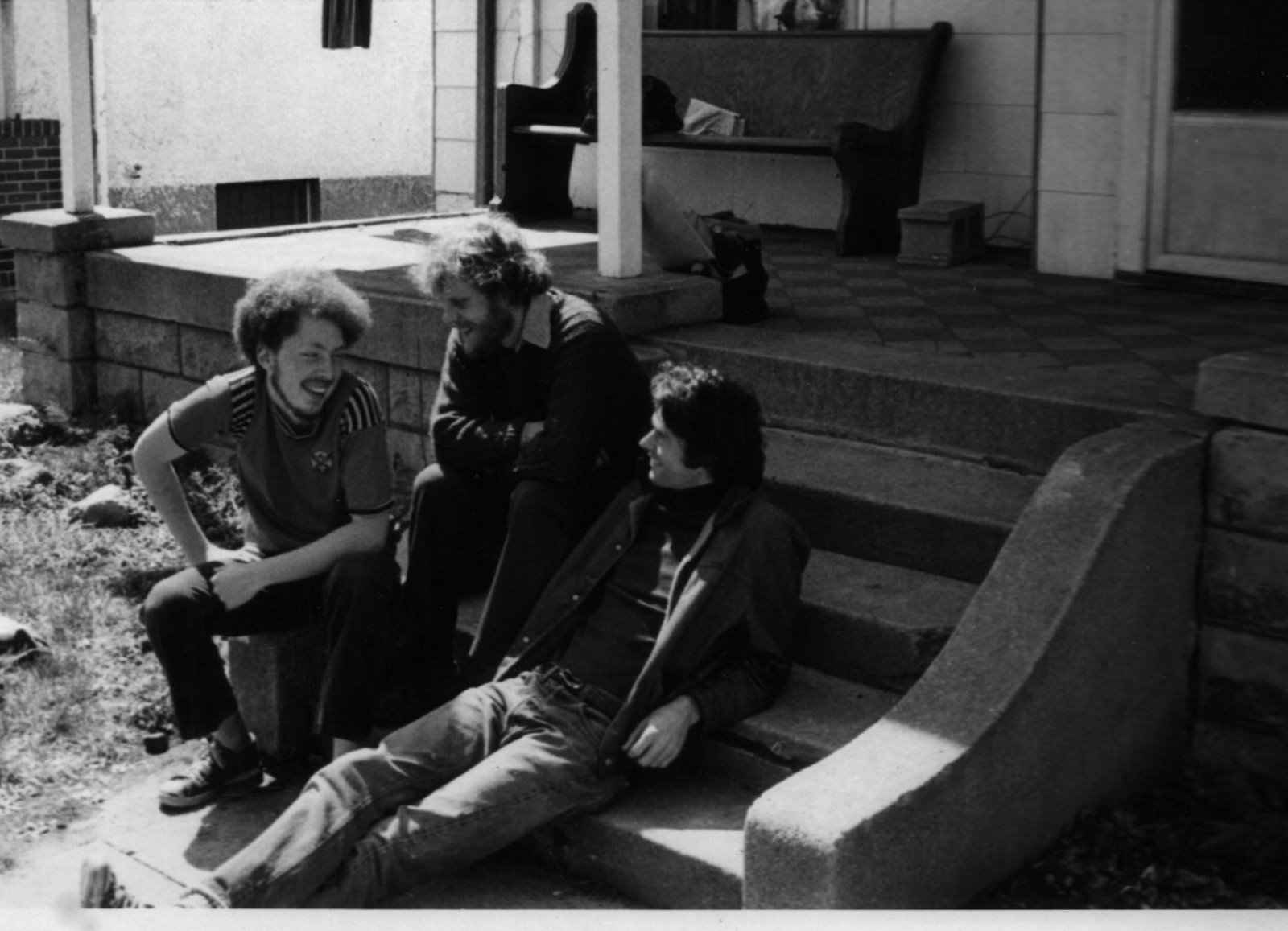
Richard Dworkin, Ed Felien, and Warren Hanson in front of the Hundred Flowers commune

== See also ==
- List of underground newspapers of the 1960s counterculture
