= The O (political group) =

American communist political group

The Co-Op Organization
- Abbreviation: The O, CO
- Founders: Theophilus Smith
- Founded: 1974; 52 years ago
- Dissolved: 1990s
- Ideology: Marxism-Leninism; Maoism; New Left
- Political position: Left-wing

The O (short for "the Organization", also known as the CO or Coop Organization) was an American radical political cadre organization in the Twin Cities that grew out of the New Left movement in the 1970s. It was established in 1974 by Theophilus Smith, a former staff member of the Student Nonviolent Coordinating Committee.

== History ==
=== Origins ===
In the late 1960s the Black-led civil rights movement shifted its focus from strictly legal and policy changes to developing a Black power movement that included a call for economic self-determination. There were numerous efforts: Fannie Lou Hamer led the creation of the Black Freedom Farm Cooperative. The Black Economic Development Conference in Detroit in 1969 published a manifesto written by James Forman calling for reparations to develop the Black community. It raised funds for a Detroit-based printing press and bookstore linked to the League of Revolutionary Black Workers. In Minneapolis, there was an effort to establish a food coop on the Northside's Plymouth avenue during the same time period.

In the early 1970s, white radicals and college-based anti-war activists in Minneapolis and Saint Paul had founded more than two dozen natural food cooperatives, which were owned and operated almost entirely by volunteer members. Former co-op members Craig Cox (author of Storefront Revolution: Food Co-ops and the Counter Culture) and David Gutknecht (founder and longtime editor of the magazine Cooperative Grocer) describe the growth of food co-ops as an attempt to enact ideals of mutual aid and other cooperative principles. Members of the hippie counter-culture and the anti-war movement in the Twin Cities were inspired by the desire to "feed the people" and perhaps by some knowledge of other food co-ops in the United States. Although the connections were mostly unexplored at the time, the food co-op movement can be traced in part back to both the Rochdale movement in England and the history of economic cooperation in the African American community (see Jessica Gordon Nembhard's book Collective Courage).

Political differences arose between those who were influenced by the ideas of the counter-culture and anarchism, and the New Left. The second group argued that the co-operatives should sell processed food products, white sugar, and canned goods that were familiar to working people. They argued that selling cheaper goods would make co-ops more accessible to the working class, and would allow them to better deliver a message of revolution to those they felt were most in need of it. A few of them who had previously worked in other food co-ops started working at a failing worker run co-op - the Beanery. They invited the neighborhood to participate They published a manifesto explaining their criticisms of the existing co-op movement.

By the mid-70s, some of those calling themselves communists had formed a group known as the Coop Organization, or C.O. The group had developed through secretive study groups. They argued that the "middle-class hippies" pushing for organic food in co-op stores did not understand the plight of the working class, and that the co-op community was too disorganized and dominated by middle-class elites to lead the sustained struggle against racism, capitalism, and imperialism that the C.O. felt was necessary. The group had members in many of the co-ops around town, and their membership was strongest at the People's Warehouse (a distributor servicing many of the cooperatively-run businesses in the Twin Cities) and at the Beanery.

=== The co-op struggles (1975-1976) ===
In Spring of 1975, the C.O. proposed a reorganization of the People's Warehouse with the core concept being that it be put under the control of a "Workers Administration Committee" made up of representatives from farmers, warehouse workers and the Co-op Stores. In May 1975, the C.O. attempted to negotiate control via a restructuring of the Coops at a board meeting. Later that night the C.O. took over the People's Warehouse from a small group that had occupied it earlier that day. This group did not include People's Warehouse workers and was attempting to represent the All Coop Assembly. The C.O. took control of the warehouse, its checkbook and financial records. Other co-op members attempted to negotiate with the C.O. and were met with violence. Warehouse occupier Phill Baker, who was part of the board meeting, described C.O. members threatening them with iron bars and sticks. One person was struck. The next morning the C.O. announced, "The People's Warehouse now belongs to the people!"

After this meeting there was a clear divide between the two sides. The C.O. used various tactics to take control of other co-ops, including further confrontation. On January 9, 1976, C.O. members entered the Seward Cooop (called this because the store was not yet legally defined as a co-op) and confronted worker-owners Kris Olsen and Leo Cashman, lifting them and carrying them out of the store. Such actions appalled many in the co-op community, who organized a boycott of C.O.-run businesses. A non-C.O. distribution warehouse was set up called DANCE. The C.O.'s leader Theophilus Smith criticized former Black Panther Mo Burton and used bullying tactics. This led Burton's supporters to physically retaliate. These events led to a decline of the C.O., as the People's Warehouse and other businesses reverted to non-C.O. control.

=== After the co-op struggles (late 1970s-1990s) ===
Though they had suffered a defeat in the control of the Peoples Warehouse, the C.O. persisted into the late '70s and early '80s. Now known simply as "The O," they became a highly secretive group of about 30 members (down from around 300 to 1000 in their heyday). Members were known by code names and organized in disconnected cells in order to throw off the FBI, and were expected to unquestioningly follow directives from elusive leader, Theophilus (Theo) Smith. These directives did not only concern political actions, but personal lives as well - former member Alexandra Stein, author of Inside Out: A Memoir of Entering and Breaking Out of a Minneapolis Political Cult has described being ordered to enter into a "P.R." (personal relationship) with one of her follow O members, with the aim of getting pregnant.

It is unknown whether remnants of the O still survive, due to its policy of near-total secrecy. Members were not allowed to talk to non-members, and were given very limited information about others in the organization. Stein mentions ten people in her social circle who left the O in 1991; presumably it still existed at that time.

== Characteristics ==
The group was characterized by an extreme form of secrecy. Members used code names, and instructions were communicated by memos. It was structured so that individuals did not share their work with other members, other than their Contact or people on their work teams. The secrecy was such that many members had never met, or could not even name, group leader Theophilus (Theo) Smith. Some members were under the impression that the group was related to an unnamed nationwide group. At one point members received no orders for a year, with no explanation given at the time or afterwards. During that year Smith was in the workhouse in Minnesota, serving time for manslaughter in the killing of a popular black DJ who had been living in one of the properties Smith owned in North Minneapolis.

Sociology professor and specialist on cults Janja Lalich stated that the O, "with its clandestine structure, charismatic leader and all-controlling environment", was a cult. However some former members have disagreed. Former member Bob Malles described being in the O as a "bizarre and painful experience". However he describes it not as a cult, but as a failed social experiment that "blew up in the lab, so to speak, flinging the research staff far and wide."

== See also ==
- Seward Community Cafe
