= Inline skates =

Boots with wheels arranged in a single line

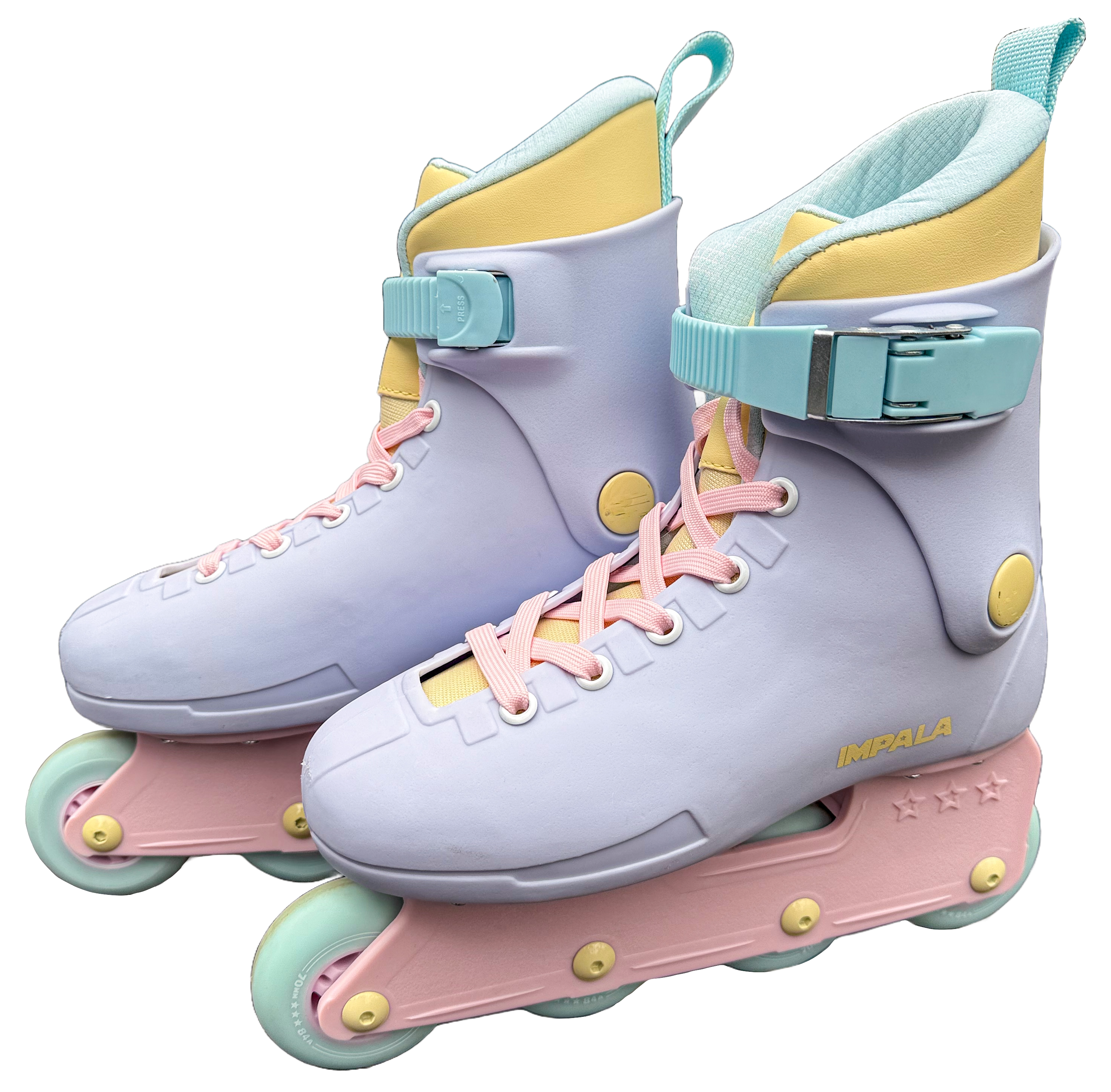
Recreational skates

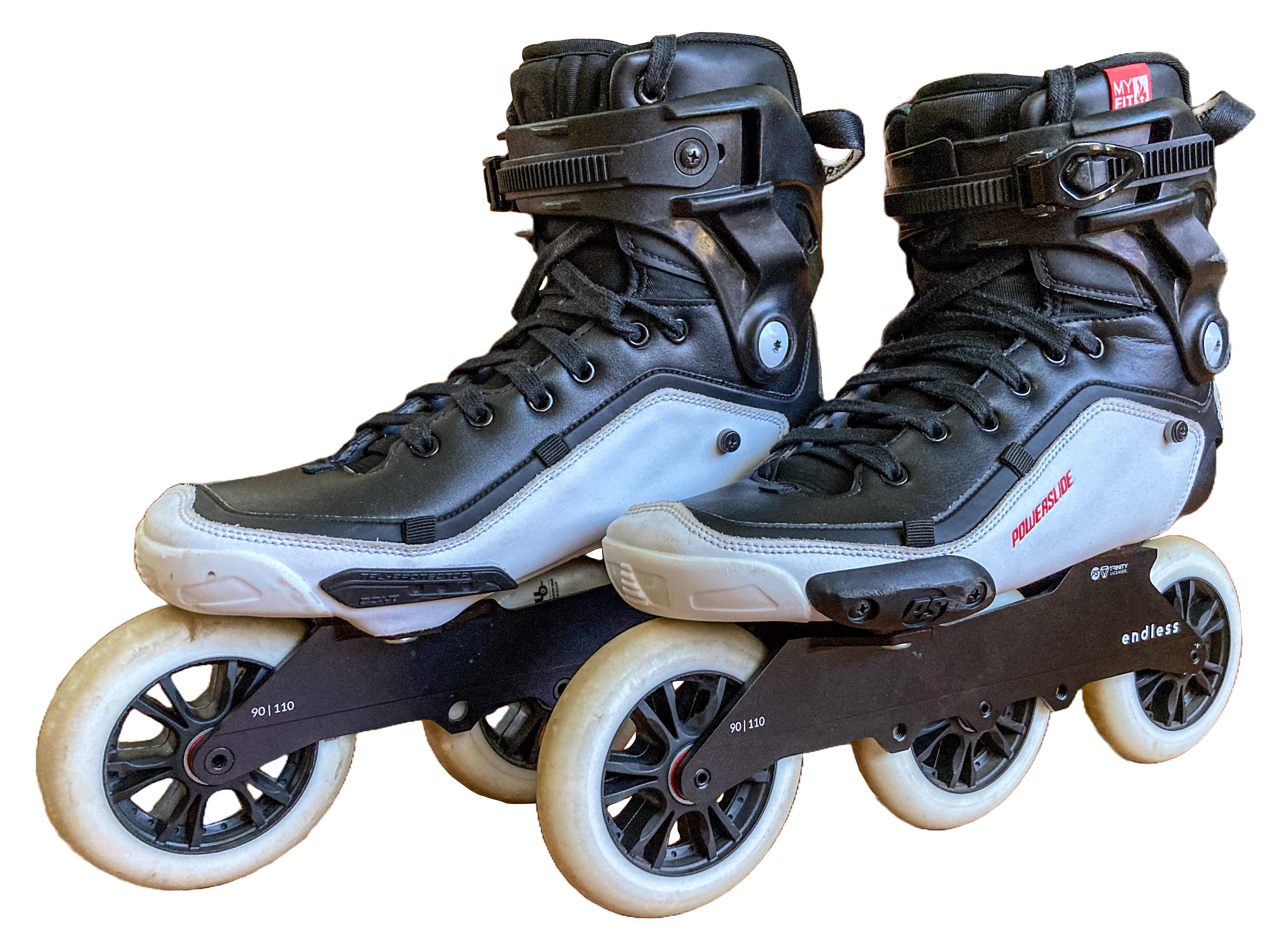
Urban skates

Inline skates are boots with wheels arranged in a single line from front to back, allowing one to move in an ice skate-like fashion. Inline skates are a type of roller skate. Inline skates became prominent in the late 1980s with the rise of Rollerblade, Inc., and peaked in the late 1990s. The registered trademark Rollerblade has since become a generic trademark: "rollerblading" is now a verb for skating with inline skates, or "rollerblades."

In the 21st century, inline skates come in many varieties, suitable for different types of inline skating activities and sports such as recreational skating, urban skating, roller hockey, street hockey, speed skating, slalom skating, aggressive skating, vert skating, and artistic inline skating. Inline skaters can be found at traditional roller rinks, street hockey rinks, skateparks, and on urban streets. In cities around the world, skaters organize urban group skates. Paris Friday Night Fever Skate (Randonnée du Vendredi Soir) is renowned for its large crowd size, as well as its iconic +10 mile urban routes. Wednesday Night Skate NYC is its equivalent in New York City, also run by volunteers, albeit smaller in size.

== History ==
The documented history of inline skates dates back to the early 18th century, when enterprising inventors sought to make boots roll on wheels to emulate the gliding of ice blades on dry land. Because these wheeled skates were modeled after ice blades, their wheels were arranged in a single line. Skates were simply assumed to have a single runner, whether it was a steel blade on an ice skate or a row of wheels on a wheeled skate.

=== Wheeled skates ===
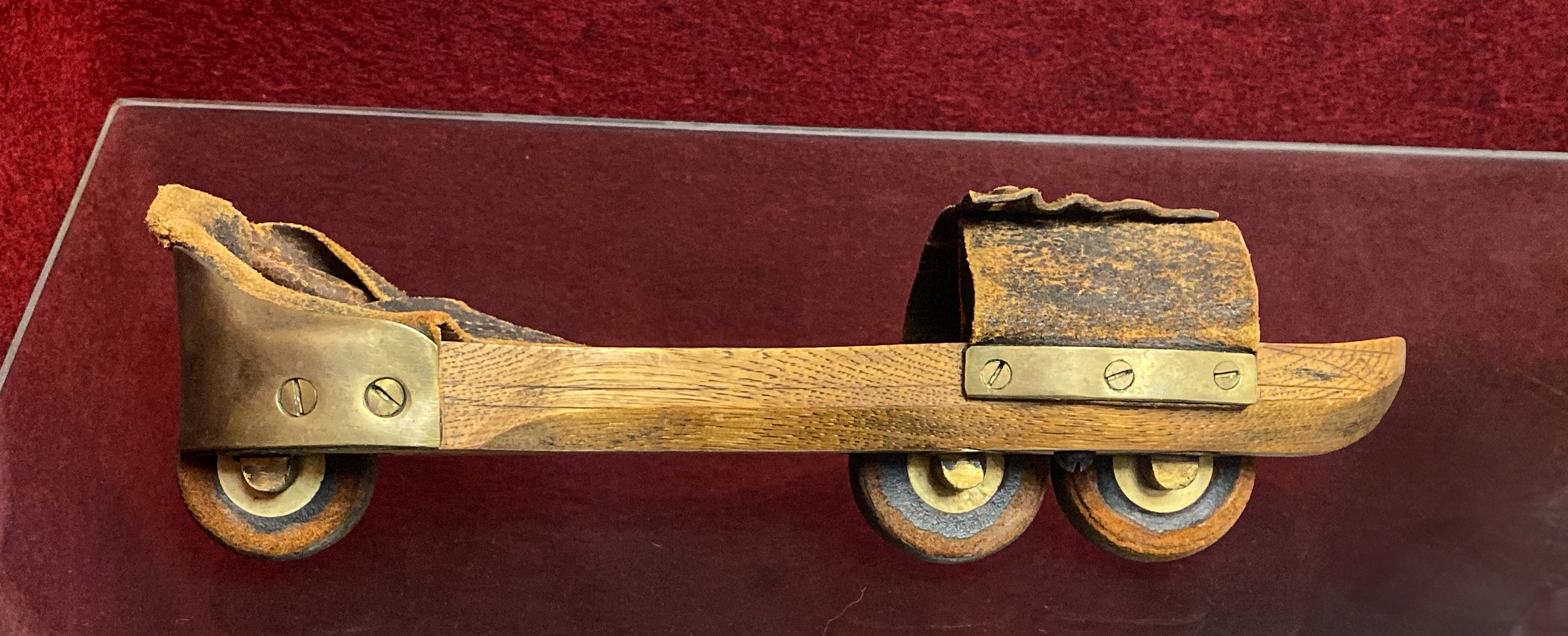
First patented wheeled skate - 1819

The first patented wheeled skate was filed in France in 1819 by Charles-Louis Petibled. From that point forward, more patents and documented designs continued to explore wheeled alternatives to ice skates. Around 1860, wheeled skates began to gain popularity, and new patents appeared under names such as "roller-skates" and "parlor skates". As inventions increased, roller skates began to diverge from the original single-line layout. Inventors experimented with two rows of wheels as a learning platform for beginner skaters. These double-row skates offered greater stability, but they were difficult to turn.

=== Roller skates ===
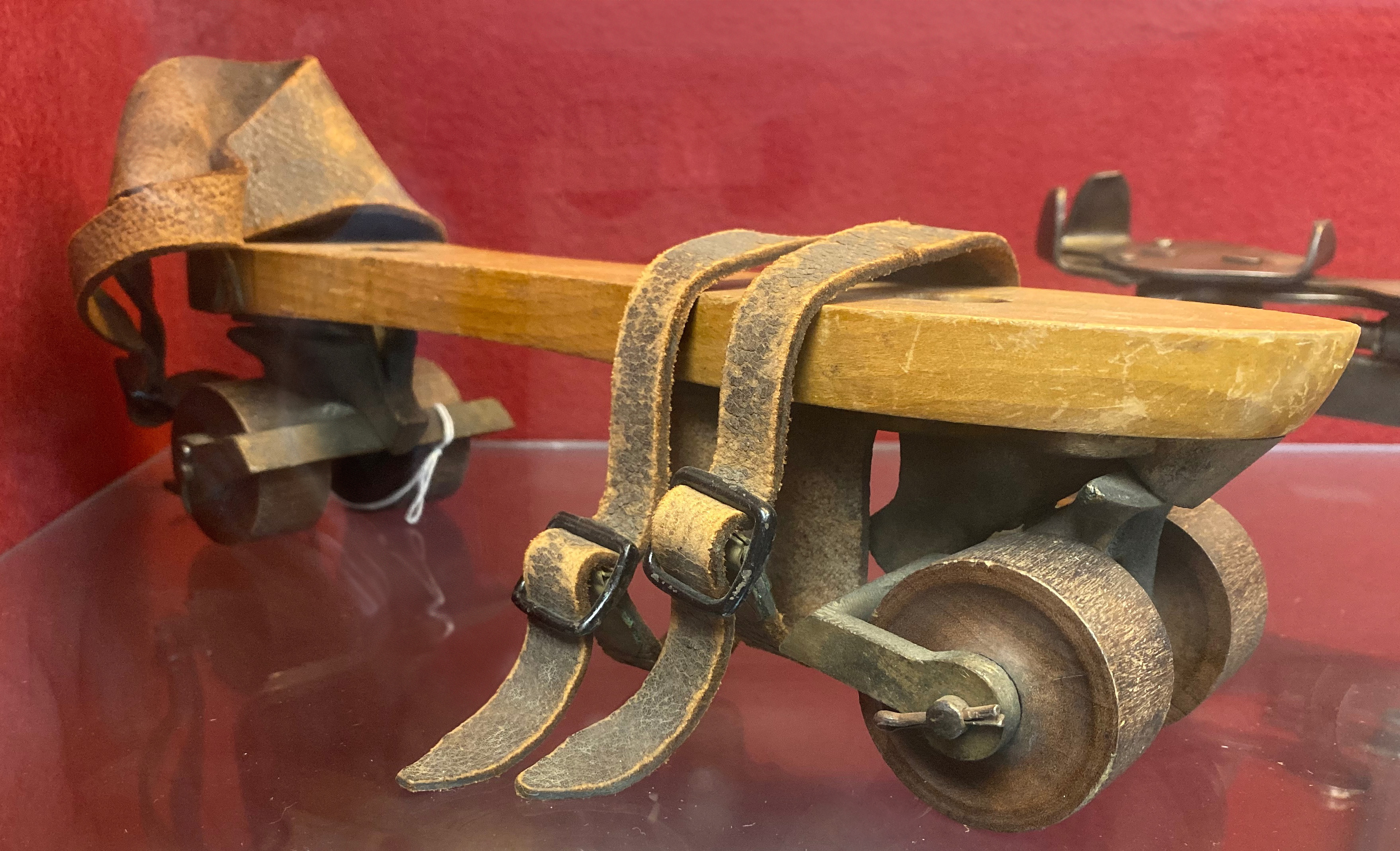
Plimpton prototype 1863-1866

In 1863, James Plimpton invented a roller skate with four wheels arranged in a two-by-two configuration, similar to a wagon, and added a clever mechanism for turning. It was the first double-row skate that allowed beginners to steer easily by simply leaning in the desired direction. Plimpton's invention sparked a rapid rise in roller skate popularity and spread across both sides of the Atlantic, creating a period of "rinkomania" during the 1860s and 1870s. His design also redefined the term "roller skate", which no longer referred to all wheeled skates but became synonymous with the "two-by-two" Plimpton style. (Note: Vandervell and Witham's 1880 book on figure skating not only covered ice skating, but dedicated a full chapter 5, named "Roller-Skating", to Plimpton's roller skates and to equivalencies of outside edges and club figures between his roller skates and ice skates. By 1880, the term "roller skates" were synonymous with Plimpton skates.)

=== After Plimpton ===
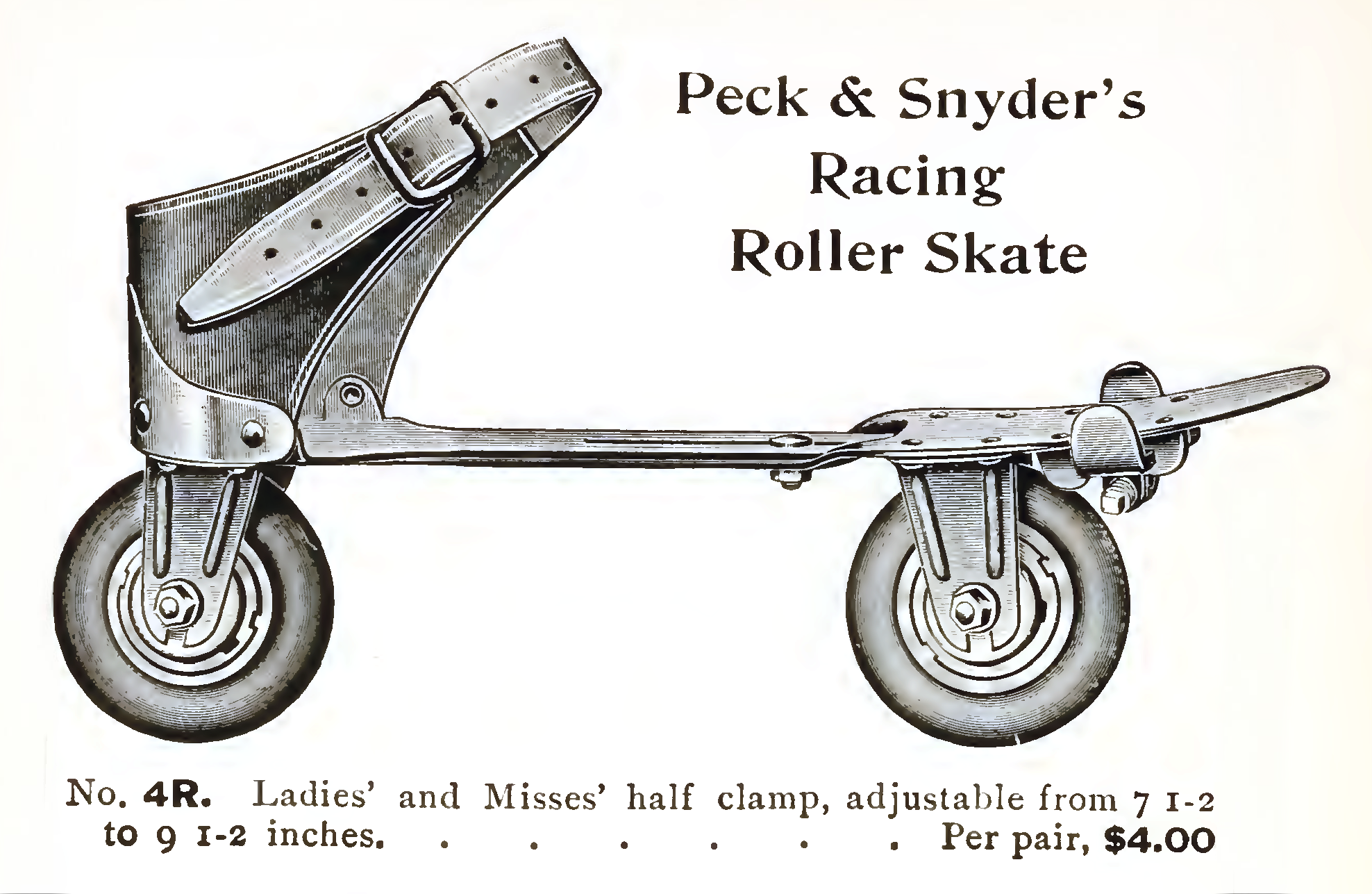
Racing Roller Skates - 1904

The development of precision ball bearings in the mid-19th century helped make bicycles more efficient and practical. By the 1880s, Plimpton-style roller skates similarly incorporated ball bearings into their wheel assemblies, making skates roll more efficiently. At the same time, manufacturers began operating skating rinks as promotional ventures from the 1880s through the 1910s. All of these further fueled the Plimpton skate craze.

Although Plimpton's roller skates took center stage, inventors and enterprises continued to introduce new roller skates with a single line of wheels between the 1870s and the 1910s. These models included features such as brakes, pneumatic tires, and foot stands placed below the center of the wheels. (Note: The main body of the skate is called the stock or foot stand, and is meant to be attached to the bottom of a shoe. See skates by Sherrif/Anderson and by Lindsley in the expanded After Plimpton section at the child article on History.)

=== Precursors ===
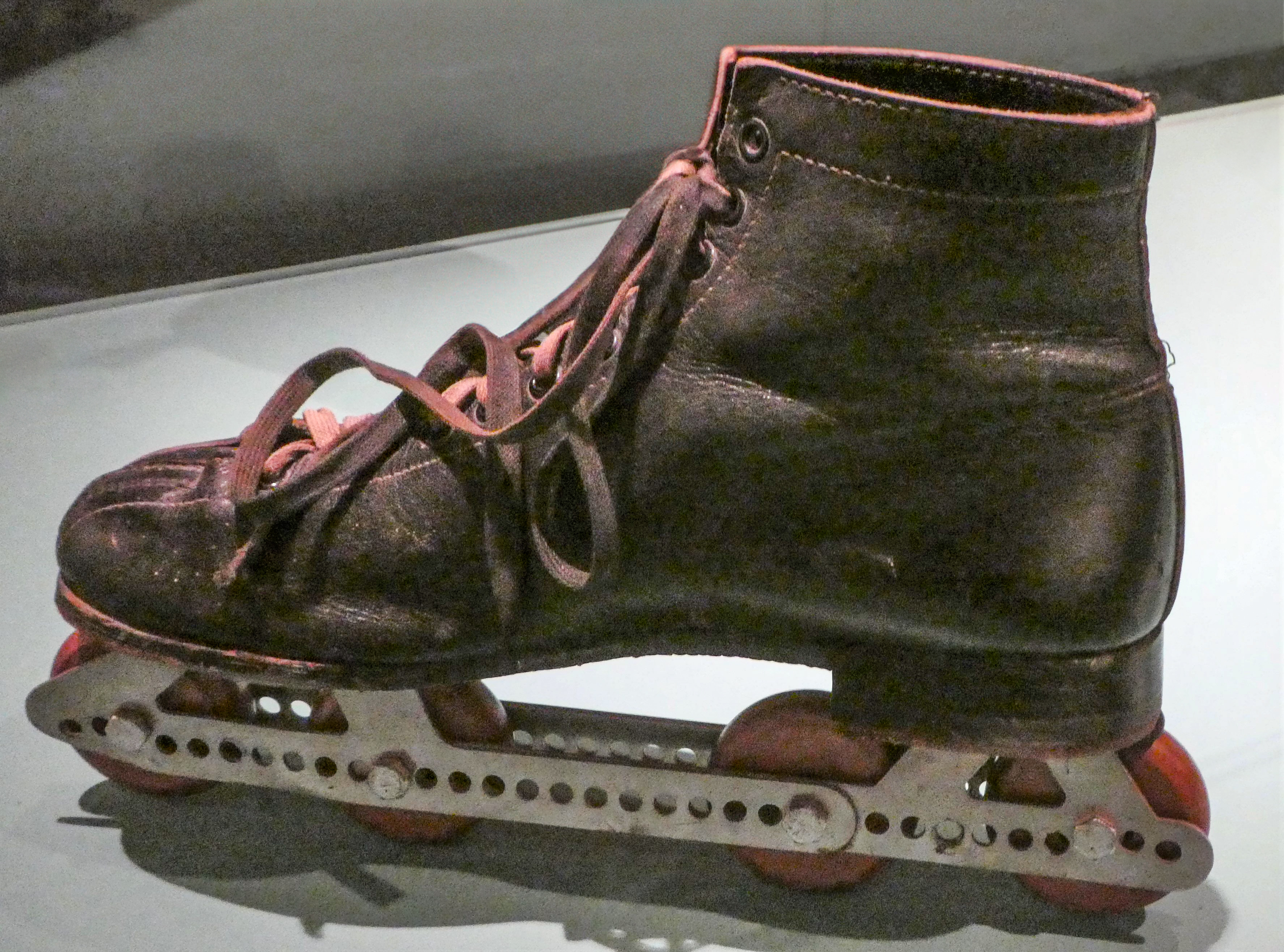
Chicago Roller-Blade - 1965

From the 1910s through the 1970s, many new variations of single-line wheeled skates were patented and manufactured. While still in the shadow of 2x2 roller skates, some models began to gain popularity among ice hockey players by the 1960s and 1970s, due to their better emulation of ice blades. In particular, off-season training skates used by USSR speed skaters inspired Gordon Ware of the Chicago Roller Skate Company to develop and patent a wheeled skate, which was sold through Montgomery Ward in 1965 under the name "Roller-Blade". (Note: See ads for the Chicago Roller-Blade in the 1965 Fall & Winter Montgomery Ward catalog, page 1082, archived here, and in the 1965 Spring & Summer Catalog, page 846, archived here.) In 1973, Ralph Backstrom promoted the Super Sport Skate, a joint venture with his friend Maury Silver, as an off-season training tool for hockey players. (Note: See ad for Super Sport Skates endorsed by Ralph Backstrom in "Faceoff" 73 / 74 season by World Hockey Association. Also see archived pictures one, two, three and four, from an antique listing.) Both of these skate models became direct precursors to modern inline skates. (Note: Reference child article History of inline skates#Modern inline skates for details)

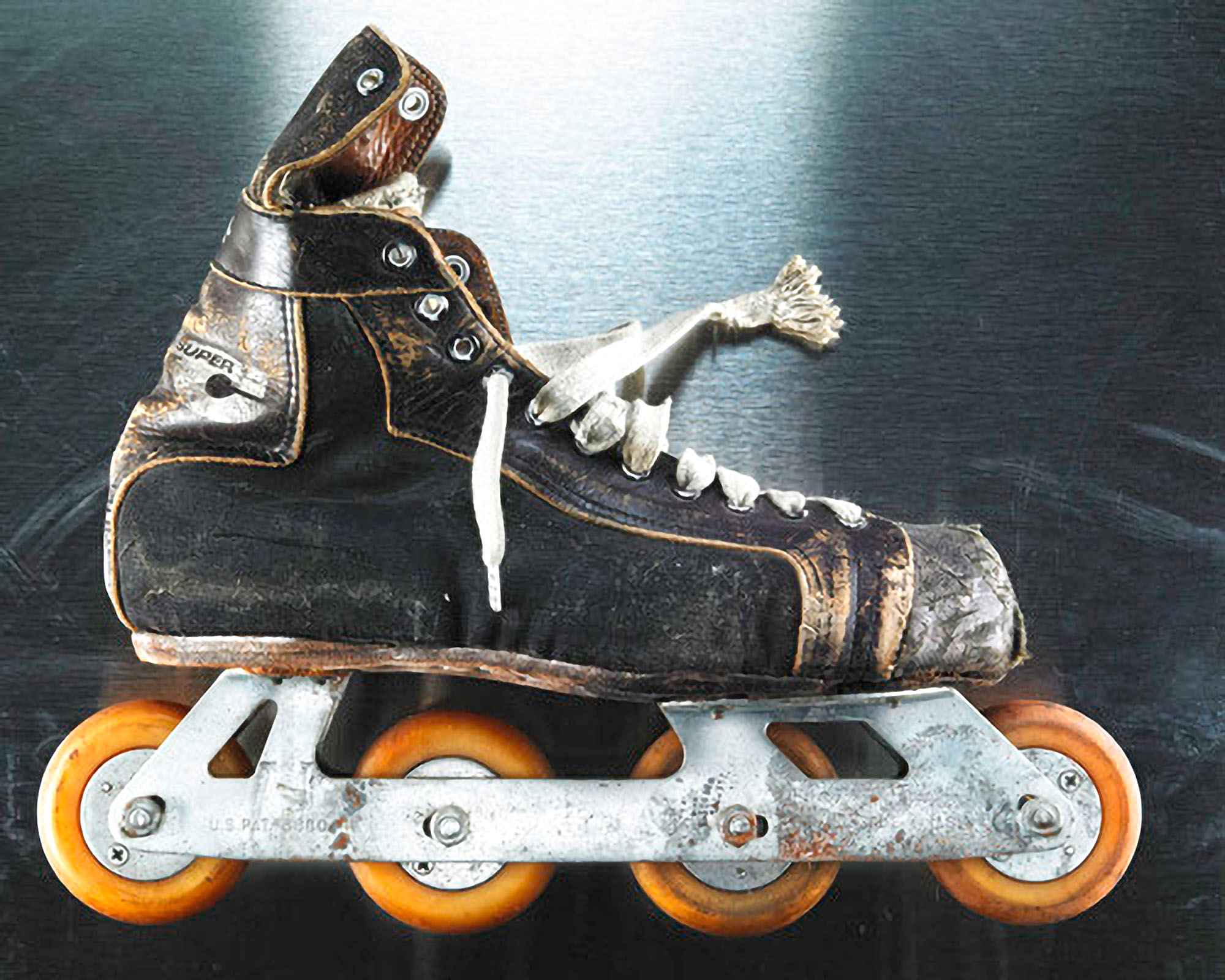
CCM Tacks boot riveted to Super Street Skate ca. 1980

In a related development, the ski boot manufacturer Lange introduced the first molded plastic ski boots with internal liners in the 1960s. In the 1970s, Lange entered the ice hockey market with similar plastic boots featuring hinged cuffs and achieved some success. Meanwhile, skateboarding reached new heights during the 1970s, thanks to the introduction of polyurethane wheels and their superior performance. The confluence of molded plastic boots with hinged cuffs, polyurethane wheels, Super Sport Skates, and the earlier Chicago Roller-Blade laid the foundation for the emergence of Rollerblade in the 1980s and its widespread appeal among the general public.

=== Modern inline skates ===
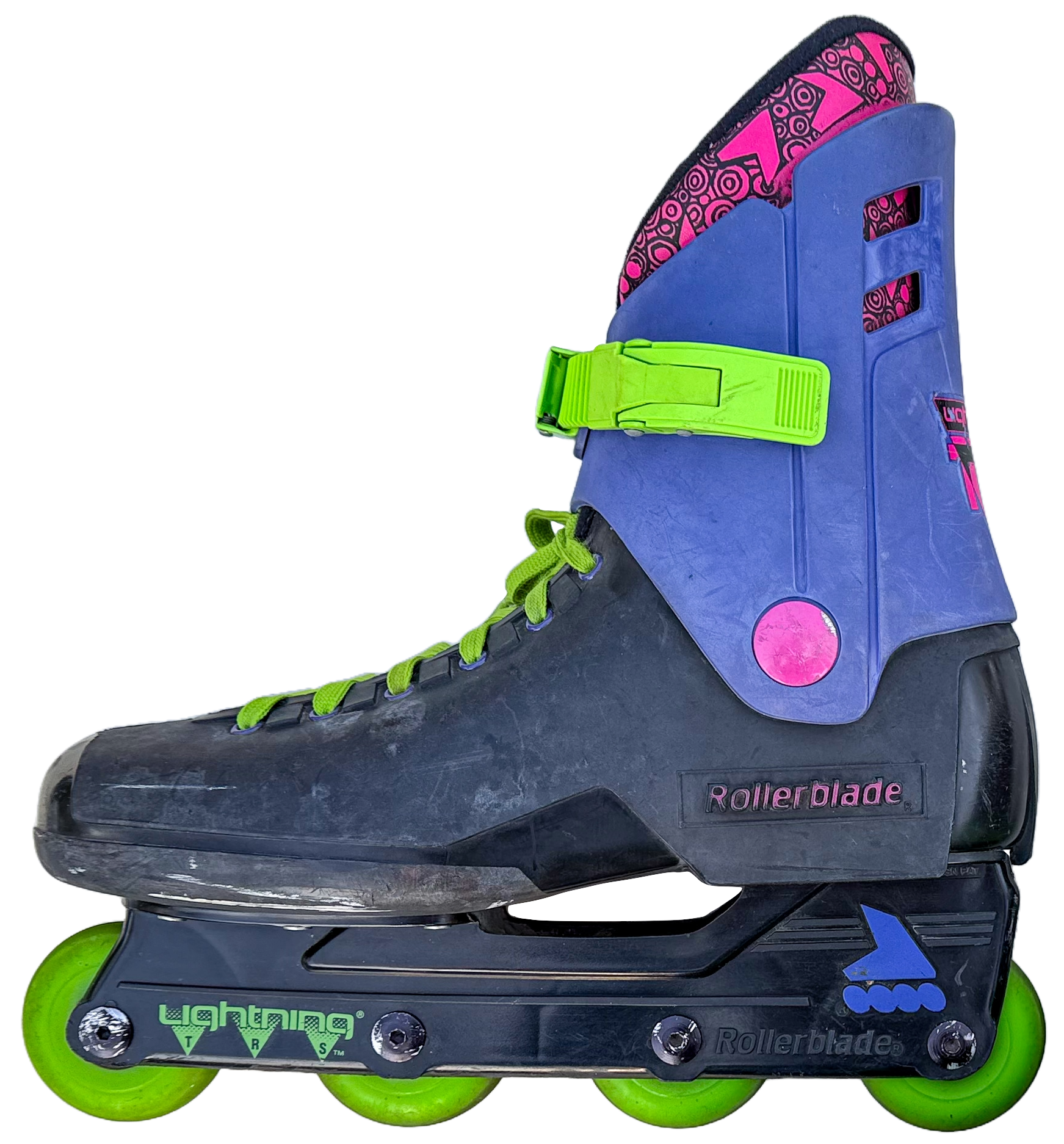
Lightning TRS from Rollerblade - 1988

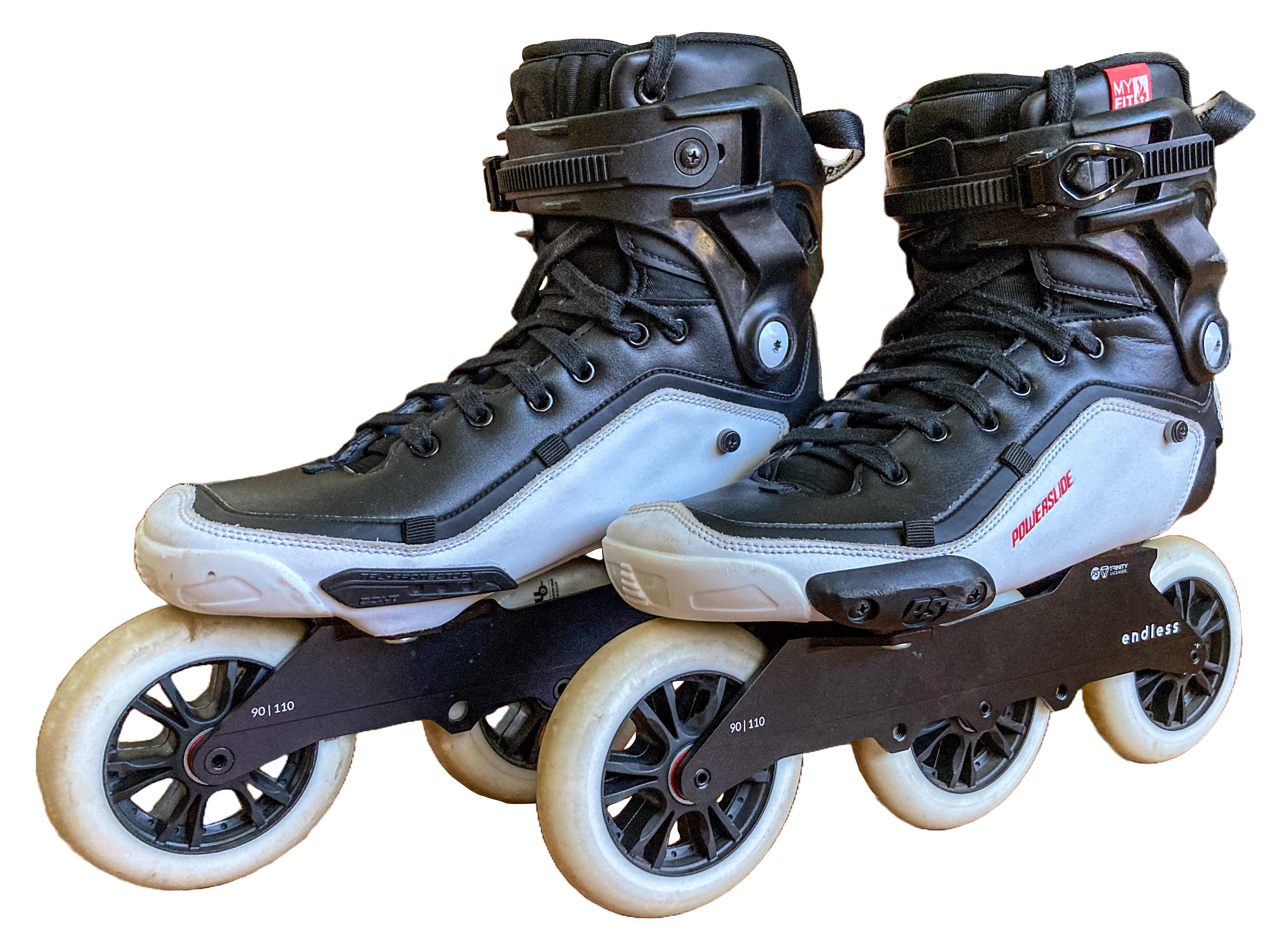
Urban inline skates - 2024

In 1979, Scott Olson, a hockey player from Minneapolis, discovered the Super Sport Skate. He began selling them to local hockey players as a licensed distributor and soon started modifying them. Olson, his brother Brennan, his family, and his friends replaced the stock boots with customers' old hockey boots and swapped out the original wheels for polyurethane ones. Through further tinkering, prototyping and road testing everywhere he could, Olson eventually arrived at a skate design with a plastic ski boot, an adjustable/expandable frame, polyurethane wheels and double ball bearings. (Note: The MIA exhibit story from 2015 includes a picture showing Scott Olson holding two prototype skates: 1) Lange boot on Super Street Skate skate with cream-colored wheels (1979), and 2) CCM Tacks hockey skate boot on his own adjustable/expandable skate design with orange polyurethane wheels (1981). Said picture is archived here. The same two prototype skates are also seen in the main article picture of this Rollerblade article from 2019, archived here. The article picture is archived here.) (Note: See pictures of early prototypes of Ultimate Street Skate with "Ole's Innovative Sports" stamped on their frames, from this page on Vintage Minnesota Hockey, such as this picture, this picture and this picture, plus this ad. Archived here, with picture, picture, picture and picture.) This skate rolled faster, and remained more reliable on road surfaces. However, a patent search revealed that the Chicago Roller-Blade already covered many of these features. In 1981, Olson persuaded the Chicago Roller Skate Company to transfer the patent to him in exchange for a share of future profits.

Thus began the modern history of inline skates, with Olson's company eventually becoming known as Rollerblade, Inc. by around 1988. The registered trademark "Rollerblade" became so well known that it entered common usage as a generic trademark. Around this time, the company began promoting the term "in-line skating" in an effort to prevent "rollerblading" from becoming a verb. The campaign proved effective, as media outlets, newspapers, and competitors adopted "in-line skating" as the preferred term by 1990. The phrase was soon shortened to "inline", the name by which these skates are known today. (Note: Reference child article History of inline skates#Rollerblade as a noun for details)

Modern inline skates became practical for mass production and appealing as a recreational activity once key technologies came together. These included polyurethane wheels, ISO 608 standard ball bearings, and molded plastic boots. These skates incorporate double ball bearings with dual-purpose axles from Chomin Harry (1925), single-piece frames from Christian Siffert (1938), adjustable wheel rockering from Gordon Ware (1966), single-unit boot/hockey frame with larger wheels from Maury Silver (1975), plus additional innovations. (Note: The Precursor section of the child article on History includes further details on Harry's dual-purpose axles, Siffert's single-piece frames, Ware's adjustable wheel rockering, and Silver's single-unit hockey skates.)

== Design and function ==
=== Components ===
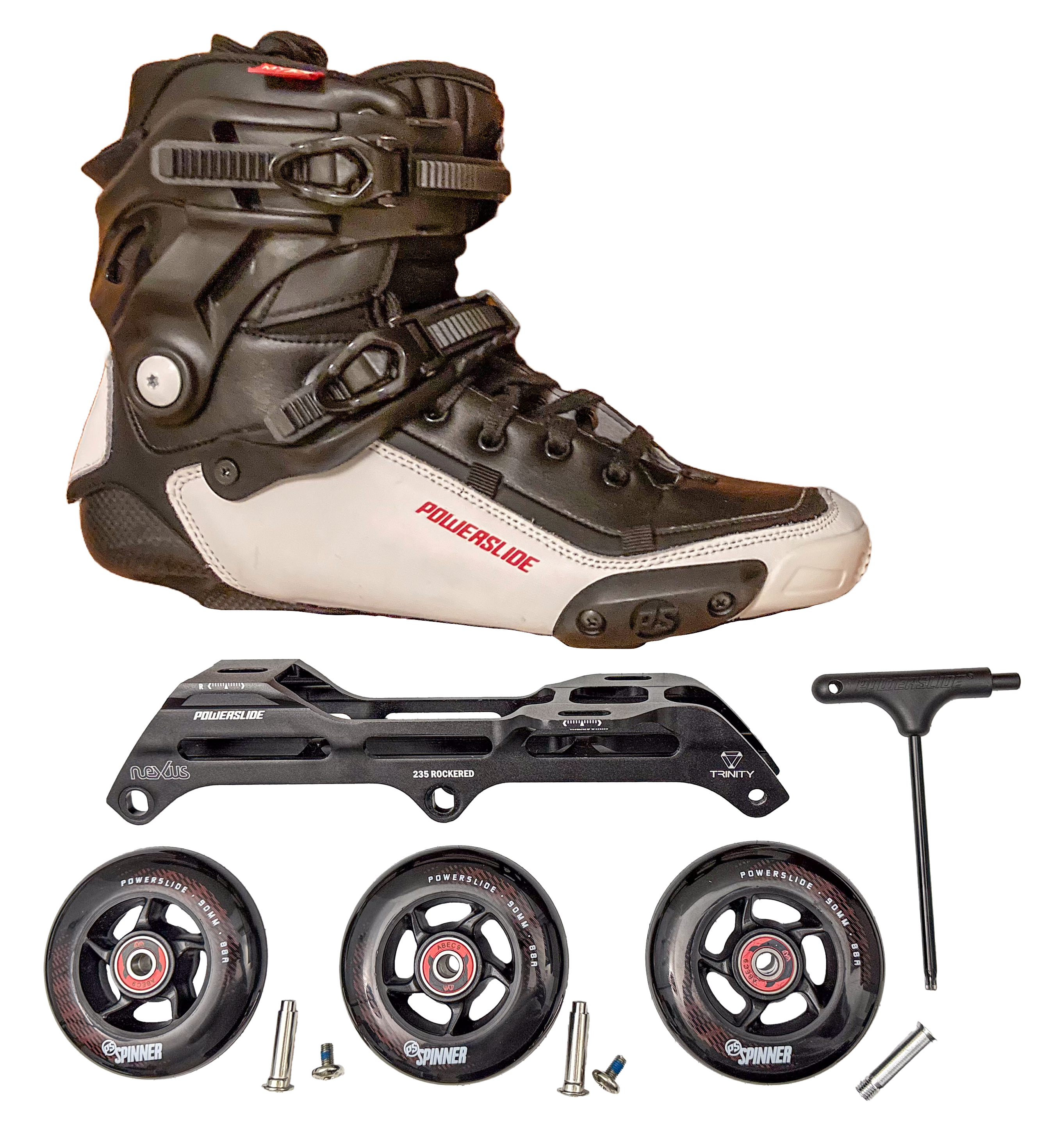
Boot, frame, wheels, bearings, axles and tool

All modern inline skates share a common basic blueprint. A skate comprises a boot, worn on the foot. To the bottom of the boot is attached a frame, the most rigid part of the skate. The frame holds a number of wheels in place with wheel axles. In between a wheel and an axle are two bearings. Bearings allow a wheel to rotate freely around its axle. Finally, a rubber brake typically attaches to the frame of the right boot, on recreational skates.

For many skaters, the frame is never removed or replaced. But wheels are consumables, as they wear down with use, and require periodic mounting rotations and even replacements. Inline skates usually come with a skate tool for wheel, bearing and frame maintenance. The tool will have a hex wrench or a Torx wrench for removing wheel axles from a frame, and wherever applicable, for removing bearings from a wheel, and for removing a frame from a boot.

=== Securing the foot ===
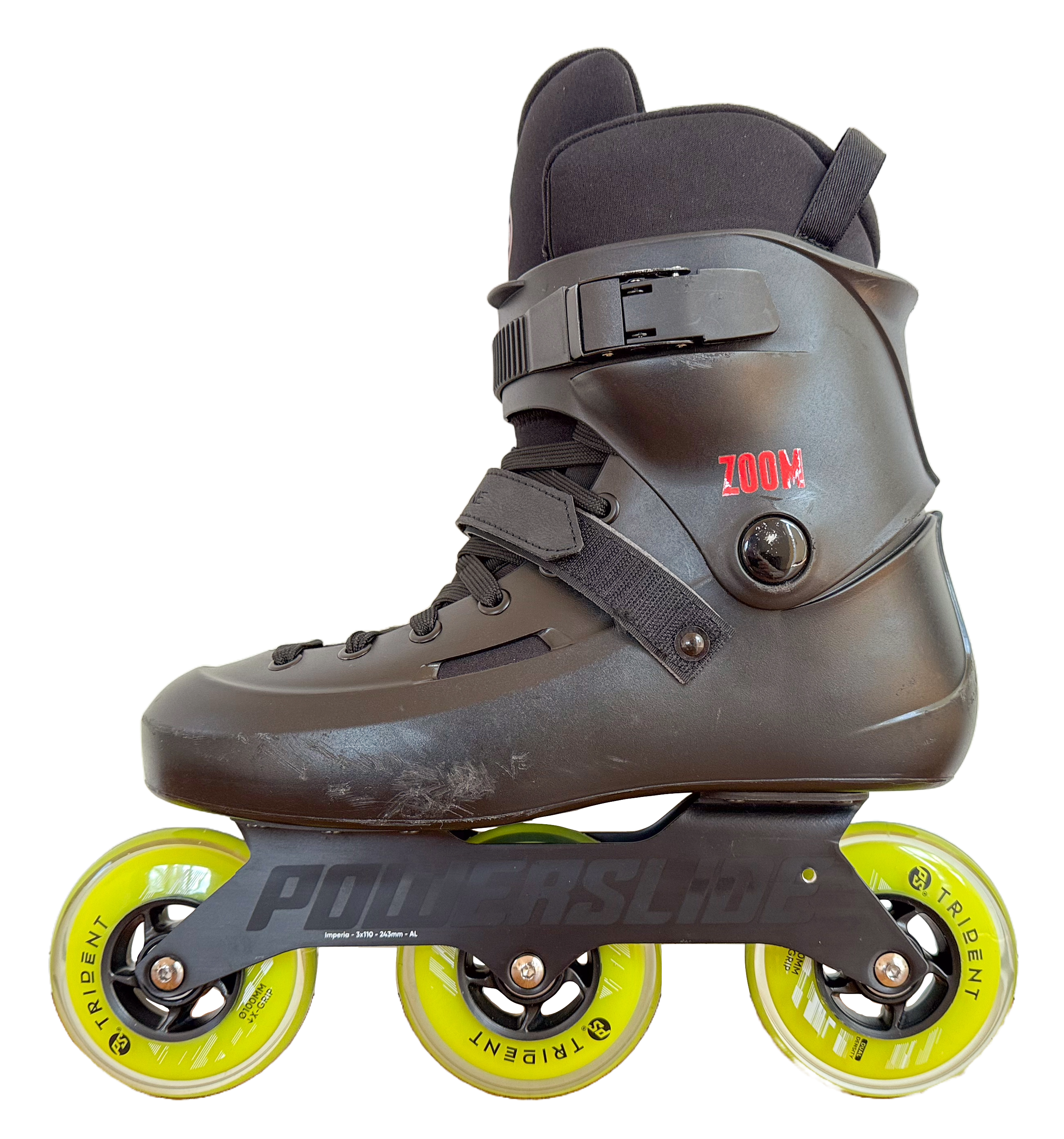
Hard boot

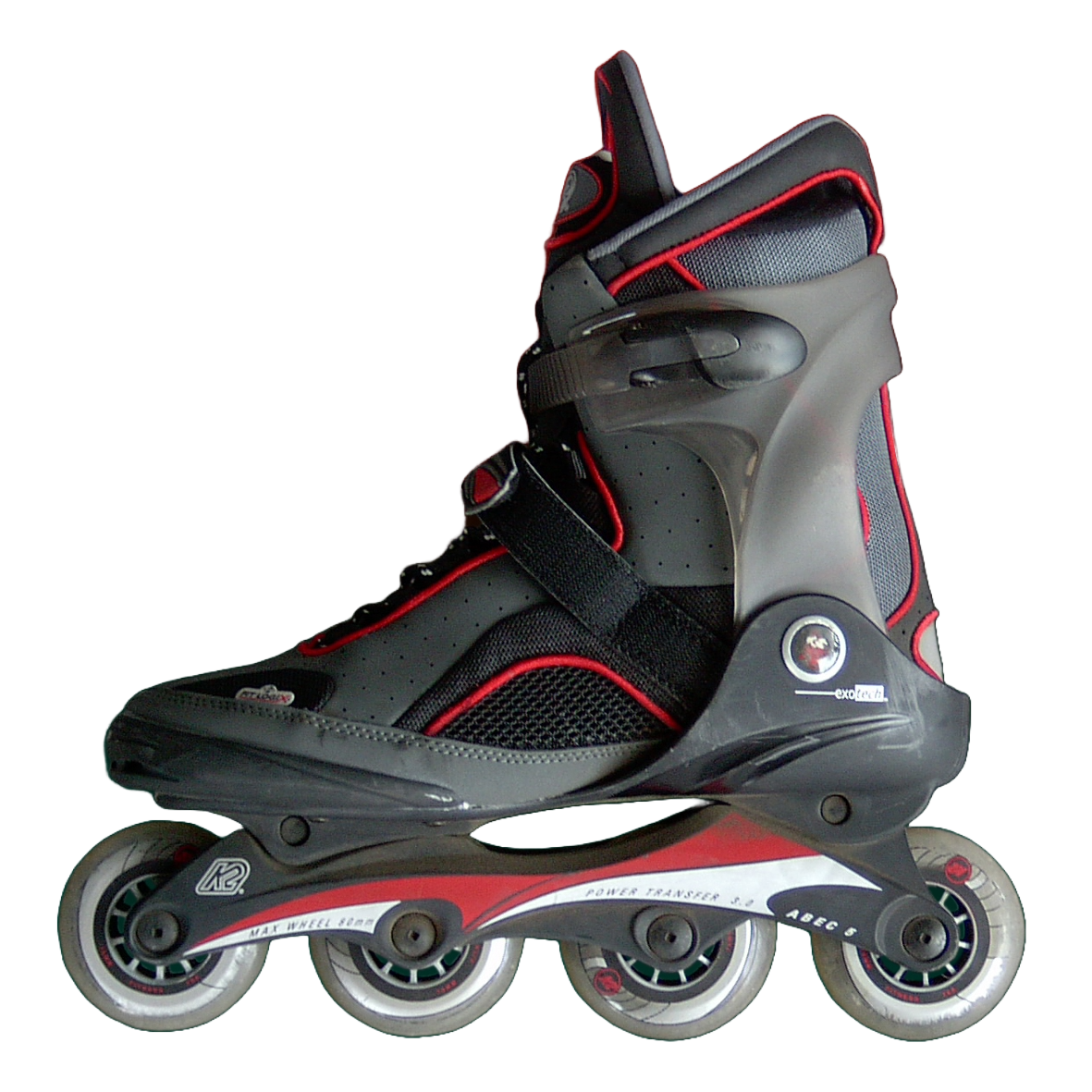
Soft boot

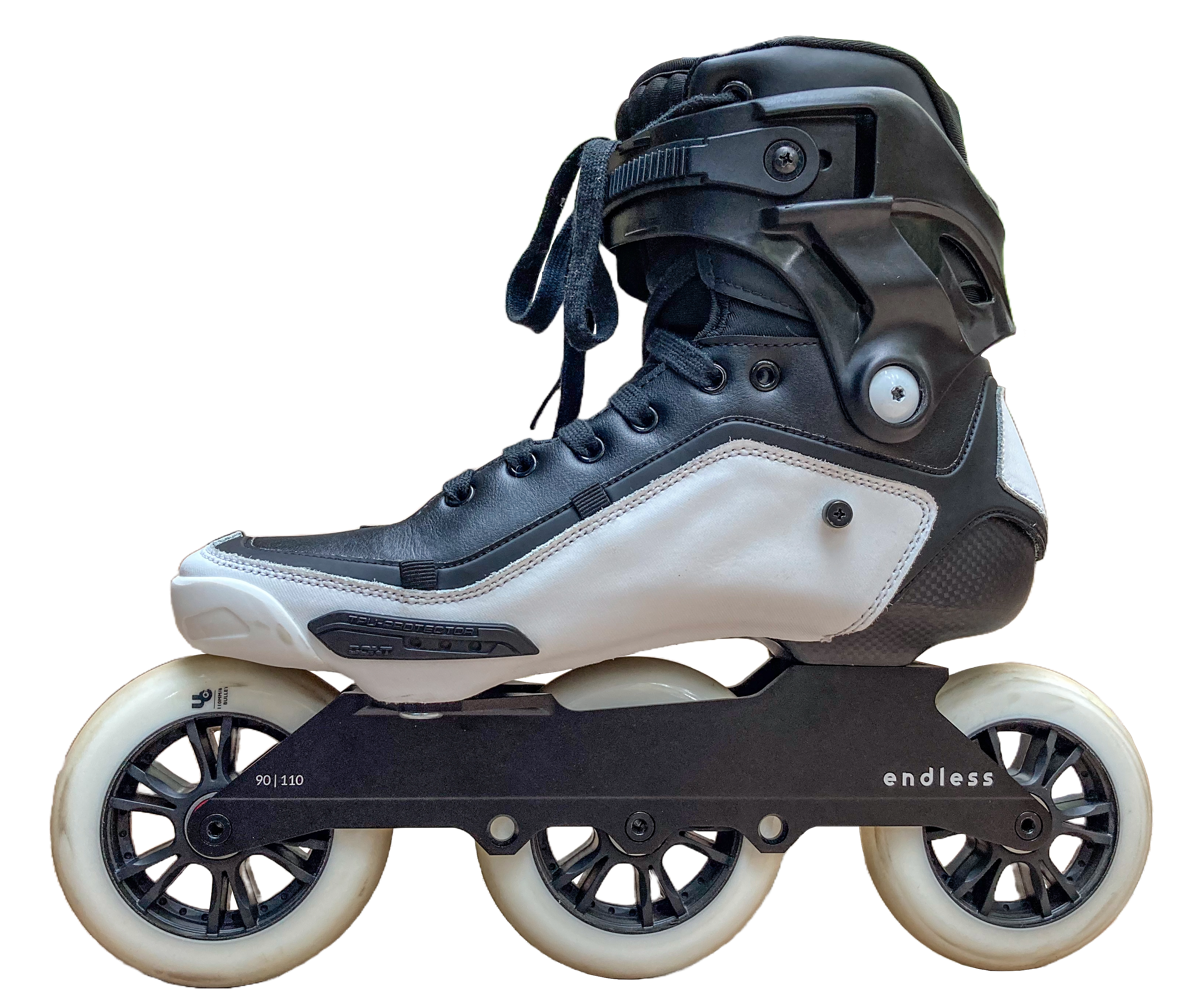
Hybrid boot

In the 1980s and 1990s, all inline skates had hard boots, borrowed from ski boot designs. A removable liner in a hard boot provides a snug yet comfortable fit between a skater's foot and the hard shell. Around 1996, K2 introduced soft boots with an exoskeleton. These provide the most comfortable fit, at the expense of reduced rigidity. In the 2010s, hybrid (soft) boots with an endoskeleton were introduced to the high-end market. A hybrid boot has an integrated, non-removable liner. This is glued to a rigid endoskeleton shell integrated with the sole, providing direct power transfer from the foot to the wheels.

All three types are able to secure a foot in them without slack, with proper closure systems. Soft boots are often laced, and hard shells are usually secured with buckles. Velcro straps are also common in all types of boots. Well-designed boots provide proper heel support and ankle support to a skater.

=== Trade-offs ===
Choosing the right skates involves weighing various trade-offs. The length of a frame positively affects stability and negatively affects turning agility. Longer frames accommodate more wheels, and taller frames larger wheels; both positively affect top skating speed. Modern inline skates are equipped with polyurethane wheels. Softer wheels provide a better grip on smooth indoor surfaces, while harder wheels wear down less on rough outdoor surfaces. Beginners skate with all wheels touching the ground, for enhanced stability, known as a flat wheel setup. Advanced skaters may choose to configure wheels in a rockered setup for enhanced maneuverability. The weight of a skate is an important consideration for some disciplines. Lighter boots, frames, and wheels are preferred. However, weight reduction is only achieved with escalating costs and diminishing returns.

=== Striding and gliding ===
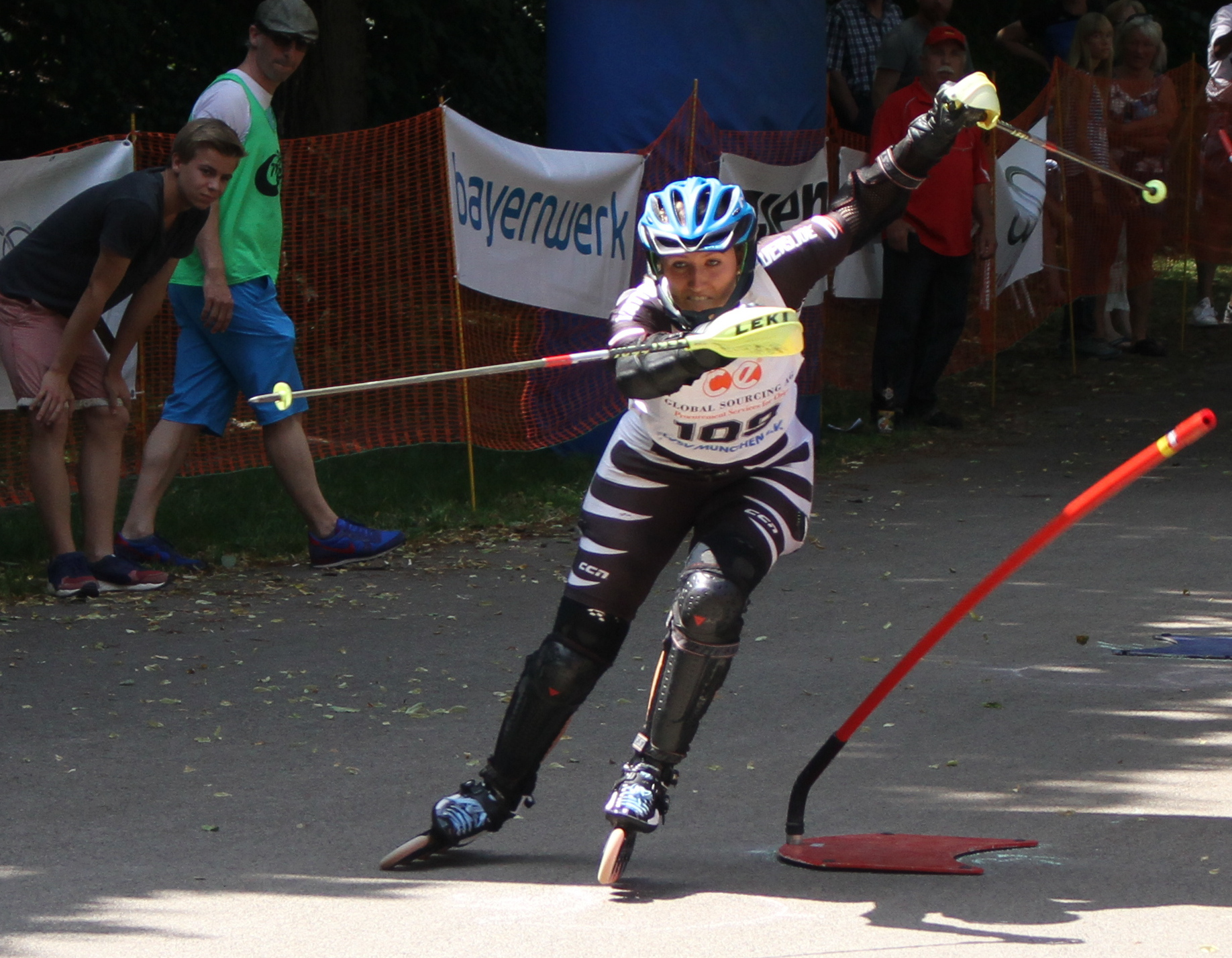
Striding

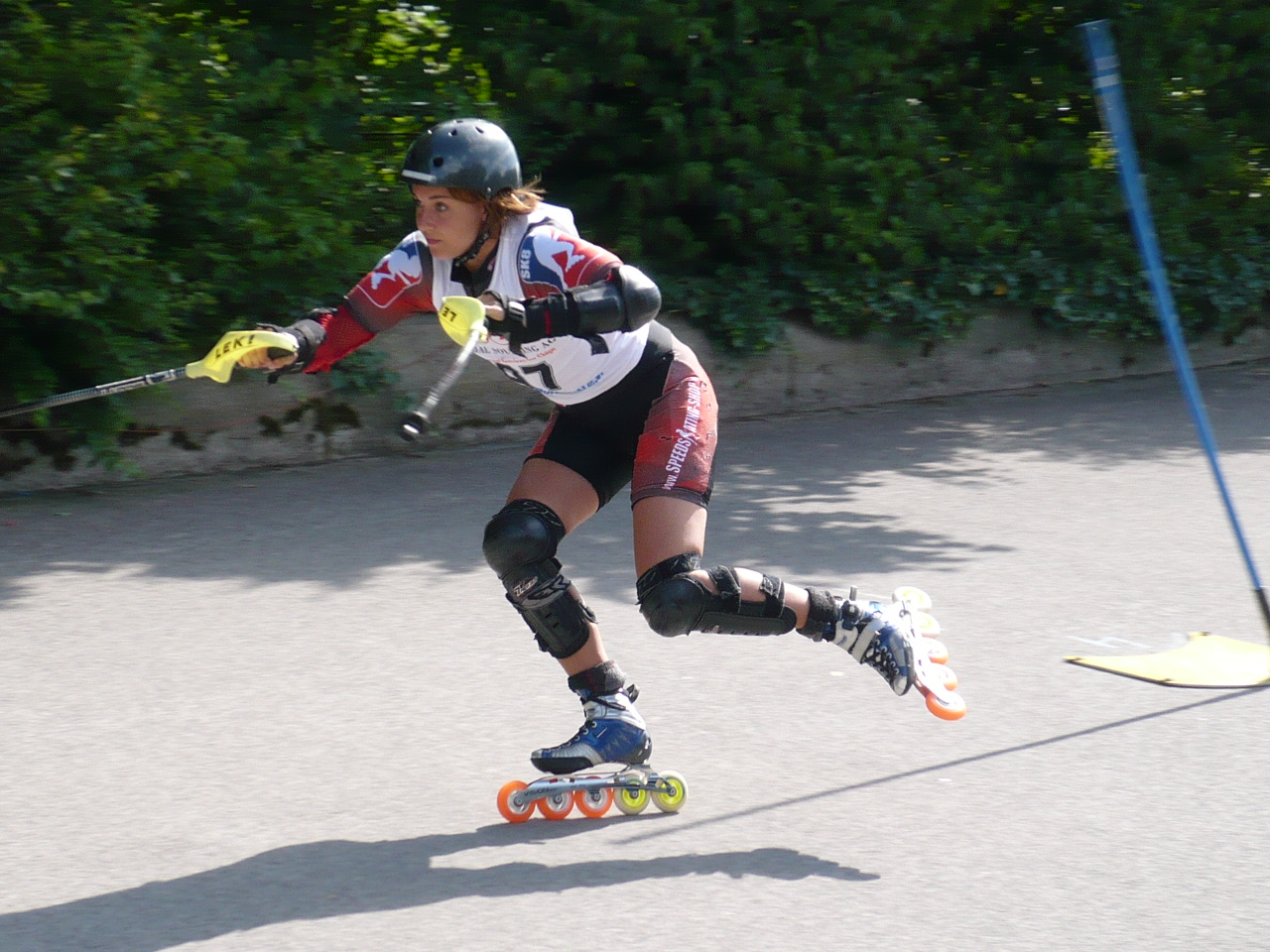
Gliding

Recreational inline skating involves a continuous interplay between striding and gliding. As one foot pushes laterally against the ground during the striding phase, it converts sideways force into forward momentum. Meanwhile, the opposite foot glides ahead, supporting the skater's weight. These phases overlap fluidly, with each skate alternating between pushing and gliding in a coordinated rhythm that sustains forward motion.

These two movements place distinct and often conflicting demands on skate design. A powerful stride benefits from a large contact area between the wheels and the ground, maximizing static friction for a more forceful push-off. In contrast, a smooth and sustained glide calls for minimal contact to minimize rolling friction. Much of inline skate design involves balancing these opposing requirements to achieve both propulsion and efficiency.

=== Edging and turning ===
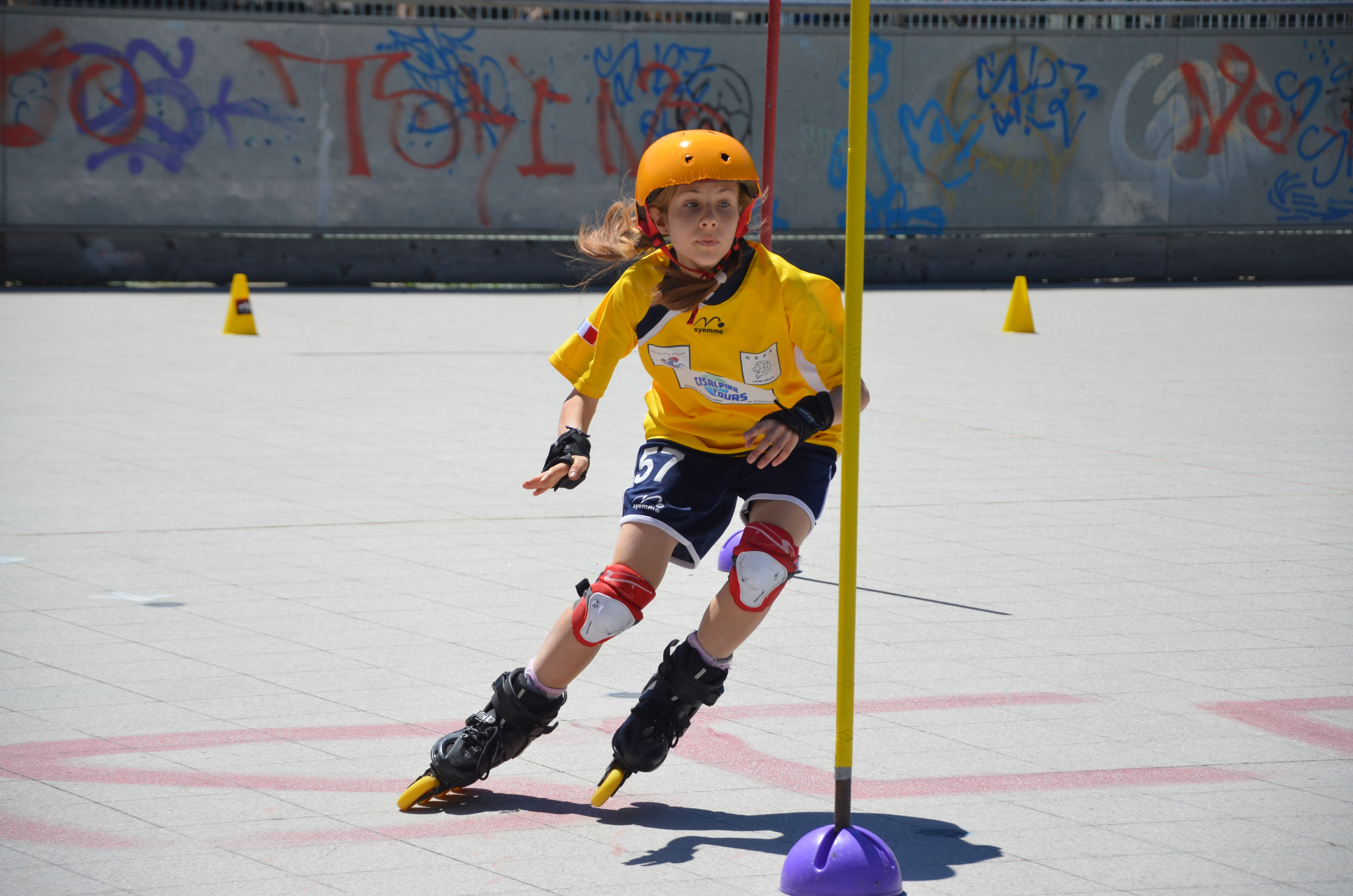
Edging for fast turns

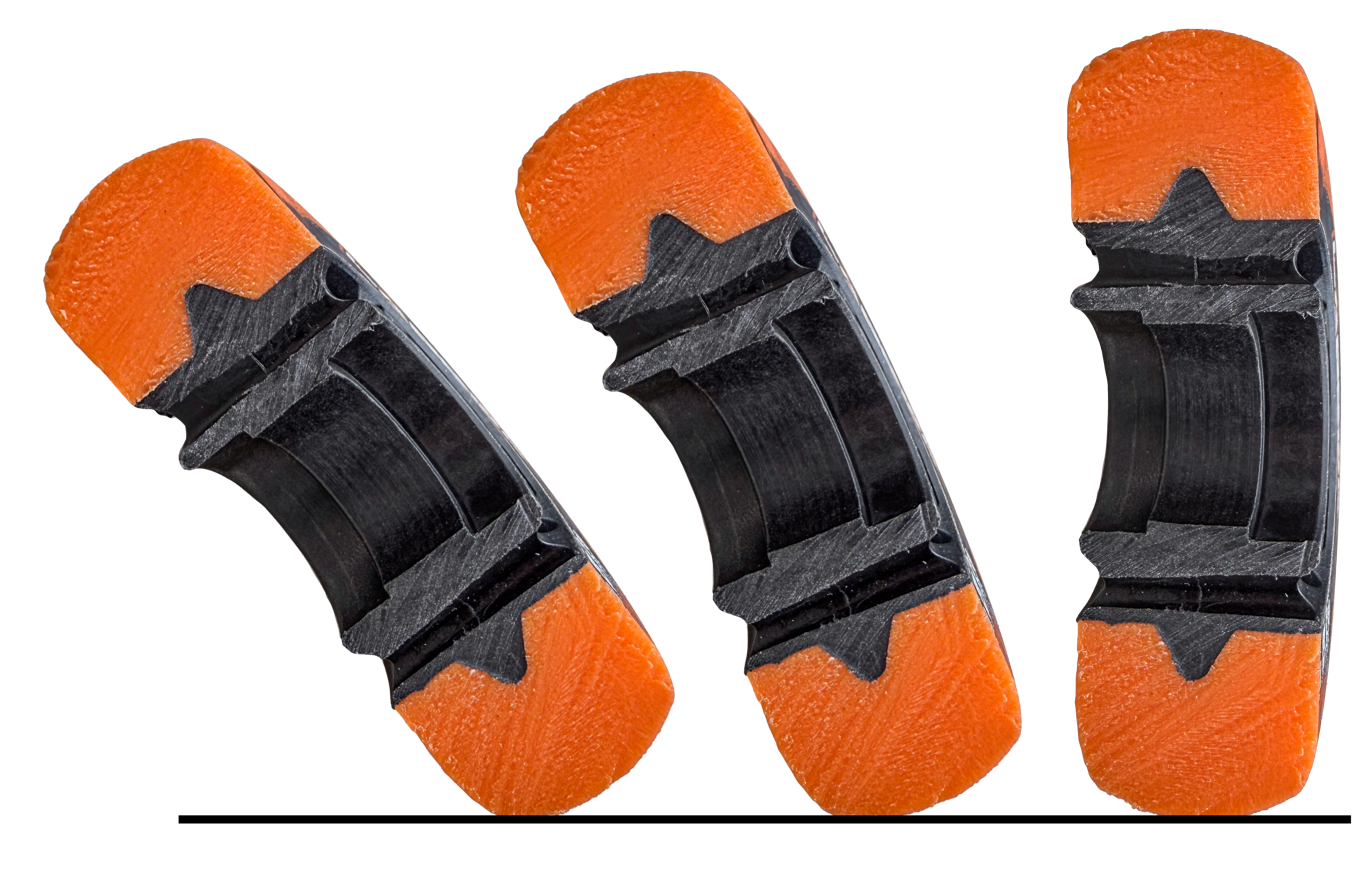
Three edging angles

Modern inline skate design was heavily influenced by ice hockey. Early inline skates from the 1980s aimed to replicate the feel of hockey skate blades, often using a rockered wheel setup to allow easier turning and quick directional changes. While slalom skaters relied on these rockered setups and hockey players made rapid turns using crossover maneuvers, recreational skaters soon realized that even a flat wheel setup could support effective turning, thanks to the grip provided by polyurethane wheels on pavement. As with ice skating, inline skaters could shift their body weight and apply pressure to one side of the skate to gradually turn while gliding.

This technique is known as "edging", which involves tilting the skate to roll on one side of the wheels. Skaters use both sides of the wheels for different maneuvers. The inside edge refers to the side of the wheel facing the skater's body, while the outside edge faces away. (Note: Inline skating adopts the terms "outside edge" and "inside edge" from ice skating, even though inline wheels lack the sharp dual edges of ice blades. The outside edge refers to the side of the wheel facing away from the skater's body, while the inside edge is the side facing inward.) Edging is essential not only for turning but also for powerful stride pushes, which require a strong edge angle. Deep edging, however, requires proper support from the boot, frame, and wheels to prevent the foot from wobbling within the boot and to keep the wheels from sliding out from under the skater.

=== Heel support ===
Heel support refers to the ability of a boot to keep a skater's heel comfortably seated and firmly locked down in the heel pocket of the boot, even during aggressive maneuvering.

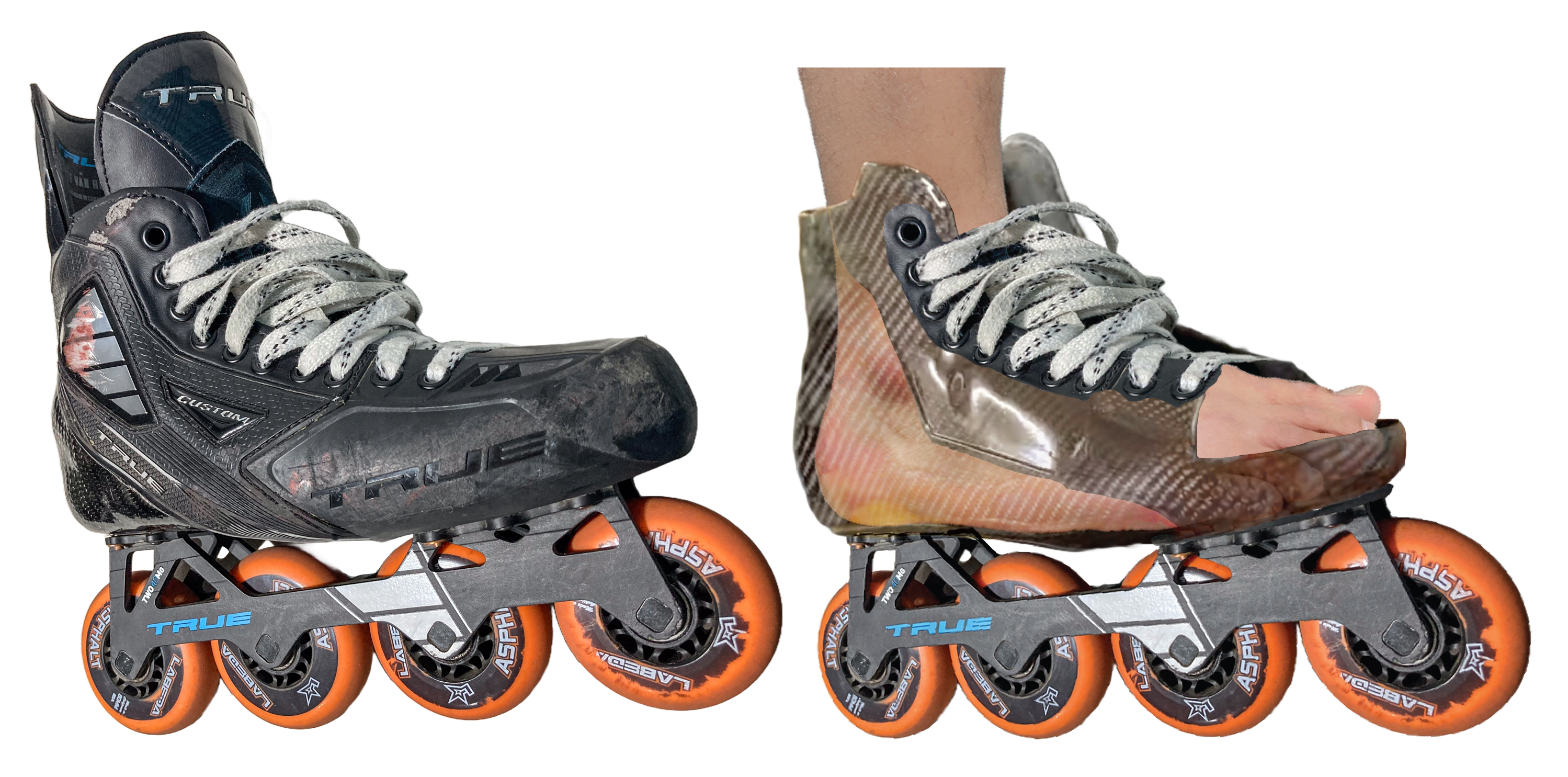
A contoured heel pocket and a proper closure system work together to lock in the heel

A "heel pocket" is formed by the shell, inner liner and sole of a boot. A properly designed boot has a heel pocket that hugs the heel, with an anatomical contour. A proper closure system causes the "facing" (where eyelet tabs are) to push the instep against the heel pocket, preventing the foot from shifting or lifting during maneuvers. As a result, the heel remains in contact with the footbed at all times.

=== Heel lock ===
Proper heel lock serves as a stable foundation for the entire foot. It allows a skater to adopt an athletic stance for skating by flexing the lower leg forward, without lifting the heel from the insole. A snug fit means reduced movement of the foot within the skate, and thus reduced opportunity for friction to cause blisters. At the same time, the whole skate becomes transfixed to the foot as an extension of it, allowing efficient strides with a faithful transfer of power from the foot to the ground.

=== Ankle support ===
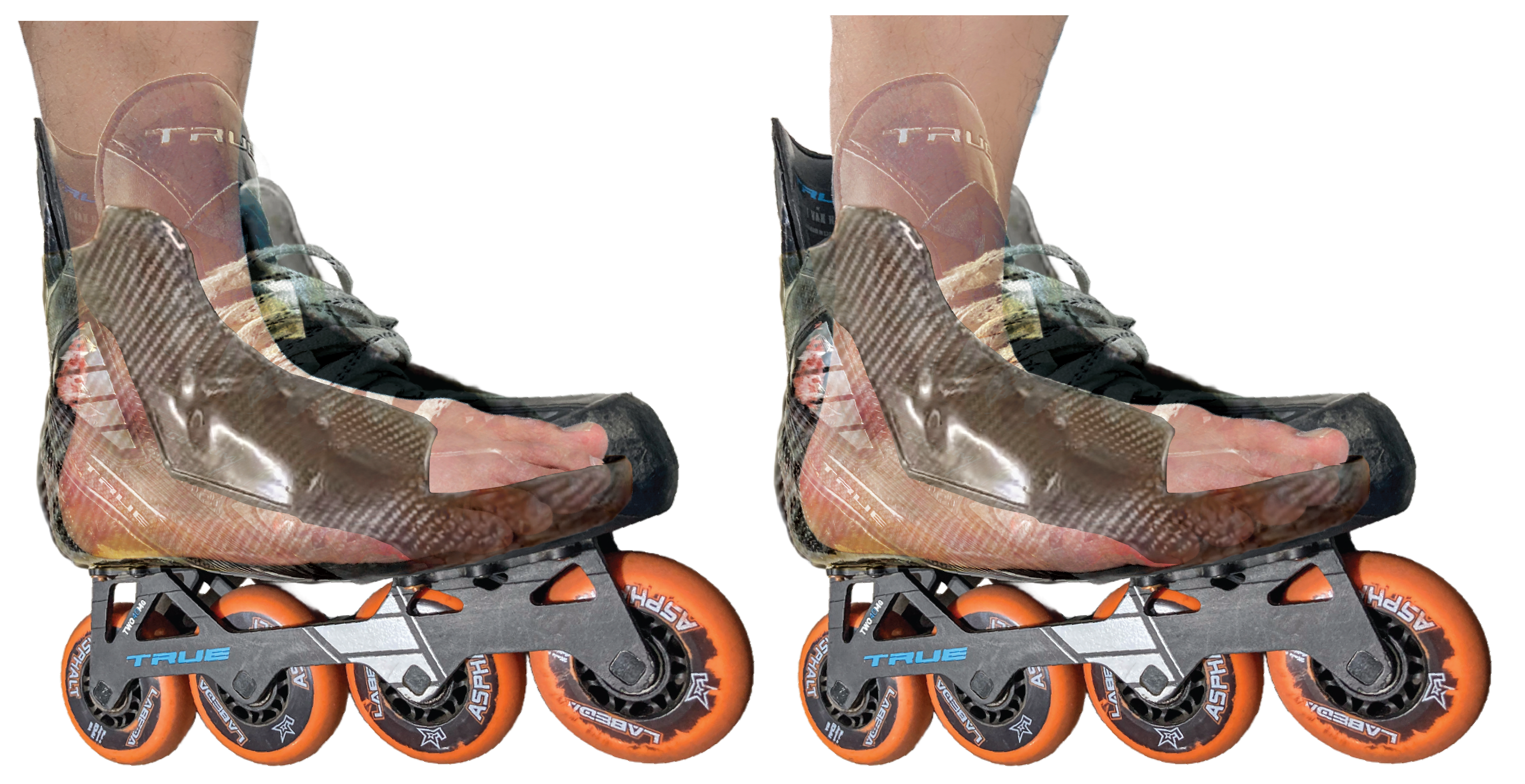
Rigid carbon-fiber quarter panels of this hockey boot prevents sideway wobbles of the foot while allowing the shin to flex forward

Ankle support refers to the ability of a boot to prevent sideways movement of a skater's ankle and lower leg, while allowing the shin to flex forward into an athletic stance. In some skates, such as recreational and aggressive skates, this is achieved via a hinged cuff. In other skates, such as hockey skates, this is enabled by rigid, and anatomically shaped quarter panels that lock the ankle in place, from two sides, leaving the shin to freely pivot forward. One primary concern of ankle support involves accommodating the two bony malleolus protrusions on either side of the ankle, colloquially known as ankle bones. (Note: "Anklebone" technically refers to the talus bone, but laypeople usually refer to medial malleolus and lateral malleolus, the two bony protrusions on either side of the ankle, as ankle bones. Boot designs are preoccupied with anatomically closing the foot, including these two malleolus bones. See claim 1 of the 2012 Bauer Hockey patent.)

Proper ankle support allows a novice skater to keep a skate upright as a straight extension of their entire leg, when observed from the front. Without rigid support on both sides of the ankle, the foot may wobble within the boot, causing the skate to tilt inward or outward. This typically creates pronation in beginners based on natural bipedal gait, making it harder for a skater to glide on a single skate at best, and resulting in sprains and other injuries at worst.

=== Forward flex ===
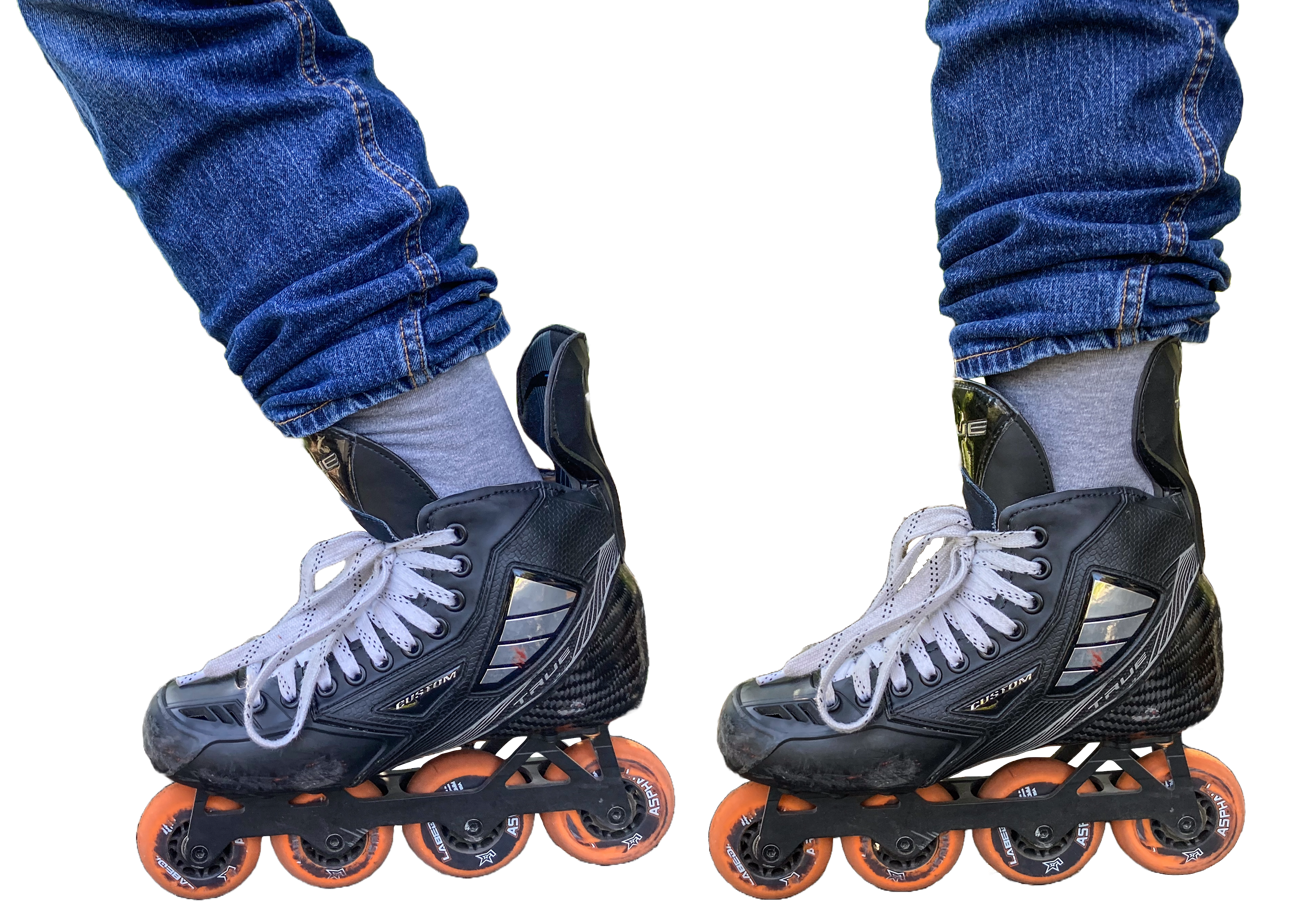
Dorsiflexion (left) vs leg extended straight (right)

A properly designed boot allows a skater to pivot the lower leg (the shin) forward about the ankle joint to adopt a squatting (athletic) stance, despite the sideway ankle support. This forward flex (or forward leaning) is known as dorsiflexion of the foot. It places the center of body mass atop the ball of the foot, a balancing skill crucial to most skating moves. This deep squatting posture also produces powerful push-offs, with the farthest displacement of the striding skate.

Without such a squatting stance, the leg and the skate form a 90° angle, placing the entire body weight of a skater on the rear wheel of the skate. This is dangerous for a beginner because a small backward shift of the upper body will cause a skater to pivot their entire body on the rear wheel, and thus fall uncontrollably backward.

=== Heel raise ===
Some inline skates feature a boot design where the heel is positioned substantially higher than the toe. This forward tilt encourages the skater to lean slightly forward by default, simulating a mild forward flex. The design is commonly referred to as "heel raise" or a "raised heel". The height difference between the heel and toe is known in the footwear industry as the "heel-to-toe drop" or simply the "pitch". Pitch can result from a combination of frame mounting design, as seen in the 165mm and Trinity standards, and from using wheels of different sizes, as in hockey skates that employ a hi-lo setup.

Heel raise is sometimes called "heel lift". However, the term "heel lift" also colloquially describes a completely different condition: heel slippage - the lack of heel lock. In this case, the heel lifts off the insole when the skater flexes the shin forward, which can lead to inefficiencies and blisters.

== Types ==
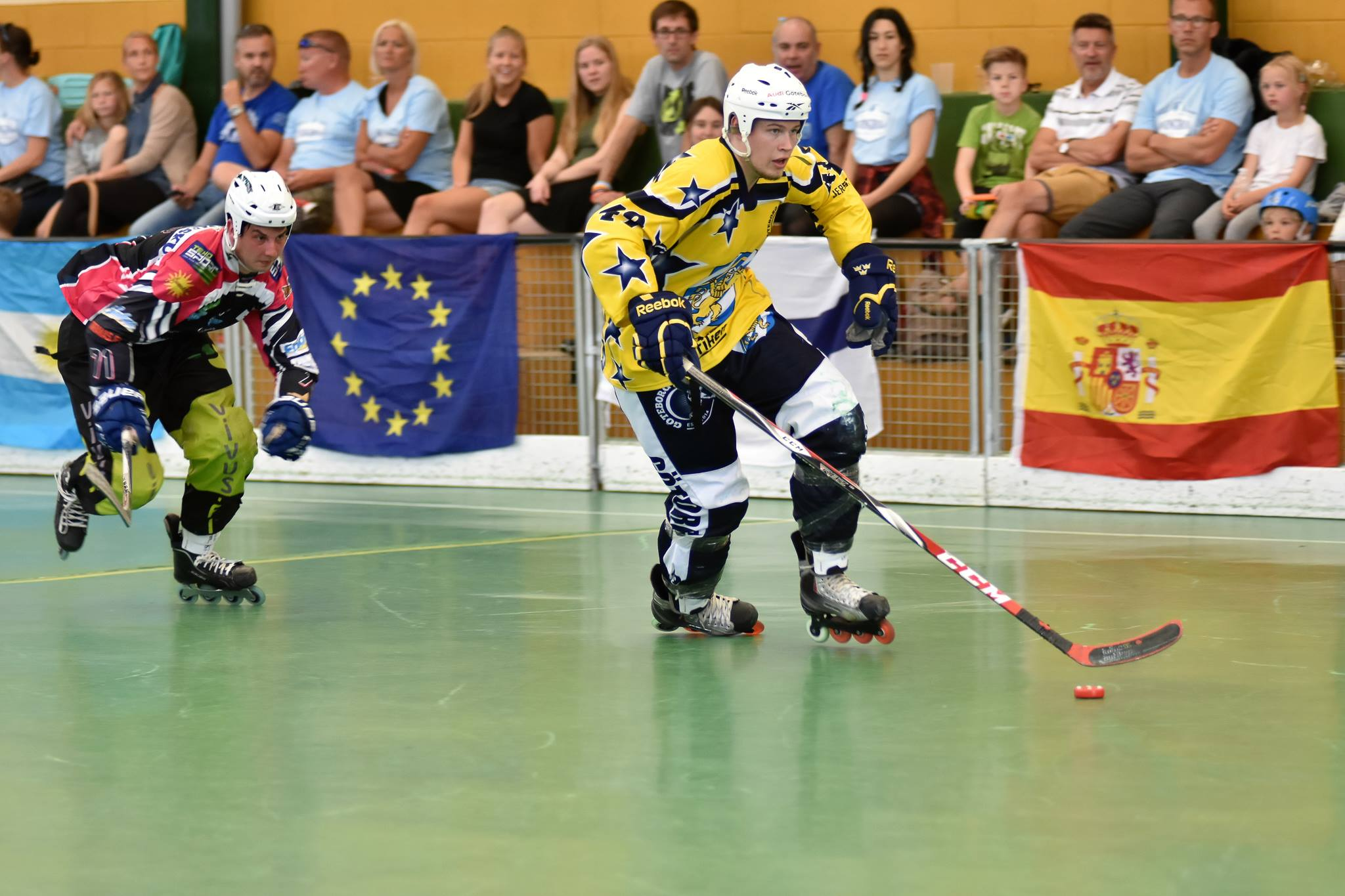
Inline hockey in Sweden

There are a variety of ways to design and make modern inline skates. Different types of inline skates reflect needs specific to different inline skating disciplines, such as recreational skating, urban skating, roller hockey, street hockey, speed skating, slalom skating, aggressive skating, and artistic inline skating.

Manufacturers and resellers generally classify inline skates based on disciplines, such as aggressive skates, speed skates and hockey skates. Some disciplines are not large enough to warrant their own classification. Thus, dissimilar disciplines with similar equipment needs are grouped under a single skate category. For instance, freestyle skating, slalom skating, wizard skating, city commuting, and urban skating may be crammed into a single "urban skates" category. Then, there are the rest of skaters who casually skate, skate for fitness, or skate for cross-training. These purposes constitute 90% of actual inline skate sales. Skates suitable for these activities are often grouped together as "recreational skates".

=== Recreational ===
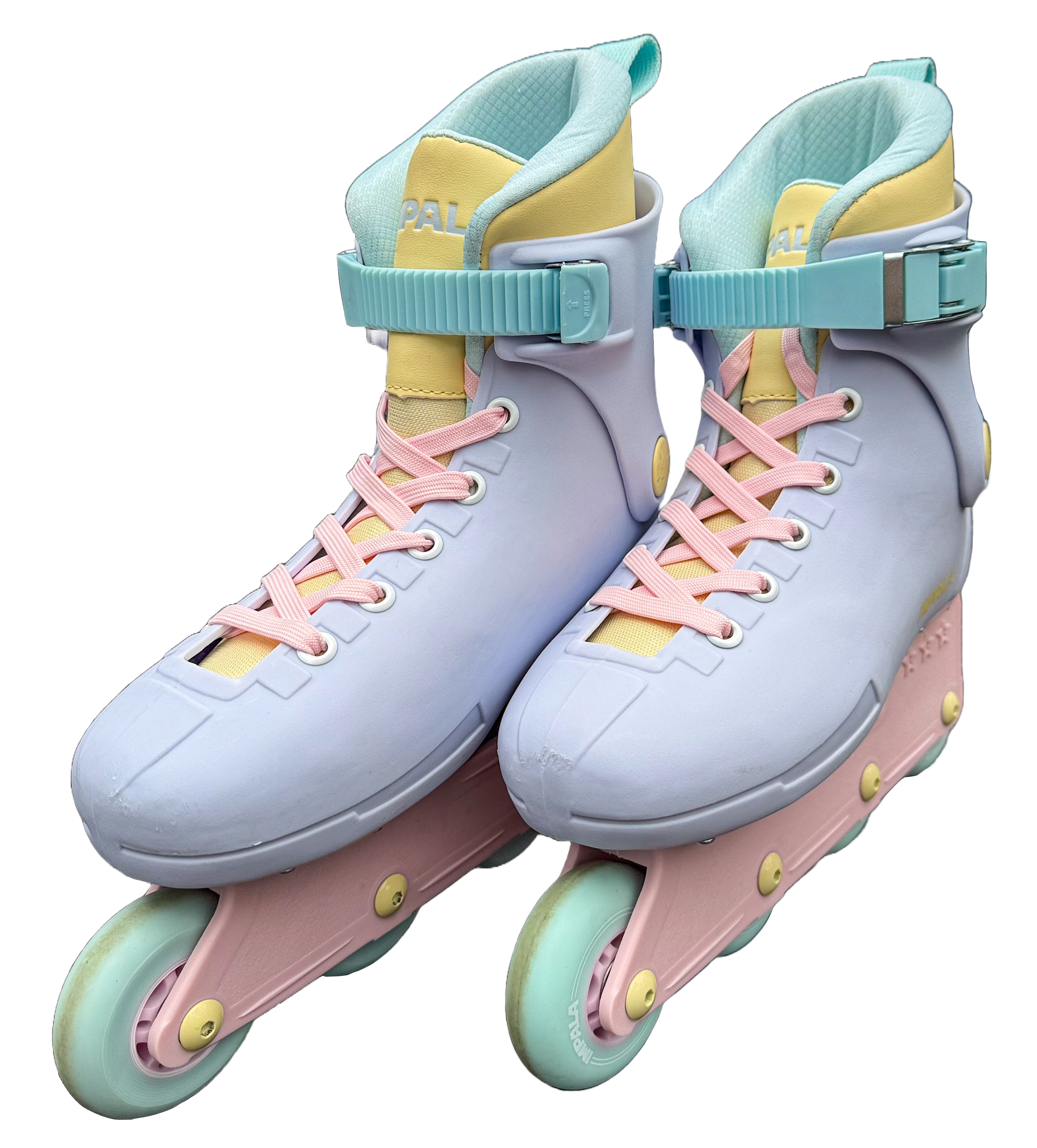
Recreational skates

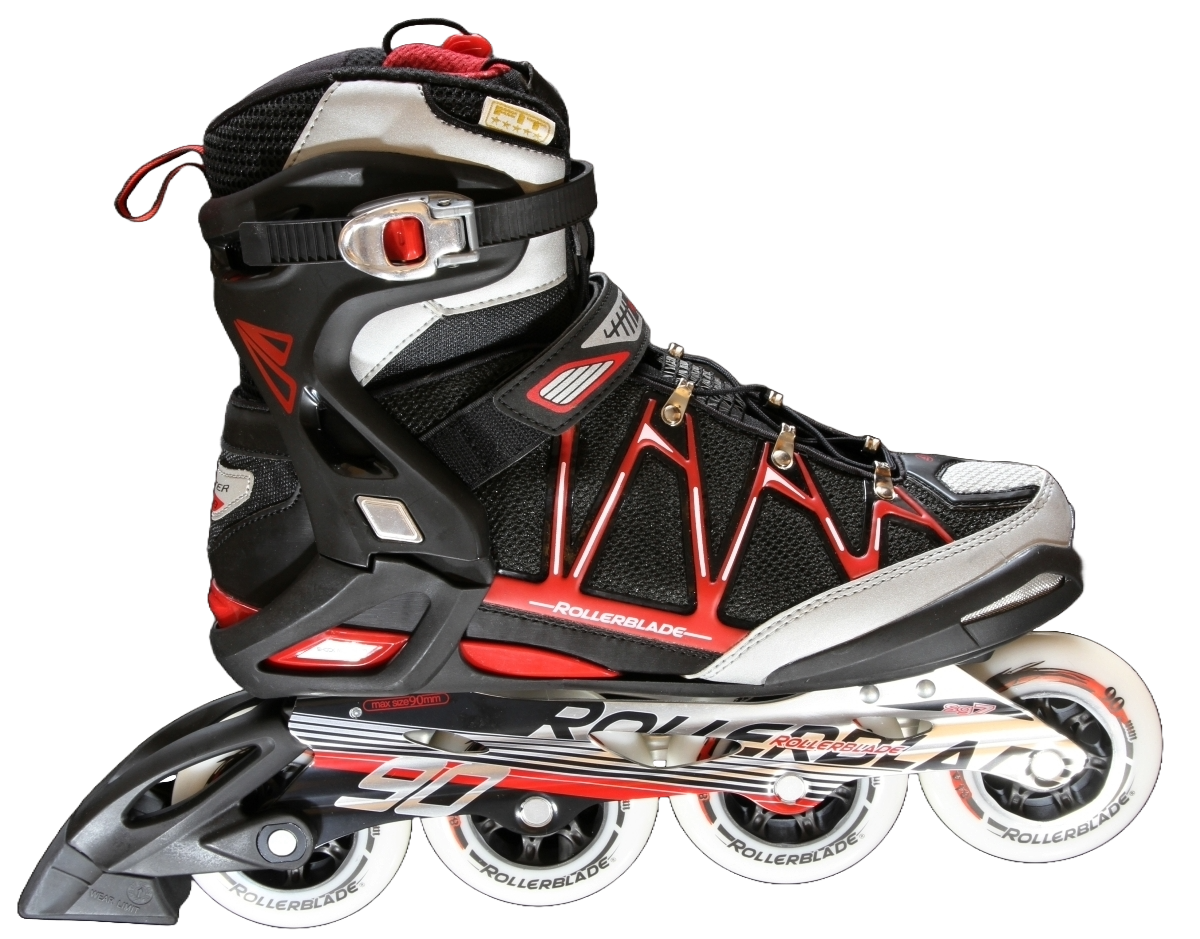
Fitness skates

Some makers refer to recreational skates as "fitness skates". Others split them into two or more categories: recreational, fitness, and cross-training. Usually, the fitness and cross-training categories reflect increasing cost and thus quality of skates. (Note: See catalog pages from various makers and resellers in Jan 2025, for wildly different ways they classify recreational, fitness and cross-training skates: Rollerblade (archived), Powerslide (archived), Roces (archived), K2 (archived), and Inline Warehouse (archived). See Ivo Vegter's Youtube video on the classifications of recreational skates.) Soft boots with an exoskeleton are usually the least expensive. Hard boots with removable liners are often priced higher. Hybrid boots with an endoskeleton are high-end models.

This category can be better understood as "unspecialized" inline skates, or generic skates. All other types of skates can be thought of as specialized deviations from this basic type. Recreational skates usually come with four wheels of average size, and a frame of average length, which is just slightly longer than the boot. This places the front wheel halfway ahead of the toe box, and the rear wheel halfway behind the heel pocket, a design that remained unchanged since Scott Olson's adoption of Super Sport Skate from 1979. Recreational skates are equipped with heel brakes. These allow beginners to learn to stop rolling, with a simple pivot of a foot on its heel.

=== Aggressive ===
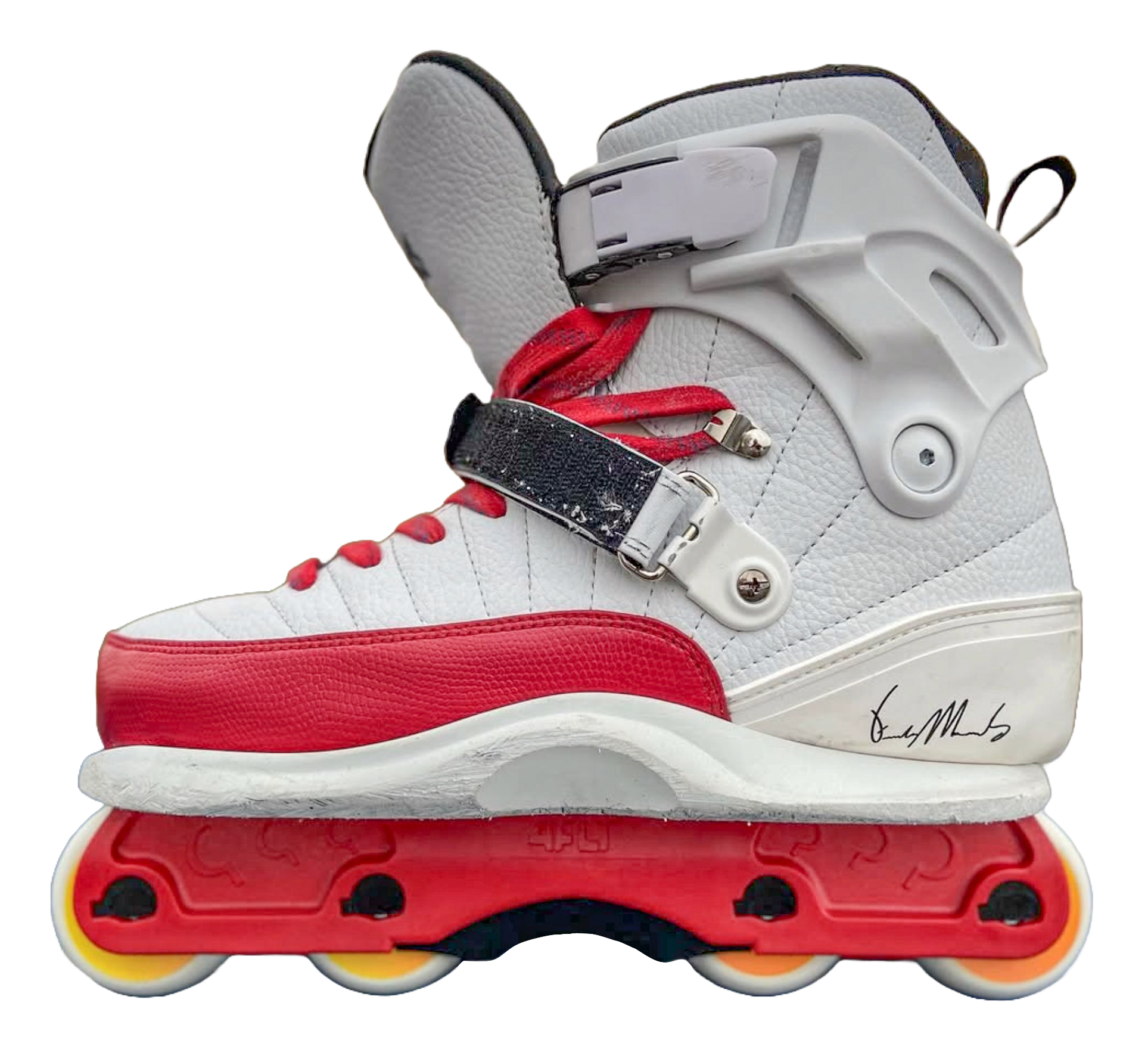
Aggressive skates

Aggressive skates are the most specialized inline skates, in contrast to recreational skates. They are designed for one specific purpose only: grinds. Grinding is the art of sliding on street obstacles such as stairs, rails, benches, curbs, ramps and walls. To support these stunts, aggressive skates are generally built with strong hard boots based on plastic ski boots and bolted to thick frames which are fitted with the smallest wheels in all of inline skating. To help a skater lock onto an obstacle of interest during a grind, an aggressive skate provides channels and surfaces such as H-blocks, frame grooves, backslide grooves, grind plates, soulplates, etc. Transitioning between these stunts, a skater often jumps considerable heights, or rides down a long flight of stairs (known as stair bashing). Thus, aggressive boots are often fitted with shock absorbers to dampen shocks upon landing.

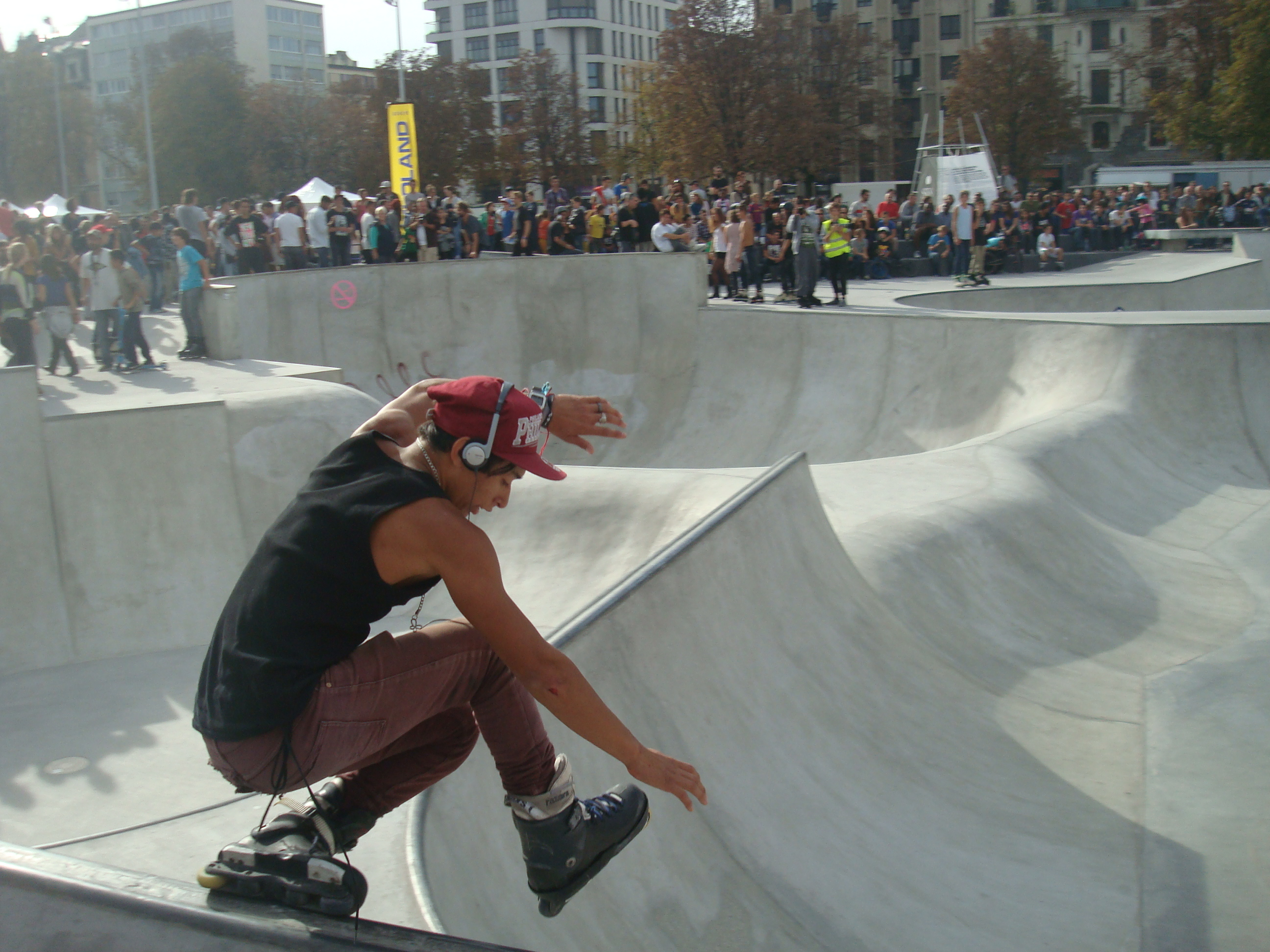
Park skating competition

Rollerblade Lightning TRS has been widely credited for enabling aggressive inline skating as a sport, with its durable boot and its nylon-reinforced frame. Aggressive skates co-evolved with the discipline which started as "inline stunts". It then turned into "streetstyle skating", and finally into "aggressive inline skating". The word "street" in "street-style" meant that skaters performed tricks on and over "street obstacles", following nomenclature from skateboarding. Skaters grind on street obstacles (termed "street skating"), perform stunts at skateparks (termed "park skating"), and take to the air at the top of vert ramps (termed "vert skating").

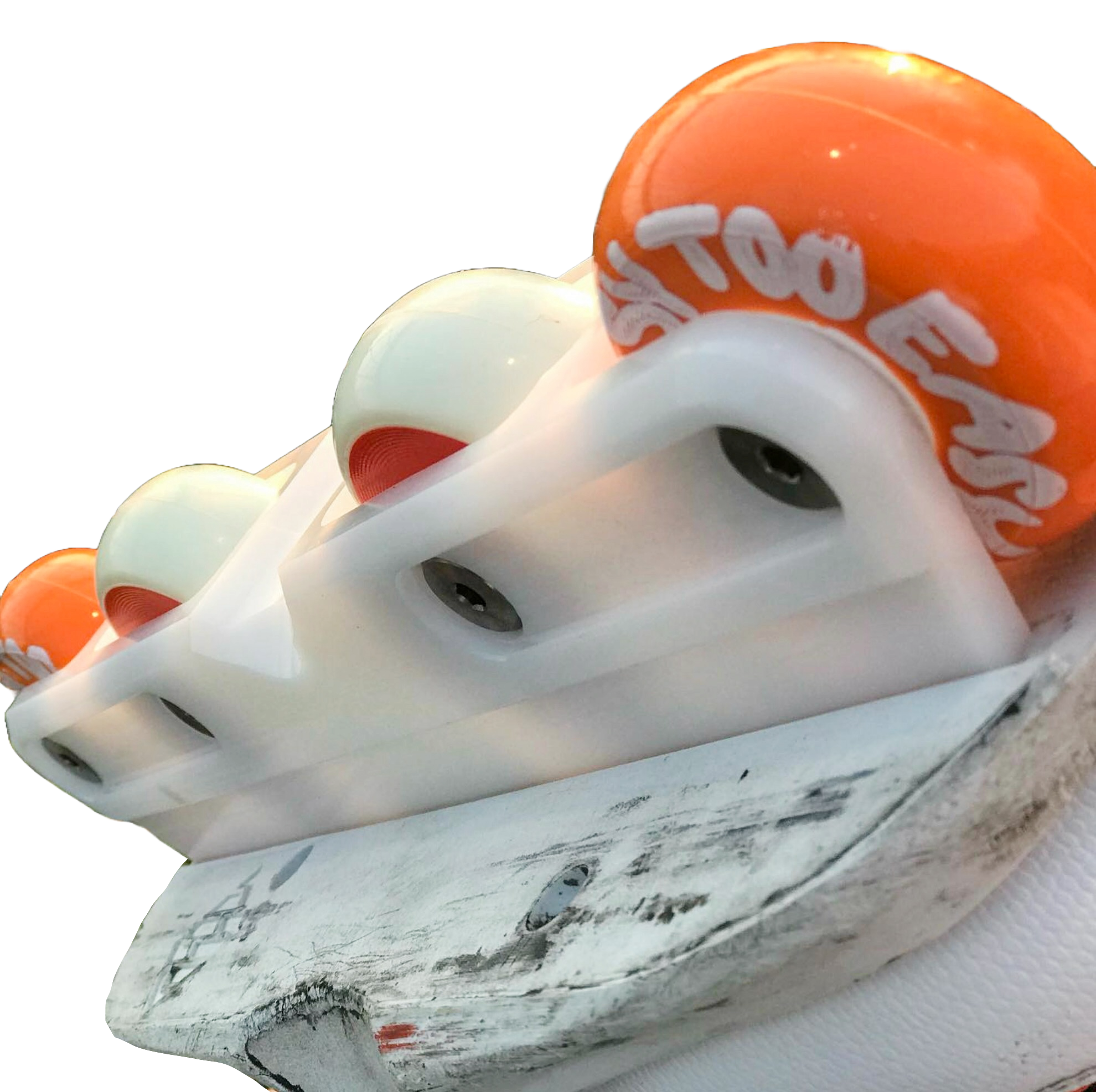
Frame groove and thick frame walls

Aggressive skates have standardized on UFS, the Universal Frame System. Most UFS frames accommodate small wheels up to 60 mm. Some UFS frames with frame grooves and H-blocks are designed with thick walls to prevent wheel bites. allowing them to be used with a flat wheel setup. Other UFS frames without prevention measures against wheel bites can be set up with an anti-rocker wheel setup, with even smaller and harder grindwheels (or antirockers) in the middle. Some skaters go one step further, replacing the two middle wheels with non-rotating "juice blocks".

The name "aggressive" has been controversial. Many in the community call aggressive skating "rollerblading" (or simply "blading"), and thus members "bladers". Others call it "aggro". (Note: Page 77 of Skaters magazine from 1990 featured an ad by Rollerblade on "Aggro Culture", an alternative term for aggressive inline skating. It urged readers to send $4 for an "Aggro Culture Poster". It's not clear whether Rollerblade promoted this term beyond 1990.) Some skate manufacturers eschew the label "aggressive", choosing to market their aggressive skates instead as "street skates" or "park skates". (Note: See archived product pages from Rollerblade: 2011 page showing a selection of Rollerblade "Street Skates", 2016 selection, and 2024 selection.)

=== Hockey ===
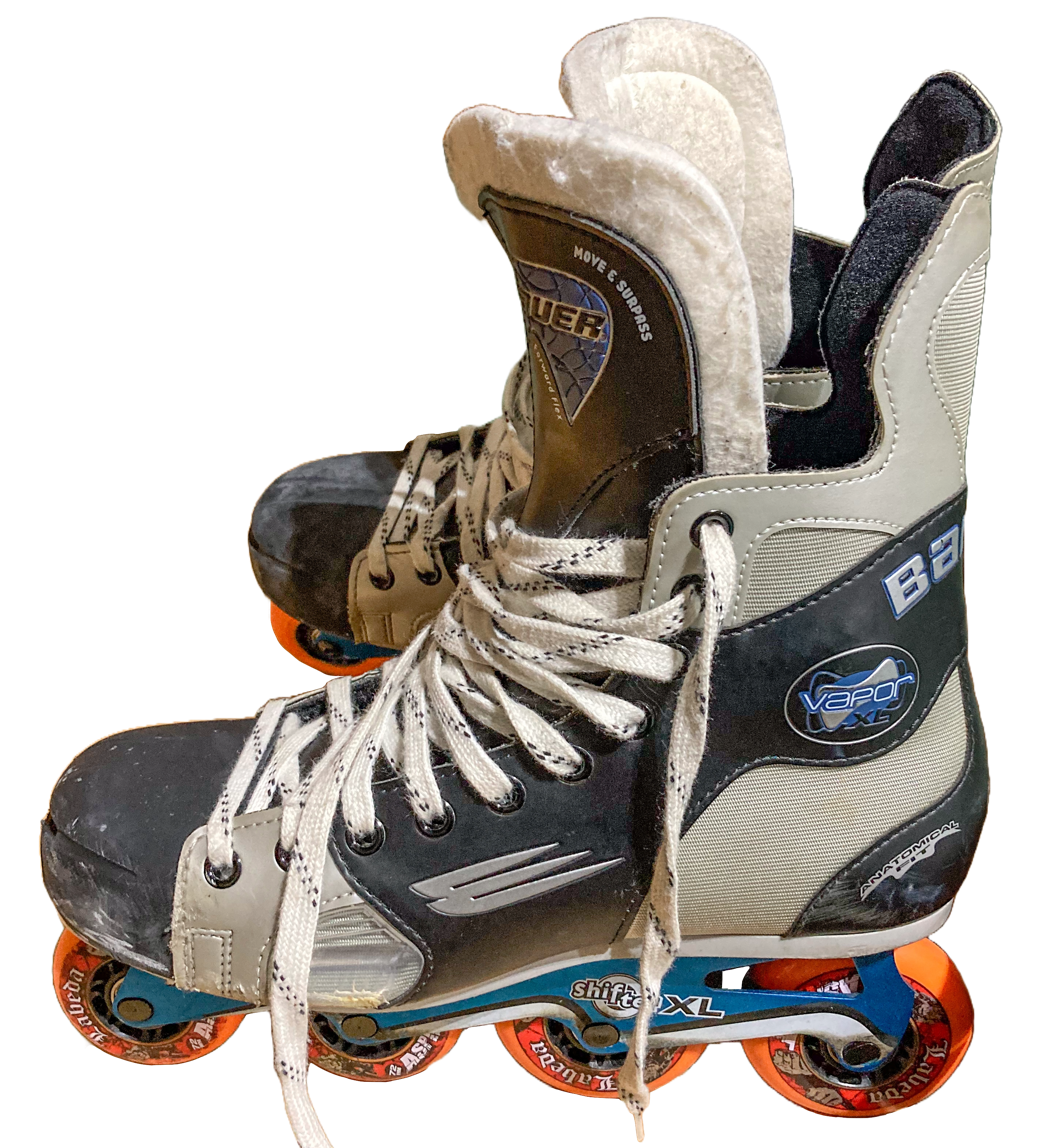
Bauer hockey skate

In the 21st century, the boots used for inline hockey skates (or roller hockey skates) are constructed using a process that differs significantly from those of other inline skates. They are primarily produced by ice hockey manufacturers such as CCM, Bauer (Mission), True, and Marsblade. (Note: See inline hockey skates made by ice hockey manufacturers, archived here: CCM Super Tacks 9370R, Bauer Vapor 3X Pro, Mission Inhaler WM02, True TF9 Roller Hockey Skate, and Marsblade R1 Kraft Crew.) In many cases, the same boot is used across both sports, with either a blade holder for ice hockey, or an inline frame for roller hockey. (Note: Refer to this video showing the production process of a Bauer hockey skate (both ice and inline), corresponding to the US patent 7,316,083. See FIG. 9: an exploded view showing components used in the construction of a traditional hockey skate in the 2010s.) (Note: See US patent 7,039,977 filed by Mission Hockey in 2003, showing the same hockey boot construction, mounted on an ice blade (FIG. 1), and on a wheeled frame (FIG. 2).) As a result, inline hockey skates continue to rely on the rivet-based mounting system used in ice hockey, even though replaceable frame standards have become common in other skate categories.

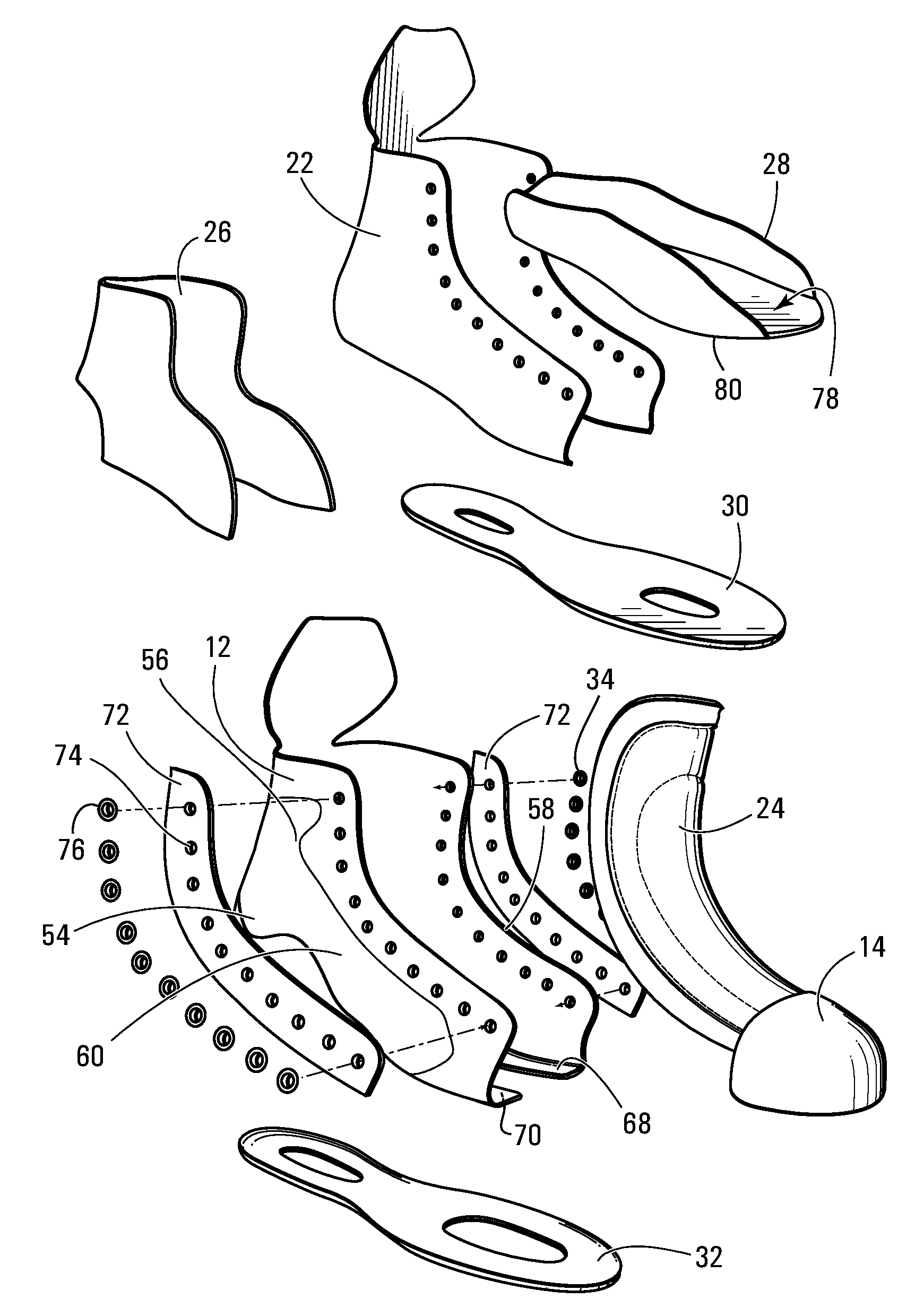
Hockey boot construction

Hockey skates feature some of the shortest frames among all inline skates, enabling players to make tight turns and perform crossovers without interference. Hockey boots are designed to sit as low to the ground as possible, limiting them to smaller wheels. This configuration maximizes stability for hard edging maneuvers. Wheels with a rounder profile are preferred, as they offer improved grip and control during sharp turns at all edging angles. Many hockey skates use a hi-lo wheel setup, with larger wheels in the rear and smaller ones in the front. This raises the heel and lowers the toe cap, thus the name "hi-lo". It causes a player to forward flex naturally, for greater stability and stronger strokes.

The modern inline skate was originally created as a training substitute for ice hockey skates, featuring a boot with a hard shell, pivoting cuff, and removable liner. This style of boot construction remains popular across all inline disciplines, ironically with the exception of inline hockey. Instead, hockey boots have followed their own path. (Note: See background section discussion on why hard boots with hinged cuff and thick liners do not work to either ice hockey or roller hockey, in US patent 7,039,977 from Bauer/Mission.) They are built to be as lightweight as economically feasible while still delivering excellent heel and ankle support, along with protection against impacts from flying pucks. Direct and immediate power transfer from foot to wheel is also essential. To achieve this, hockey boots are constructed around an unyielding wall with anatomical contours to hug the heel and both sides of the ankle. This structure is called the "quarter package", made of left and right quarter panels bolted to a rigid outsole platform. The rest of the boot is built around this base, including a thick tongue that supports the shin in a forward-leaning athletic stance, and a reinforced toe cap. The liner is integrated into the boot and not removable, with strategically varied thickness for best anatomical fit. Hockey skates are secured with eyelets and laces, rather than buckles or straps.

=== Speed ===
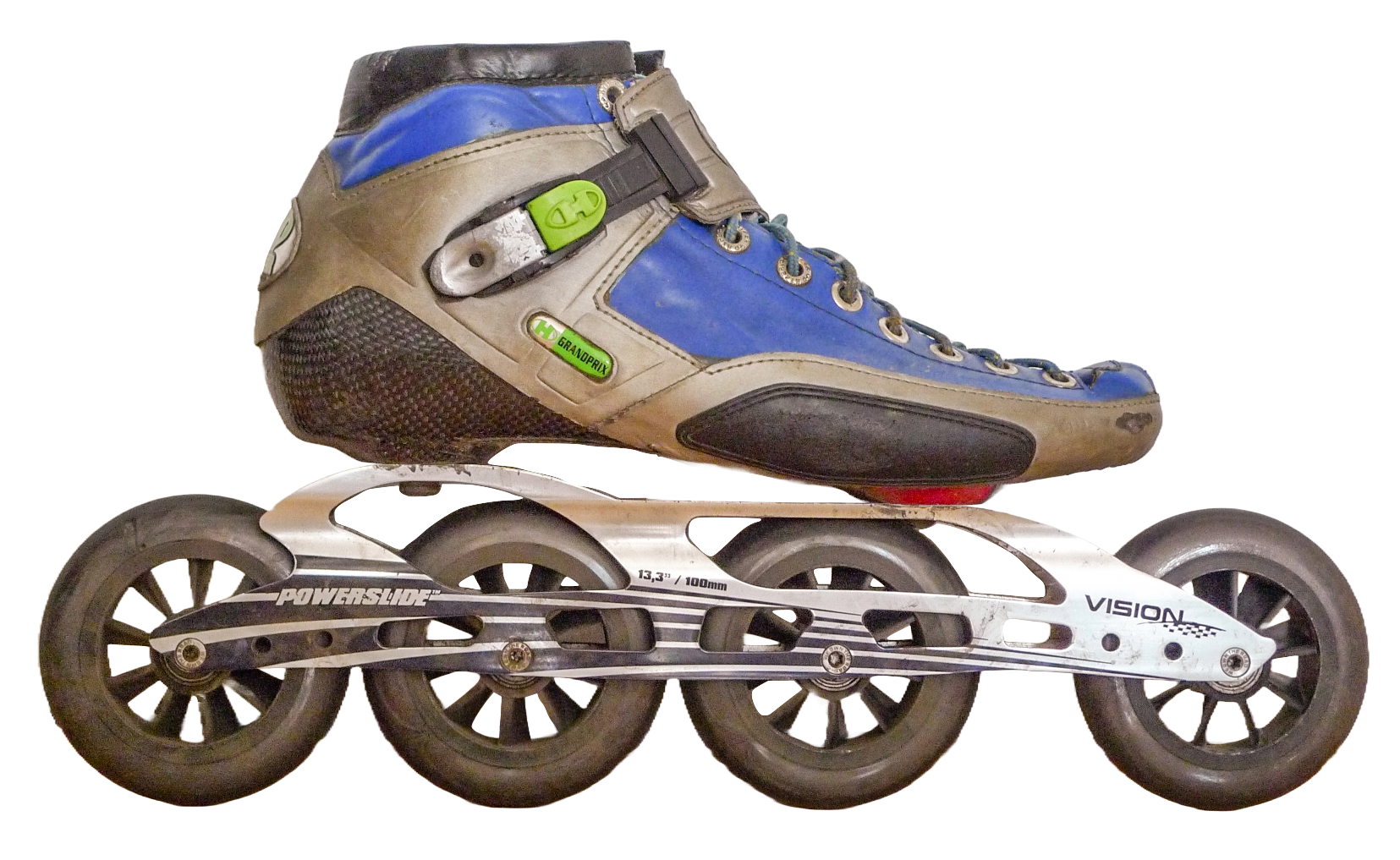
Speed skate with 100/90 mm wheels

Speed skates (or race skates) are purpose-built inline skates with a single goal: speed. They enable a racer to stride with maximal efficiency and to glide with the least amount of friction. Joey Mantia holds the world record for the outdoor 10-kilometers at over 27 miles per hour.

Speed skating differs from other inline disciplines in that a speed skater tilts her body trunk forward for up to 60° when racing, to reduce air resistance. A speed skater bends her knees aggressively for up to 80° in a deep-seated squatting position which requires a deep forward leaning of the shin (dorsiflexion) for proper balance. This deep squatting posture produces the most powerful push-offs, with the farthest displacement of the pushing skate.

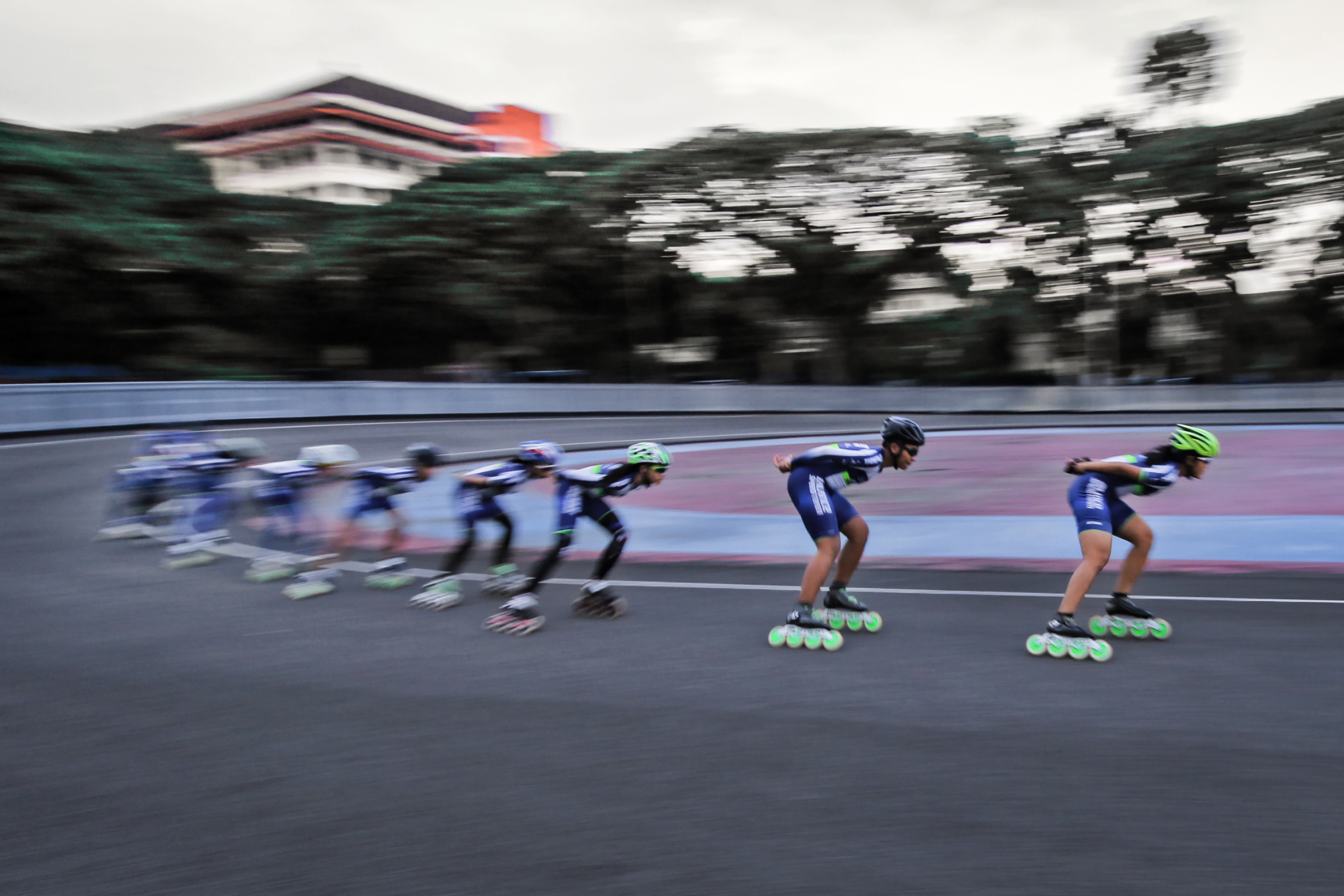
Inline racing

Because of the need for a deep dorsiflexion, speed skates have no eyelets, buckles, or straps above middle eyelets at 45° angle. In order for racers to freely flex their foot around ankle bones, speed boots are cut the lowest among all inline skates, around or below the ankle bones. The removal of shaft and cuff significantly reduces a boot's weight. Most speed boots are custom-fitted without much padding, or else heat-moldable, to prevent the foot from the slightest wobbling. (Note: Refer to this video showing the production process of a speed skate with a custom-molded carbon-fiber shell (both ice and inline).)

The frame may be made of aircraft-quality aluminum, magnesium, or possibly lightweight carbon fiber, such that it flexes very little and transmits power from the foot to the wheels more directly. The length and height of a frame determine the number and size of wheels it can accommodate. More wheels and bigger wheels increase mass, making acceleration harder and slower. But once rolling at speed, a skater can more easily maintain top speed given the rotational inertia. In the 21st century, wheel size ranges from 90 mm to 125 mm. A setup with four 110 mm wheels (4x110mm) is typical for competitive speed skating, and three 125 mm wheels (3x125mm) for marathon skates at marathon events. Speed skates generally adopt either the 165mm or the 195mm mounting standard. Both of these 2-point mounting standards feature a built-in heel raise that pitches a skater forward, creating forward flex.

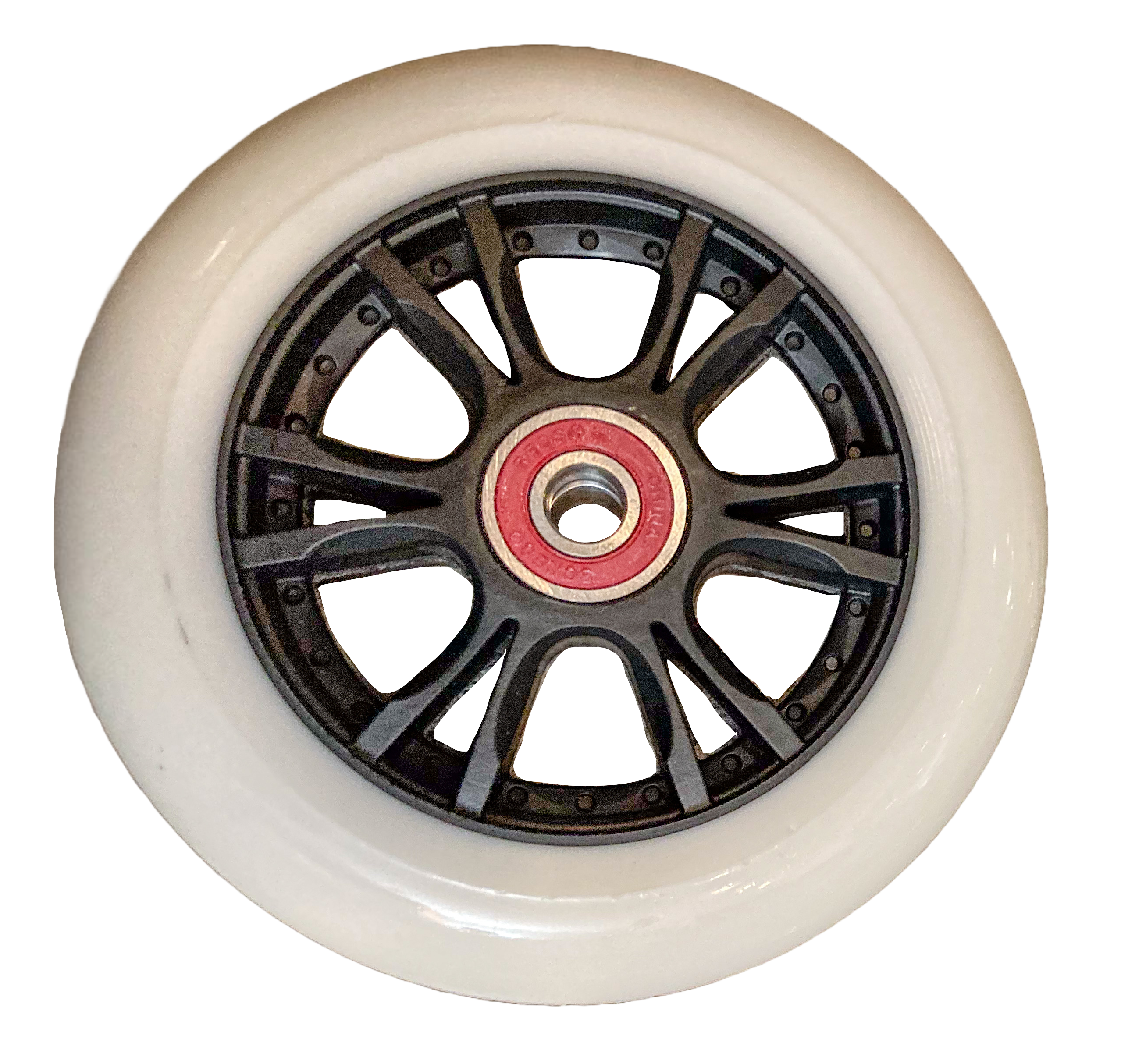
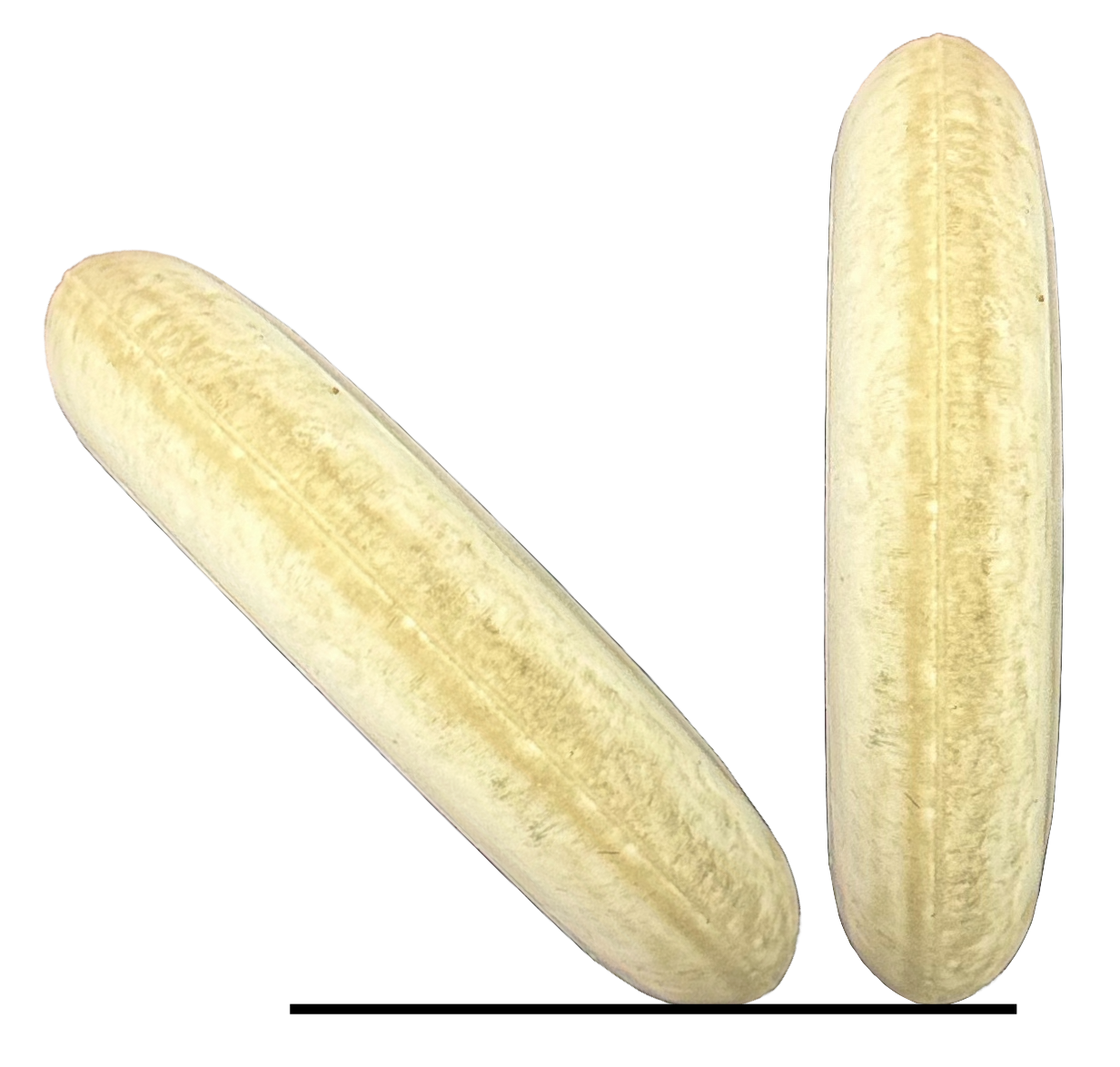
Bullet profile: striding vs gliding

Speed skating generally adopts harder and high-rebound wheels to minimize energy lost to elastic hysteresis. Speed wheels have a pointy bullet profile that reduces friction from drags when gliding upright, while still providing a large contact surface for improved traction and control when pushing off at a deep edging angle. Speed skaters use High-quality bearings with precision ratings, and perform regular cleaning and lubrication to remove trapped dirt and restore them to their optimal performance.

=== Urban ===
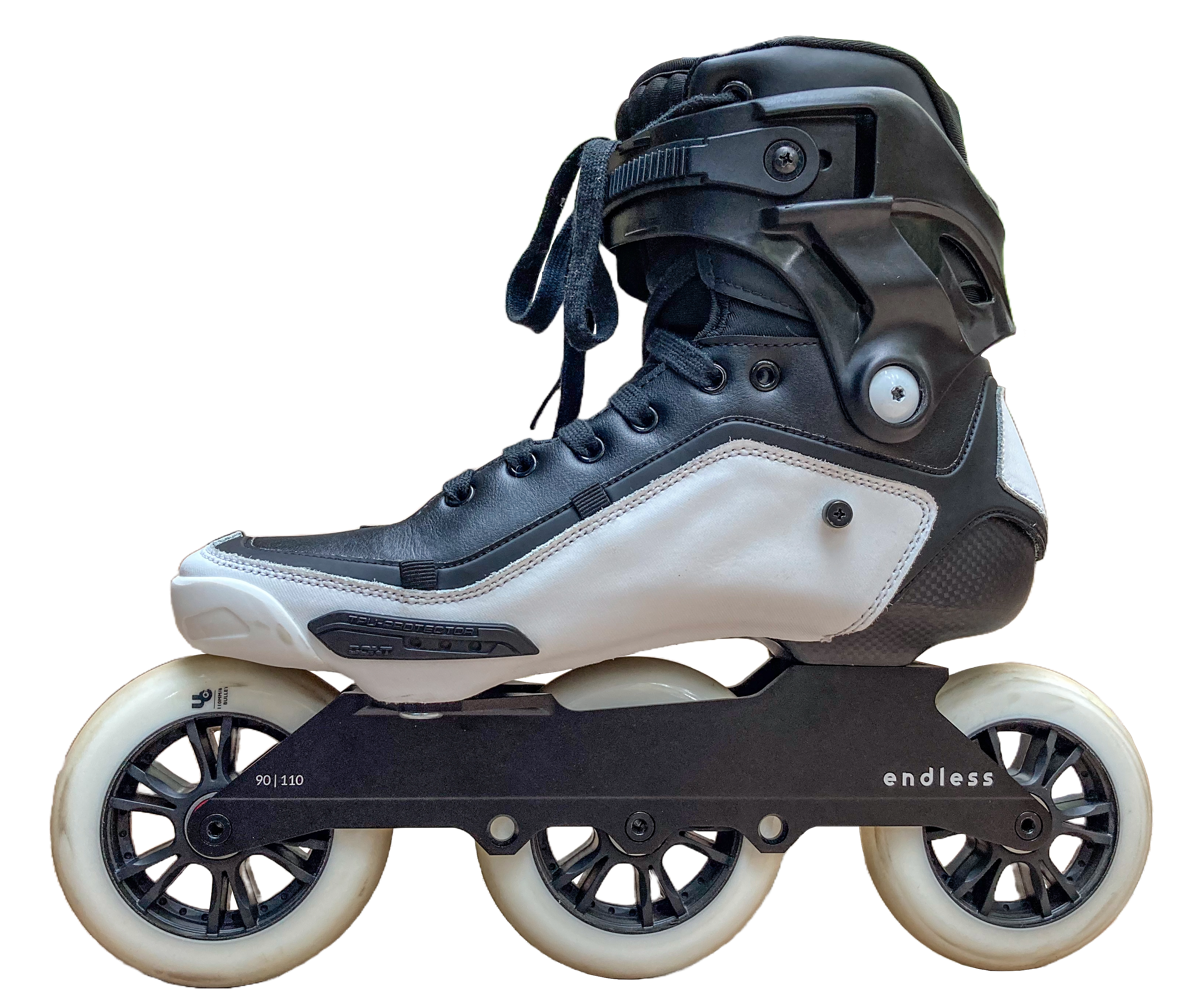
Urban skate with 3 big wheels

Urban skate is an umbrella term for a type of skate suitable for several niche inline disciplines: freestyle skating, slalom skating, wizard skating, city commuting, and urban skating. These activities take place on relatively flat ground, but the surface may not always be paved or smooth.

Freestyle skating is named after its counterpart in skateboarding, just like aggressive street, park, and vert skating are named after street, park, and vert skateboarding, respectively. Freestyle skating is the art of performing skating tricks on relatively flat ground, free of obstacles. Freestyle slalom skating is a form of freestyle skating where tricks are performed around slalom cones. This is standardized by the International Freestyle Skaters Association (IFSA) and World Skate as "freestyle slalom" to distinguish it from "speed slalom", which is a form of speed skating around cones on flat ground. Freestyle skating requires skates that support rigorous turning and edging maneuvers, with characteristics similar to hockey skates. A rockered setup with 76-80 mm wheels on a relatively short frame is common for freestyle skating.

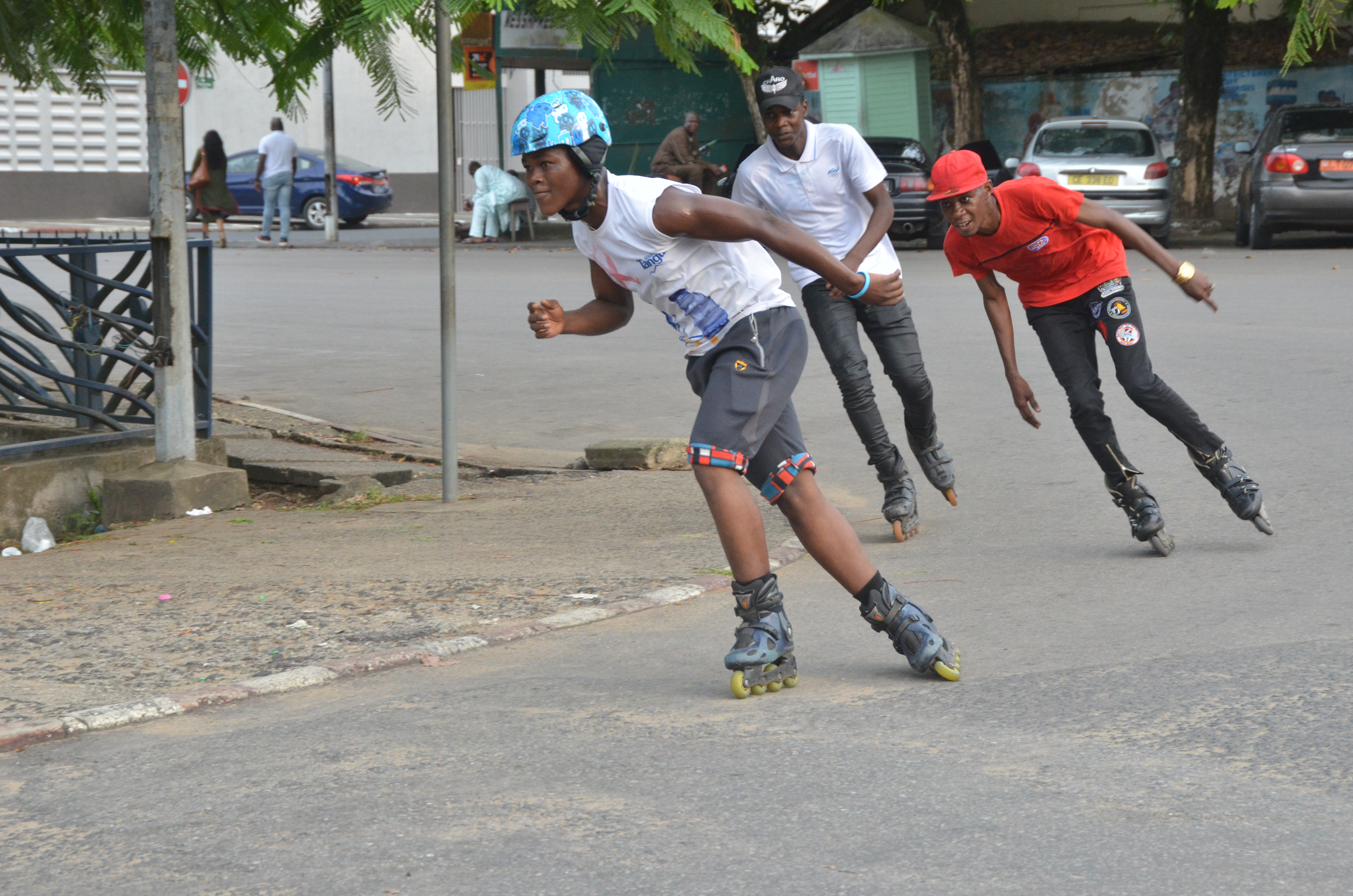
Urban skating in Bonanjo

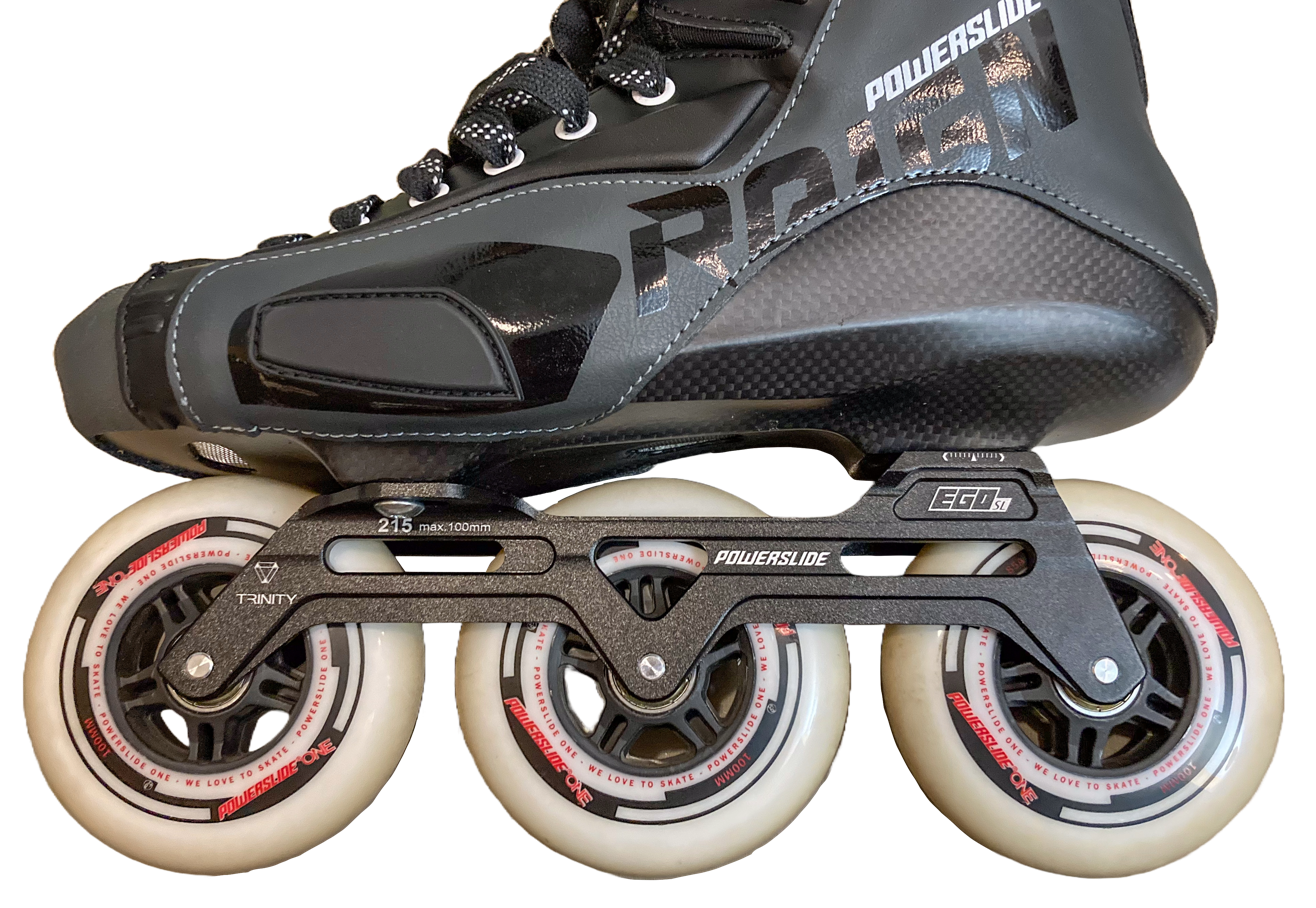
Heel-to-toe drop on a Trinity frame

Urban skating, also known as "city commuting", takes the activity to the street. But the term "street skating" is widely used to describe a subdiscipline of aggressive skating, for grinding on street obstacles. Thus, this niche market is variously promoted as skating on paved roads or commuting to work on skates. These activities demand longer frames and larger wheels for higher cruising speed, stable tracking, and more comfortable rides on uneven surfaces, similar to speed skates for marathon events. Common wheel setups include 4x80mm, 4x90mm, 4x100mm, 3x100mm, 3x110mm, and 3x125mm. Most urban skate boots support either the 165mm or Trinity mounting standard, and can be customized with a short frame and average-sized wheels for slalom skating, or with a long frame and large wheels for long-distance road skating. Both the 165mm and Trinity mounting standards raise the heel mounting platform higher than the toe, creating a slight "heel-to-toe drop", also known as a heel raise. This drop causes the skater to lean forward by default, simulating a subtle forward flex similar in purpose to the hi-lo wheel setup used in hockey skates.

Wizard skating is named after the company Wizard Skating, founded by Leon Basin in 2014. This form of skating is characterized by flowing footwork from freestyle, slalom, and figure skating, while a skater blazes through roads, rolls over curbs, skates up ramps, bashes down stairs, and parkours on walls. Leon perfected a type of "wizard" skate for this sport, featuring a long frame, large wheels, and a pre-rockered wheel setup for either 4 wheels or 5 wheels. Skaters increasingly refer to this style as "flow skating".

== Boots ==
=== Hard boots ===
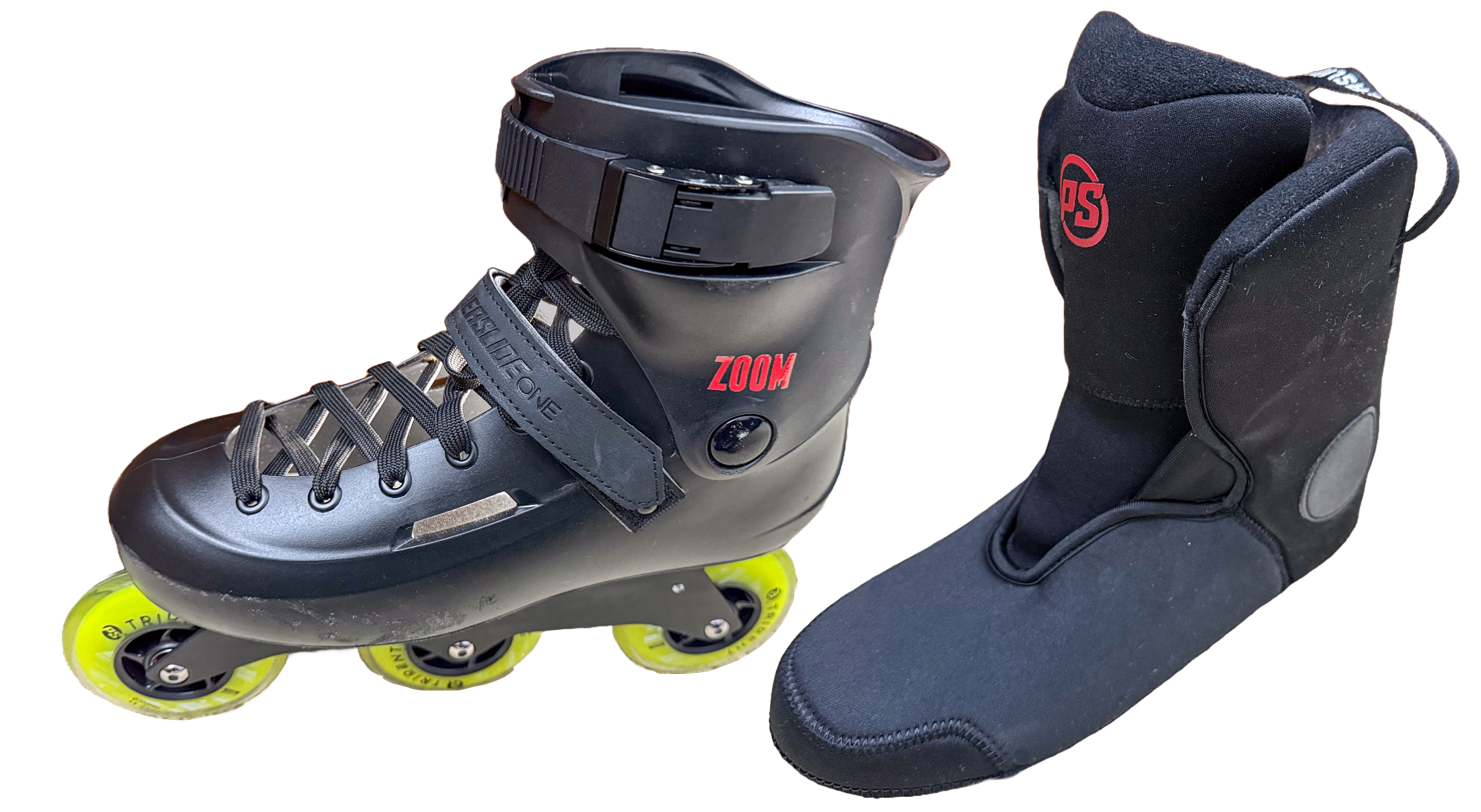

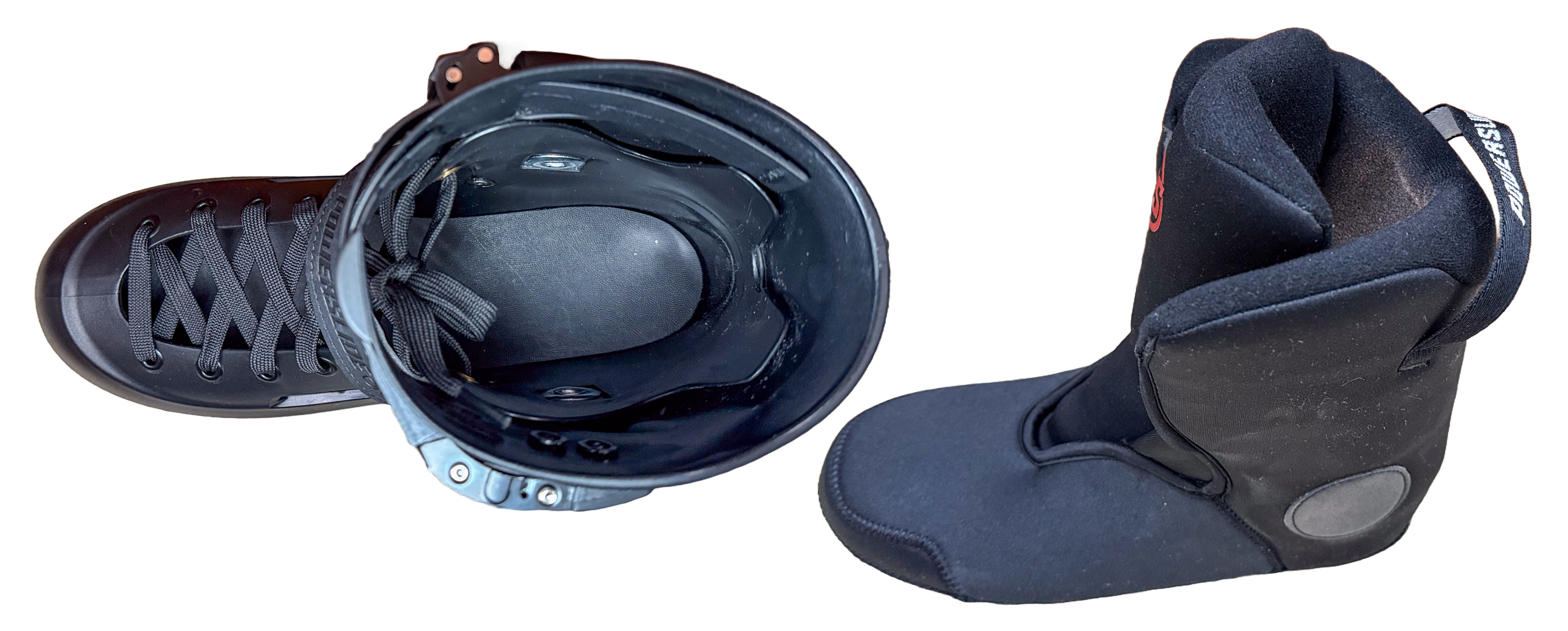
Hard boot with pivoting cuff, top buckle, 45° velcro strap, laced front facing, and removable liner

Hard boots dominated the inline skate market in the 1980s and 1990s at the inception of modern inline skating, and traced their design back to plastic ski boots from Lange. They have an outer shell made of plastic, fiberglass, carbon fiber, or other solid materials. A removable liner in a hard boot provides a snug yet comfortable fit between a skater's foot and the hard shell.

Hard boots commonly use a combination of velcro straps and plastic buckles as closures. The cuff is usually secured with a top buckle. Some boots use laces on the facing of the boot, while others have a front strap (or buckle) instead of or in addition to laces. The front lace and top buckle secure the foot inside the boot. To achieve proper heel lock, the liner is shaped to fit the heel, and a 45° strap (or buckle) presses the instep of the foot against the contour of the liner.

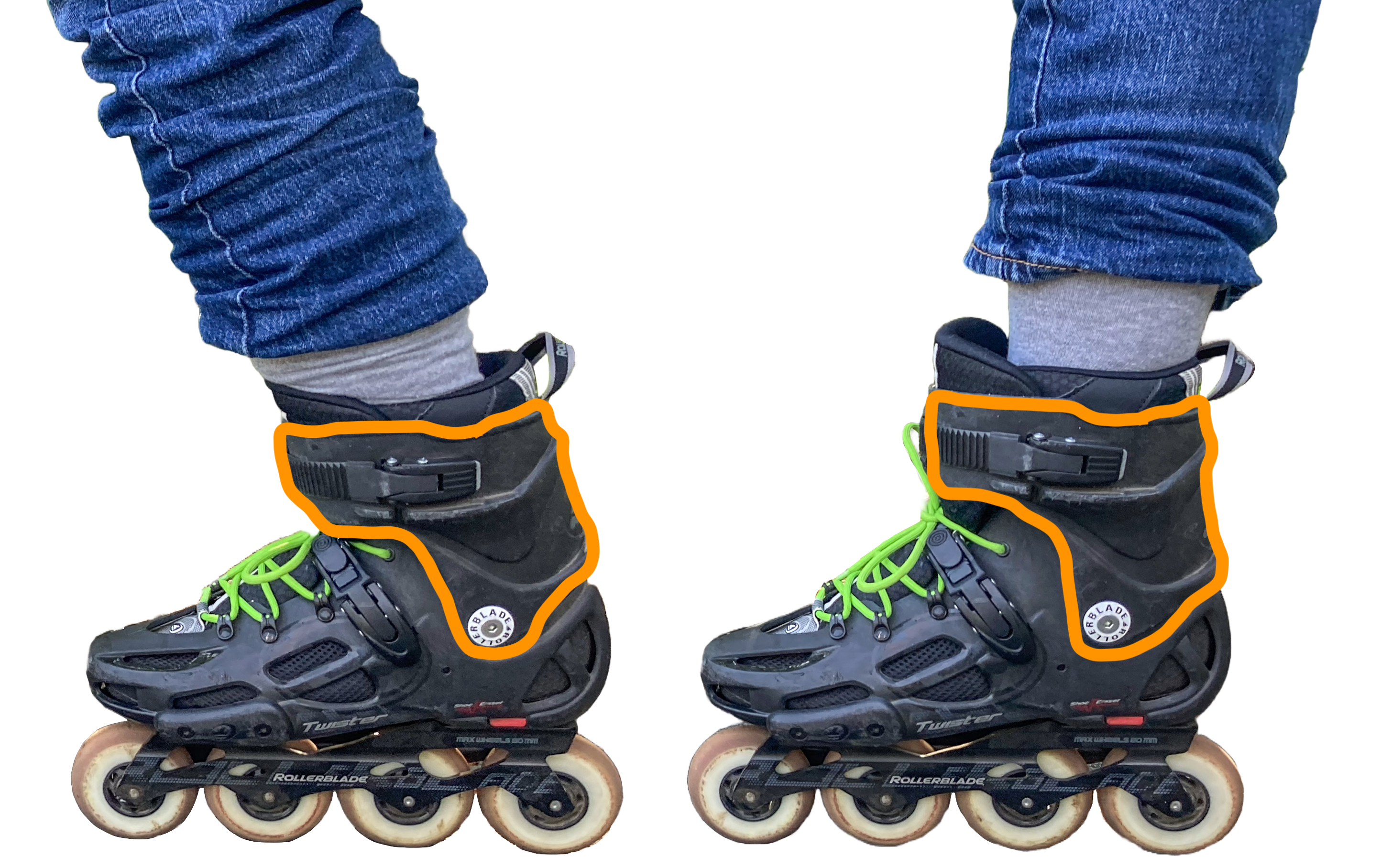
Hinged cuff: dorsiflexion (left) vs leg extended straight (right)

Hard boots have a high cuff (or shaft) to provide proper ankle support. In order to accommodate dorsiflexion, the cuff is made to pivot near the ankle bones. As a skater leans their shin forward, the hinged cuff rotates to follow the lower leg while continuing to provide lateral ankle support.

Molds used in plastic injection molding are expensive to make. As a result, plastic hard boots are usually available only in so-called "dual sizes". One hard shell is made for two US and EU shoe sizes (e.g. US 9-10, and EU 42–43). A thicker liner is provided for US 9 and EU 42 to fill the gaps, while a thinner liner is provided for US 10 and EU 43. Some manufacturers offer "dual fit" liners, where the same liner can accommodate two shoe sizes using elastic parts, memory foam, and other compressible space-filling materials.

=== Soft boots ===
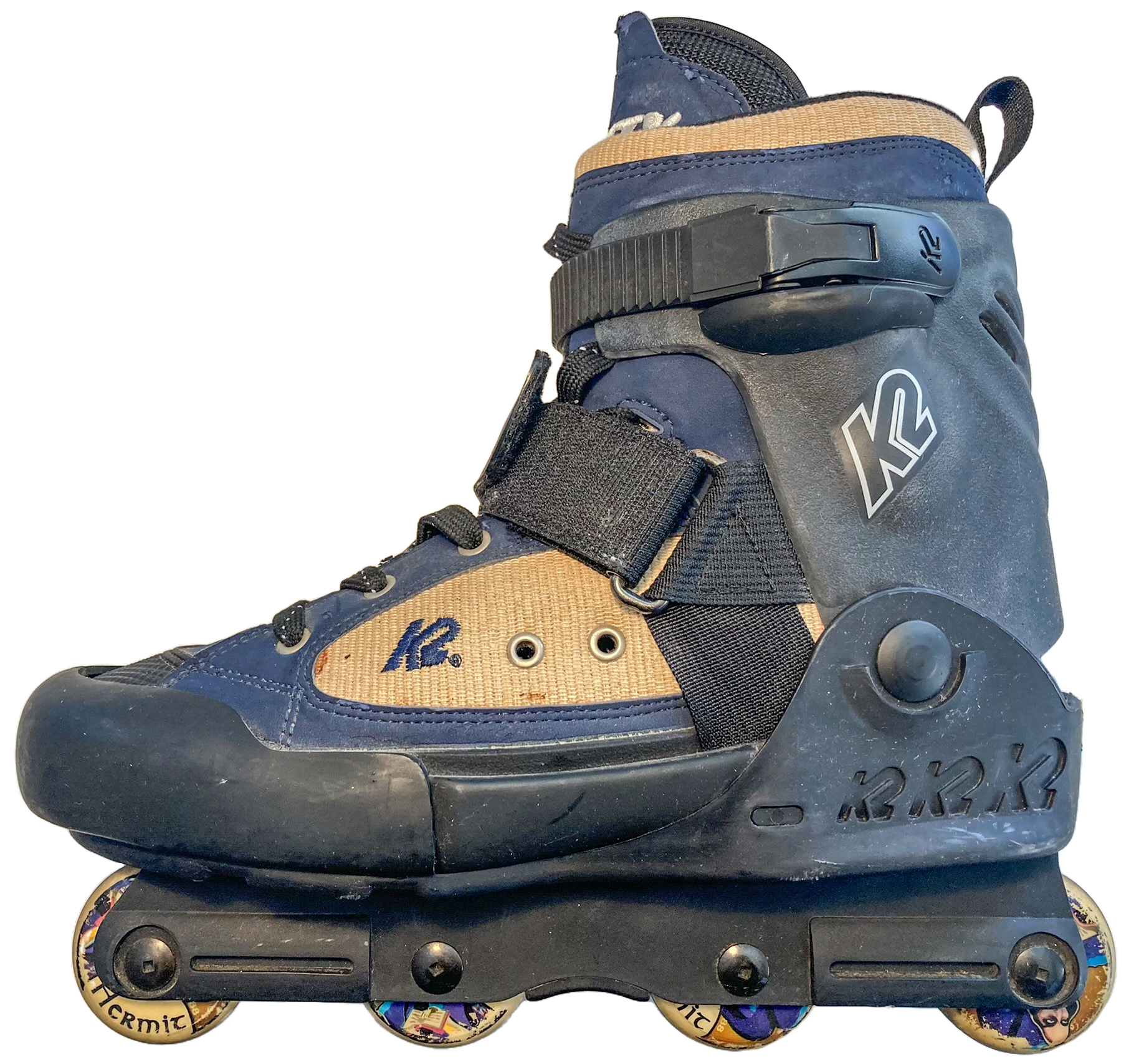
K2 Fatty SC, 1997

K2 introduced soft boots to inline skating in 1993 with its Exotech line of recreational skates, marking the company's entry into the sport. Building on this innovation, K2 later released the legendary K2 Fatty, an aggressive skate featuring the same soft-boot design. Since then, similar soft boots have come to dominate the recreational skate market.

They are akin to hiking shoes, made of textiles, mesh, neoprene, and other soft materials. Liners are integrated into the soft boot, and are thus not removable or replaceable. A soft boot is reinforced in strategic areas with a plastic exoskeleton for structural support.

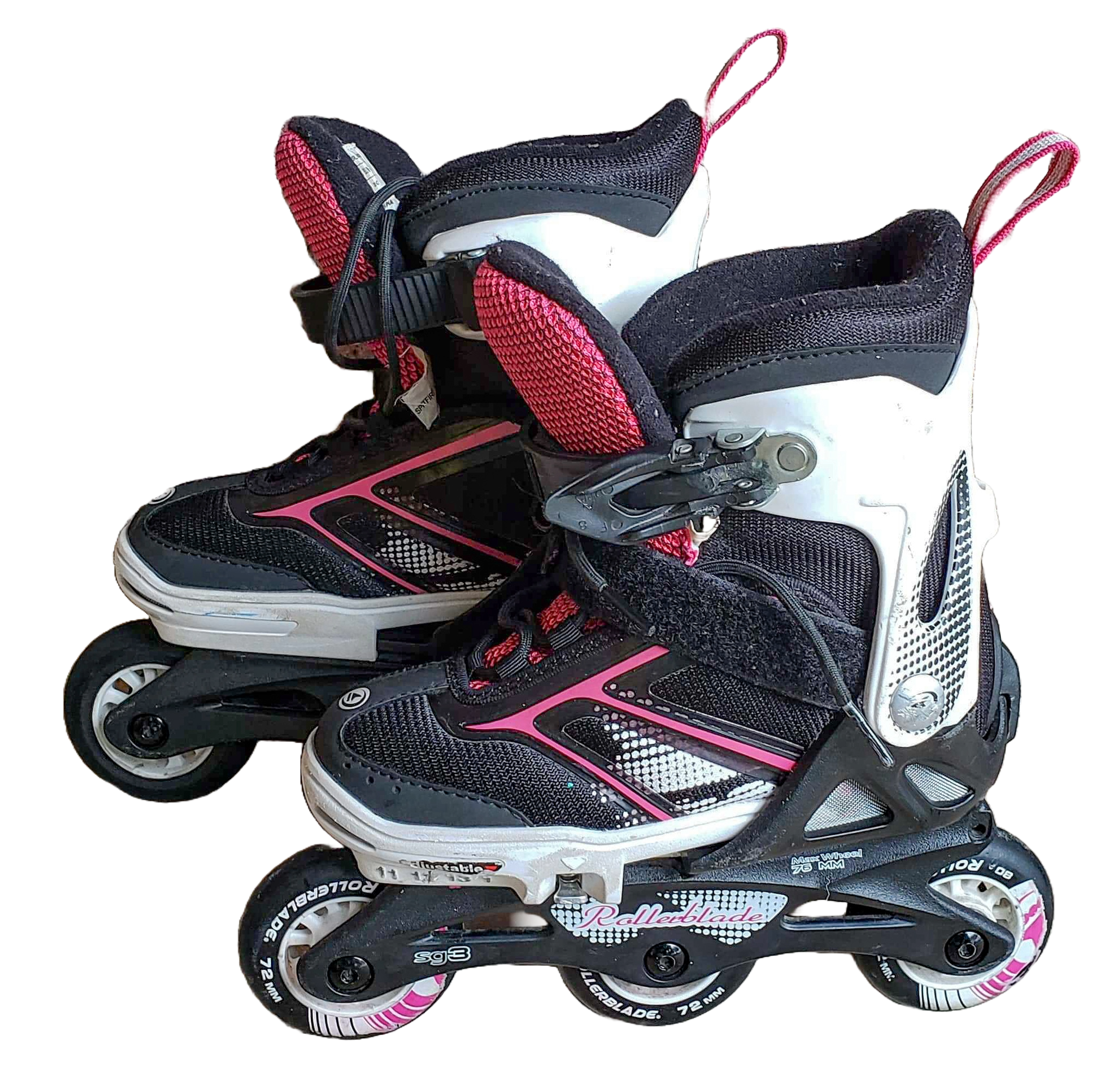
Rollerblade soft boots

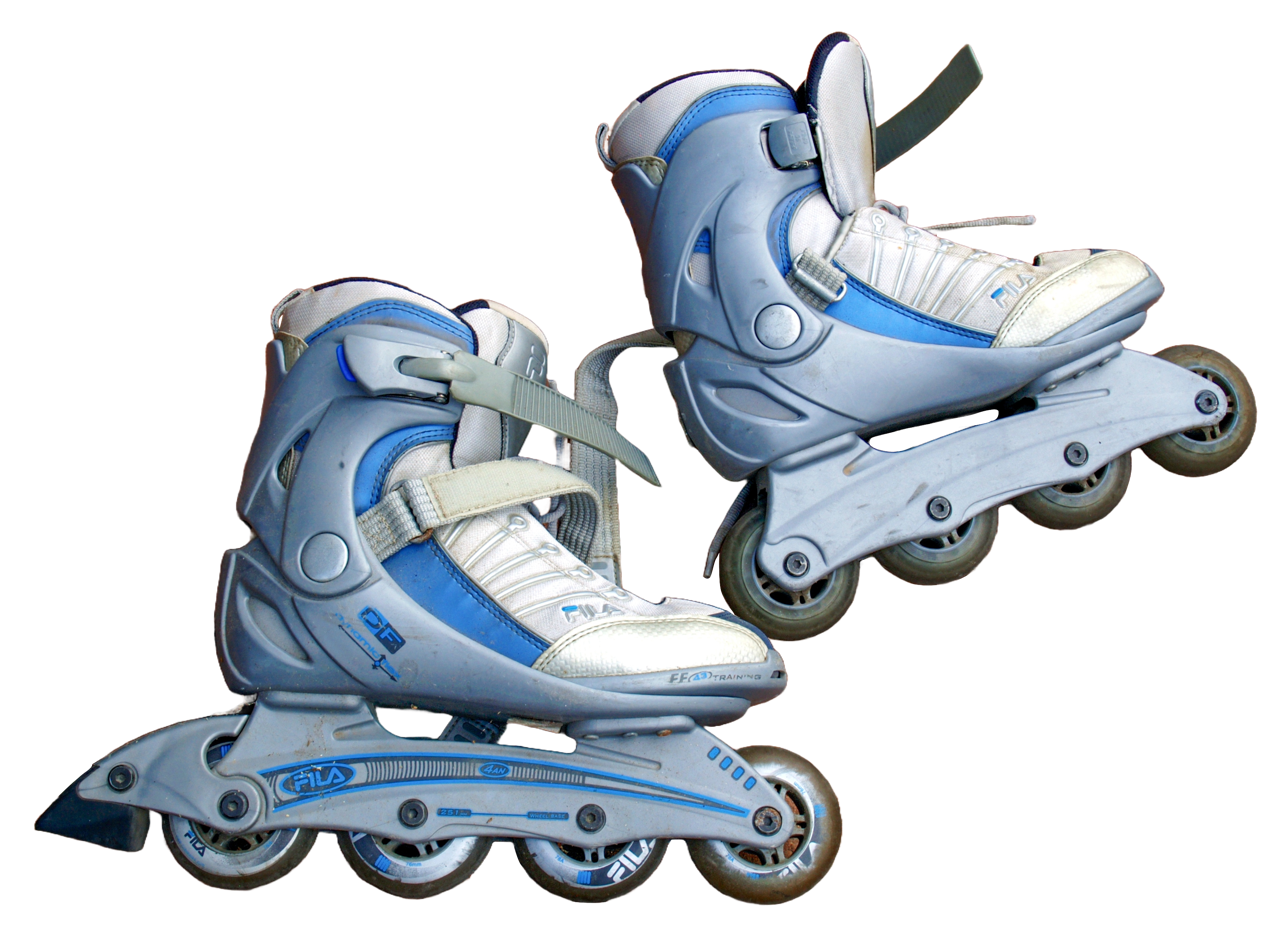
Fila soft boots

A soft boot uses a pivoting cuff to support the lower leg, like hard boots. Otherwise, its exoskeleton covers only a small area of the foot. This allows the boot to provide passive airflow through its fabric for moisture extraction, to keep the foot cool.

Soft boots use closure systems similar to those of hard boots. These include laces, velcro straps, and plastic buckles. Lacing the front of the boot is key to securing the foot within the boot, due to the lack of exoskeleton support in this area. On the other hand, the flexible front of the boot readily accommodates different shapes of foot. Soft boots thus provide a more comfortable fit at the expense of reduced rigidity and support, making them suitable for beginners and casual skaters. Committed enthusiasts, however, generally avoid soft boots due to their lack of direct and immediate response to skating moves, a result of elastic hysteresis.

Soft boots are lighter and generally more affordable than hard boots. They are also easier to manufacture in precise shoe sizes. While hard boots typically come in "dual sizes", soft boots are available in "half sizes" for US shoe measurements (e.g., US 9.5, 10, and 10.5) and, in some cases, for EU sizes as well (e.g., EU 39.5, 40, and 40.5).

=== Hybrid boots ===
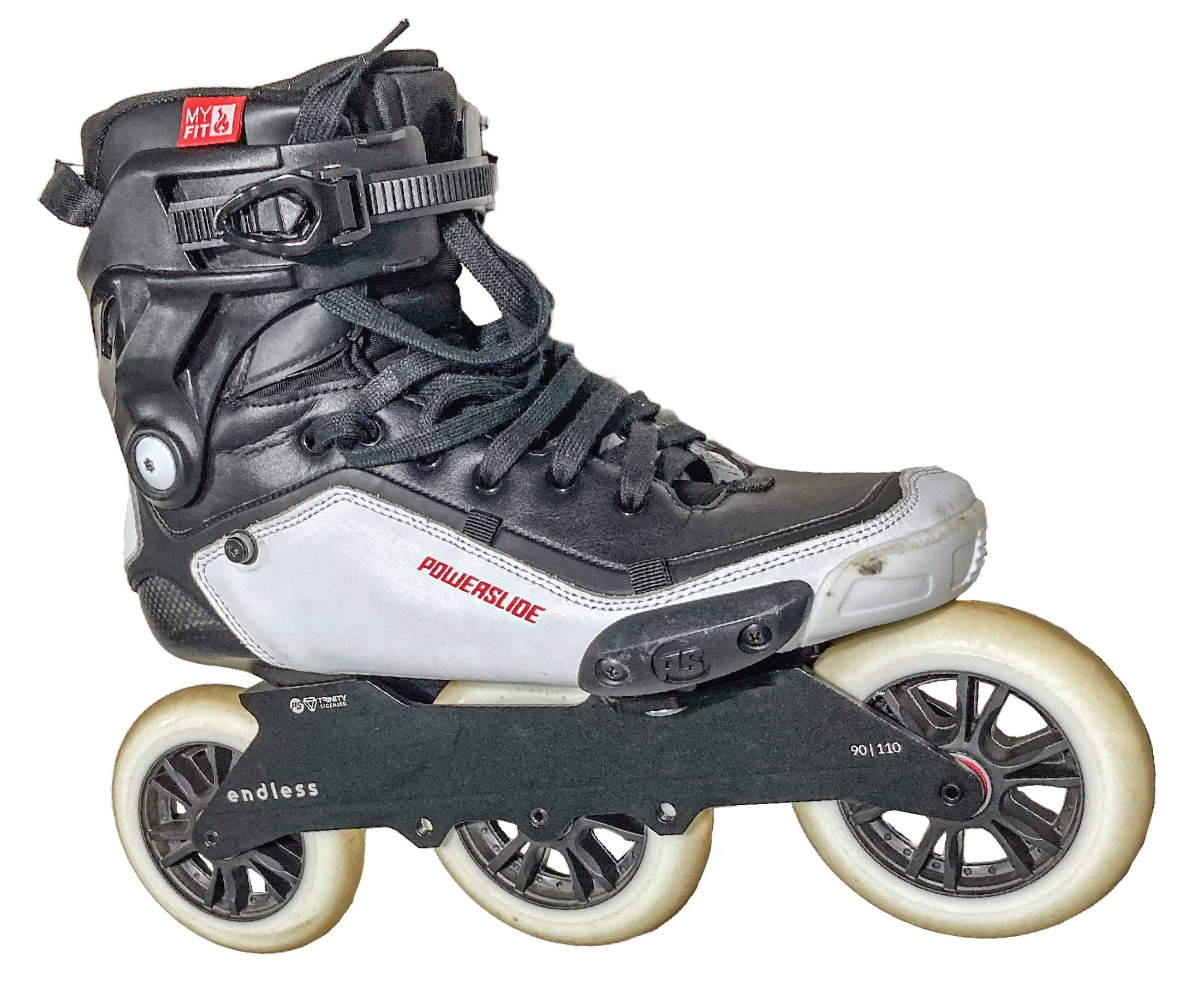
Hybrid soft boot

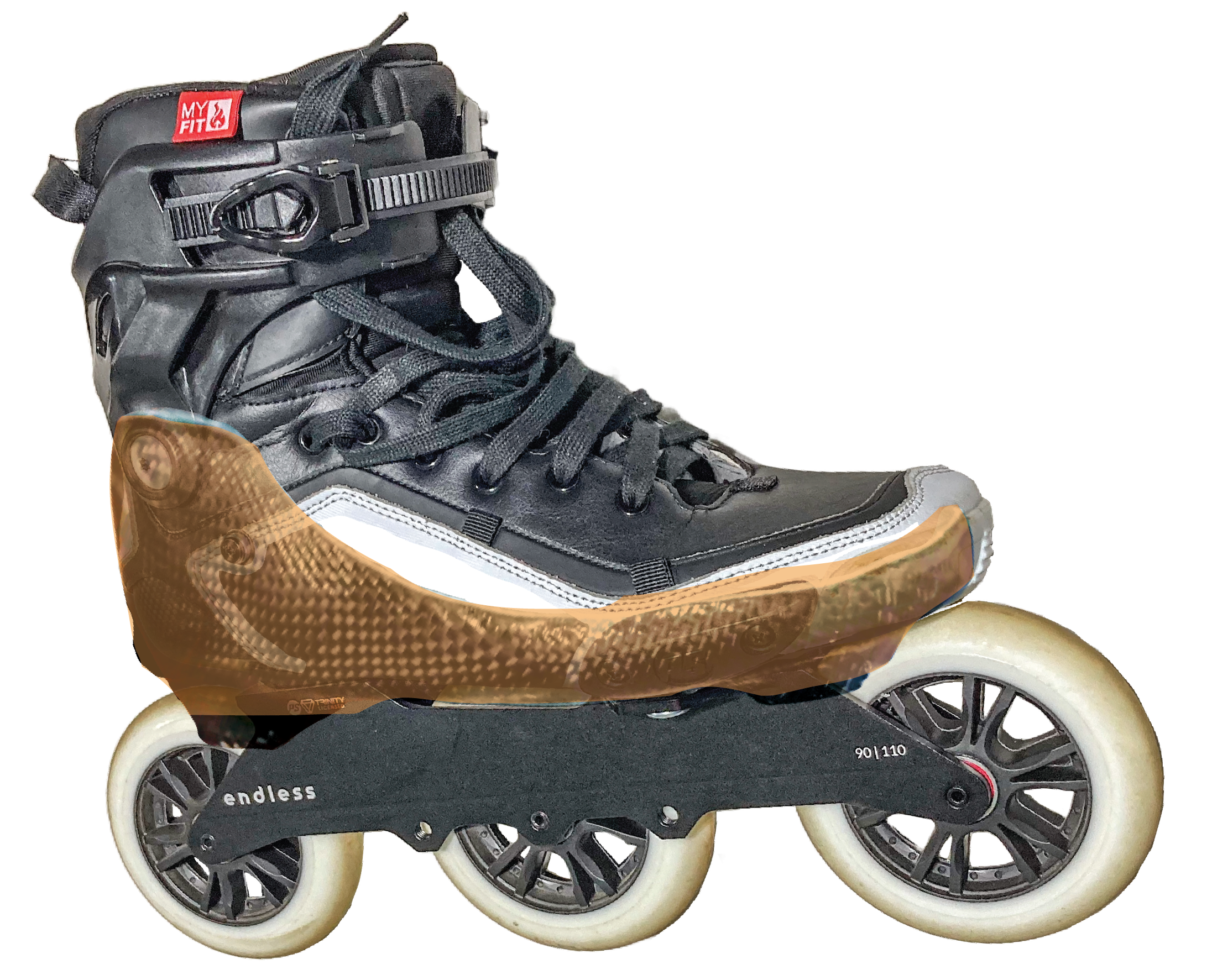
Endoskeleton shell

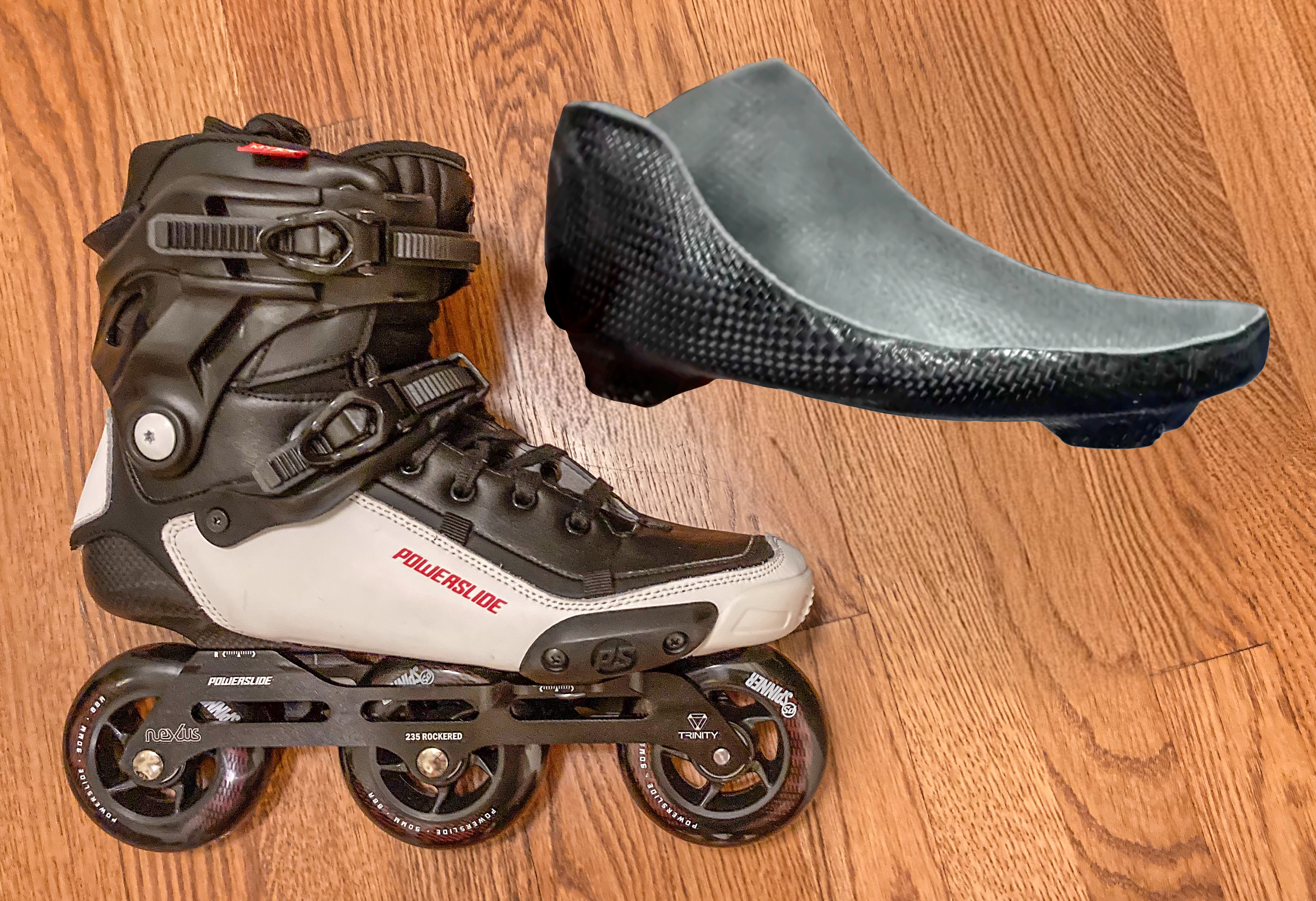
Carbon shell

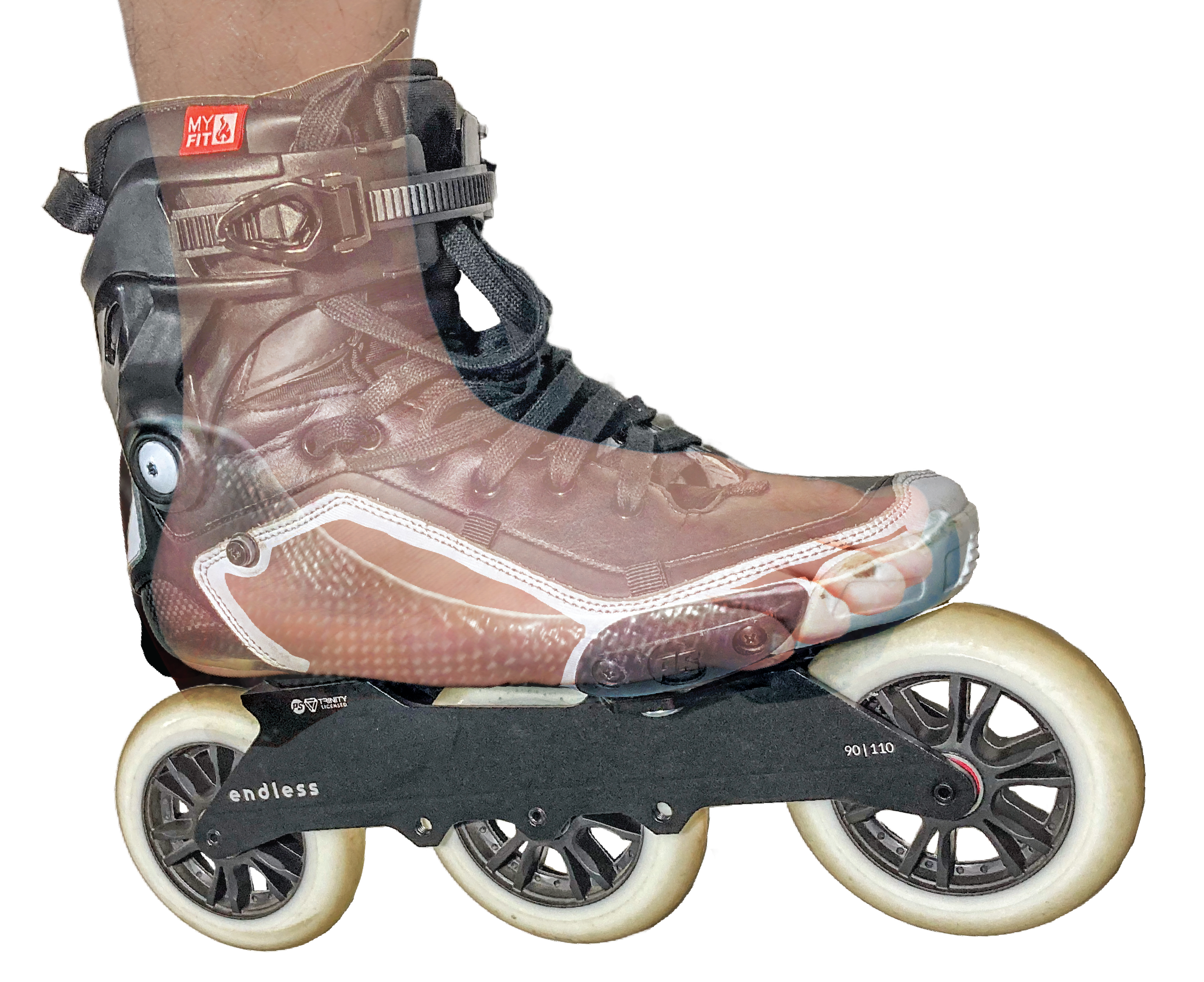
Foot and shell

Hybrid boots, also known as hybrid soft boots, look superficially similar to soft boots, complete with soft materials covering a large part of the boot. Unlike soft boots, however, hybrid boots have no exoskeleton reinforcement apart from the pivoting cuff. These boots have an endoskeleton instead, in the form of a composite shell. The shell serves as the sole of the boot, with shell walls extending upward from the sole. The soft upper part of the boot is pulled taut over the shell and glued onto it.

Hybrid boots are lighter than hard boots and soft boots. Yet they remain rigid where the foot meets the boot. Integrated liners in hybrid boots can be made thinner than removable liners in hard boots. In higher-end hybrid boots, the integrated liner is heat-moldable for the best custom fit, and the shell is made of carbon fiber. A hybrid shell sits much closer to the foot than a hard shell or the exoskeleton of a soft boot. As a result, hybrid boots provide more direct and responsive power transfer from a foot to wheels.

Hybrid boots originated from the development of carbon shells in speed skates during the 1990s and 2000s. In the 2020s, manufacturers like Powerslide offer hybrid inline skates, including models such as the Hardcore Evo, Tau, and Swell. However, the term "hybrid" has yet to gain universal acceptance, and these boots are often marketed as high-end soft boots.

=== One-piece carbon boots ===
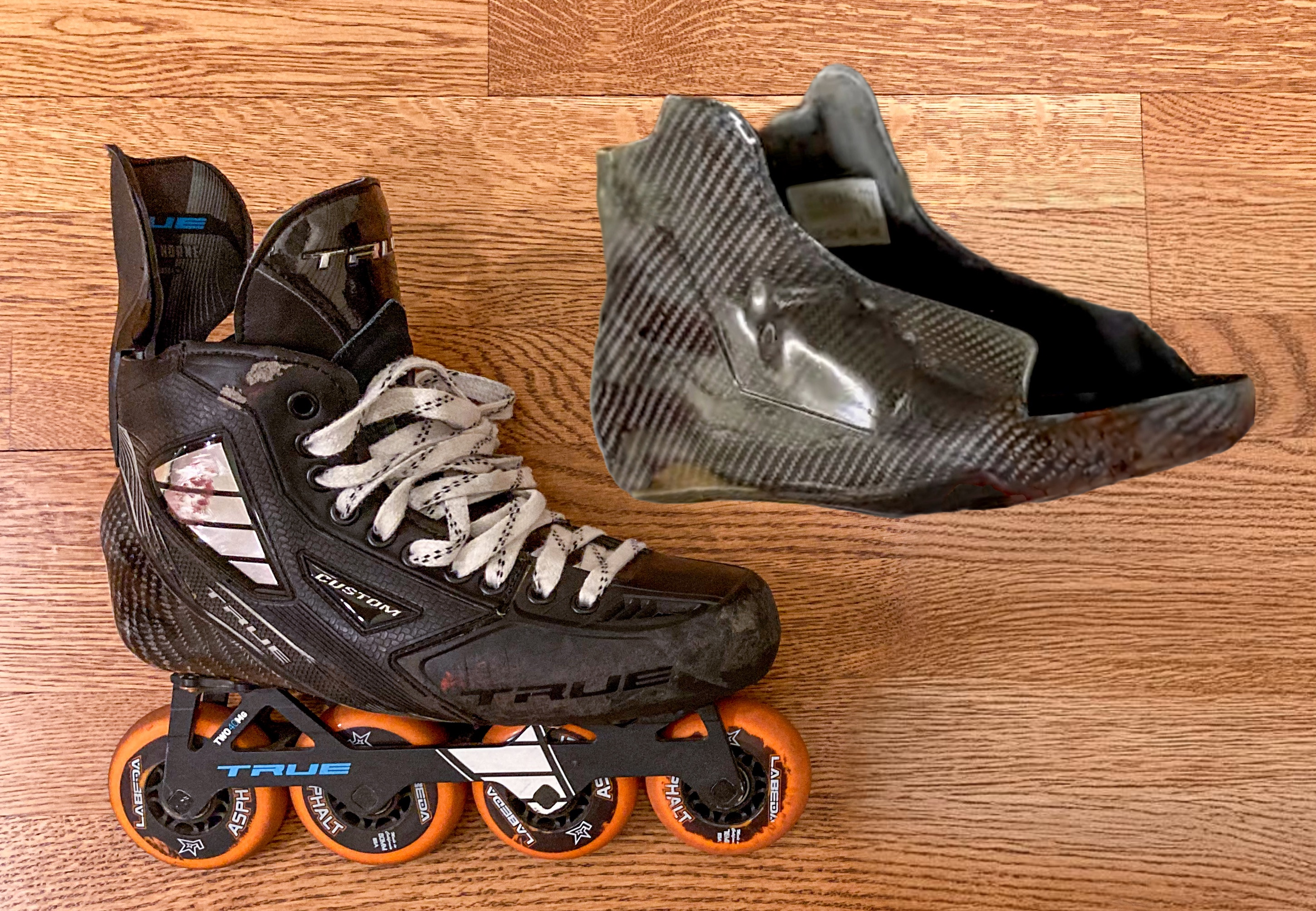
Monocoque shell

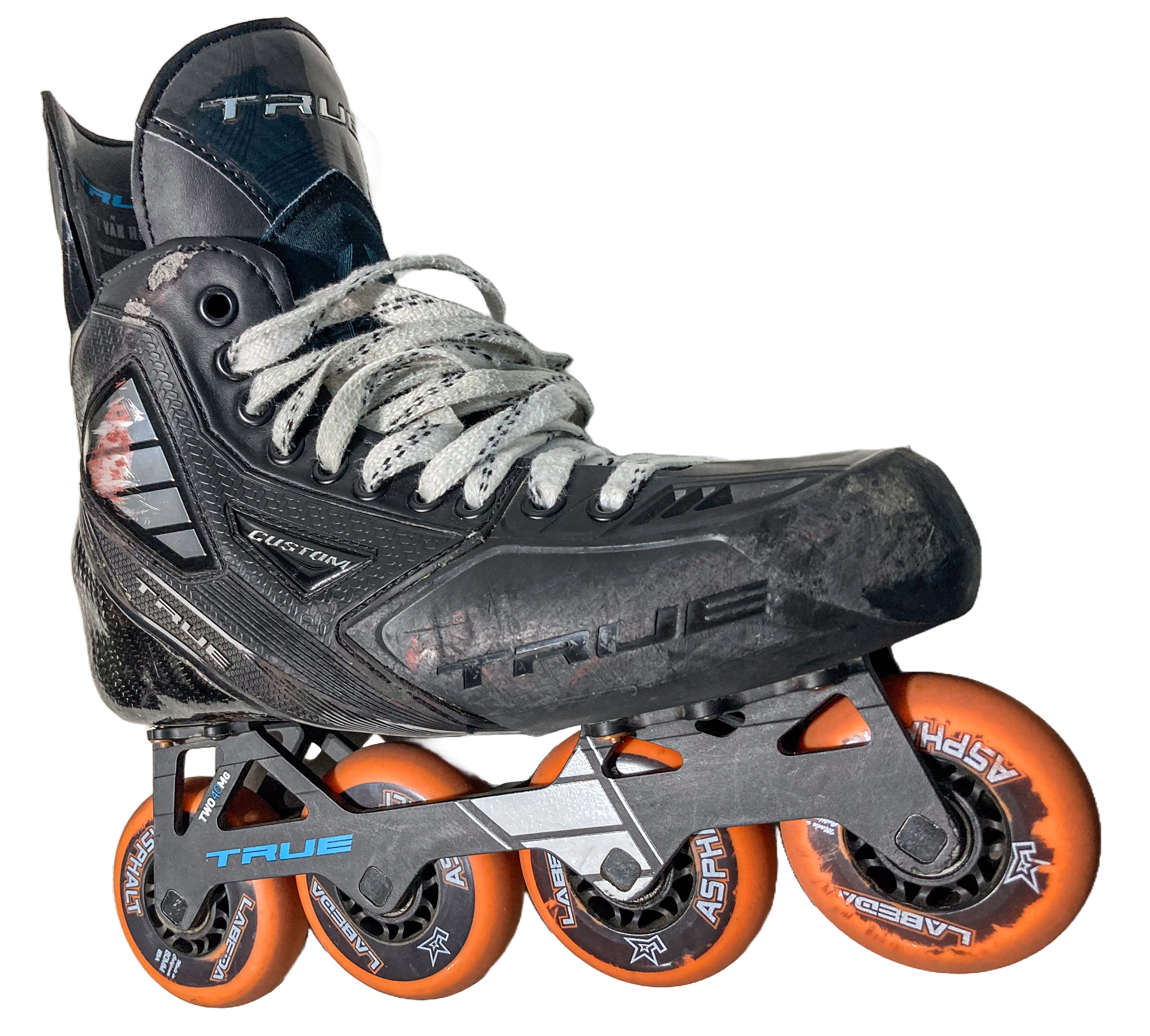
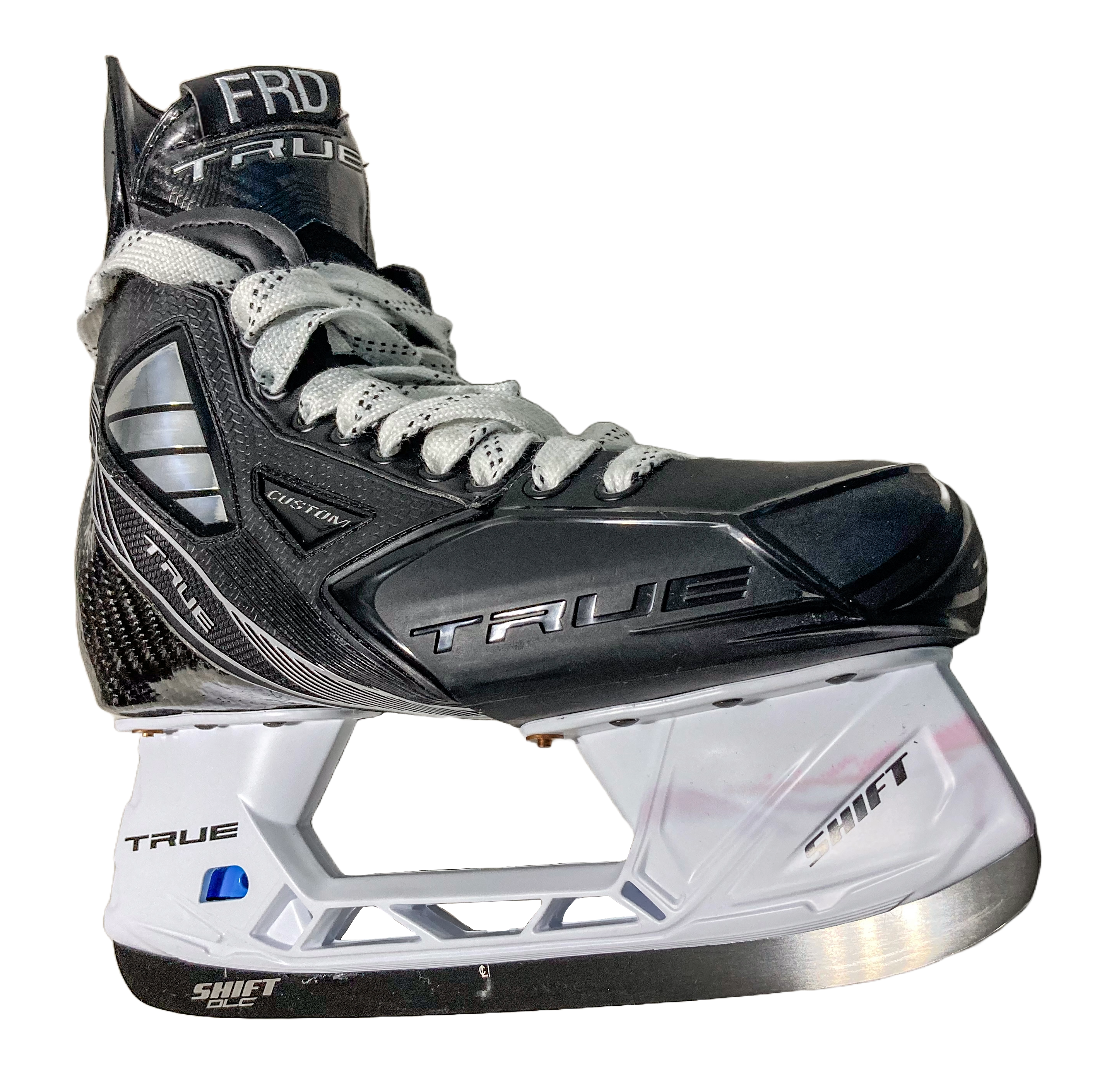
TF Pro inline skate vs. ice skate

In the 21st century, hockey skates increasingly favor "one-piece" carbon boots with a monocoque shell that were first developed in the 1990s for speed skating. These boots are unlike the three common types of inline boots: hard, soft and hybrid. The one-piece boots are built around a carbon fiber-reinforced composite shell, where the shell almost completely surrounds a foot. After eyelet holes are punched out of a shell, the shell is usable as a functional boot if laced.

For instance, Easton's Synergy 1300C came out in 2005, with a unitary shell made with carbon and aramid fibers. This is widely recognized as the first retail hockey skate with a composite shell. Heat molding became possible in 2006, with the Easton Synergy 1500C. Other hockey makers, such as VH Hockey, took it one step further, creating a single, unbroken composite shell that also incorporates the "facing" portion where eyelets are located. A heat-moldable monocoque shell requires no breaking-in, unlike traditional hockey skates.

True Temper Sports bought VH Hockey in 2016, and started to mass-produce retail hockey skates with heat-moldable monocoque shells, as well as scaling up 3D scanning of feet at retail stores for custom-molded True hockey skates, leading to inline hockey skates such as the TF9 Roller Skate, and the TF Pro Custom Roller Skate in 2020.

== Frames ==
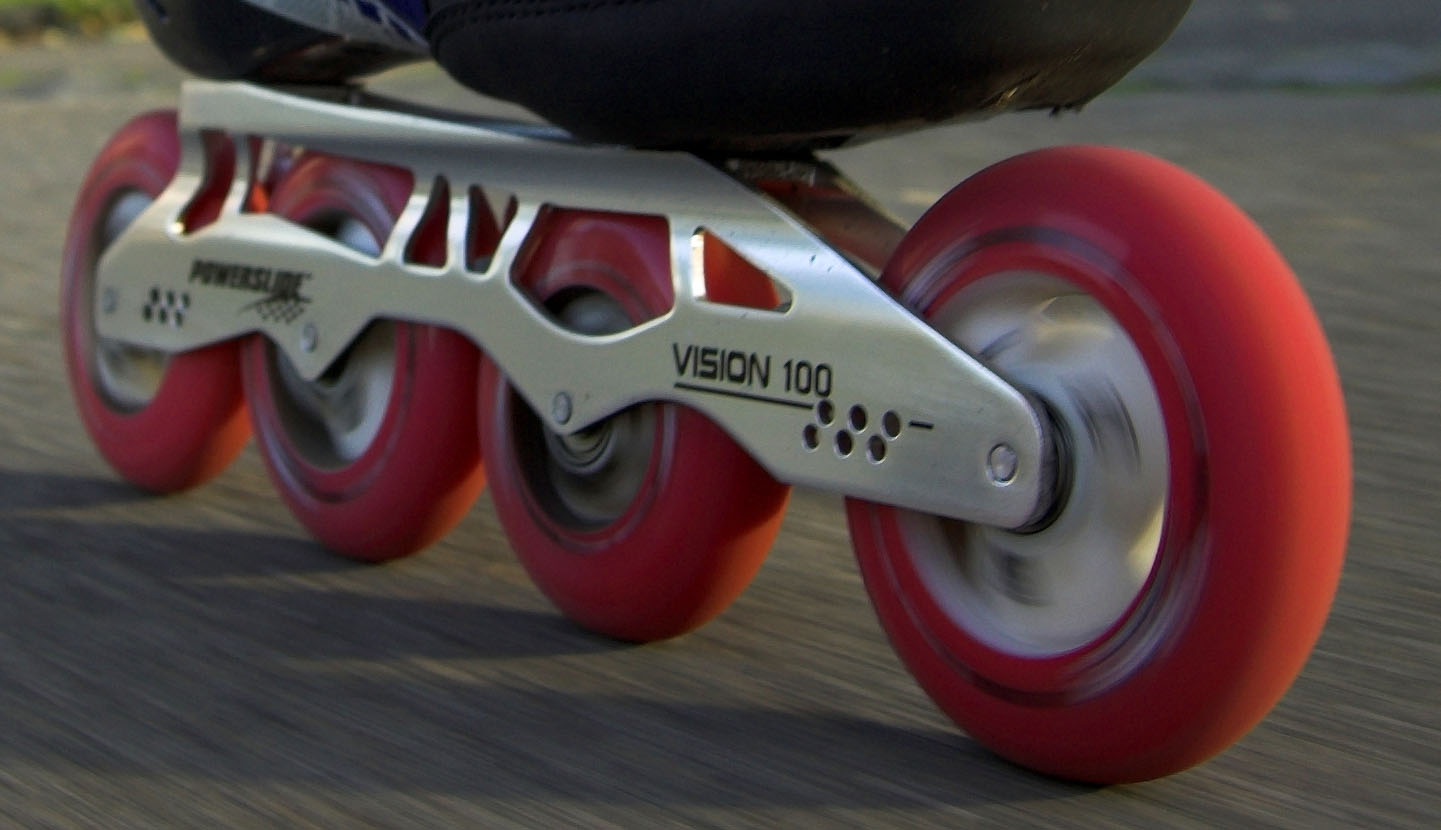
Frame and wheels

An inline skate frame, sometimes referred to as the "chassis" in certain disciplines such as hockey, serves as the structural link between the boot and the wheels. It connects to the ground through the wheels mounted on it, and to the skater's foot through the sole of the boot.

=== Frame dimensions ===
"Frame length", also known as wheelbase, refers to the distance between the centers of the first and last wheel axles. In disciplines like hockey and slalom, skaters use short frames with closely packed wheels to enhance maneuverability and enable fluid footwork. In contrast, speed skating relies on longer frames, which space out the wheels to provide greater stability at high speeds.

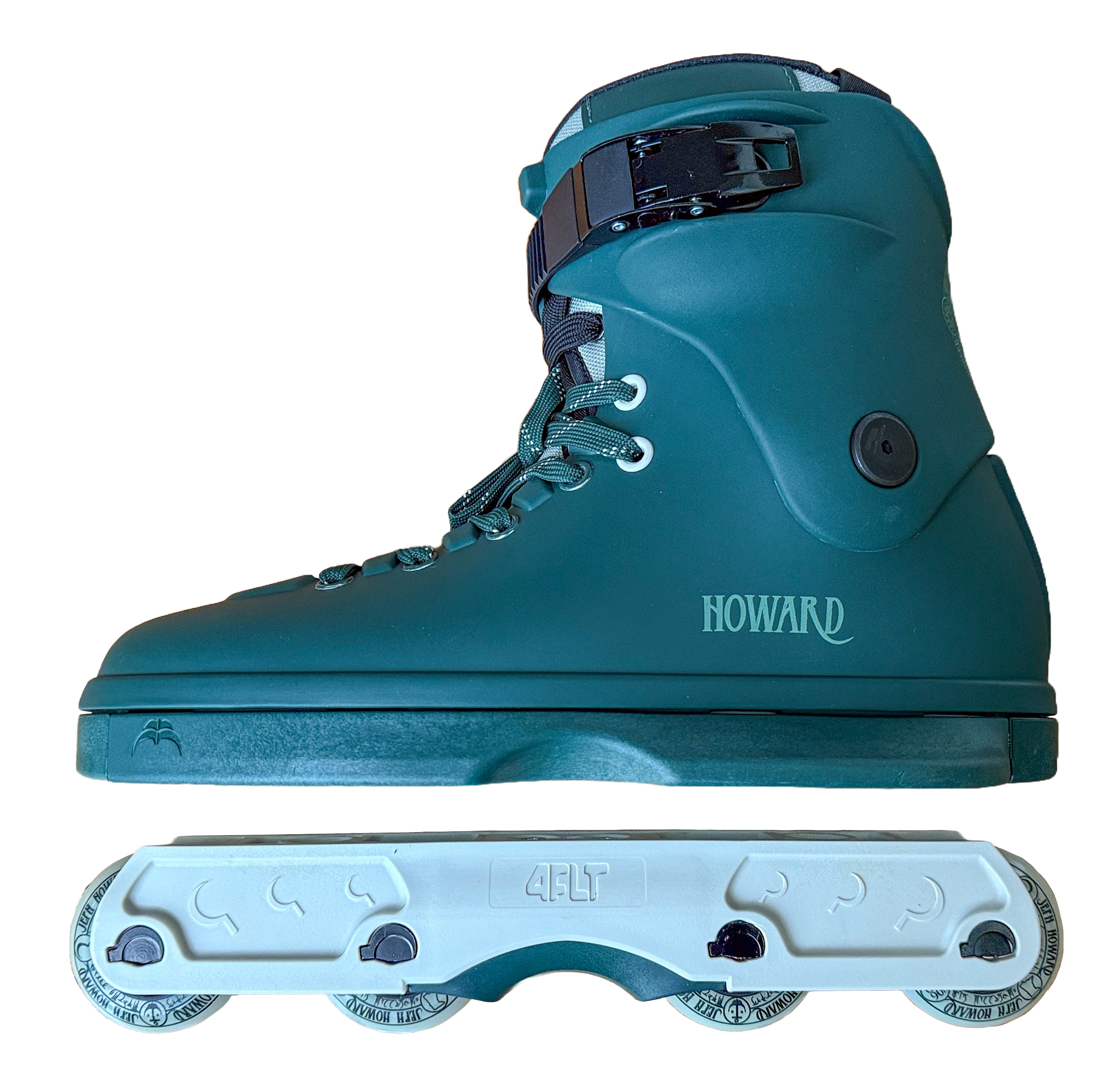
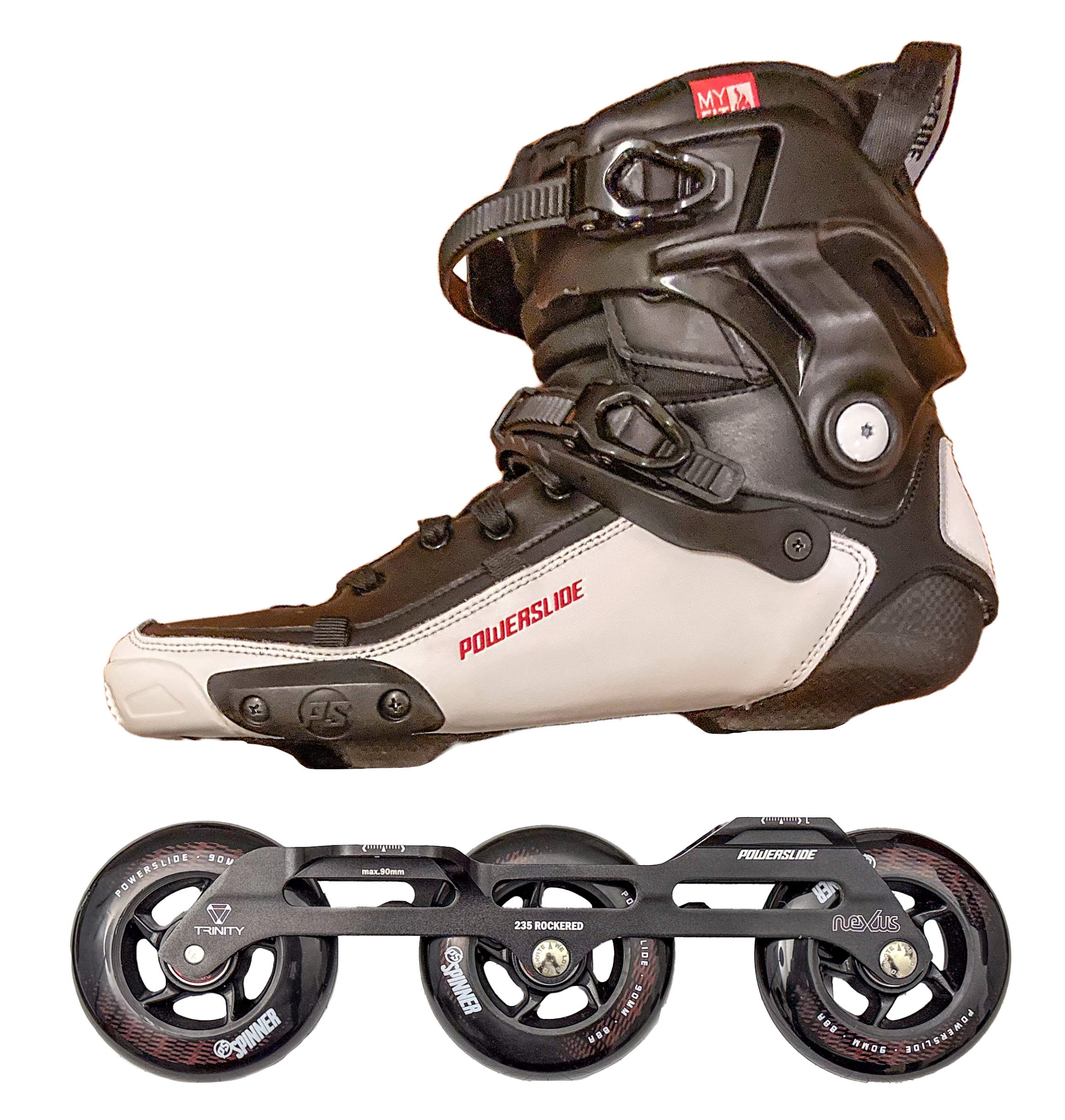
Level deck height (UFS) vs. raised heel (Trinity)

"Frame height", "deck height", and "ride height" are related but loosely defined terms in inline skating. All three describe how low a boot can be positioned relative to the ground in a given setup, considering the number and size of the wheels. Ideally, a skater wants the boot as close to the ground as possible, while allowing enough clearance between the sole and the wheel tops for free rotation. All three terms may refer to the distance from the frame's deck to the wheel axle center, excluding wheel size. In other cases, they are defined as sole-to-ground distance, incorporating both the structure of a frame and of actual wheel size. (Note: The loosely defined terms "frame height", "deck height", and "ride height" are usually absent from the technical specifications of skates or frames. However, they are frequently used in reviews and buying guides for comparison. In the following articles, the distance from the bottom of a boot (i.e., the sole) to the ground is variously referred to as frame height, deck height, and ride height: Skating Magic archive, Inline Warehouse archive, Cadomotus archive, Loco Skates archive 1, and Loco Skates archive 2. Similarly, the distance from the top of a mount (i.e., roughly the sole) to the center of a wheel axle is described as deck height and ride height in these articles: Atom Skates archive and Loco Skates archive 3. Only in rare instances, such as on this product page, does "frame height" actually refer to the physical measurement of the frame itself.)

=== Frame rigidity ===
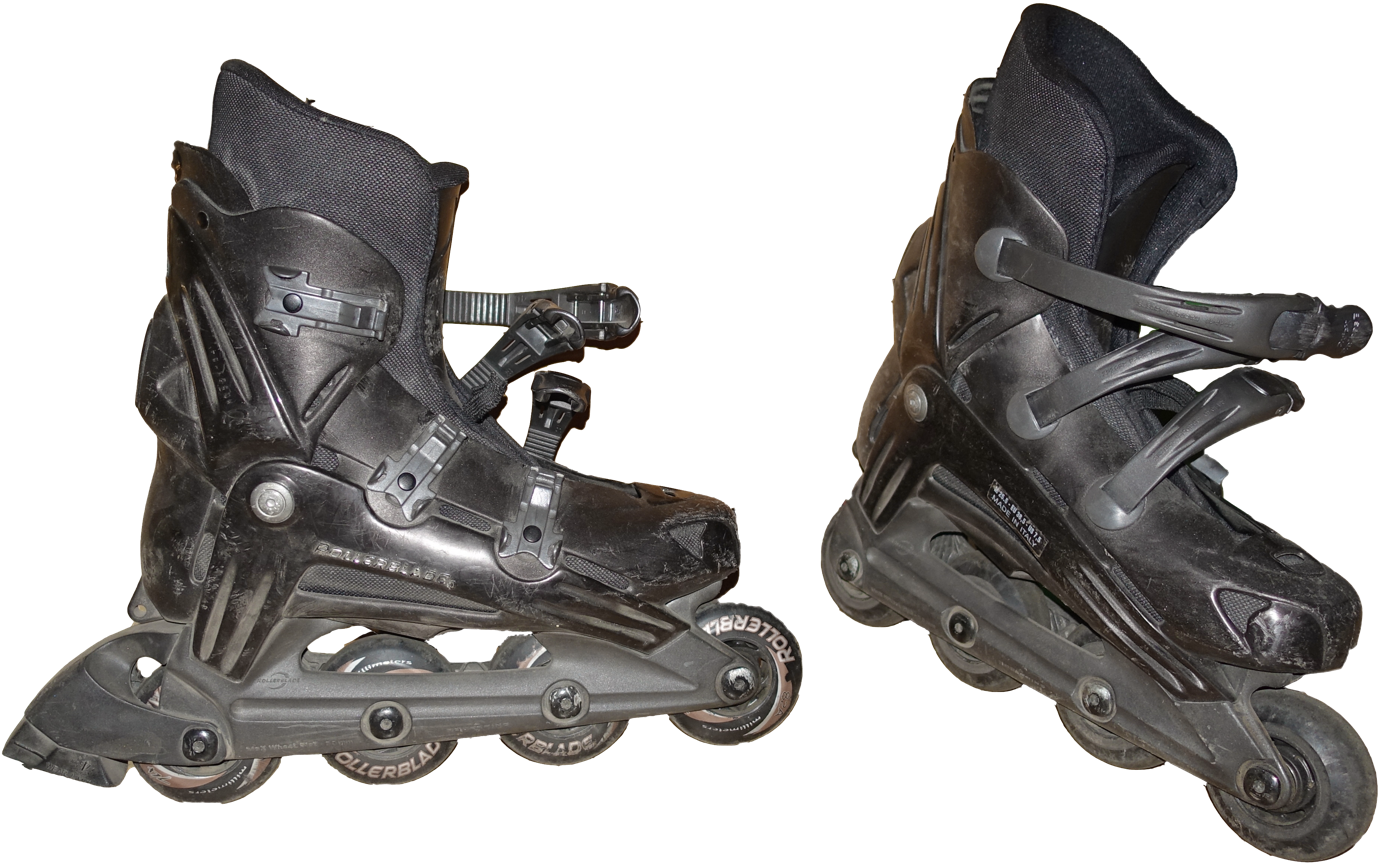
Plastic frames

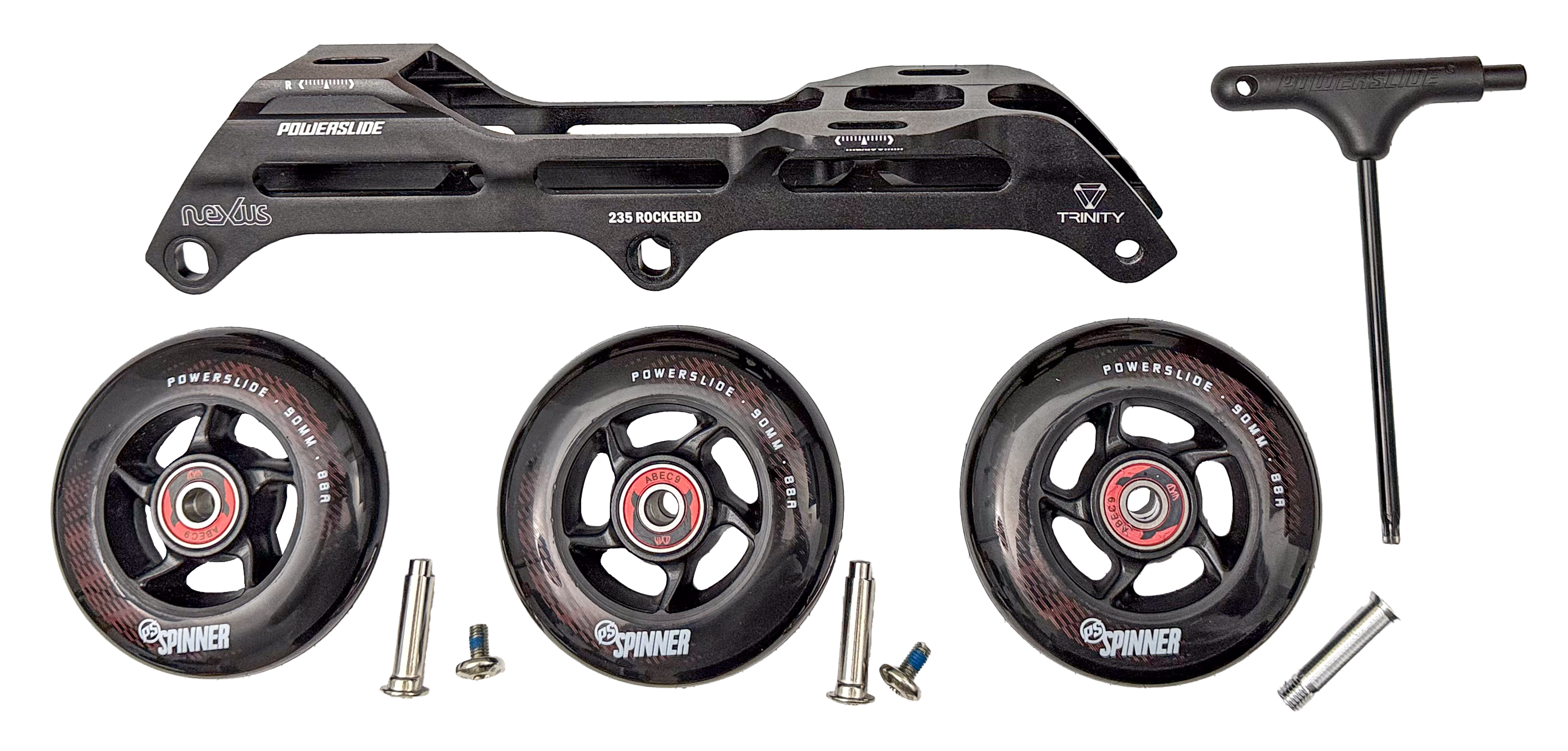
Extruded & milled aluminum

Frame rigidity is essential for an efficient transfer of power from a skater's foot to the ground. A rigid frame does not suffer from elastic hysteresis. For this reason, even entry-level inline skates often use fiberglass-reinforced plastic, instead of softer but cheaper plastic to make frames. For a stiffer yet lightweight frame, aircraft-grade aluminum alloys such as the 6000 and 7000 series are used. Hockey and speed skating often call for magnesium frames, which are even stiffer and lighter than aluminum. Some speed skaters use carbon fiber frames that are the most rigid and lightweight frames available.

Rigidity of a frame is an important factor in choosing one. However, other considerations, including cost and weight, also influence the decision. Sometimes, a discipline's needs trump many of these factors. For instance, aggressive skaters exclusively use fiberglass-reinforced plastic frames for their superior performance and consistent friction when grinding against all types of surfaces. Some of the most rigid frames, such as those made of carbon fiber, can be too brittle for hockey. These frames shatter rather than deform under impact or extreme stress due to their low fracture toughness. In addition, some skaters value comfort, which is at odds with rigid frames; increased rigidity transmits all imperfections of the road surface to the skater unattenuated, reducing comfort.

=== Rockerable frames ===
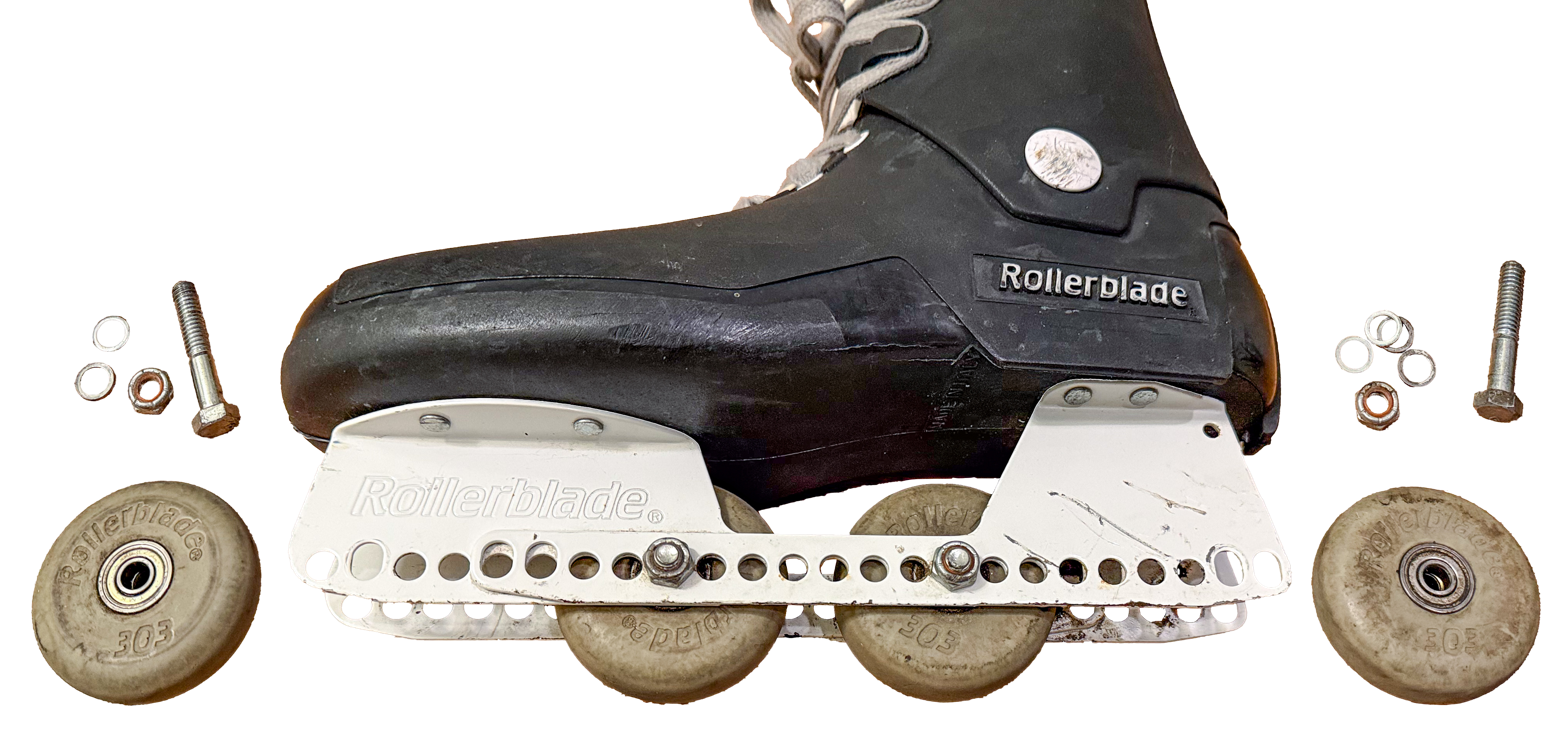
Rockerable frame: 1980s

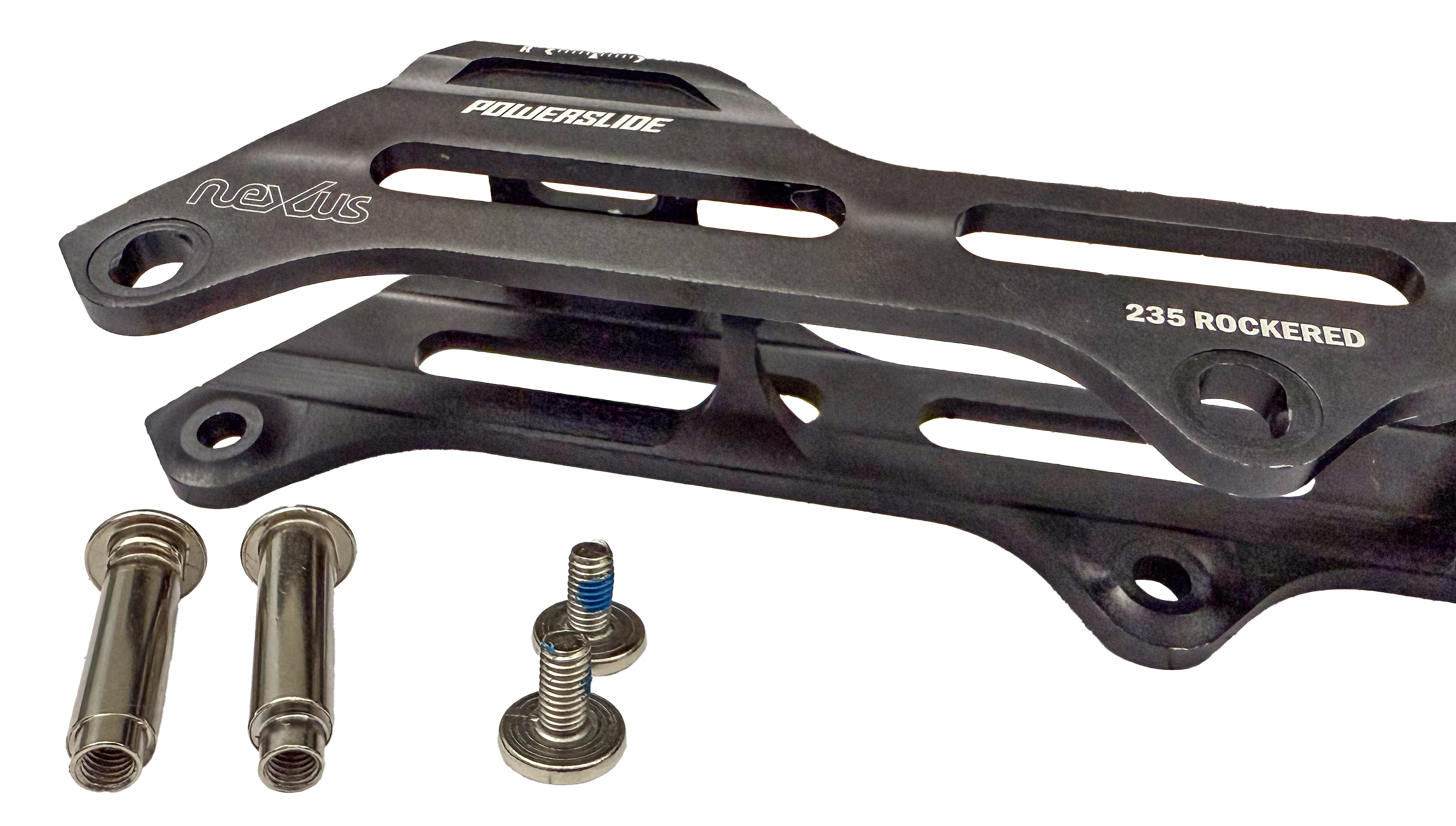
Toggleable axles: 2020

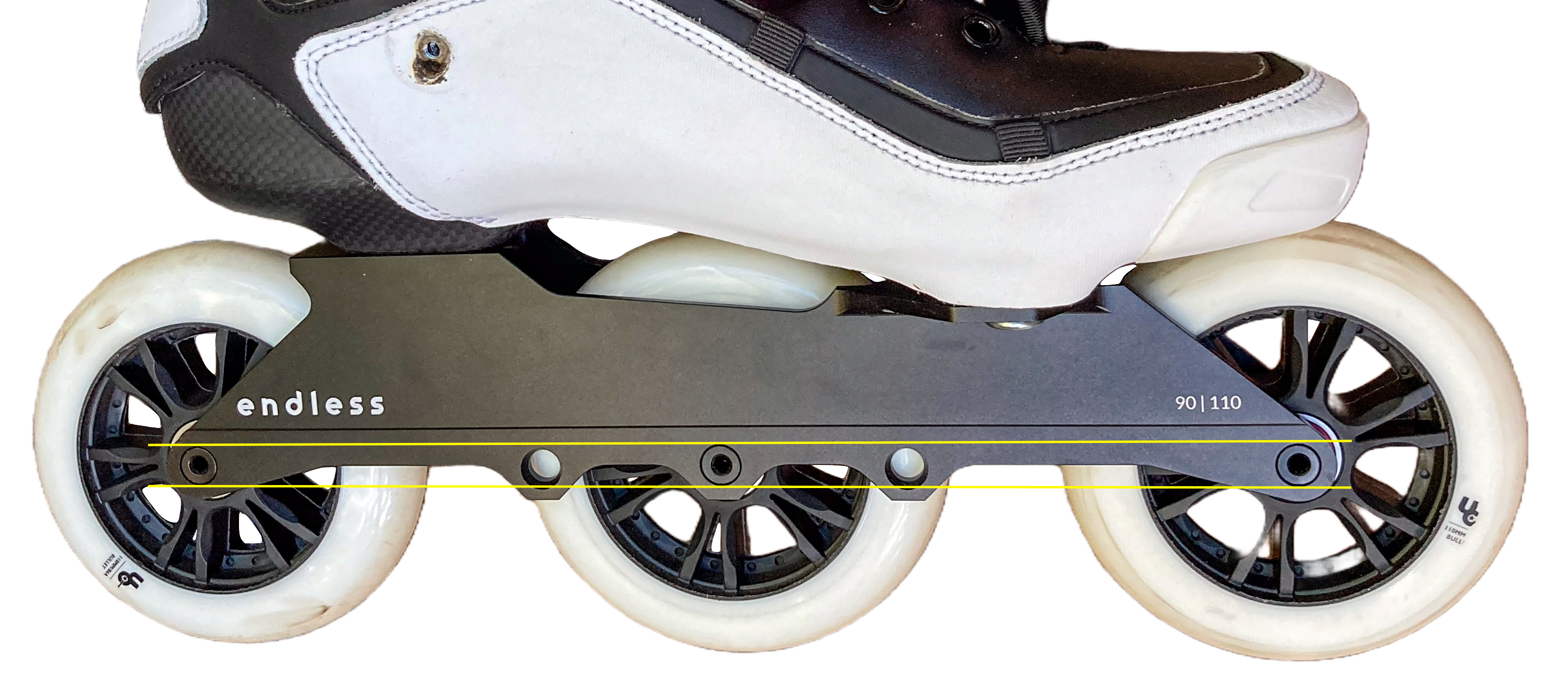
Pre-rockered: 2025

Wheel rockering can be achieved by using wheels of different diameters, or by using a frame with built-in support for a rockered arrangement of identical wheels. Such rockerable frames may be configured in either a flat setup for long-distance skating, or a banana-rockered setup for highly maneuverable disciplines like hockey, with sharp turns and quick footwork.

Some frames are compatible with specialized hardware for quick and reliable switching of wheel setups. These involved the use of frame spacers, axle guides, mounting hole inserts, or axle bolts that fit oblong mounting holes in two ways. Such hardware can be toggled to shift the axle's center between two preset positions. (Note: Brennan Olson's patent application filed in 1987 described key innovations in the 1988 Lightning skate: a single-piece plastic frame with reinforcement bridges, toggleable inserts for mounting hole for rockering (named axle aperture plug in the specification), and wheel hubs each with an interlock rim (named outer annular ring 16P) over which polyurethane is molded to reduce wheel deformation and heat buildup.)

With the advent of mounting standards and easily swappable frames in the 21st century, some inline frames now eschew toggleable hardware in pursuit of reduction in complexity, weight, and number of components. Each brand offers its own pre-rockered frame with custom axle holes to create a wheel arrangement that it deems optimal.

=== Non-standard frames ===
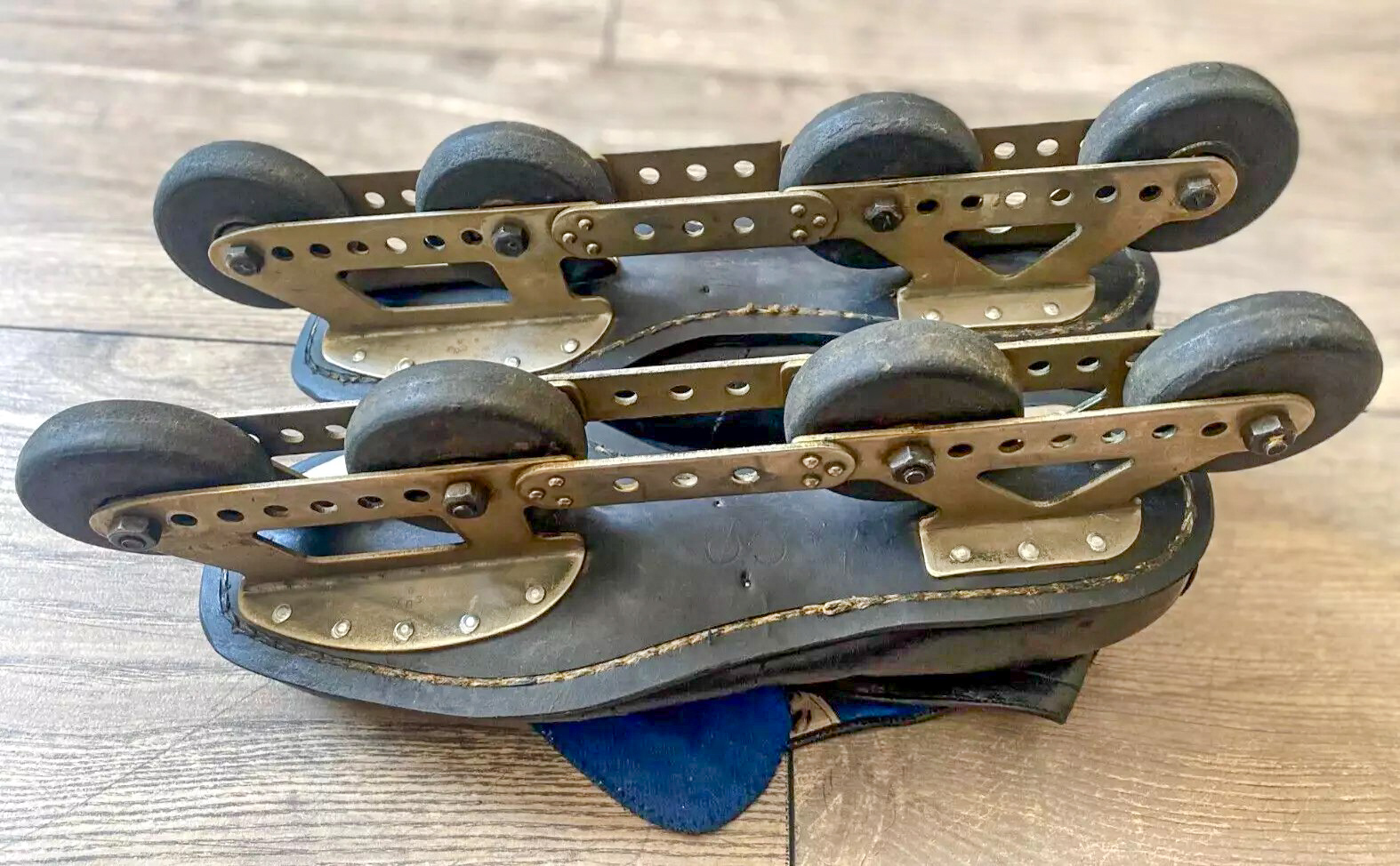
USSR skates (1960s)

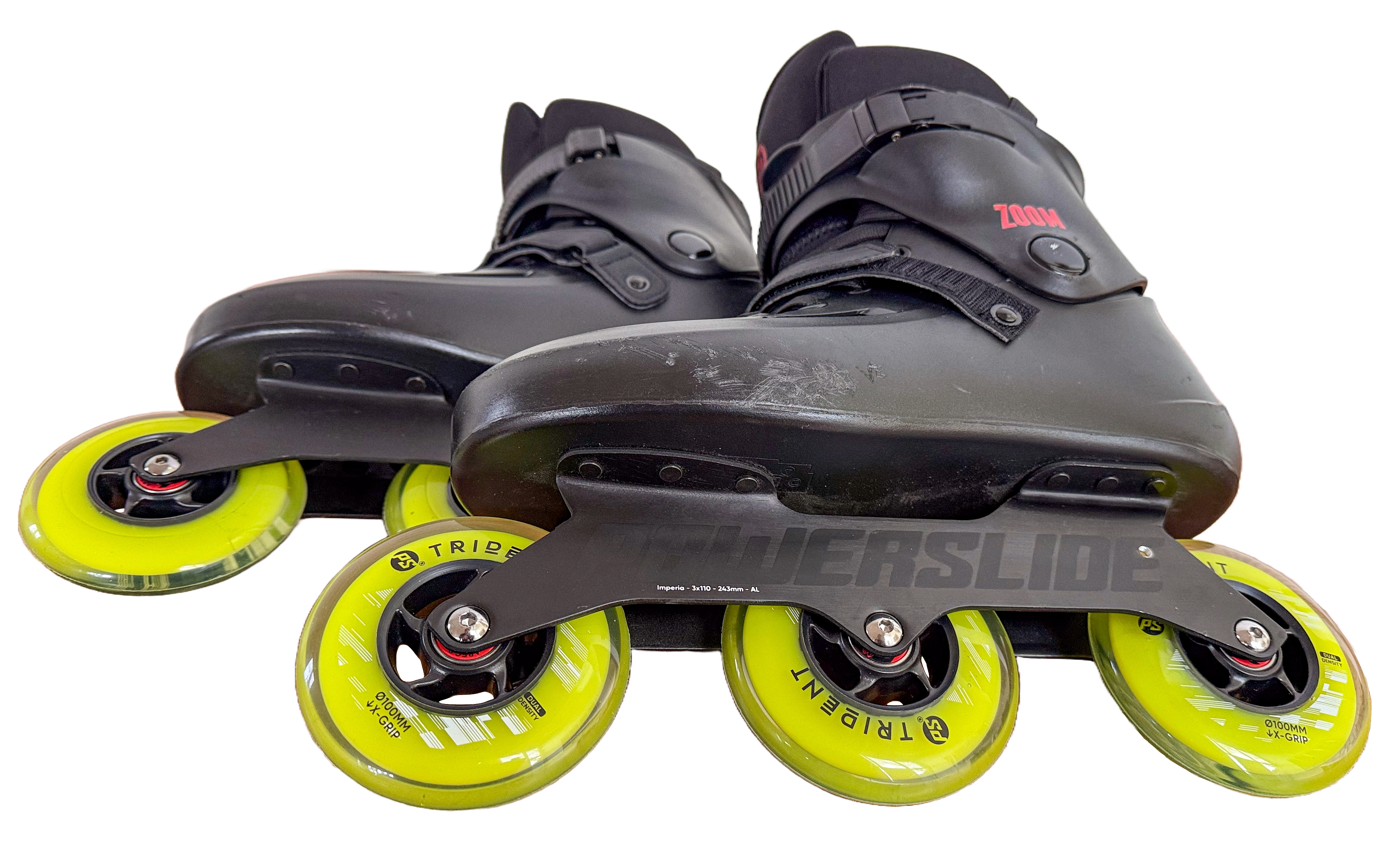
PS One Zoom (2024)

Modern inline skates began as off-season training tools for ice skaters. Early frames, including those used by the USSR speed skating team in the 1960s, featured adjustable lengths and variable wheel positions to fit different shoe sizes. This approach continued in the 1966 Chicago Roller-Blade and early 1980s Rollerblade skates. (Note: See pictures of the new generation of early Rollerblade skates with heel brakes, from Vintage Minnesota Hockey: picture, picture, picture and picture, archived here, here, here and here. These have a refined version of the adjustable frame from the Ultimate Street Skate, and a similar hard boot. These skates witnessed the transition of Scott Olson's company from "Ole's Innovative Sports", to "North American Sports Training Corp.", and finally to "Rollerblade", as attested by marketing materials.) Early inline skates lacked mounting standards. The 1962 USSR skate and 1966 Chicago Roller-Blade fit dress shoes with heels, while the 1975 Super Sport Skate, modeled after hockey boots, already had a raised heel mount on the frame.

Non-standard frames still dominate entry-level skates and are often non-replaceable. Most lack adjustment for pronation or supination. Some, like the 2024 Powerslide One Zoom, use riveted frames that cannot be customized. Outside the entry-level market, most inline skates follow one of three mounting standards: UFS, 165mm, or Trinity. The exception is hockey skates, which still use riveted mounts like ice hockey boots. All hockey skates, from budget to high-end custom models, have proprietary, non-replaceable frames.

=== 165mm and 195mm frames ===
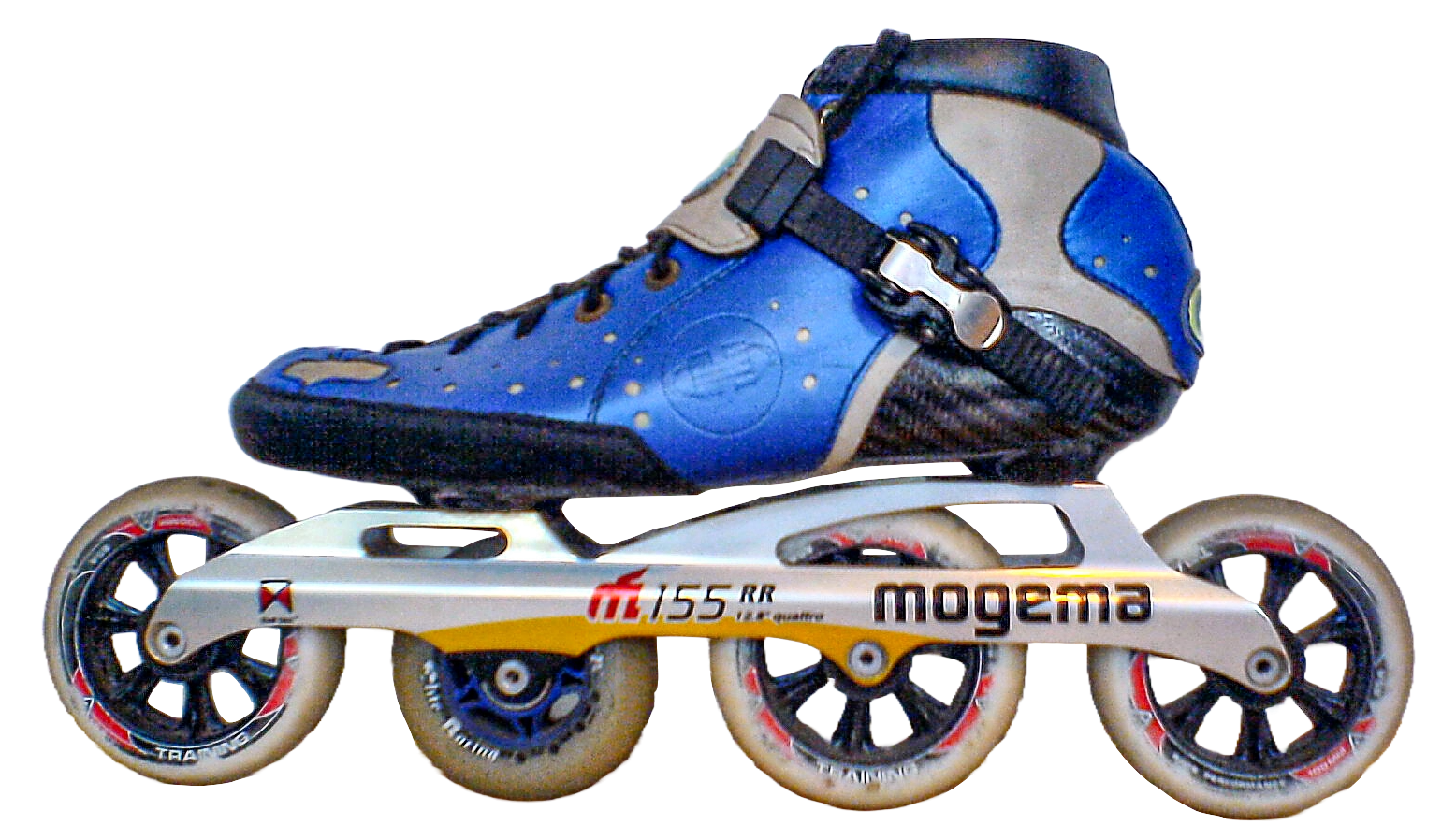
165mm speed boot

In 1974, Inze Bont introduced fiberglass speed skate boots with 165 mm mounting holes for attaching adjustable ice blades. As inline skating grew in the mid-1980s, brands like Darkstar, Mogema, and Raps created frames to fit these boots, establishing the first inline skate mounting standard: the "165mm 2-point" system.

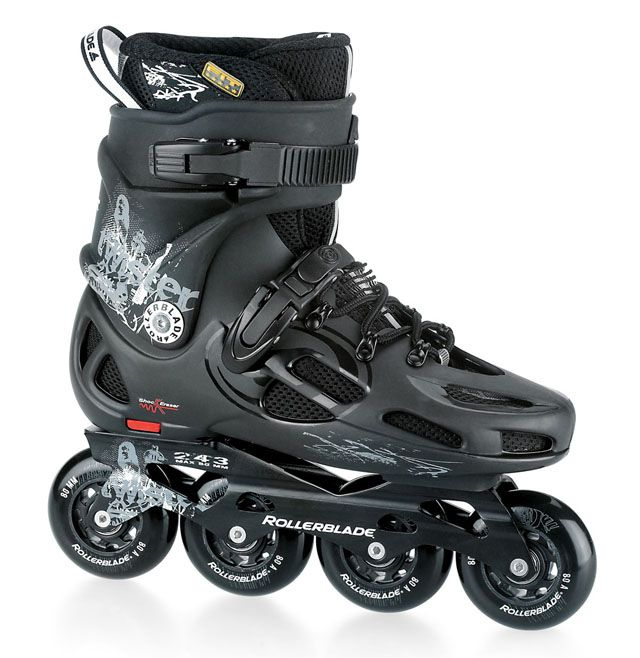
Rollerblade Twister 80 with a 165mm mount

Later known as SSM (Standard Speed Mount), this standard features a 10 mm heel raise that enhances power in push-offs through deeper ankle flexion. The standard does not specify a frame width, mount width or exact mounting locations on the boot. In practice, Bont boots offer only minimal mounting areas. But compatible and rigid frames can still be secured to a boot with minimal flex, especially with Bont's later kevlar and carbon boots. Roces Impala skates brought the 165mm standard outside of speed skating in the mid-1990s, expanding it to recreational, aggressive, and slalom skating. However, softer soles in these boots may flex under load, prompting reinforcement with metal plates.

Originally designed for five small wheels (e.g. 5x80mm), the 165mm layout caused bolt interference when 4x100mm setups with larger wheels became popular, forcing frames to become taller. To address this, the "195mm 2-point" LSM (Long Speed Mount) was introduced in 2003. It allows longer frames and larger wheels, while retaining the same heel raise, without adding additional height. This design provides a stable ride at high speeds by maintaining a relatively low center of gravity in proportion to the longer wheelbase. While LSM is mainly used in speed skating, many frames now include slots to fit both standards.

=== UFS frames ===
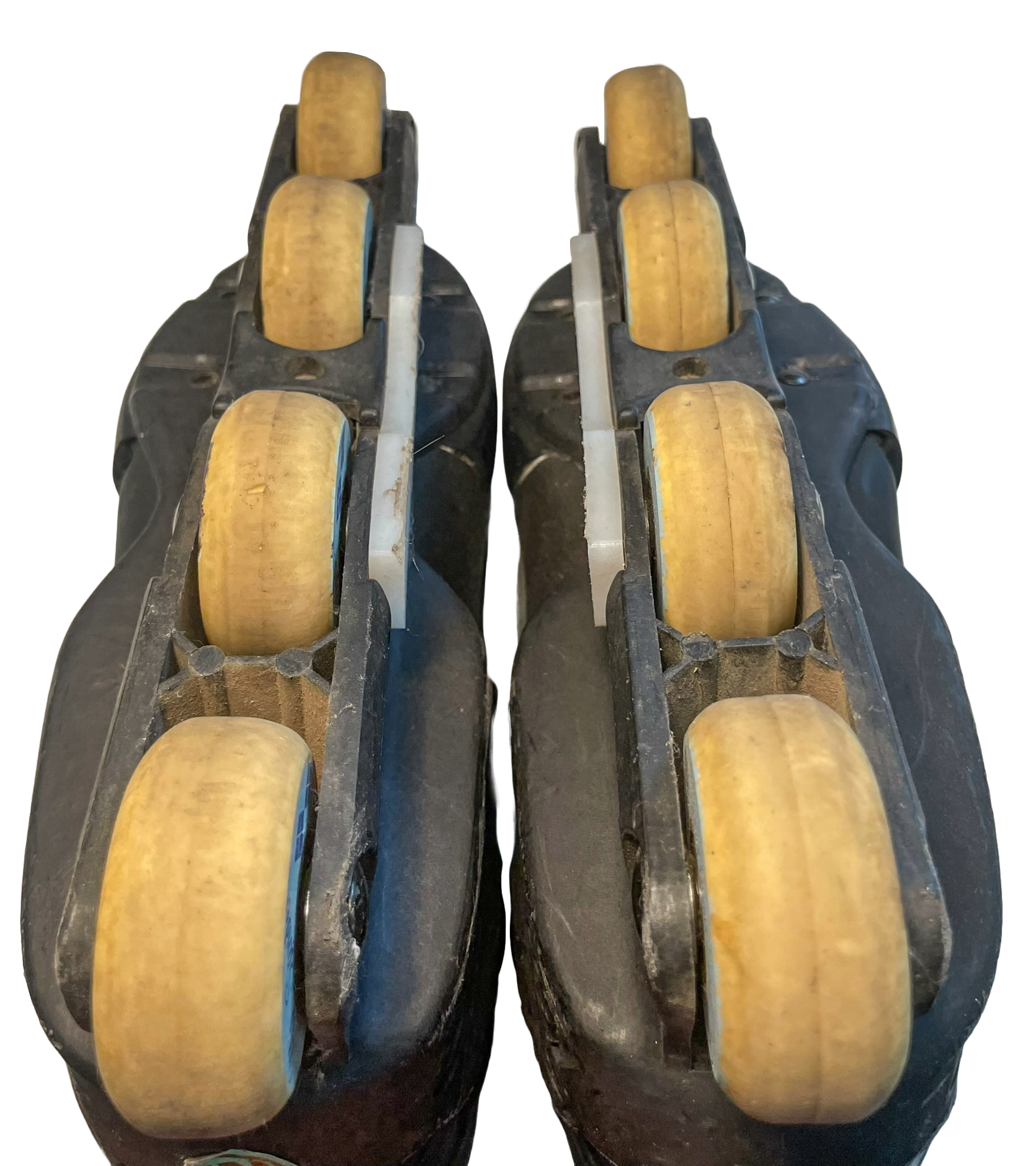
K2 Fatty Pro

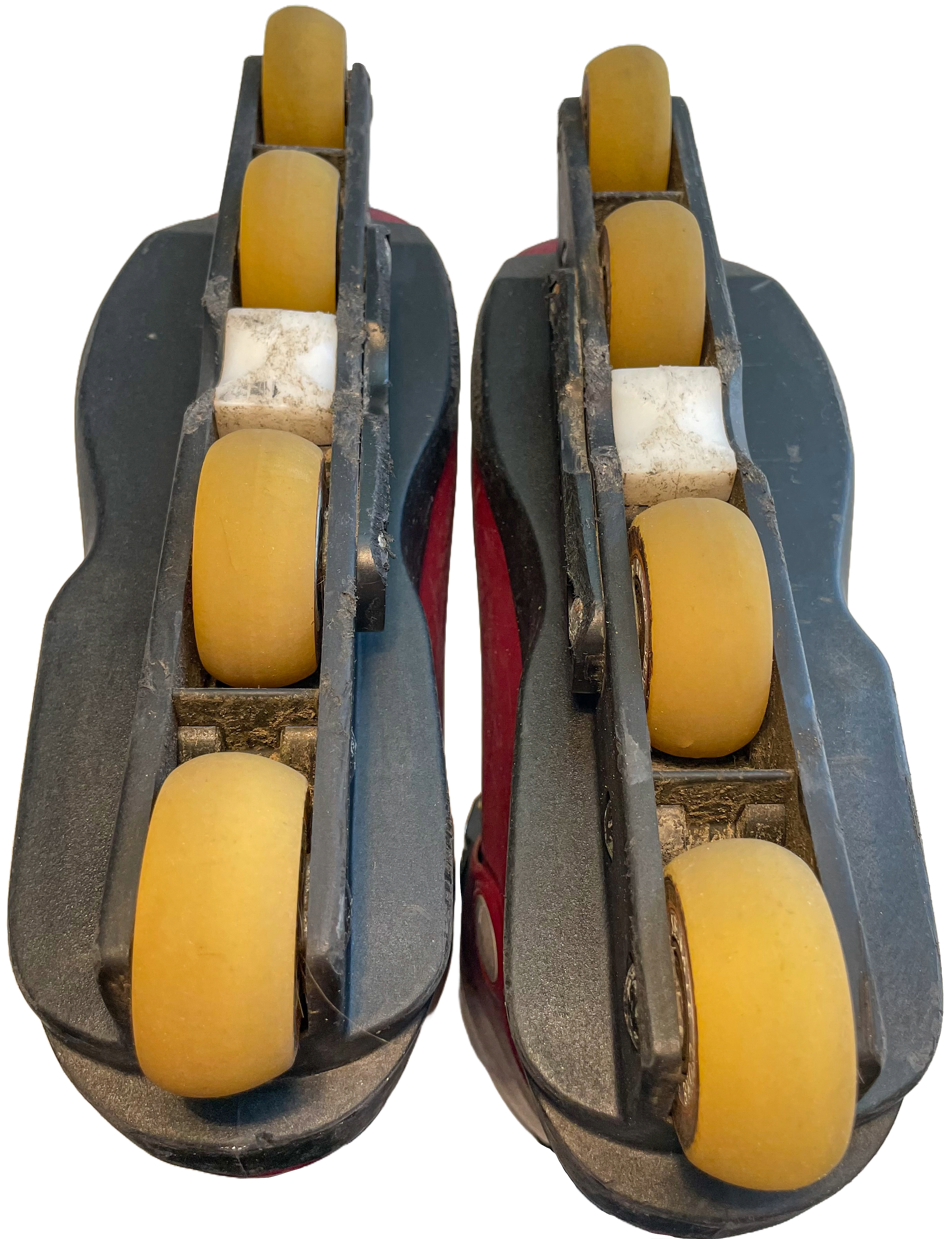
5th Element

Aggressive inline skating gained mainstream attention after its 1995 ESPN X Games debut, sparking rapid growth and development of aggressive skates. Released in 1996, the K2 Fatty was the first skate to integrate the frame into the soulplate, reducing height differences and replacing the traditional two-part platform with a solid rectangular structure. In 1998, Roces released the 5th Element, an aggressive skate that combined the soulplate and frame into a single flat unit with no height difference between front and rear. This flat sole improved soul grinds and influenced other skate designs.

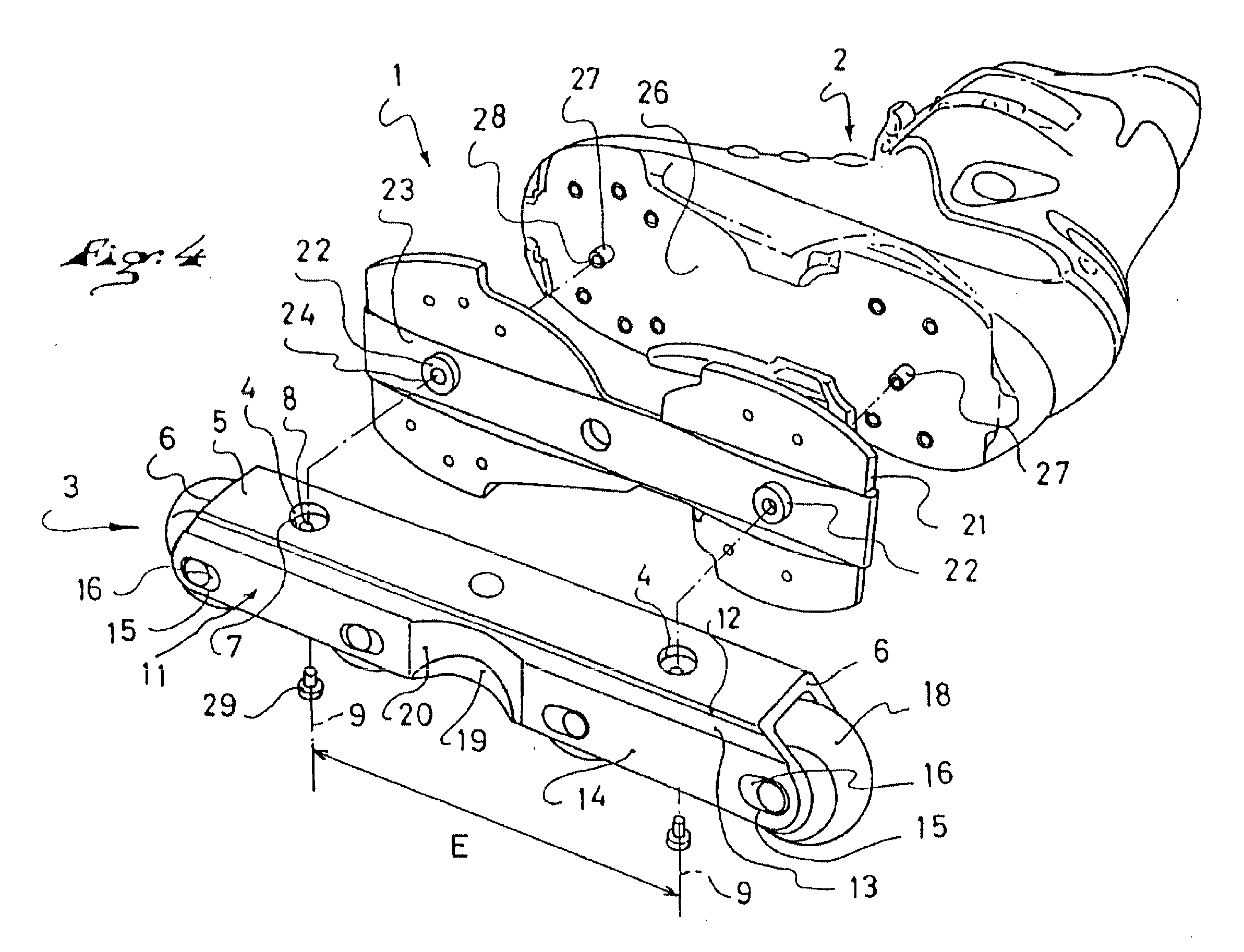
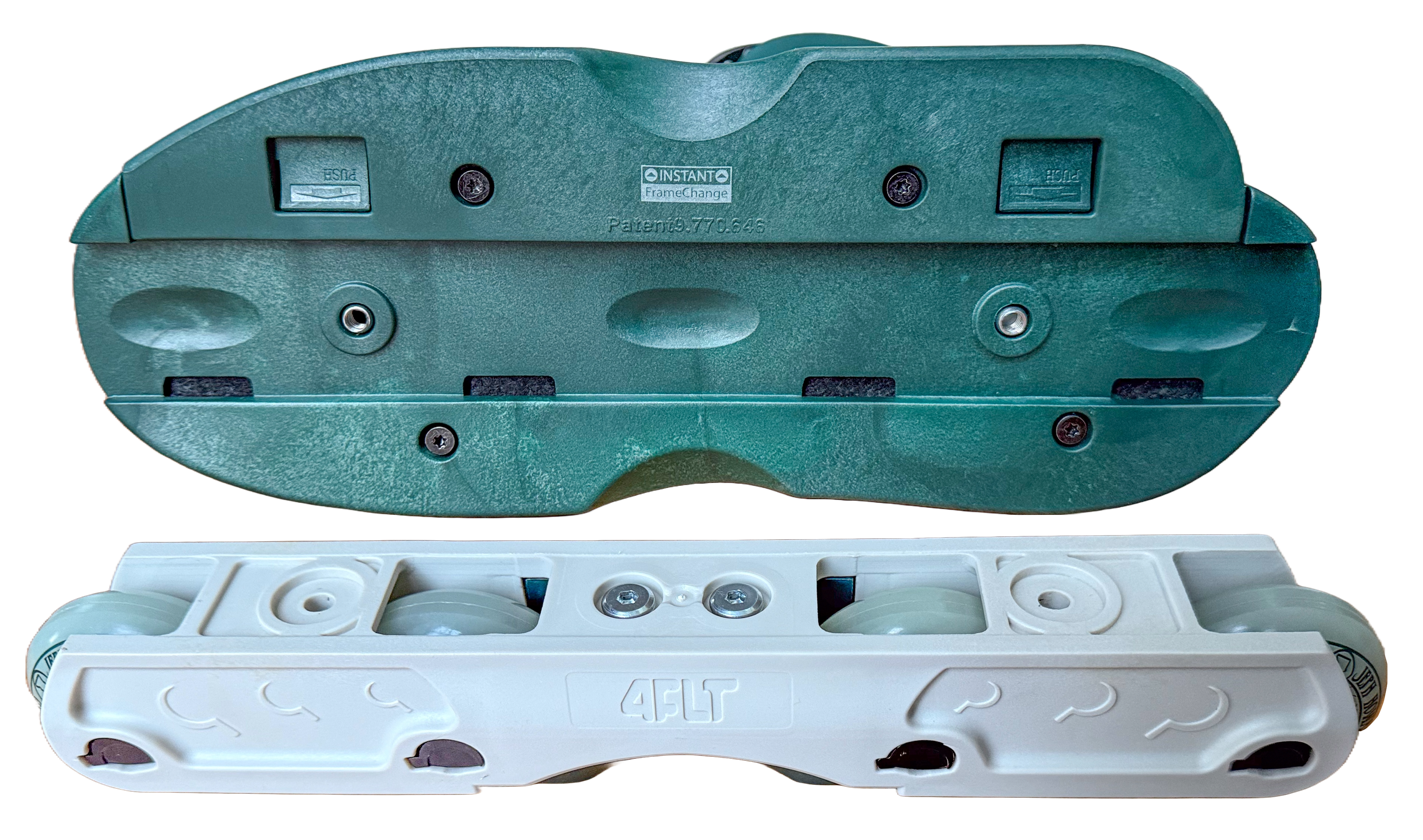
UFS patent drawing (left). Razors Shift - UFS boot and frame (right).

In 1999, Salomon, USD, Razors, Kizer, 7XL/Able, and Fifty/50 developed the Universal Frame System (UFS), a standardized mounting system for aggressive skates. It used a flat rectangular surface 41 mm wide with two holes spaced 167 mm apart, aligning with the trend of flat soulplates. Salomon's 2001 Aaron Feinberg Pro Model was the first skate to feature UFS and quickly became a popular industry standard.

Unlike other mounting systems of the time, UFS eliminated built-in heel raise, positioning the heel level with the toes for the first time. However, most brands followed Salomon's lead in incorporating a thick shock absorber at the heel. This provided better impact support for hard landings from high jumps, but accidentally reintroduced a small amount of heel raise.

=== Trinity frames ===
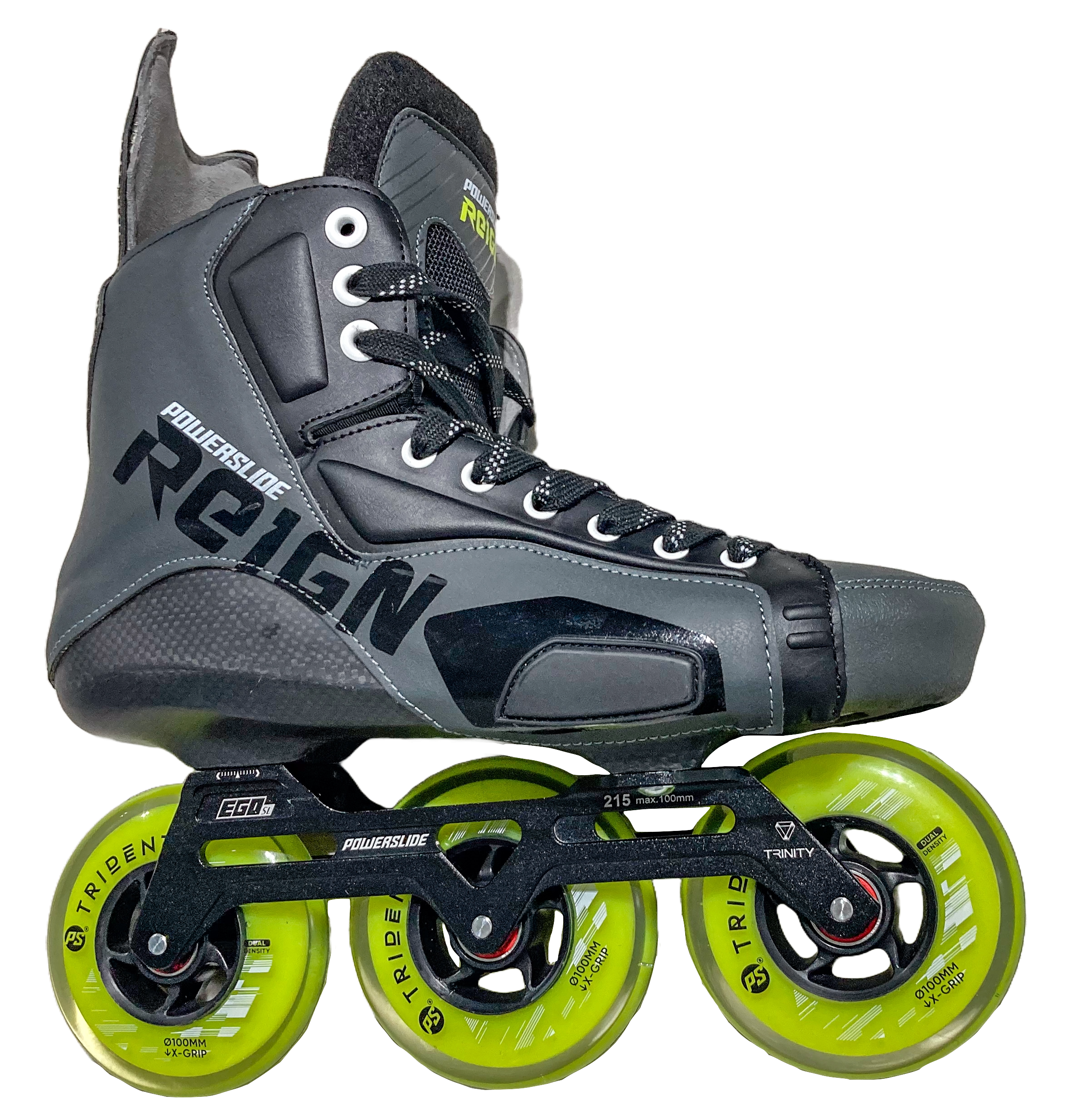
A Trinity boot & frame

The 165mm standard, originally from speed skating, has dominated since the mid-1990s, except in aggressive (UFS) and hockey (riveted) skates. But its small mount area can cause frame wobble on boots without stiff soles or reinforced platforms. As larger wheels became popular, 165mm frames adapted with taller designs or altered wheel placement to fit bigger wheels. Some raised frame height, reducing stability, while others downsized or shifted middle wheels to avoid bolt interference. Some brands shifted mount platforms, leading to front-back centering issues when mixing boots and frames. Introduced in 2003, the 195mm standard supported larger wheels without raising frame height or altering wheel placement. However, its extended front-to-back spacing exceeded the optimal "heel-to-ball" length, requiring ultra-stiff soles not found outside the speed skating market until the late 2010s, limiting adoption to carbon-fiber speed boots.

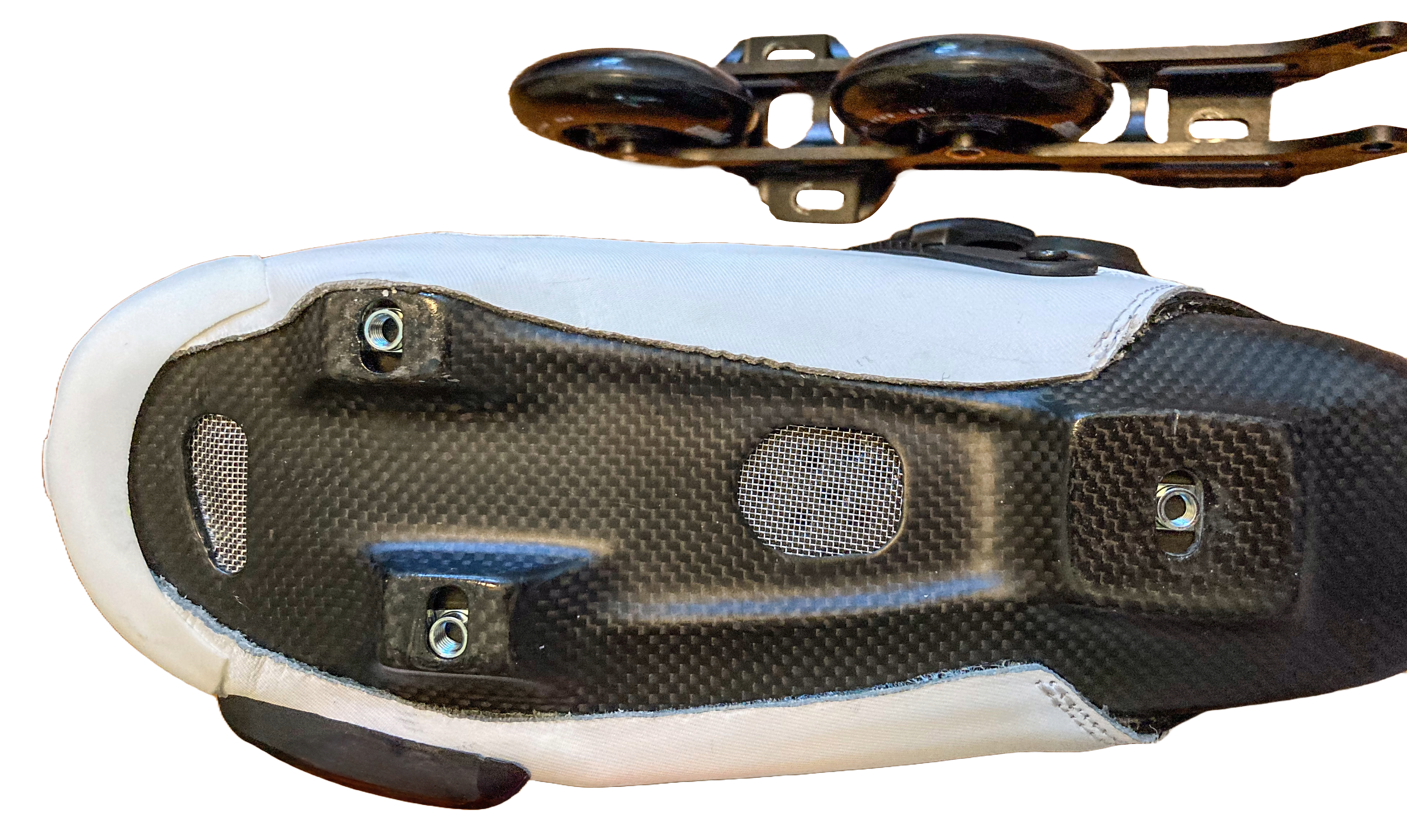
Trinity mounts

In 2016, Powerslide introduced the Trinity mounting system to support modern wheel setups while addressing the limitations of the 165mm and 195mm standards. Unlike two-point systems, Trinity uses three mounts. The two front bolts are offset, placed beside the centerline to allow front wheels to sit closer to the sole. The rear mount, located under the heel, is raised by 10 mm to clear the rear wheels and create a heel raise similar to the 165mm standard. The three bolts form a triangular layout measuring 150 mm, 135 mm, and 55 mm. This design aligns with foot anatomy for improved heel-to-ball support and structural stability.

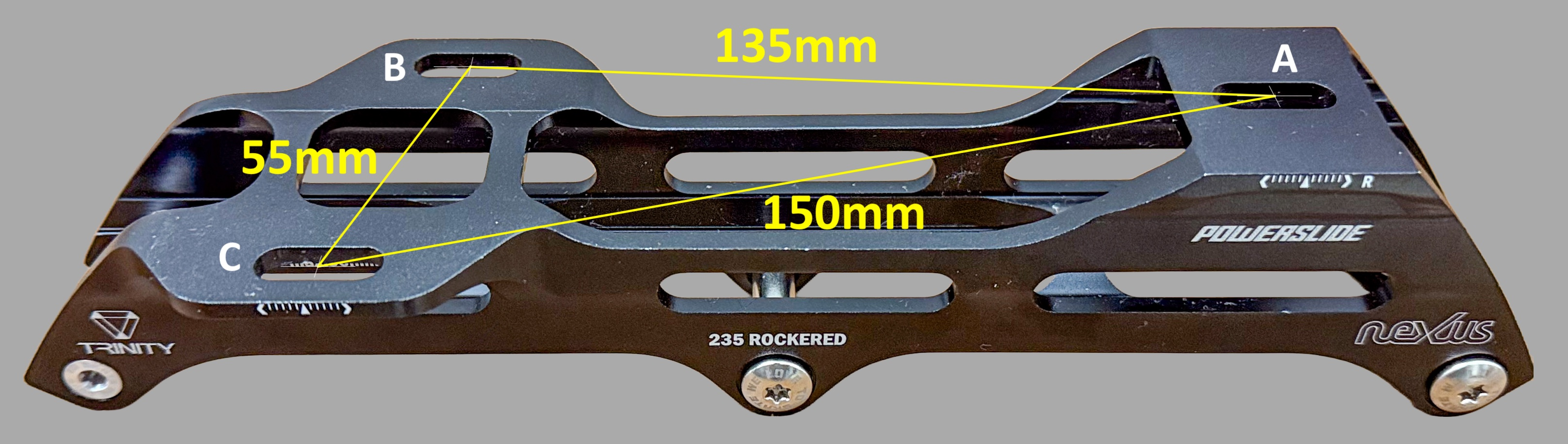
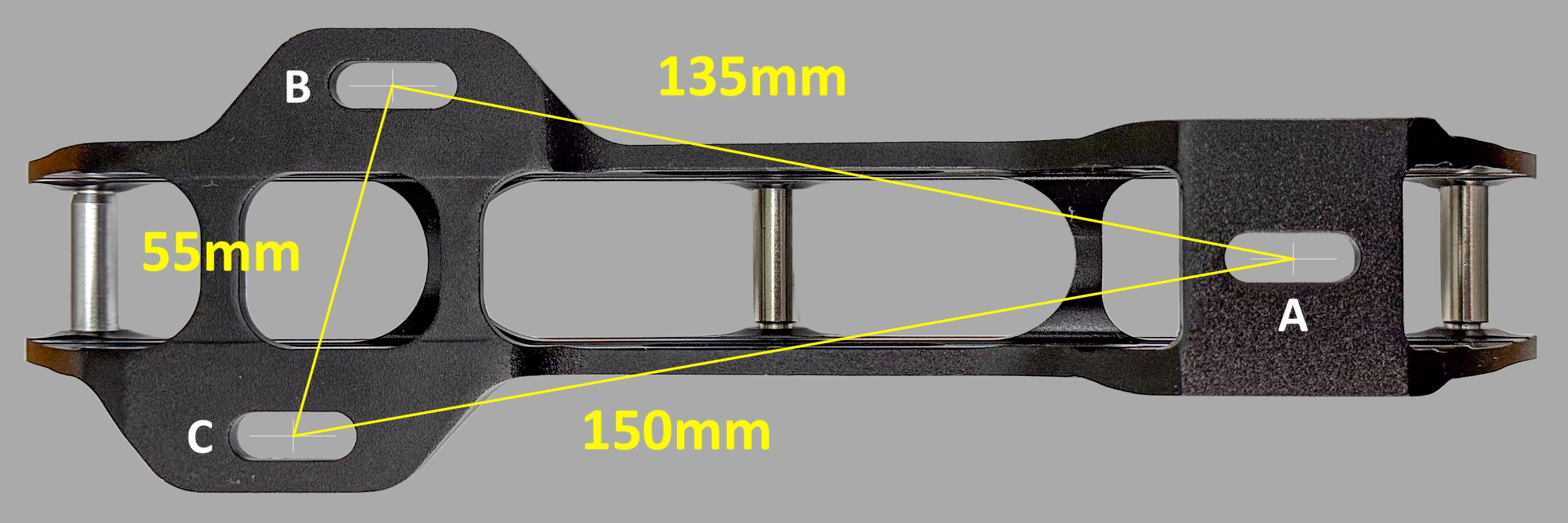

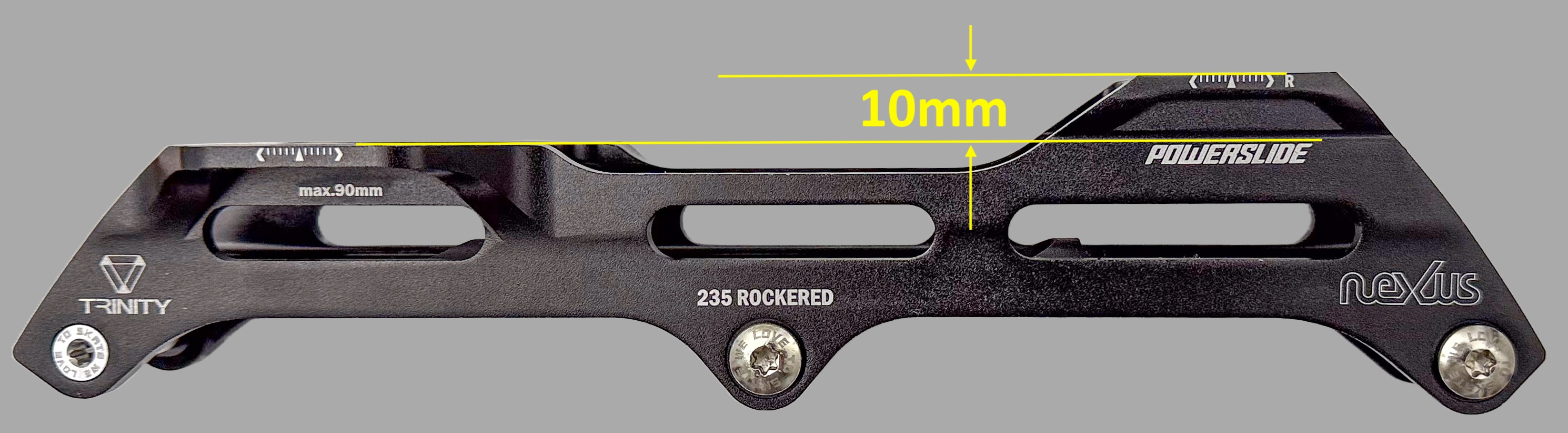
Trinity specifications

A Trinity frame typically wobbles less than 165mm or 195mm frames on similarly stiff boots. Unlike 165mm setups, which rely on the sole acting as a cantilever around central bolts, Trinity distributes support across the full width of the ball of the foot, similar to a hockey blade holder. This wider support reduces cantilever stress, improving power transfer and edge support.

A Trinity frame typically has a lower front mount height than its 165mm counterpart when using the same wheel setup. This is because the front mount of a Trinity frame can be positioned significantly lower than the tops of the front wheels due to its open centerline, allowing the front of the boot to be moved as close to the ground as the front wheels allow. This lowers the skate's center of gravity, improving control and stability.

=== Heel brakes and toe stops ===
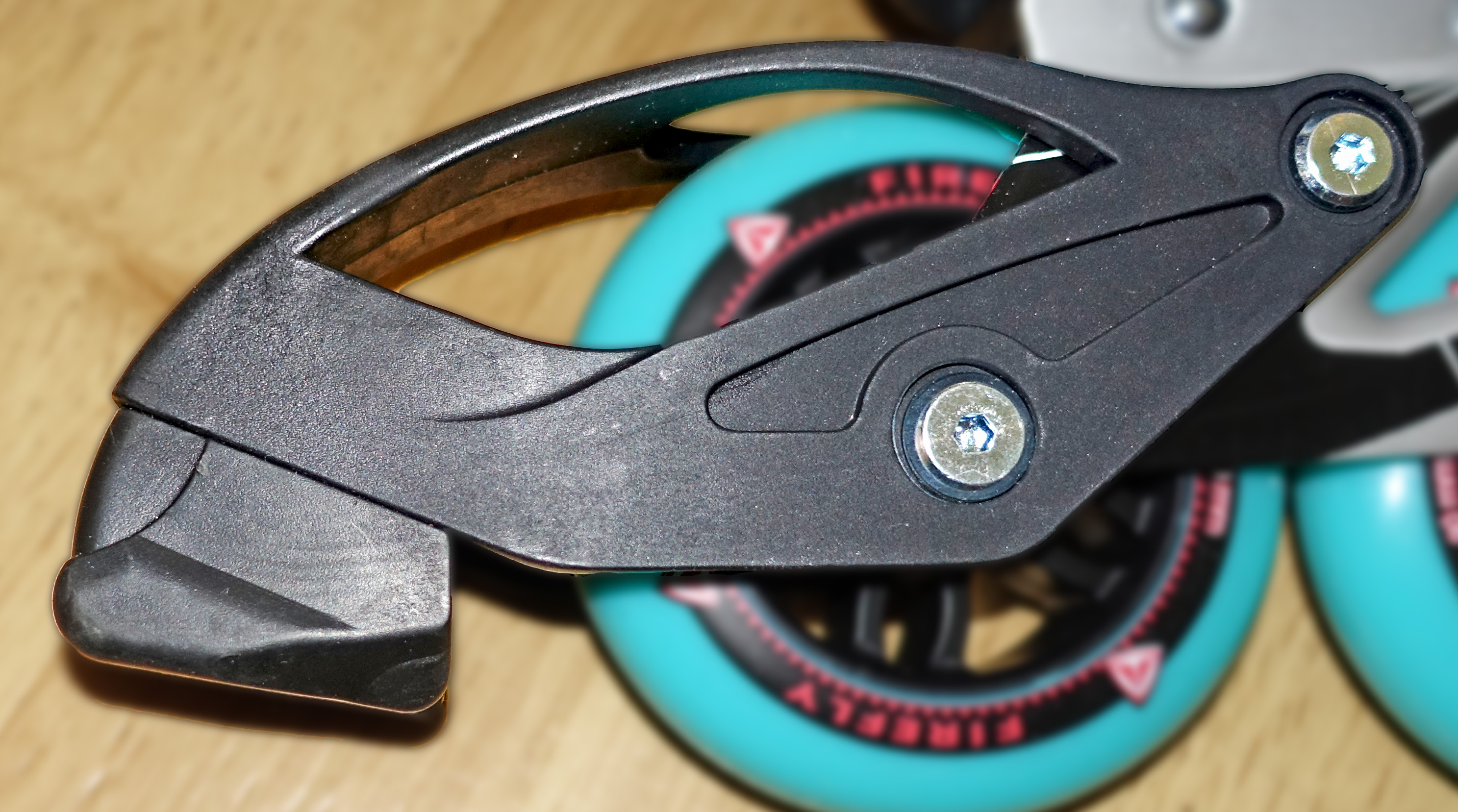
Heel brake

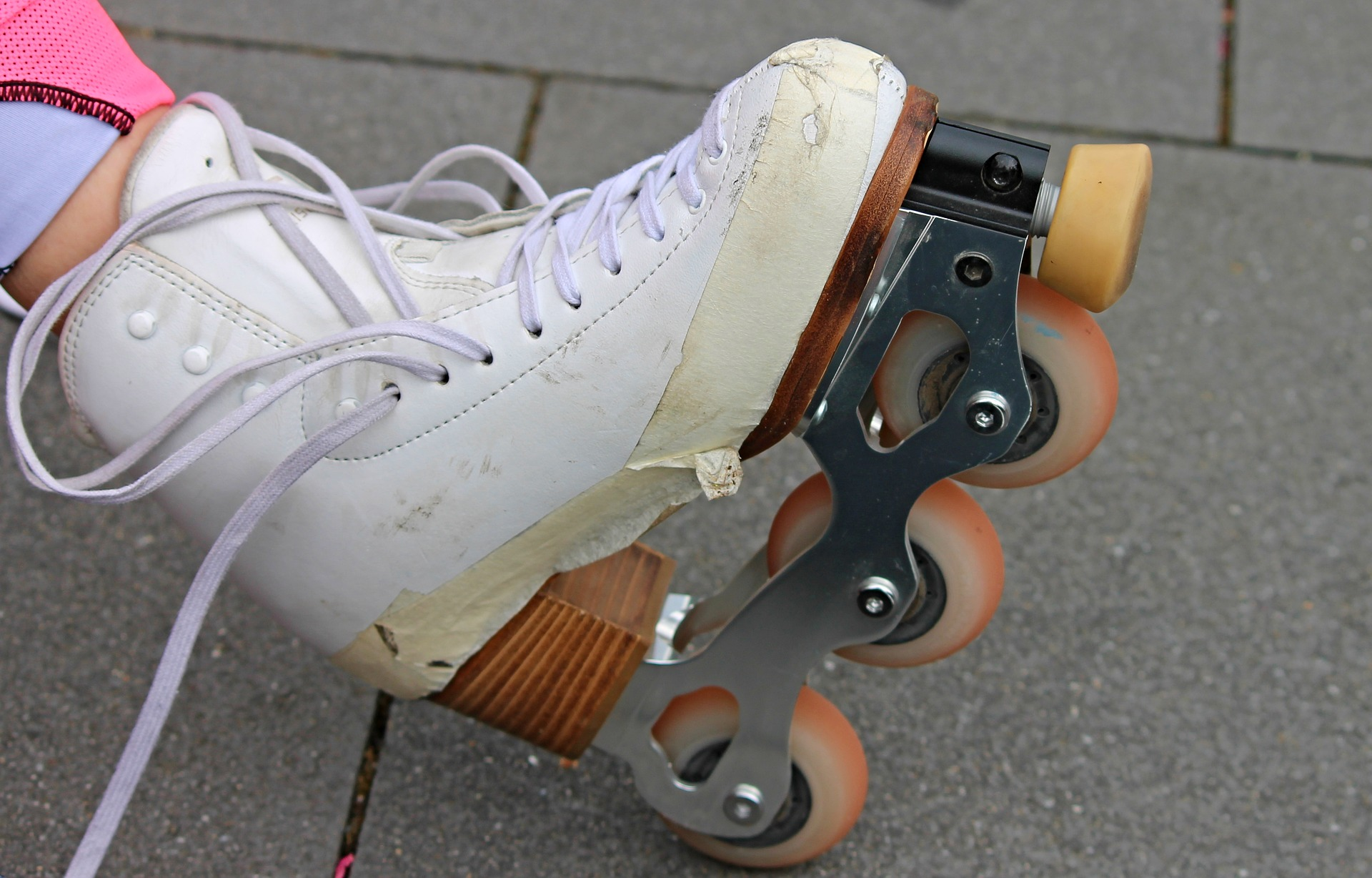
Toe stop

A heel brake is a hard rubber stopper attached to the back of the frame that lets skaters stop by lifting their toes and pressing the brake to the ground. It is especially important for beginners, offering a simple way to stop quickly and control downhill speed. Recreational and fitness skates usually include one brake, mountable on either skate, with most righthanded skaters choosing the right.

Heel brakes can interfere with advanced techniques like crossover turns, which are essential in hockey and speed skating. They also hinder freestyle slalom tricks and aggressive grinds. As a result, skates made for racing, hockey, slalom, and aggressive skating typically do not include a heel brake. Some urban skates include an unattached brake, while others cannot support one at all. Many experienced skaters remove heel brakes after learning other stopping methods, such as the "T-stop", which uses friction from dragging one skate behind the other. However, these techniques wear down wheels, so some skaters prefer slalom moves and controlled turns to avoid obstacles and reduce wear.

Inline figure skates are unique among inline designs in that they use a "toe stop" instead of a heel brake. Toe stops are essential for performing many artistic roller skating moves and jumps.

== Wheels ==
=== Polyurethane wheels ===
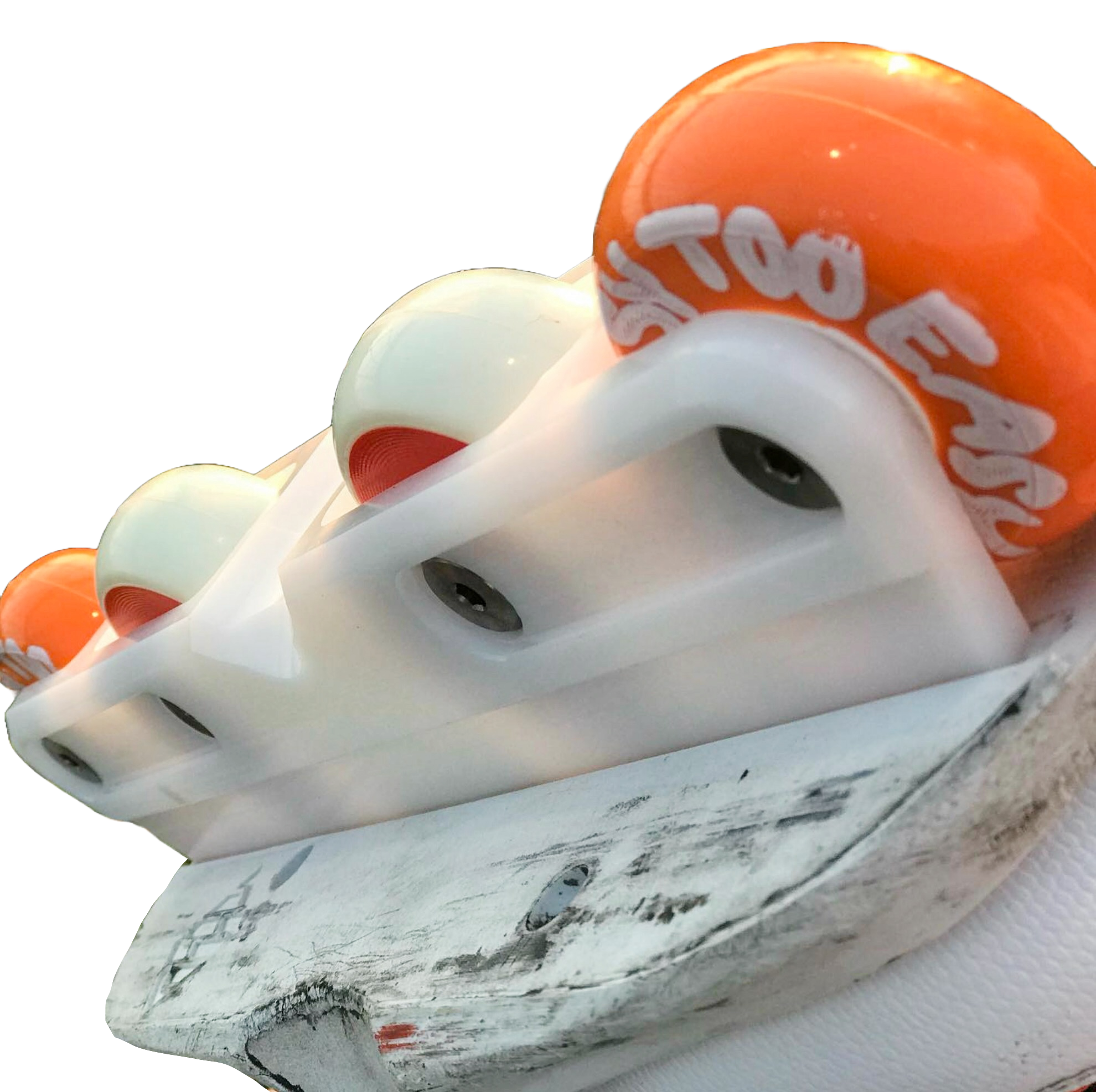
Small & hard wheels

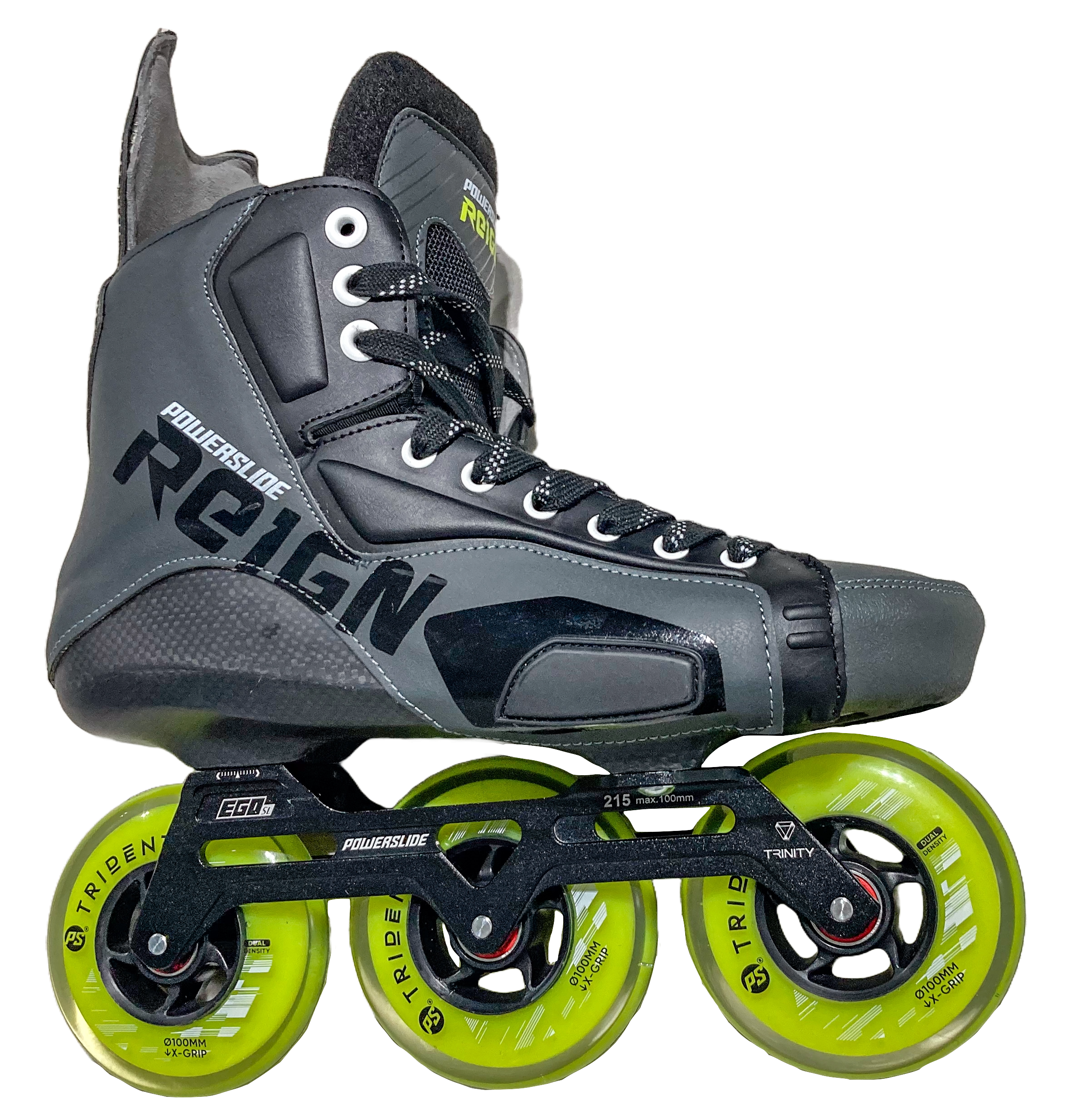
large & soft wheels

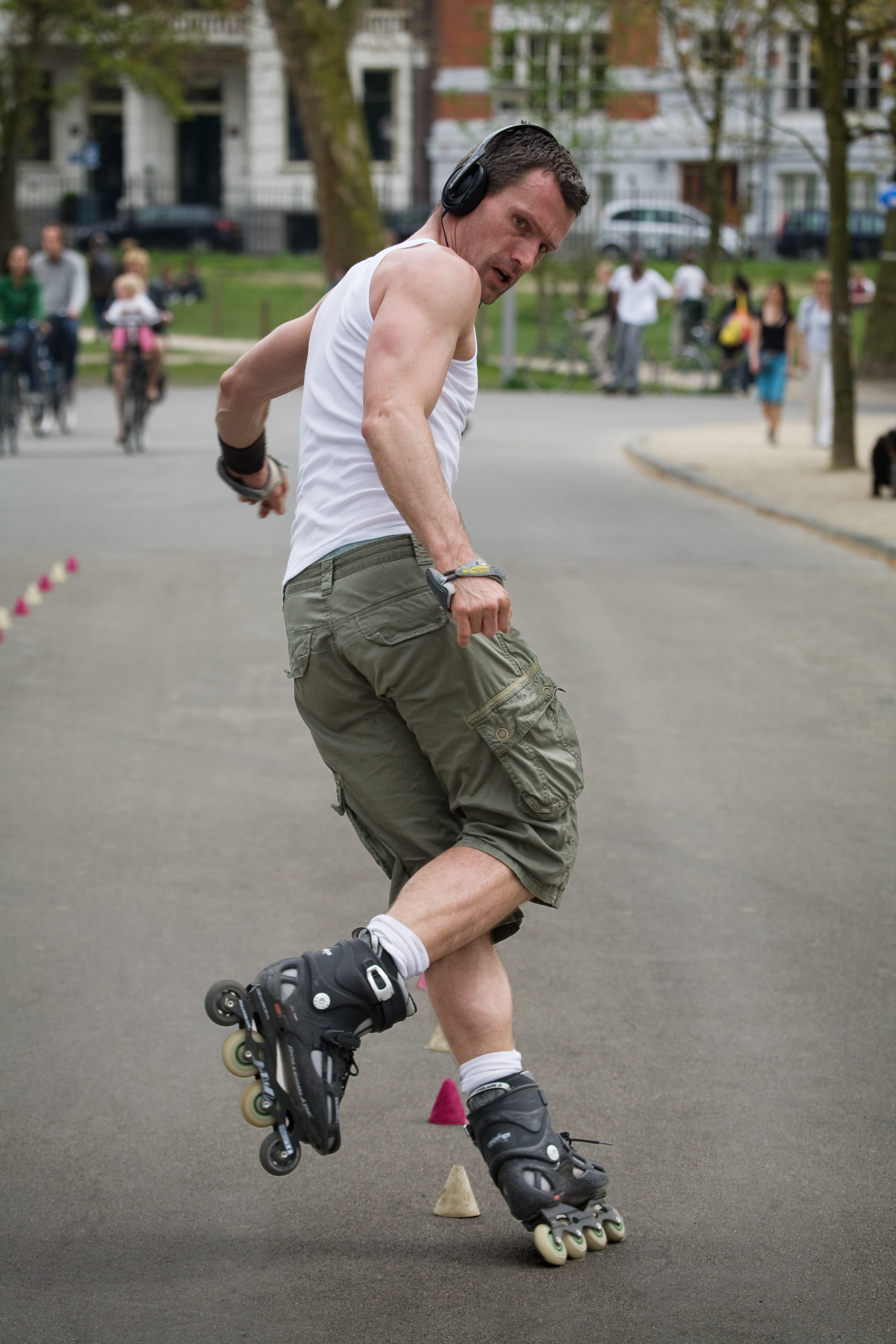
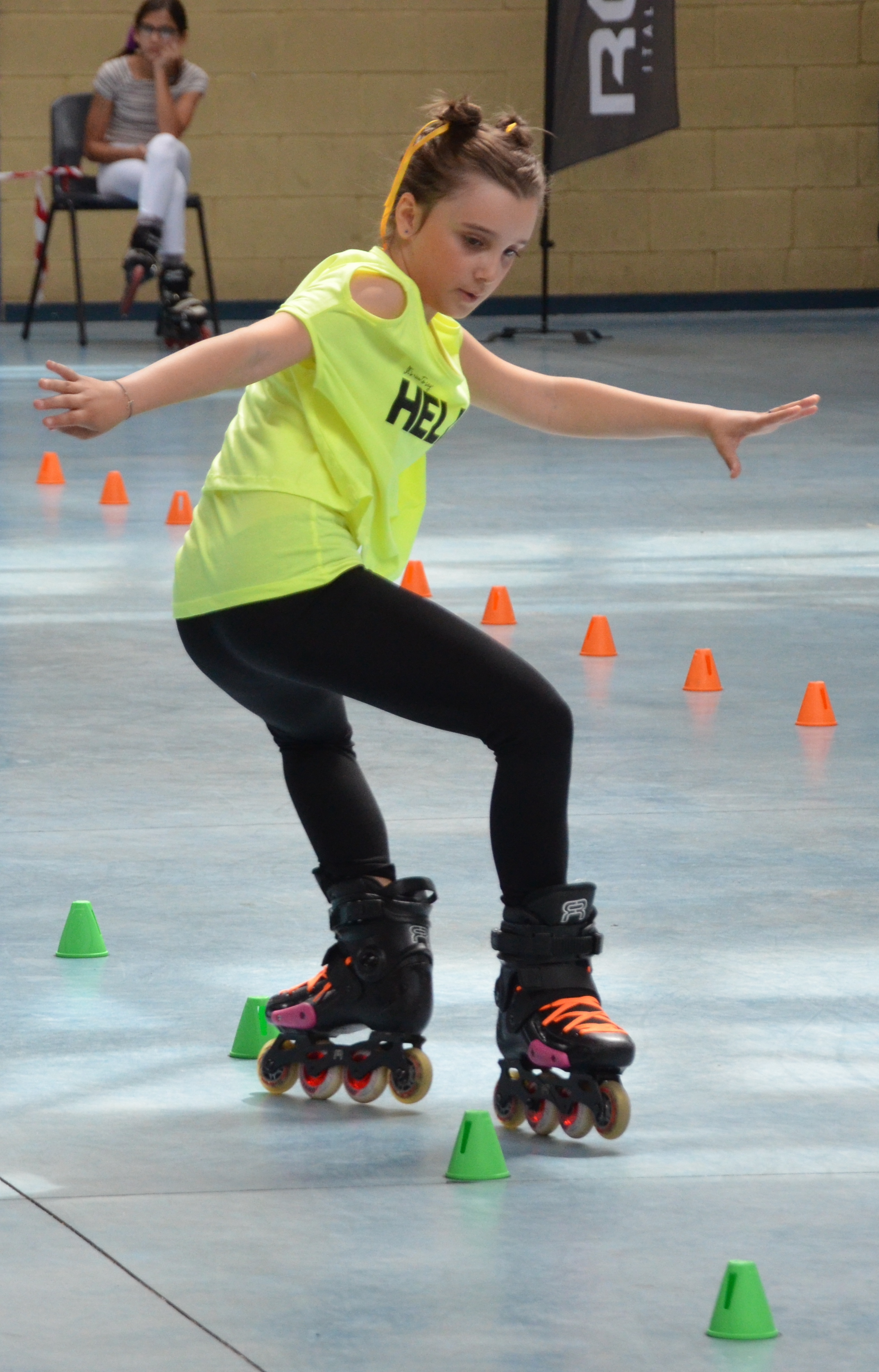
Rebound improves performance

Modern inline wheels are made of polyurethane (also PU or urethane), a versatile elastomer that transformed skating. It can be molded into any shape and customized for color, hardness, grip, and elasticity, enabling specialized wheels for various skating disciplines. (Note: Ricardo Lino toured the factory floor of Aend Industries, a polyurethane wheel factory, with co-owner Tony Gabriel. Discussions cover all aspects of wheel-making, including history of the company, co-ownership with Neil Piper, machines bought from Tom Peterson, brands they OEM for, injection molding of hubs (cores), trimming of hubs, polyurethane coloring, urethane bonding, dual-density urethane, hardness vs grippiness, hardness vs profile, heating of urethane before pouring, casting urethane into molds, baking after casting, cutting/shaving wheels to final profile, quality control, washing, printing, and packaging.) Polyurethane offers high elasticity, or wheel rebound, without compromising other properties. This rebound helps convert stride energy into acceleration, benefiting all types of inline skating. (Note: See table in the Gallagher article showing polyurethane compounds with varying hardness from 60A to 95A and varying rebound values (Bayshore Resilience) from 25% to 60%, with no correlations. A YouTube video (archived) from the article demonstrates "polyurethane resilience" tests (yet another name for Bayshore Resilience) showing two balls with the same hardness, but opposite rebound values. At 0:41, an inline skate wheel with high rebound was shown bouncing off the floor.)

Before polyurethane, roller skates and skateboards used "composition wheels" made from clay or rubber mixed with fibers. (Note: Roller Derby made clay composition wheels in the 1960s for their "sidewalk surfboards" (skateboards). The same wheels were used in their Royal Sidewalk line of roller skates as late as 1974 (archived catalog page). By 1978, however, the same Royal Sidewalk line adopted polyurethane wheels under the brand Fireball (archived catalog page). See archived entry and images of this Etsy listing showing a pair of Royal Sidewalk skates with these clay wheels: listing page, image 1, and image 2.) In the early 1970s, roller skaters tested polyurethane wheels but found them too grippy and slow for wooden rink floors, where composition wheels worked better. By the mid-1970s, skateboarders repurposed polyurethane wheels from roller skates, shaving them to fit. Their elasticity improved rides on rough surfaces and helped revive skateboarding after its decline in the late-1960s.

In the early 1980s, Scott Olson similarly repurposed polyurethane wheels from roller skates, shaving down tens of thousands to fit the skates sold by his company, Ole's Innovative Sports – later known as Rollerblade. The same qualities that made polyurethane wheels ideal for skateboarding, such as durability, impact resistance, and a smooth ride, also benefited inline skating. This innovation helped bring inline skating out of obscurity and transform it into a popular outdoor sport during the 1980s.

=== Wheel structure ===
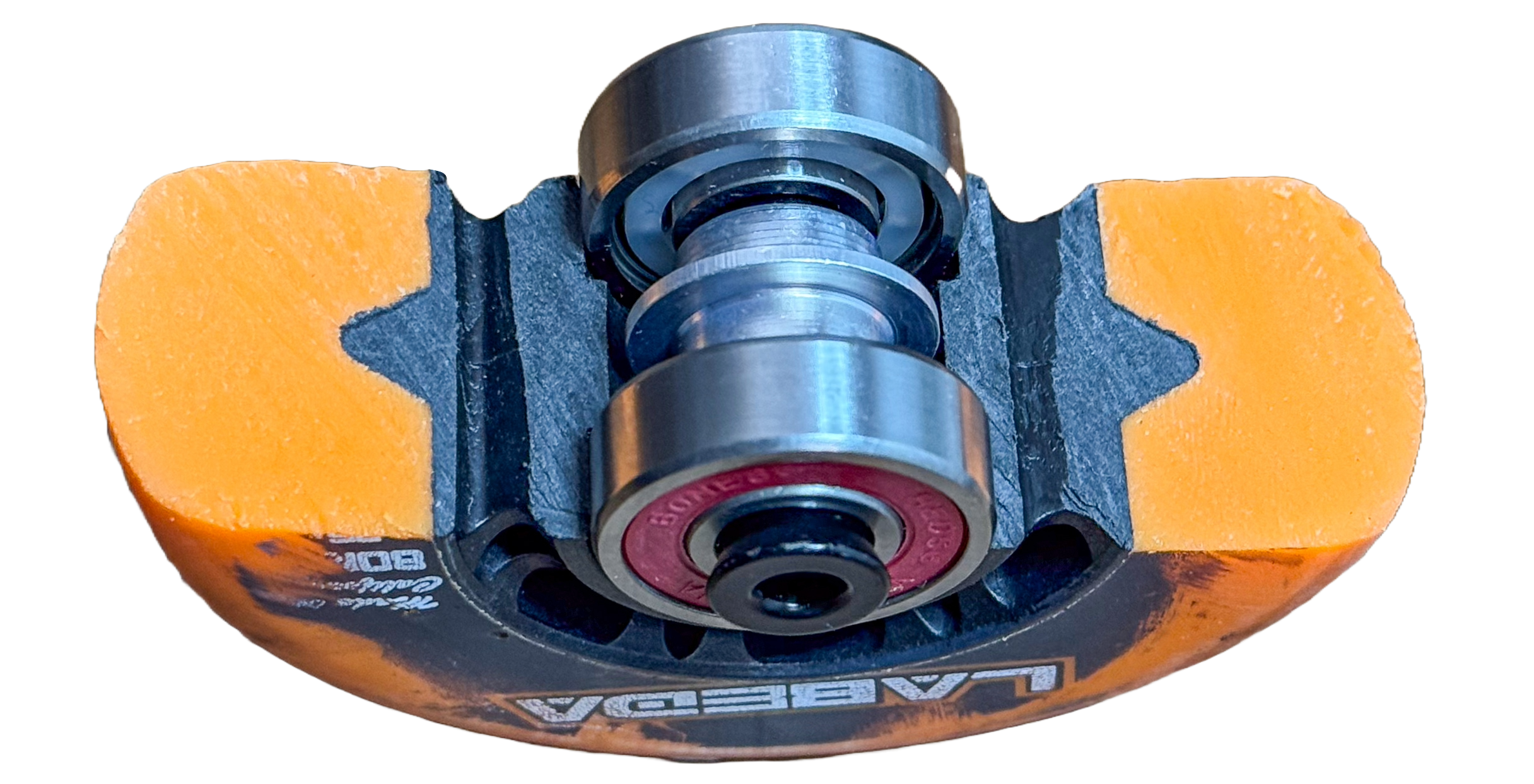
Wheel cross section

Modern inline wheels consist of two main components: an outer polyurethane tire, shaped like a donut, and an inner plastic hub, also known as a "core". The hub features a hollow center designed to accommodate a spacer and two ISO 608 ball bearings. Made of hard plastic, the hub securely holds the bearings in place through a friction fit - something the softer polyurethane tire cannot achieve. On the other hand, the soft polyurethane tire is able to deform upon ground contact, cushioning the landing and gripping the ground.

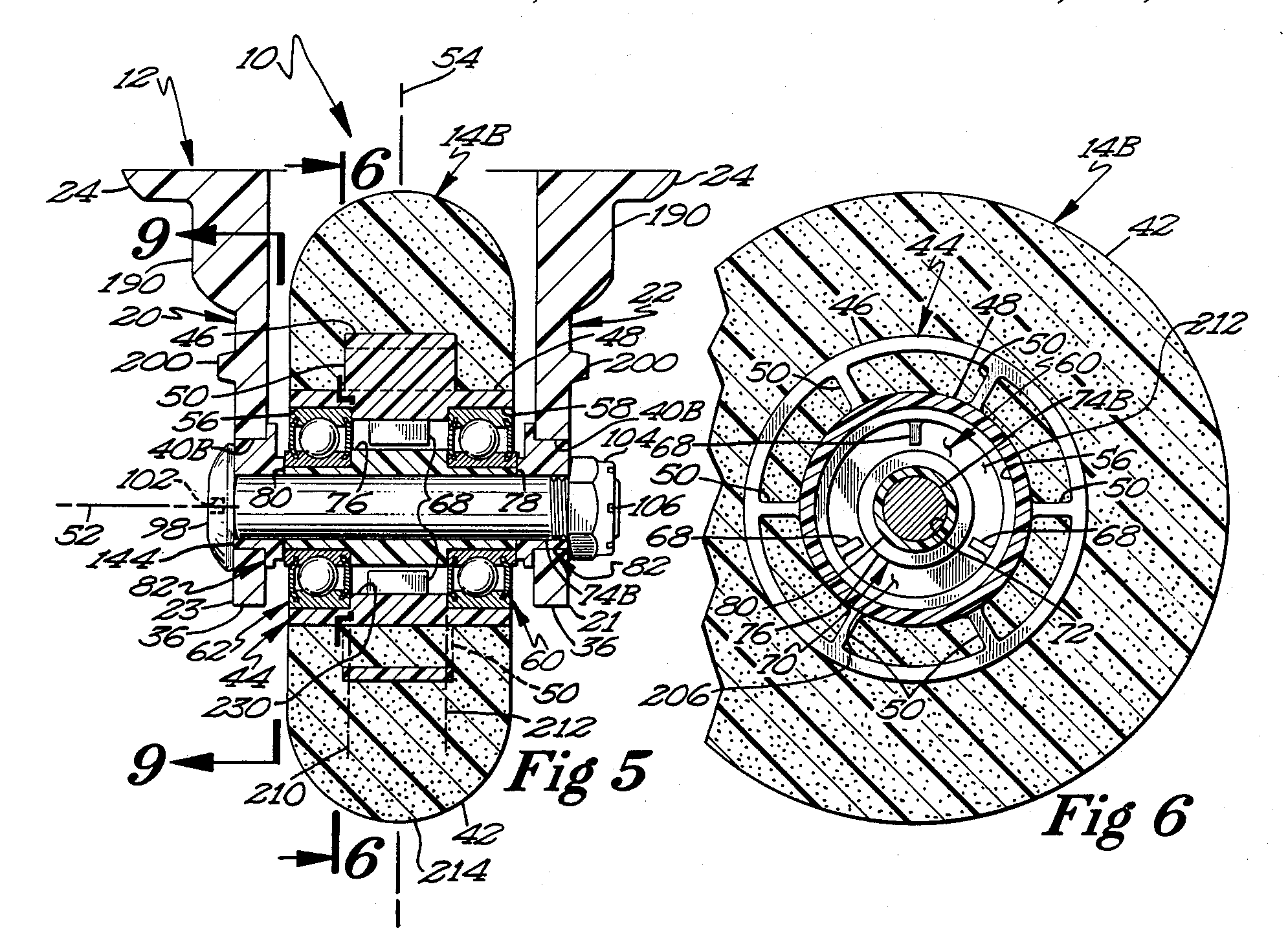
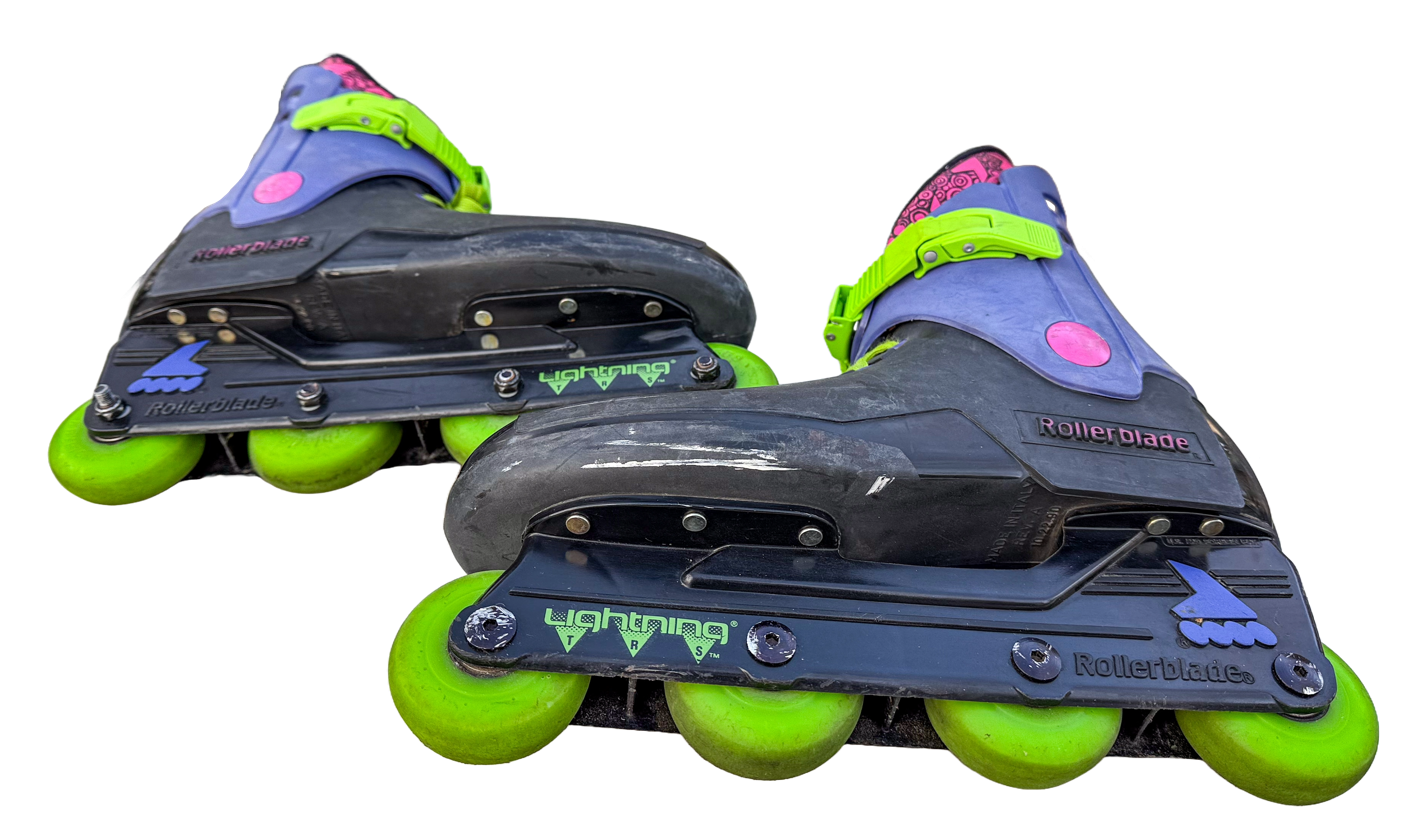
Polyurethane tire molded over a plastic hub - 1988 Rollerblade Lightning patent (left) and skate (right)

From the 1910s to the 1970s, many wheeled skates served as precursors to modern inline skates. Most of these early skates featured small wheels made of rubber or rubber reinforced with fibers, often with relatively simple constructions. In the 1980s, Rollerblade collaborated with Kryptonics to develop polyurethane wheels for inline skates. The inline industry adapted plastic hub innovations from roller skates, integrating them into inline wheels. These wheels were manufactured by placing a plastic hub at the center of a mold and then pouring molten polyurethane around it. The liquid polyurethane flowed into cavities and holes in the hub before settling. As it cooled and solidified, it formed a secure interlock with the hub. (Note: Page 79 of Skaters magazine from 1990 features a Kryptonics ad showing the cross section of a Kryptonics wheel with polyurethane molded over a hub through holes in its interlock rim. Page 77 of the same 1990 Skaters magazine features a Rollerblade ad stating that Kryptonics is the official wheel supplier for rollerblade skates.)

=== Wheel hubs ===
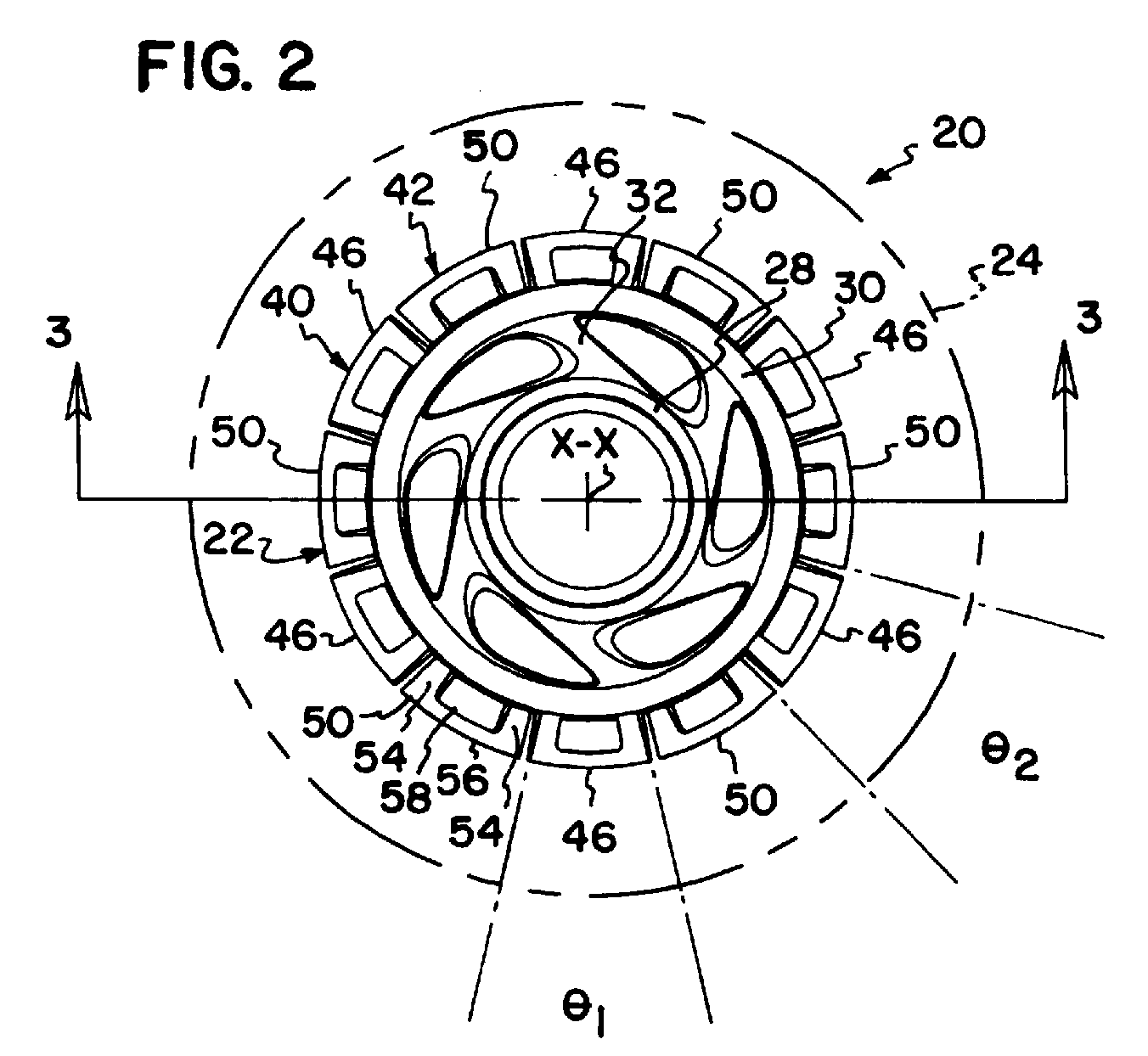
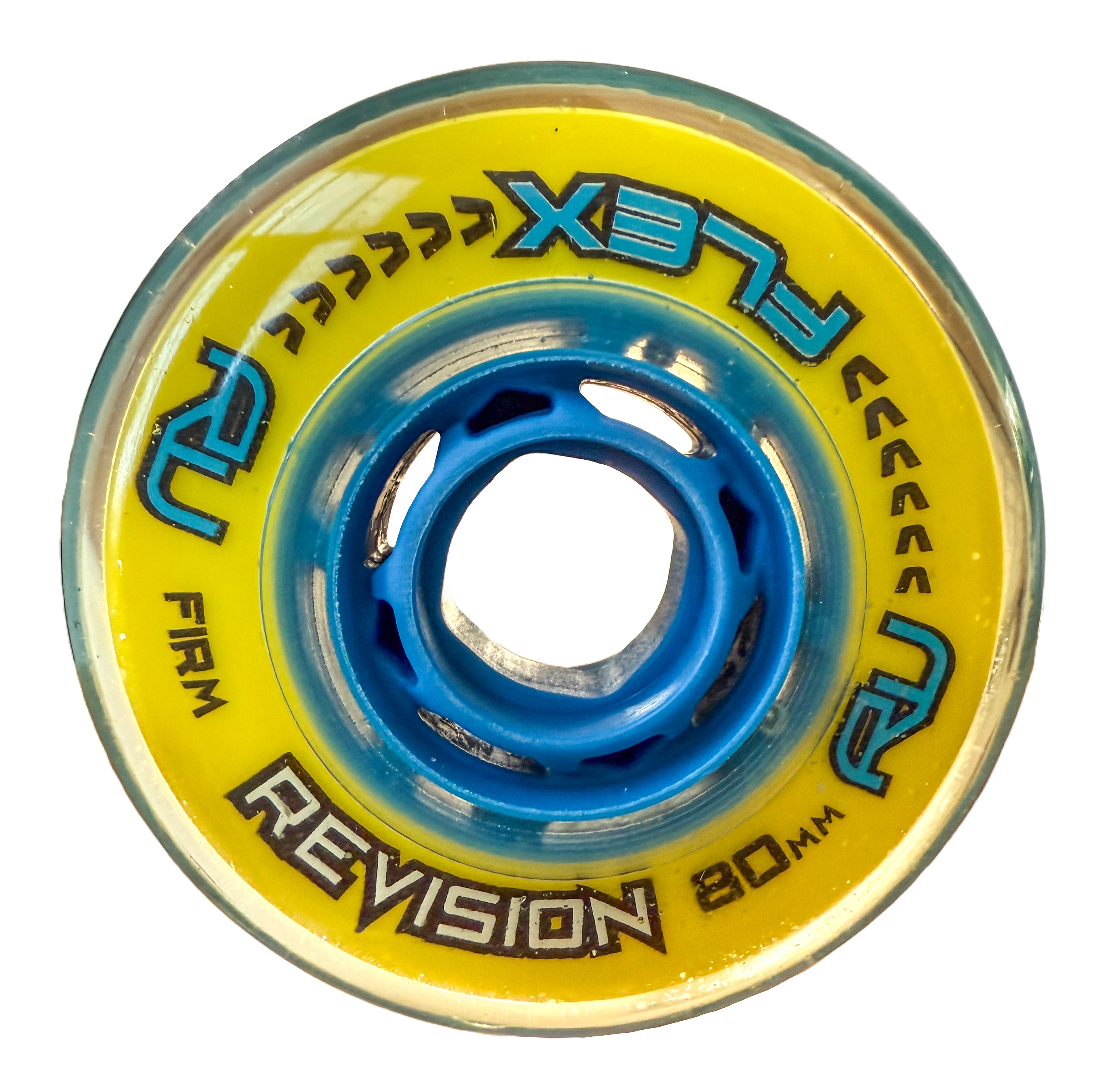
Clear polyurethane tire molded over interlock vanes of a plastic hub
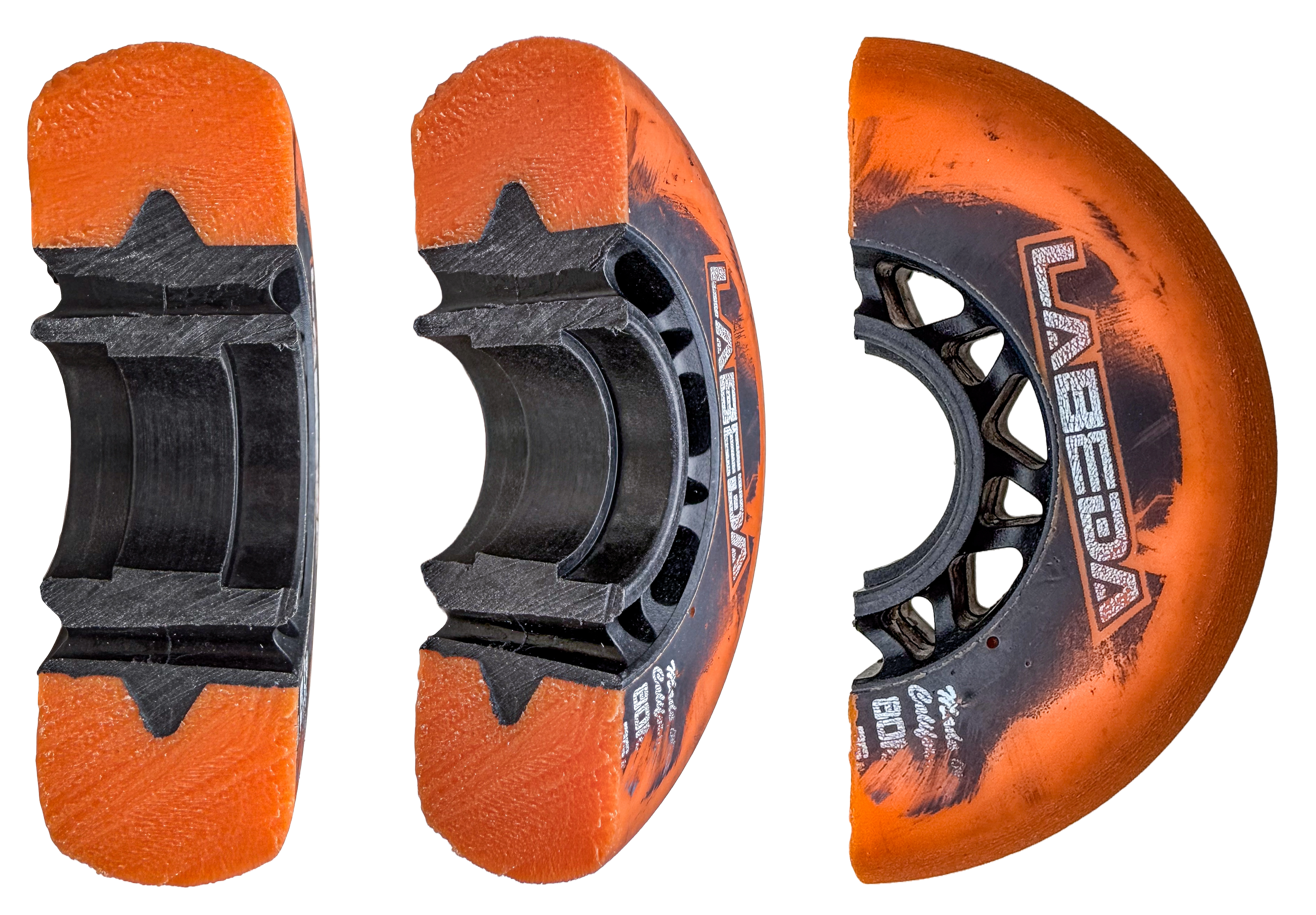
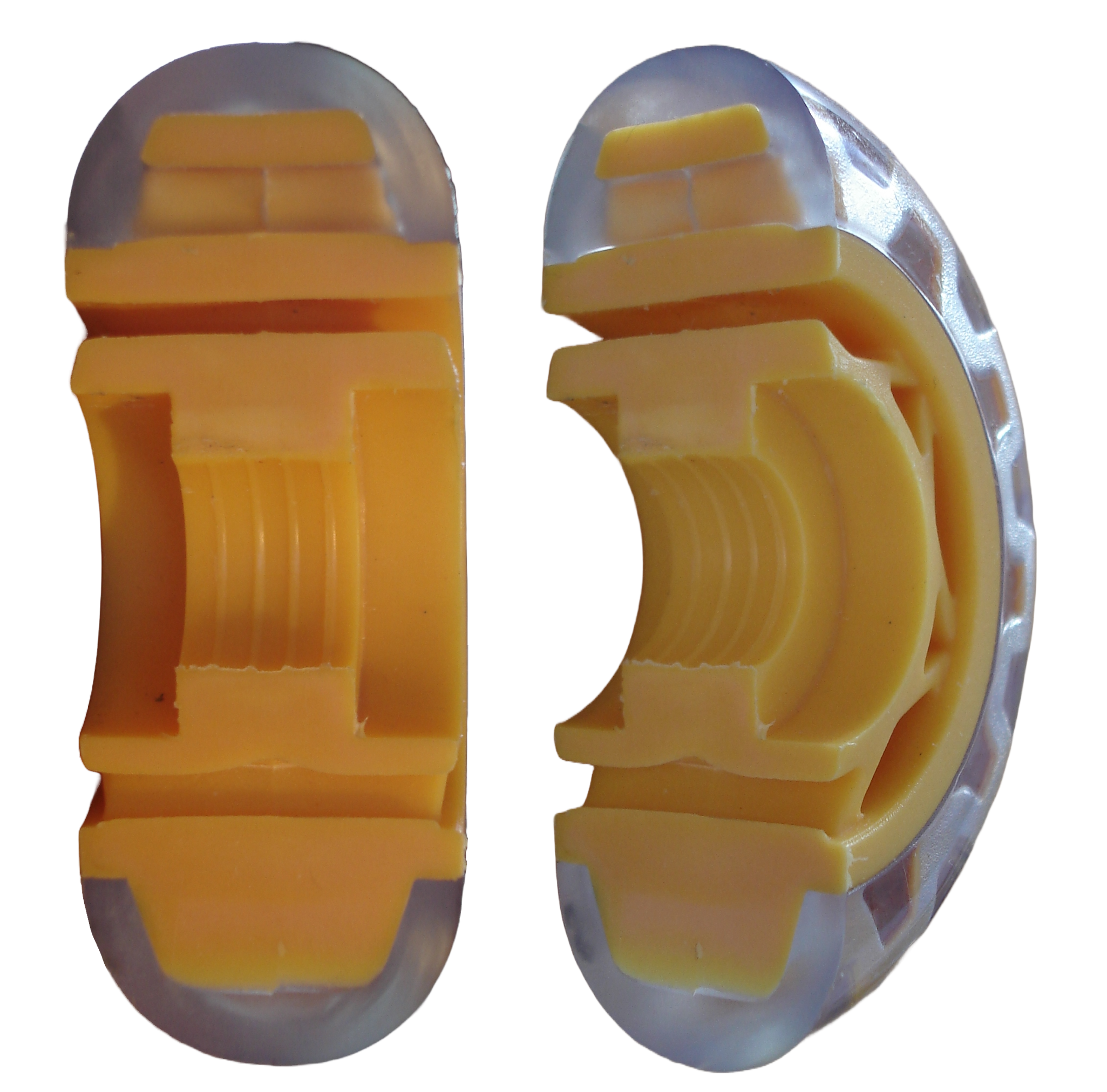
Chemically-bonded interlock rim (left) vs. mechanical interlock (right)

The outer rim of a wheel hub, known as the "interlock", is buried within the polyurethane tire. Unless the tire is made from clear urethane, this rim remains hidden from view. Beyond mechanically securing the tire to the hub, the interlock rim also enhances the wheel's overall structural rigidity. (Note: Brennan Olson's 1987 patent described wheels with polyurethane poured over a hub with an interlock rim (outer rigid ring 46), and showed drawings of the same.) Some manufacturers apply a bonding agent to the hub before pouring the polyurethane, creating a chemical bond that reduces reliance on mechanical interlocking. Others use polyurethane-blended plastic hubs that bond chemically with the polyurethane tire during molding.

The visible hub size varies with wheel dimensions and skating discipline. In small aggressive wheels, the hub is just a thin ring housing the bearings. In contrast, 82 mm racing wheels from the 1990s had hubs taking up nearly half the diameter. By the 2020s, 110 to 125 mm wheels feature hubs that occupy most of the wheel's diameter.

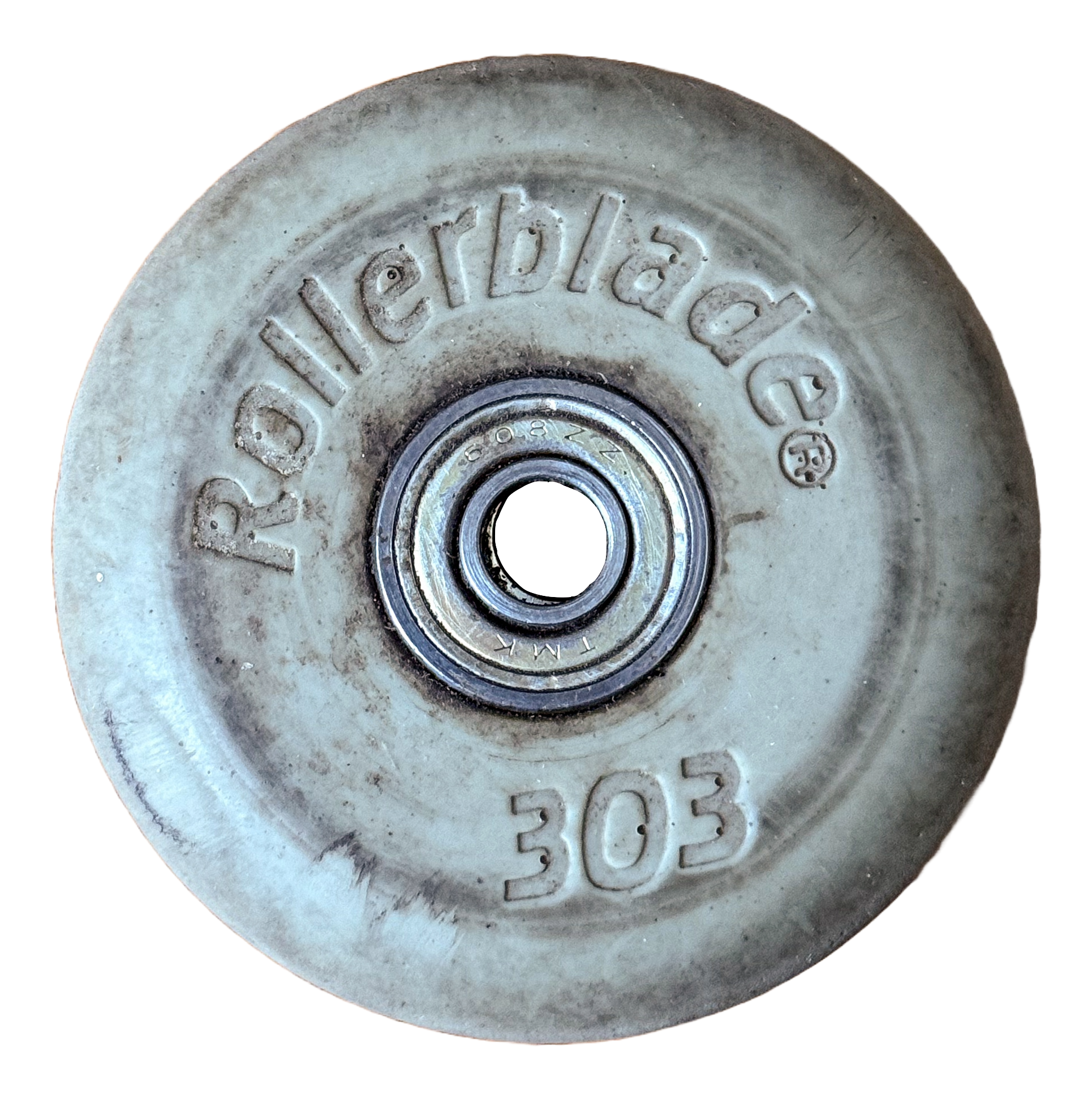
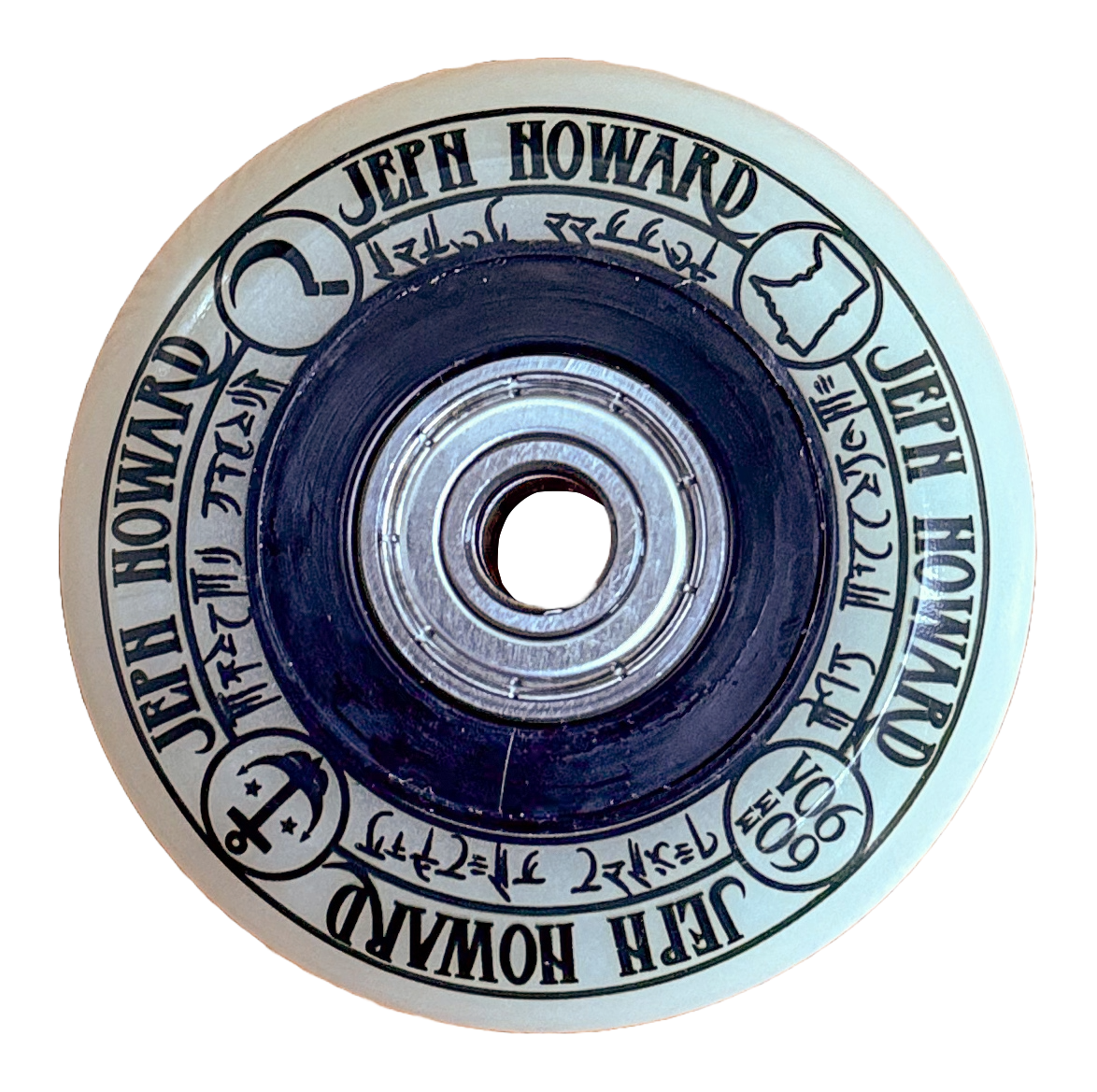
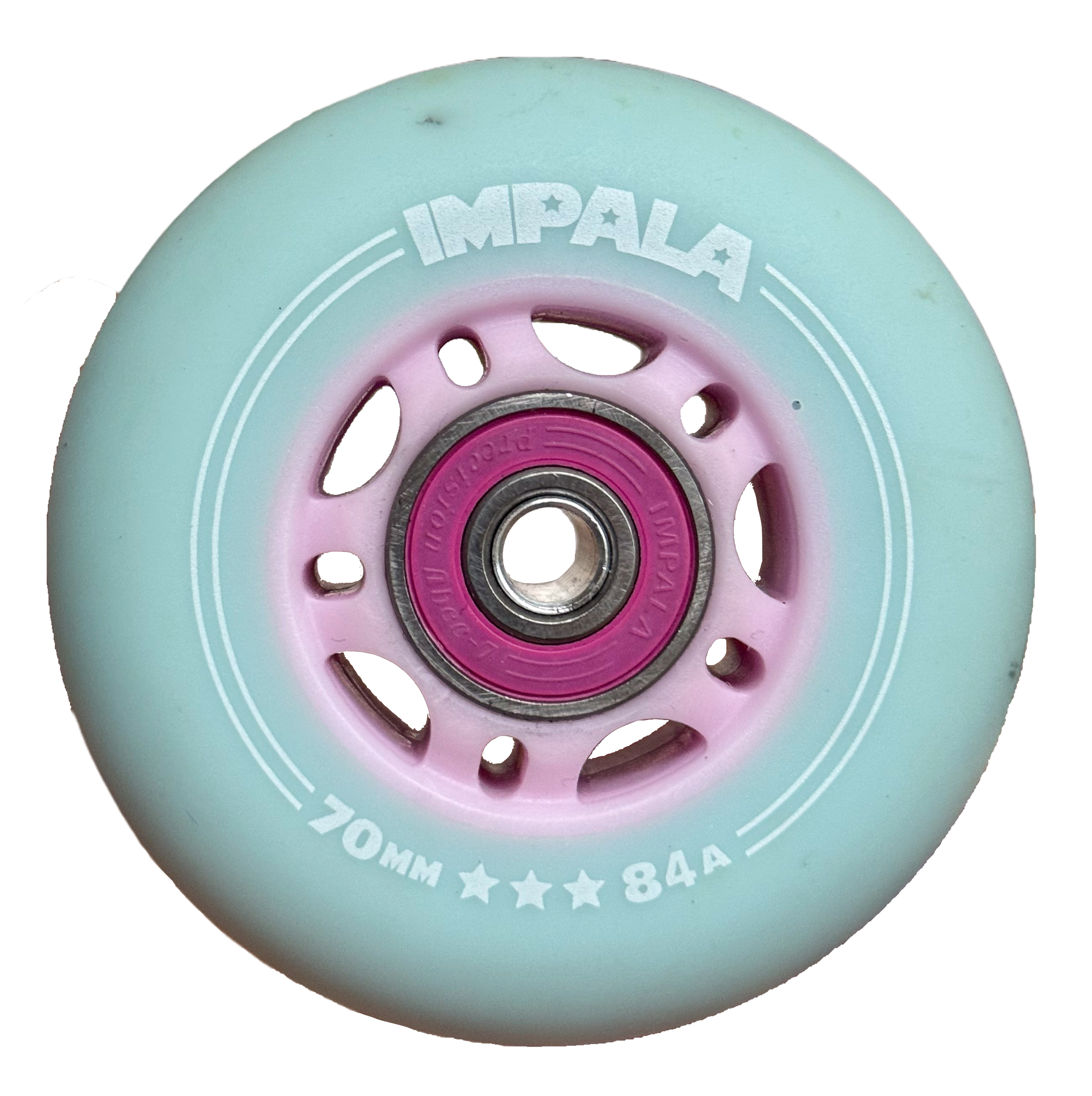
Hubless (no core), closed core & open

A wheel's volume grows with the square of its diameter given fixed width. Large solid wheels would be too heavy for inline skating, so designers adopted stroller wheel concepts, using lightweight spoked hubs with interlock rims to hold the tire. These "spoked hubs", or "open cores", have an outer rim connected to the bearing housing by spokes. "Full hubs", or "closed cores", are solid discs with no visible separation. "Semi-open cores" fall in between, with solid discs and small hollows drilled to reduce weight.

Spoked cores are generally lighter than full cores but may offer reduced rigidity and structural integrity. Aggressive skaters prefer small wheels with robust full cores for durability during jumps and landings. Speed and marathon skaters use large wheels with spoked hubs, which allow air to circulate around the hub, and help cool the bearings. Without adequate heat dissipation, the polyurethane tire may soften, increasing deformation during rolling and potentially leading to separation from the hub.

=== Wheel diameter and profile ===
Common sizes and profiles

Inline skate wheels in the 2020s range from 55 mm to 125 mm in "wheel diameter", but the "wheel width" remains standardized at 24 mm. Frames are built for specific wheel setups, each fitting a set number of wheels of certain diameters, yet all assume a 24 mm "hub width". "Wheel profile" describes the shape of the contact surface when viewed head-on. Although any diameter can be matched with any profile, certain combinations work better for specific skating styles.

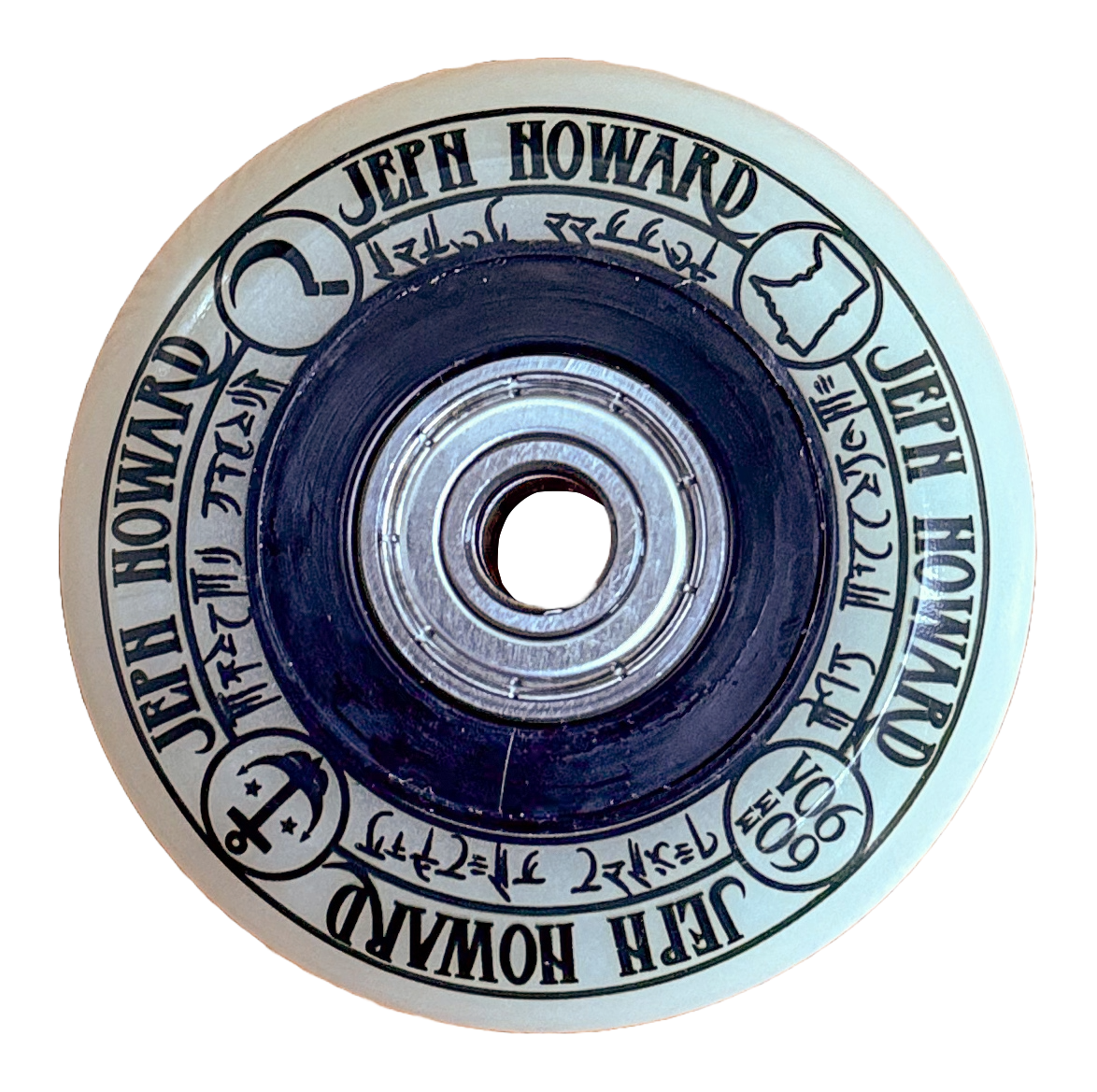
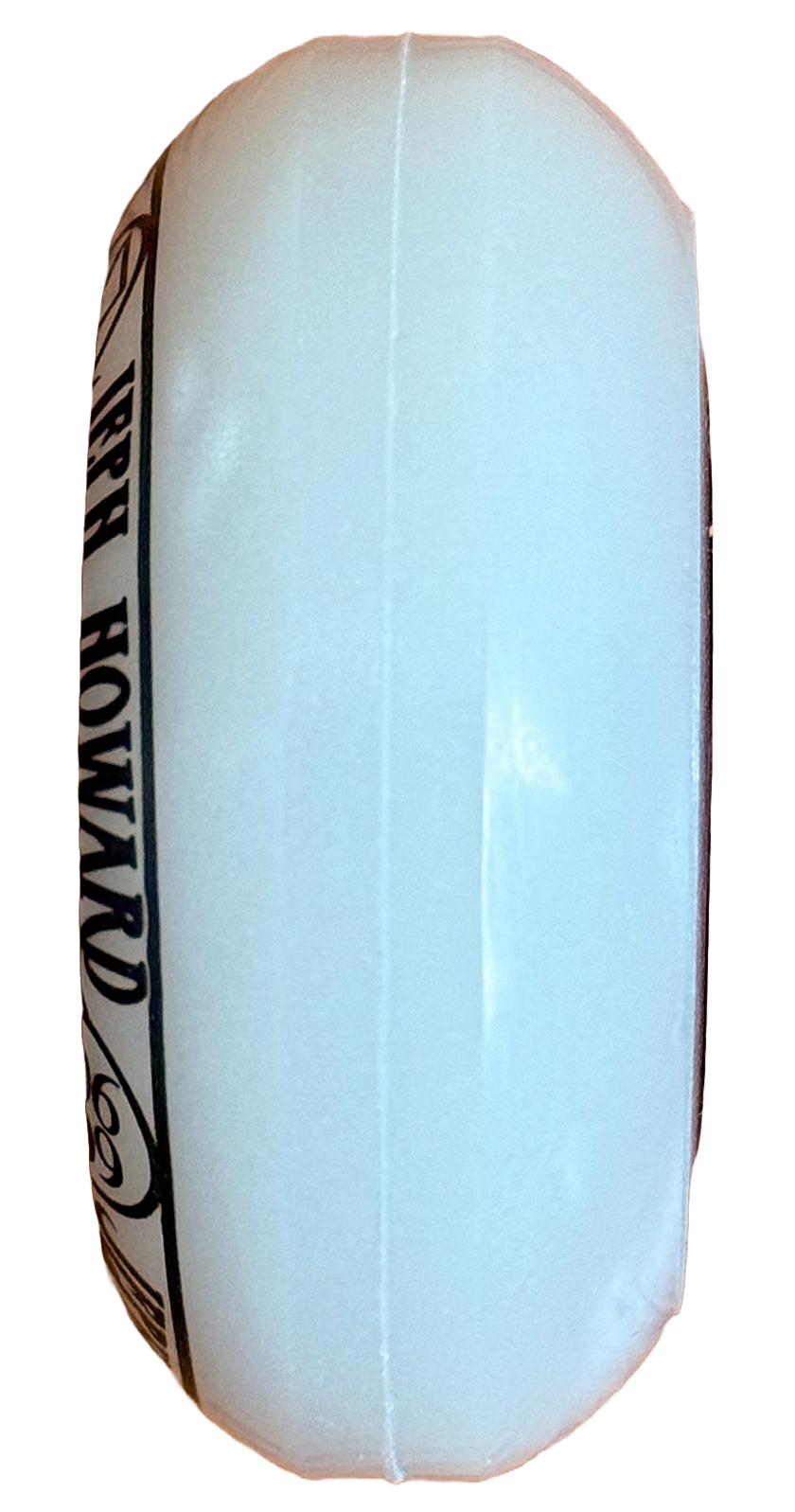
Flatish (60 mm)

"Small" wheels in aggressive skates, typically 55 to 64 mm in diameter, often have a "flat" contact profile resembling a rounded rectangle like car tires. This shape provides strong grip and stable upright rolling. While flat profiles were popular in the 1990s, modern aggressive skaters increasingly favor slightly rounder profiles for better balance between stability and maneuverability.

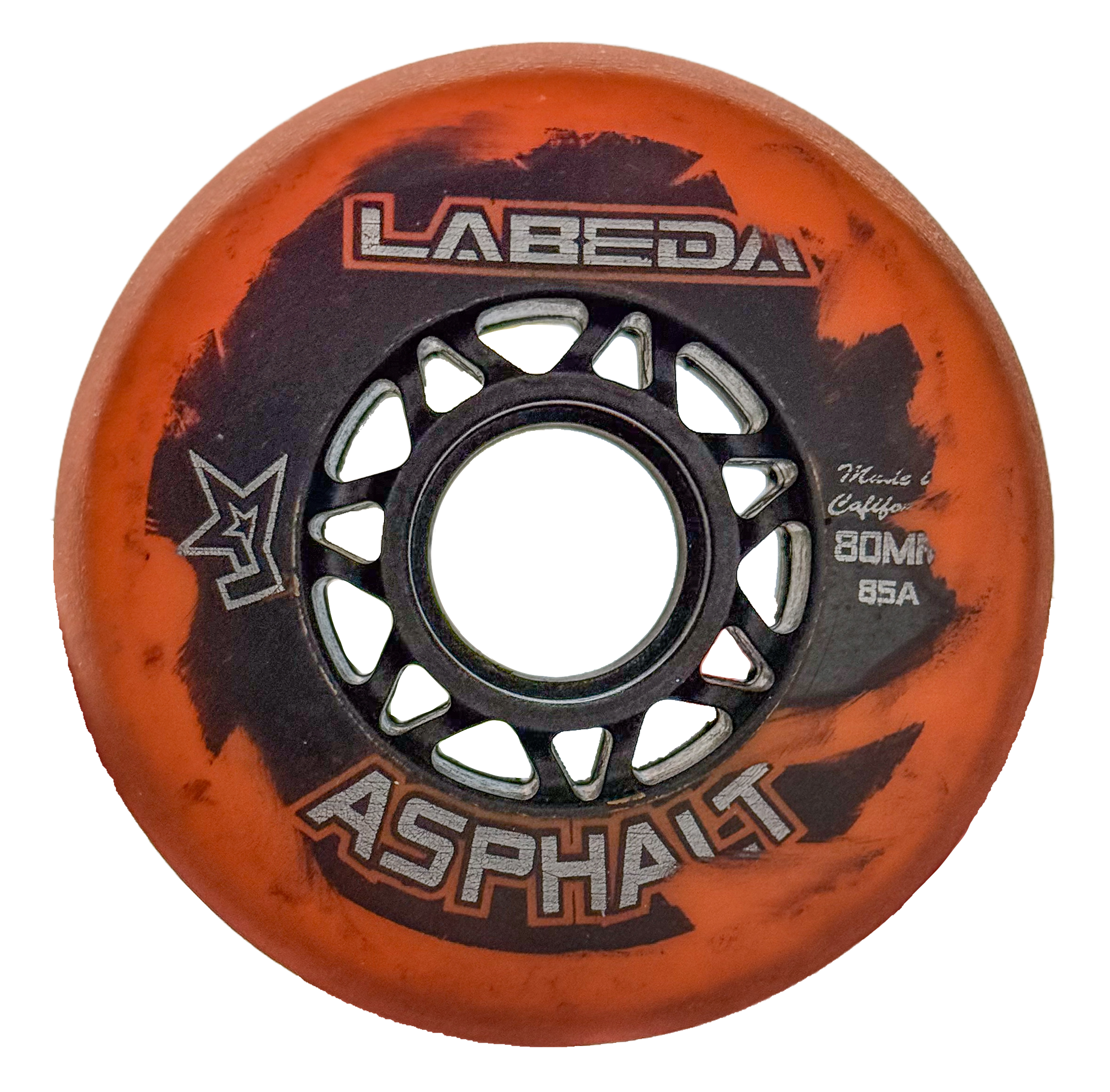
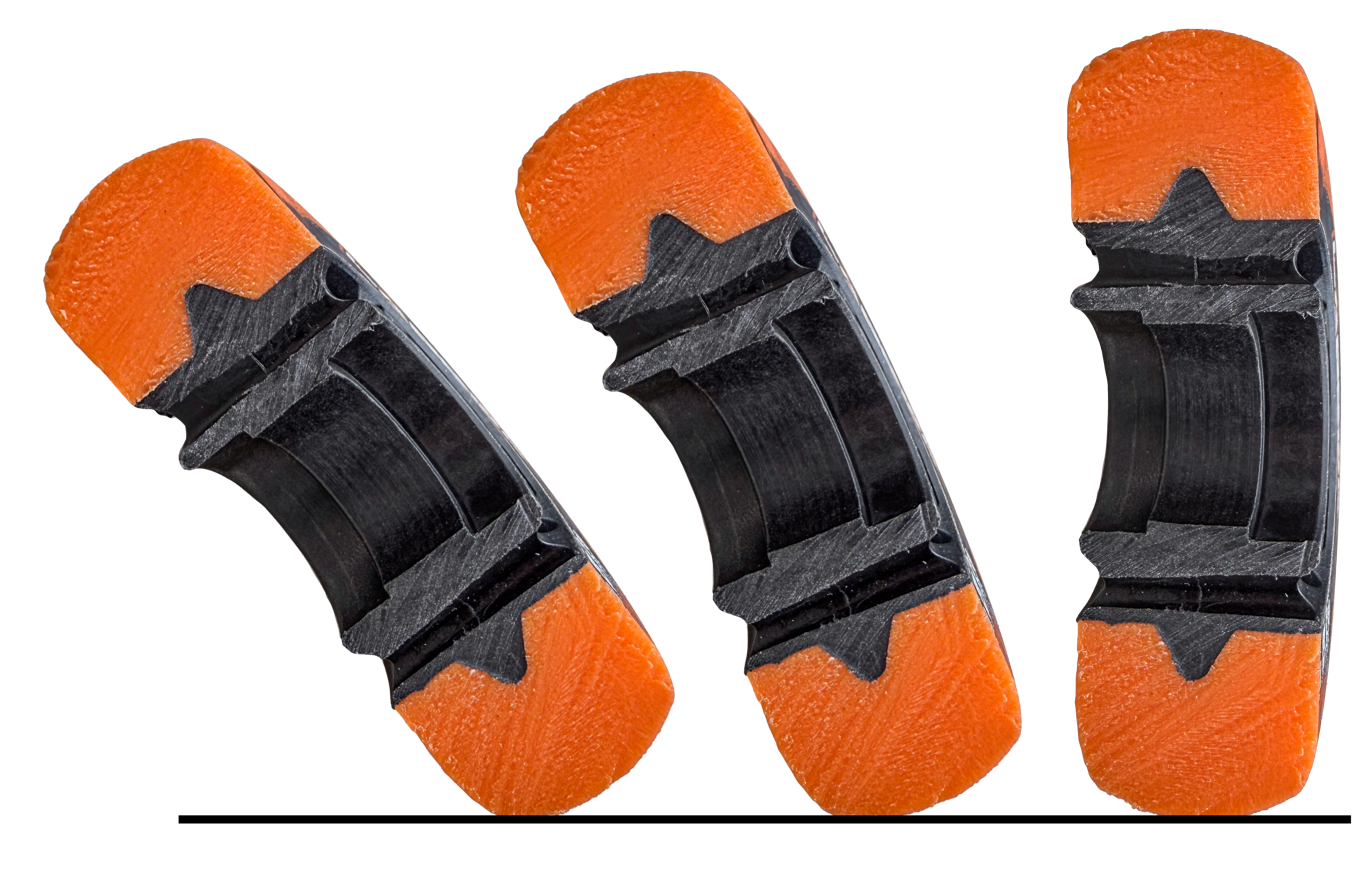
Round profile (80 mm) & edging angles

Most inline wheels are "medium-sized" with a "round" profile, since skaters often tilt their skates rather than always keeping them fully upright. Many techniques involve edging, or skating on the wheel sides, which requires a consistent contact surface at various angles. Round profiles support this, even if the contact area is smaller than that of flat wheels. Hockey and freestyle slalom skates often use round-profile wheels up to 80 mm in diameter.

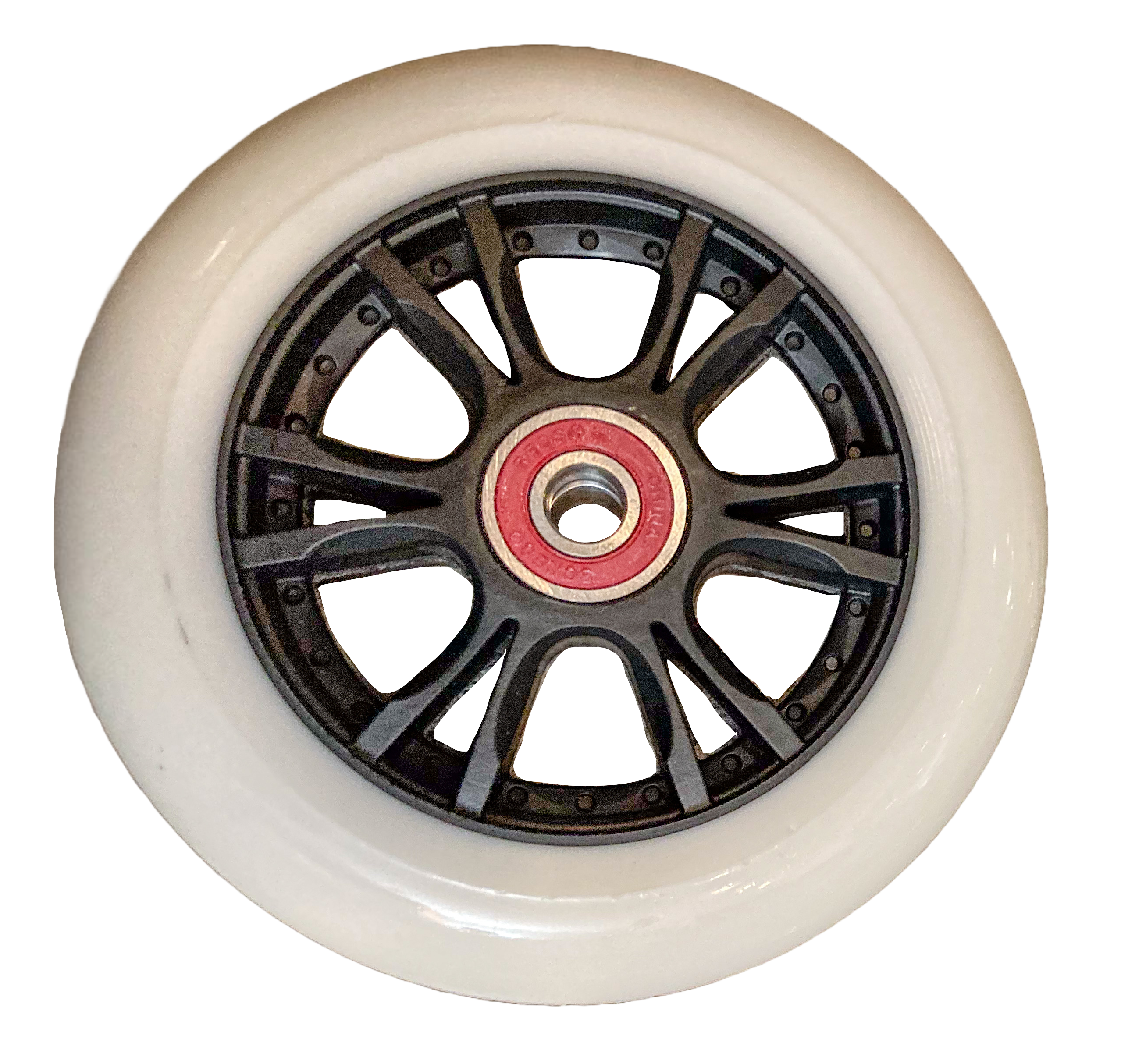
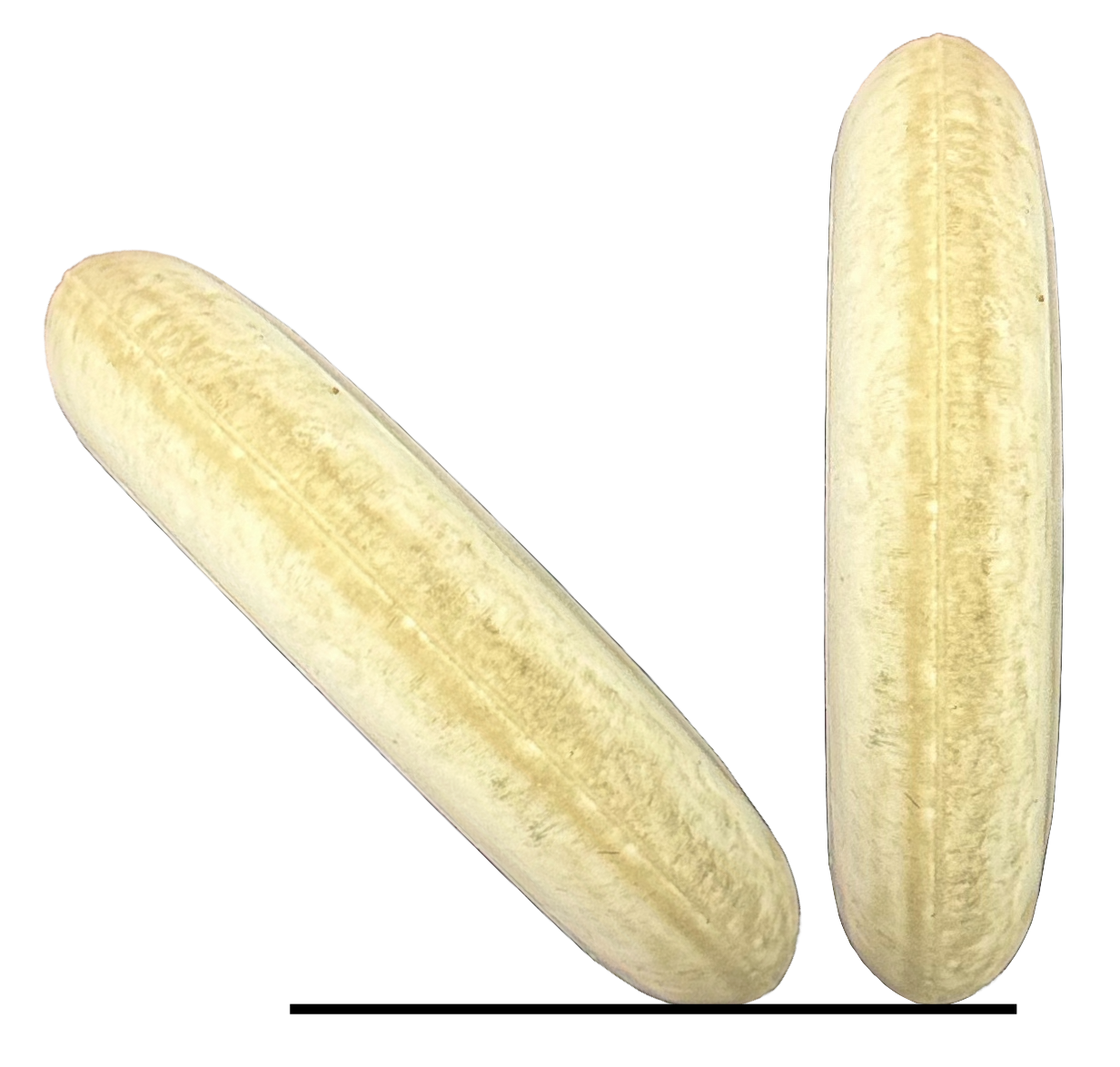
Bullet profile (110 mm) & striding/gliding

At the opposite end of the spectrum from the flat profile is the "bullet" profile, also known as the pointy, thin, narrow, or elliptical profile. It is common in "large" wheels from 90 to 125 mm and often found in speed skates. It helps skaters achieve two seemingly conflicting goals. The first goal is to maximize grip (or static friction) during deep edging, allowing skaters to convert lateral push-offs into forward motion over a longer stride. The second goal is to minimize rolling friction (or rolling resistance) when upright, enabling longer, faster glides with less energy loss.

"Large" wheels act like flywheels, storing rotational energy that helps skaters reach and maintain high speeds over long distances. Their gyroscopic effect stabilizes direction, reducing energy loss from lateral drift. However, their greater mass makes them slower to accelerate. In contrast, "small" wheels have lower rotational inertia, allowing faster starts and quicker maneuvers. They also lower the center of gravity for better control, but give a bumpier ride and perform poorly over bumps, cracks, sticks, and pebbles.

=== Wheel hardness and deformation ===
Wheels deform under the weight of the skater

Polyurethane wheels deform elastically under a skater's weight, which increases ground contact and improves grip. This contact area, known as the "footprint", differs slightly from an unloaded wheel's profile. The ideal deformation varies by surface. On slippery indoor rinks with polished wood floors, softer wheels are better because they deform more and enhance traction. On rough outdoor asphalt, harder wheels are preferred since the surface already offers enough grip with minimal footprint. Balancing grip is essential. Too little grip causes slipping during strides, wasting energy. Too much grip creates rolling resistance, sapping speed during glides.

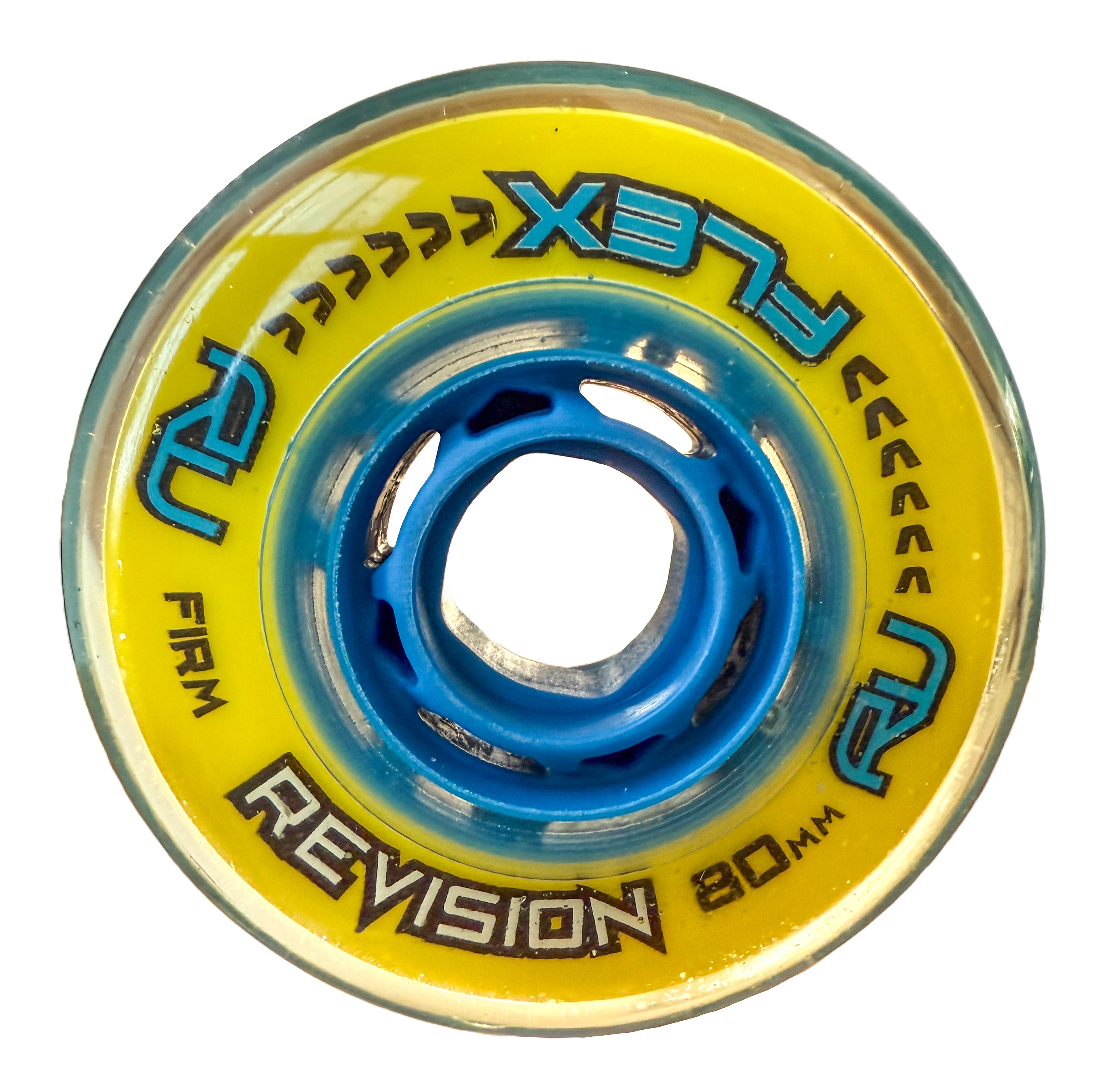
76A indoor

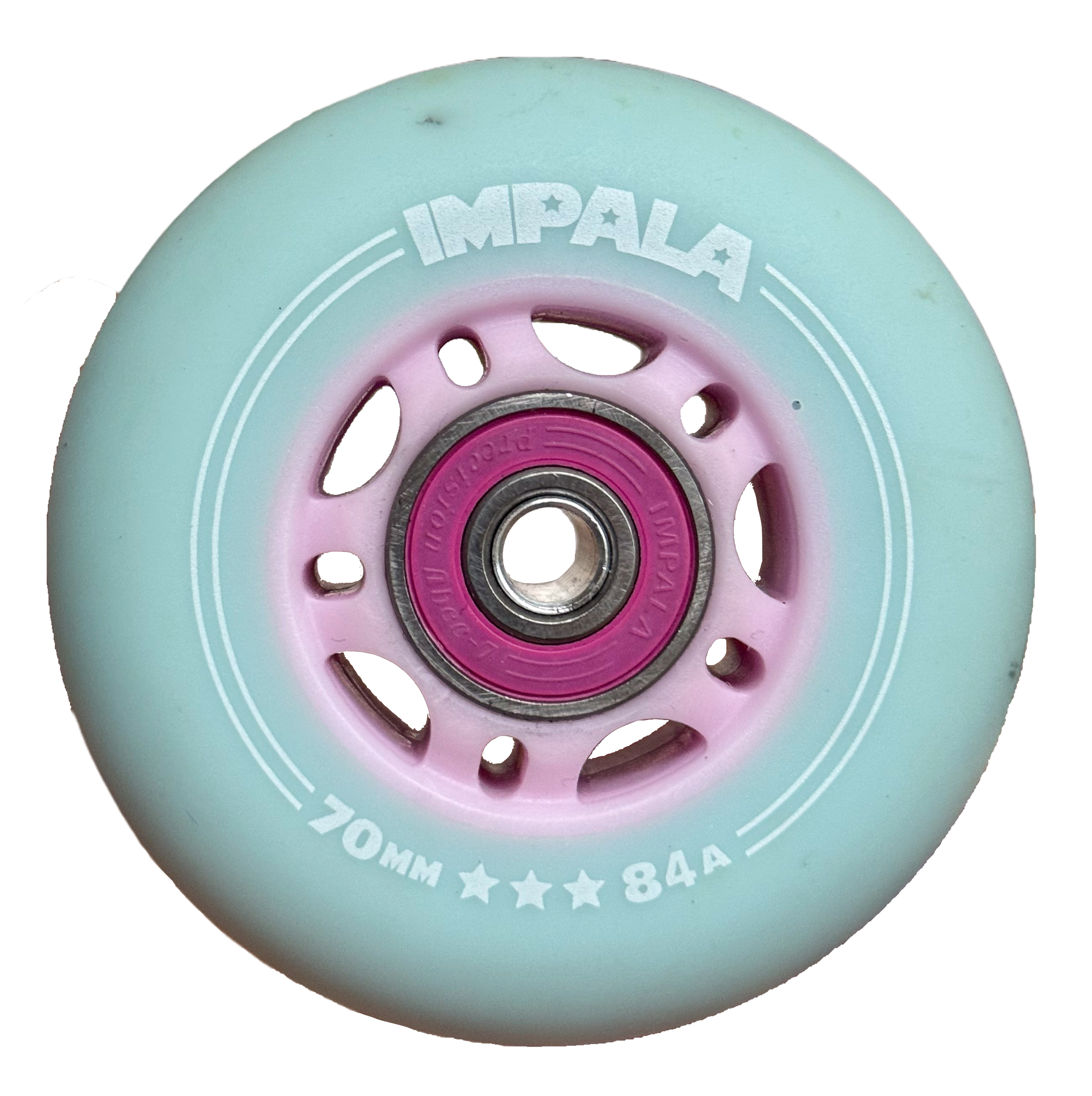
84A outdoor

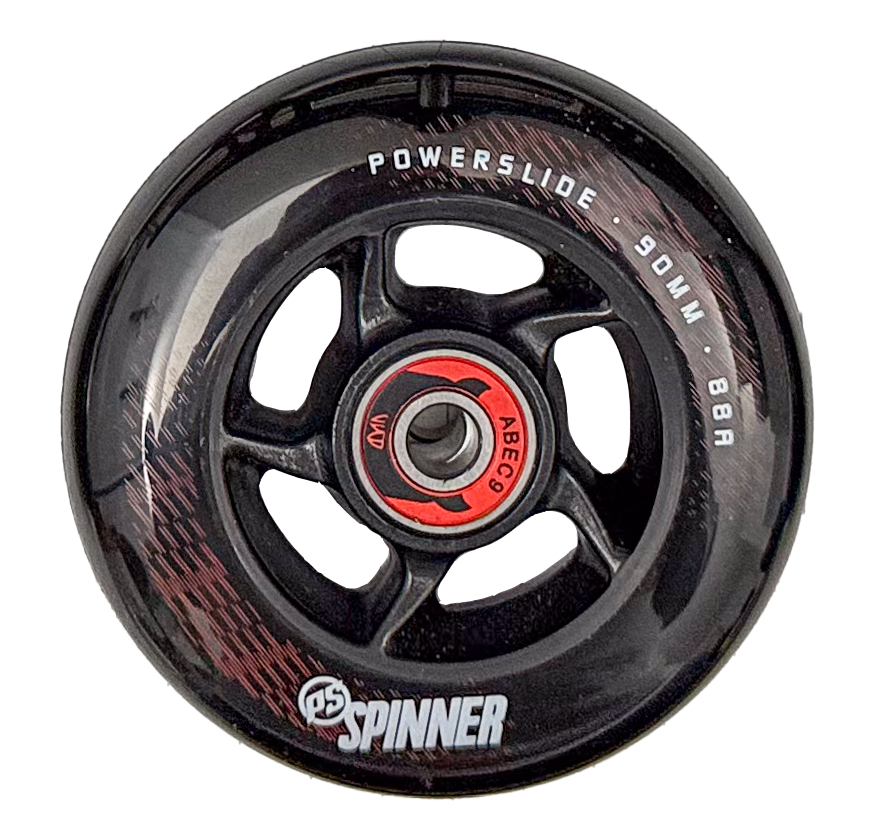
88A urban

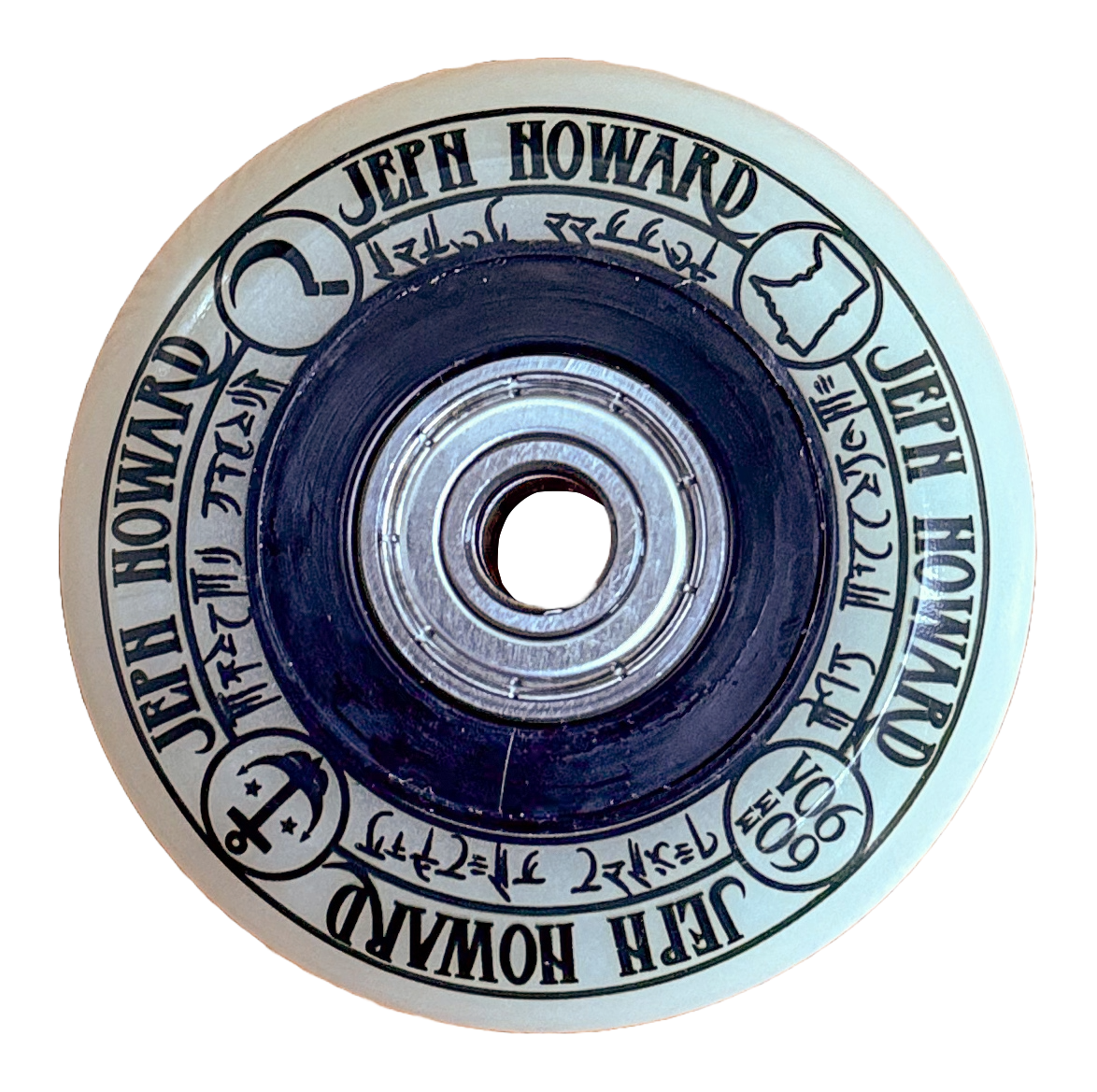
90A aggro

Rolling resistance is generally higher with softer wheels because they deform more, while harder wheels require less effort to start rolling and maintain speed on smooth surfaces. However, "on rough terrain", hard wheels can increase rolling resistance by wasting energy as they repeatedly lift skater's weight over small bumps, thus offsetting their typical quick acceleration and higher sustained speed. Softer wheels, though slower due to deformation, absorb surface irregularities better and help minimize energy loss in addition to providing a smoother ride.

Wheel deformation depends on the skater's weight, the wheel's hardness, and its temperature. While weight and hardness stay constant, temperature varies with ambient conditions, surface heat, and bearings friction from high-speed skating. As temperature rises, the polyurethane softens, causing the wheel to deform more and reducing its effective hardness.

"Wheel hardness" is measured on the Shore A durometer scale, which ranges from 0A (softest) to 100A (hardest). Inline skate wheels usually range from 72A to 95A. Indoor hockey wheels are softest at 72A to 78A. Recreational outdoor wheels are slightly harder, between 80A and 84A. Freestyle slalom and urban wheels range from 83A to 88A, while aggressive wheels are hardest at 88A to 95A.

Within the appropriate "hardness range" for an activity, softer wheels offer better grip for quicker acceleration during lateral strides, and a smoother ride on uneven surfaces, though they wear out faster. Harder wheels allow for higher gliding speeds, resist wear on rough surfaces, and offer a more responsive feel, but they can lead to a bumpier ride and some energy loss.

=== Dual density wheels ===
Dual density wheels were developed to address the long-standing challenge of choosing a single wheel hardness to meet opposing needs. Softer wheels provided shock absorption over rough terrain and better grip at deep edging angles, while harder wheels offered greater wear resistance and higher speeds on smooth, upright glides. Skaters had to compromise, as no single hardness met both demands effectively.

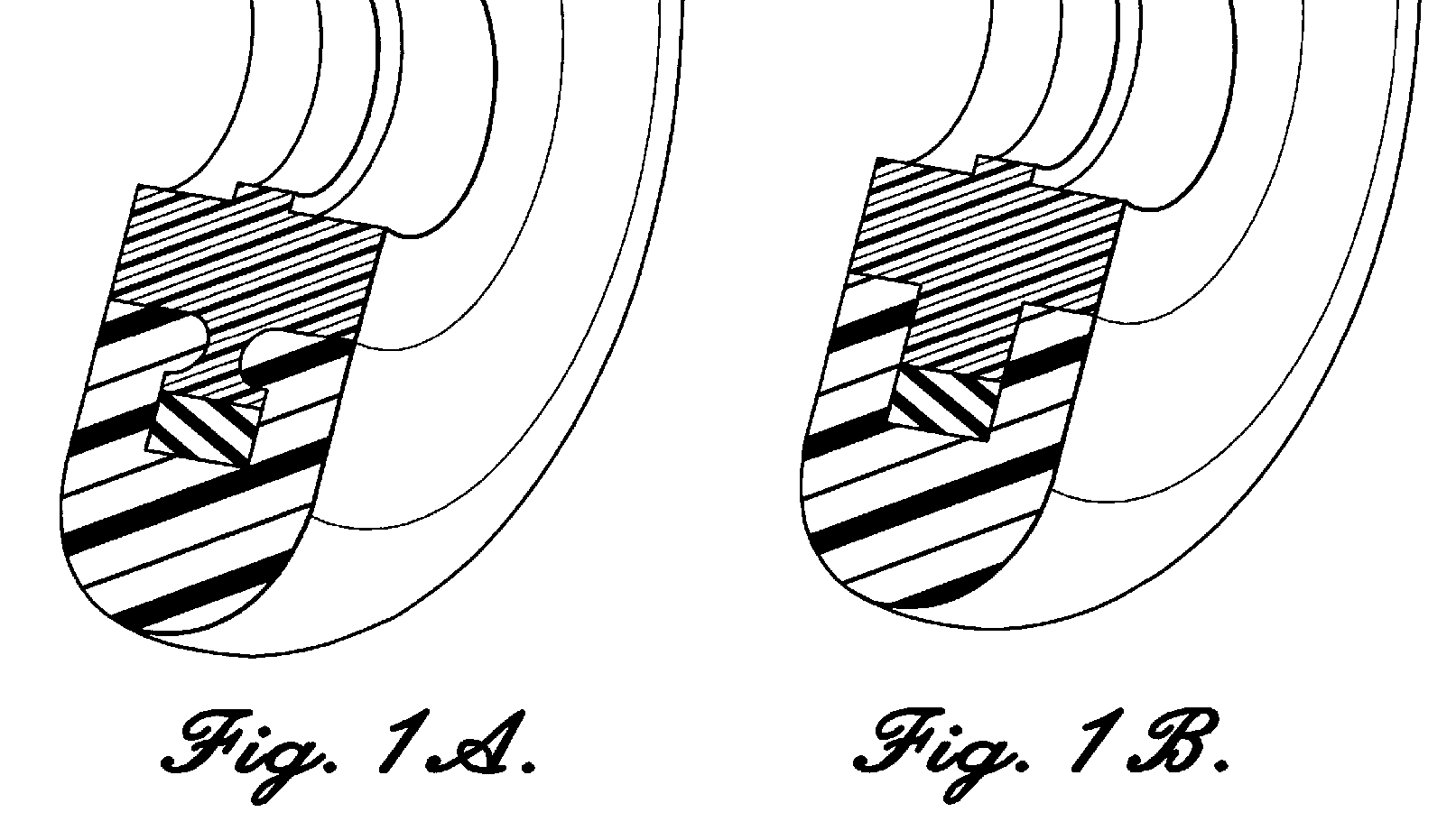
Dual durometer wheel

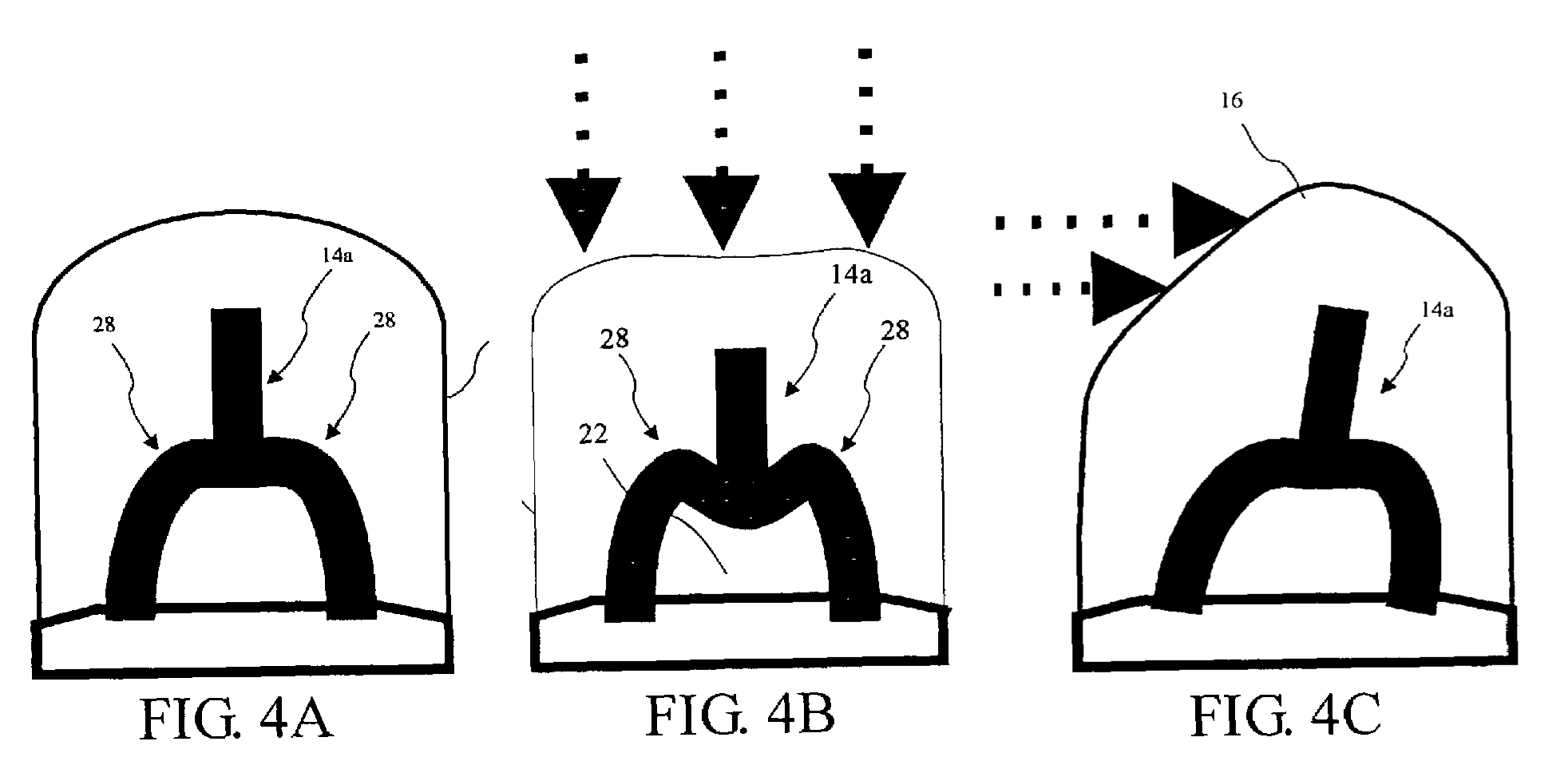
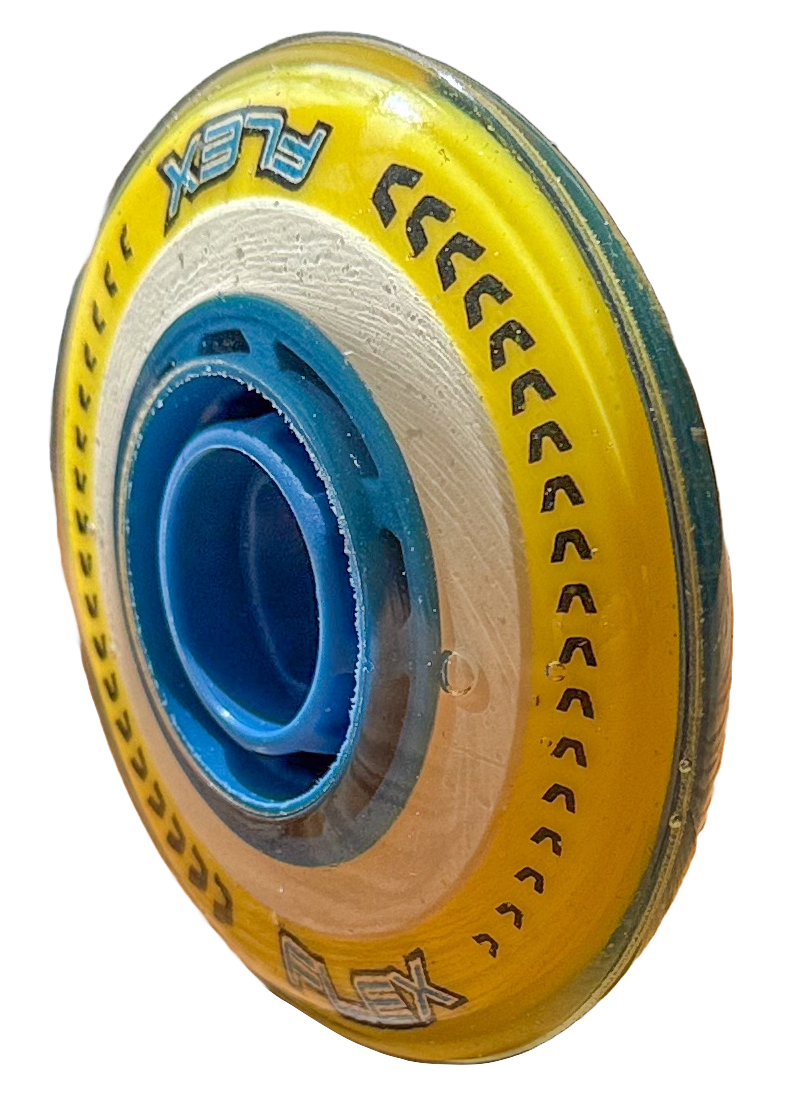
Soft tire molded over harder support

In 1997, K2 patented a "dual durometer" wheel, later known as a "dual density" wheel, aimed at combining a smooth ride over rough terrain with the durability and speed of hard wheels. Unlike single-compound wheels, it used two polyurethane layers: a hard outer tire (70A to 100A) for wear resistance and speed, and a soft inner ring (20A to 75A) to absorb shocks and vibrations.

In 1997, Neal Piper and Tom Peterson of Hyper Wheels patented a similar dual-layer wheel concept, but used a triangular foam mandrel instead of a soft polyurethane ring. This design aimed to match the benefits of K2's dual-durometer wheels, while also improving grip during deep edging. The foam mandrel's shape prevented deformation at the wheel's tip during upright skating, while allowing the sides to flex under angled loads, enhancing grip during strides and turns at about a 30° tilt.

In 2004, Neal Piper patented a multi-density wheel that reversed his 1997 design by using a soft outer polyurethane layer (60A to 75A) over a much harder internal support structure (80A to 95A or more). First seen in Variant hockey wheels from Revision, and later in the Recoil and Flex lines, this design gave hockey players top speed without sacrificing high grip.

=== Wheel rebound ===
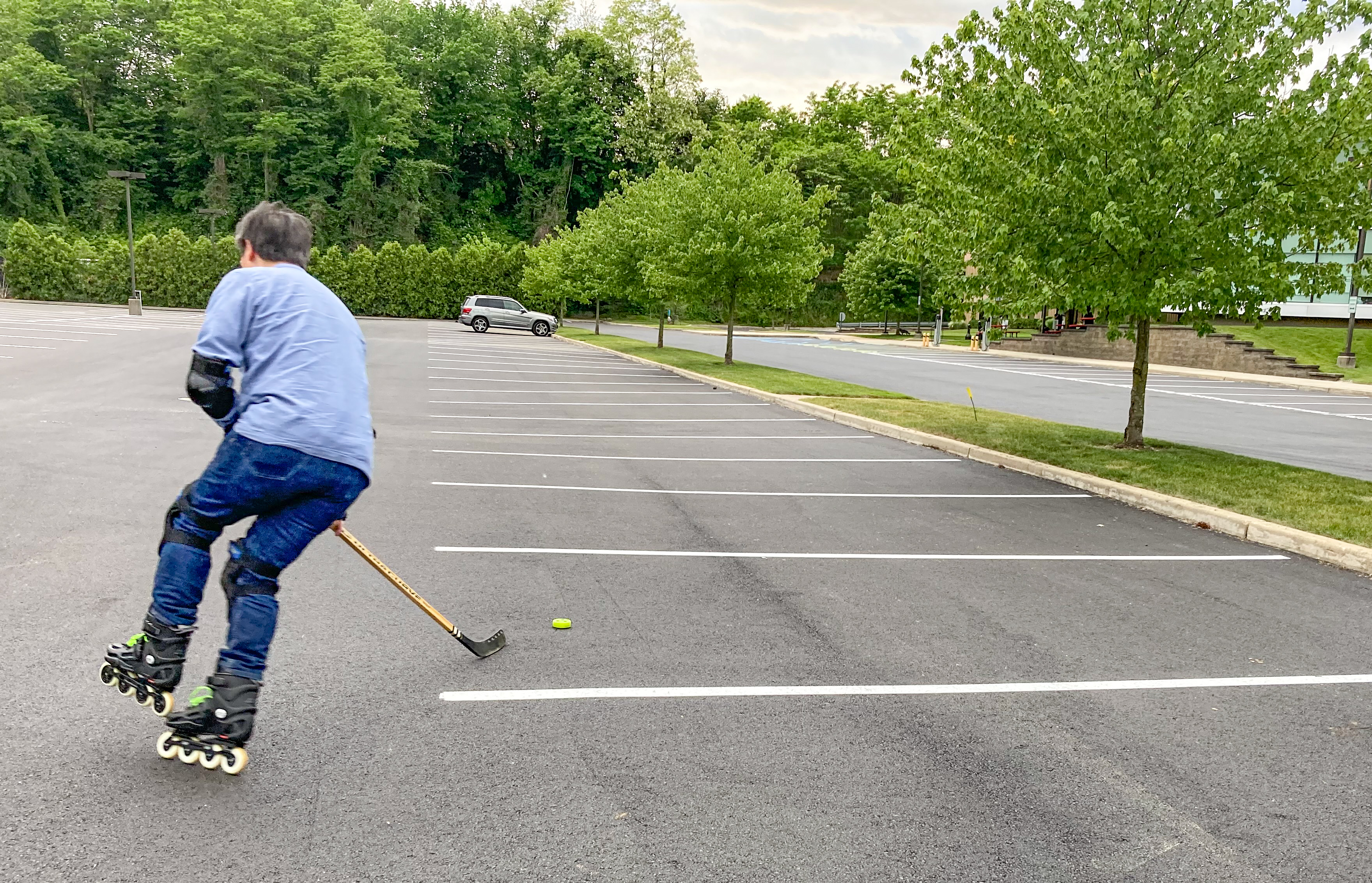
Rebound improves cornering

Wheel rebound is the energy a polyurethane wheel returns as it recovers its shape after being elastically deformed. Though widely discussed, there is no consensus on how to rate it. Unlike other wheel traits that depend on skating style or terrain, rebound is universally desired. Higher rebound is always preferred, if cost were not a factor.

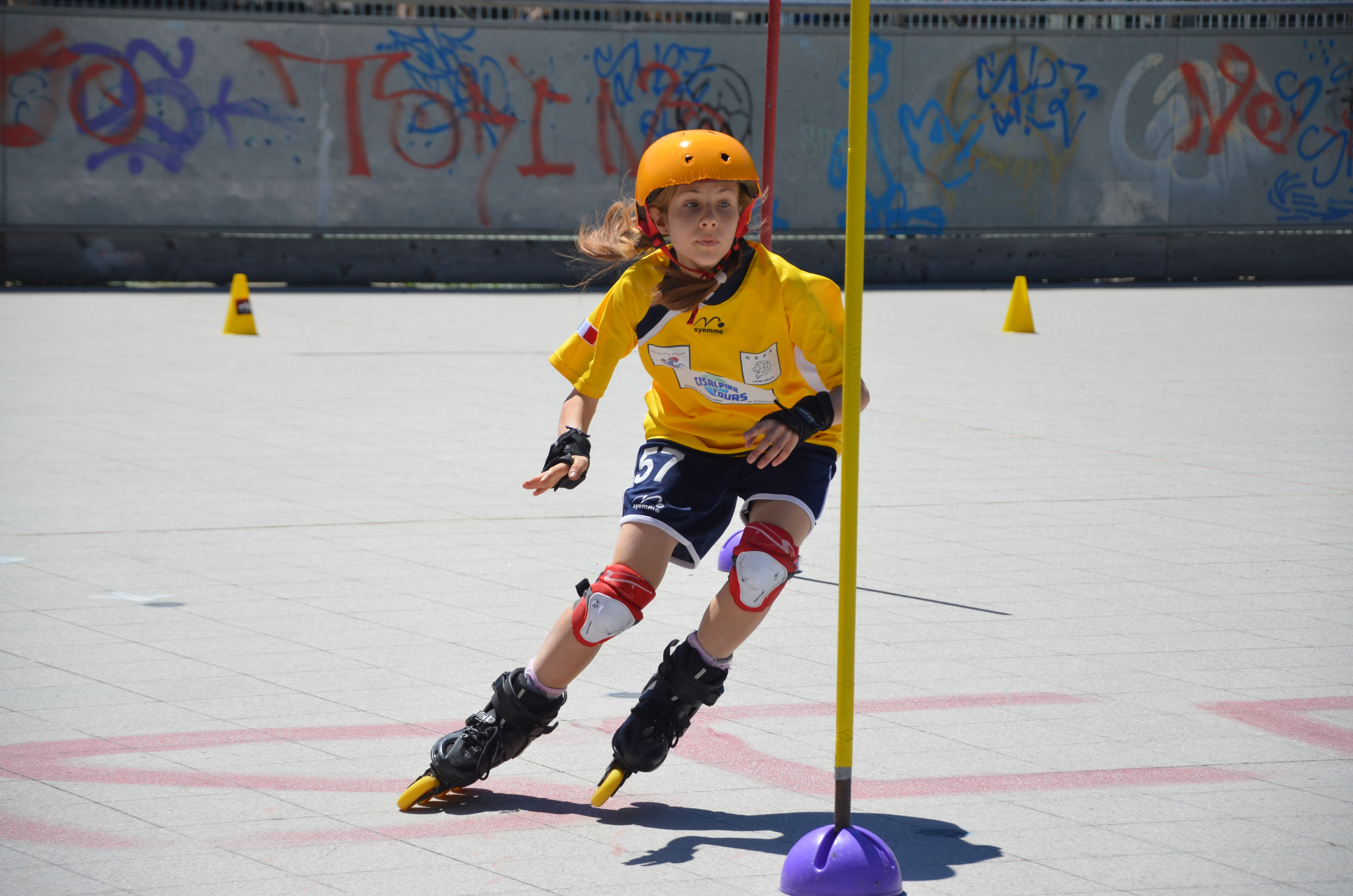
High rebound wheels feel lively and responsive

"High-rebound" wheels feel lively and responsive, helping skaters roll faster with less effort by converting more energy from each push into forward motion. "Low-rebound" wheels feel dead, absorbing energy like flat tires and requiring more effort to maintain speed, similar to walking on soft sand.

A polyurethane compound can be formulated with varying rebound levels regardless of hardness. "Hardness" affects how much a wheel compresses under load, while "rebound" measures how much of that energy is converted to aid forward motion. These are separate, distinct properties.

Rebound can be measured using tests like the Bayshore Resilience test, which compares rebound height to drop height, and the Rebound Resilience test, which measures percentage of energy return. These tests assess "polyurethane resilience", another term for rebound, but their quantification of elasticity are not directly comparable. Inline skate wheels rarely list rebound in technical datasheets, and when they do, it's usually under vague labels like High Rebound (HR) or Ultra High Rebound (UHR).

In mechanics, rebound is closely linked to elastic hysteresis, its complementary property, which measures energy lost as heat during deformation and recovery. The two are inversely proportional: higher hysteresis means more energy loss and lower rebound.

=== Rolling resistance ===
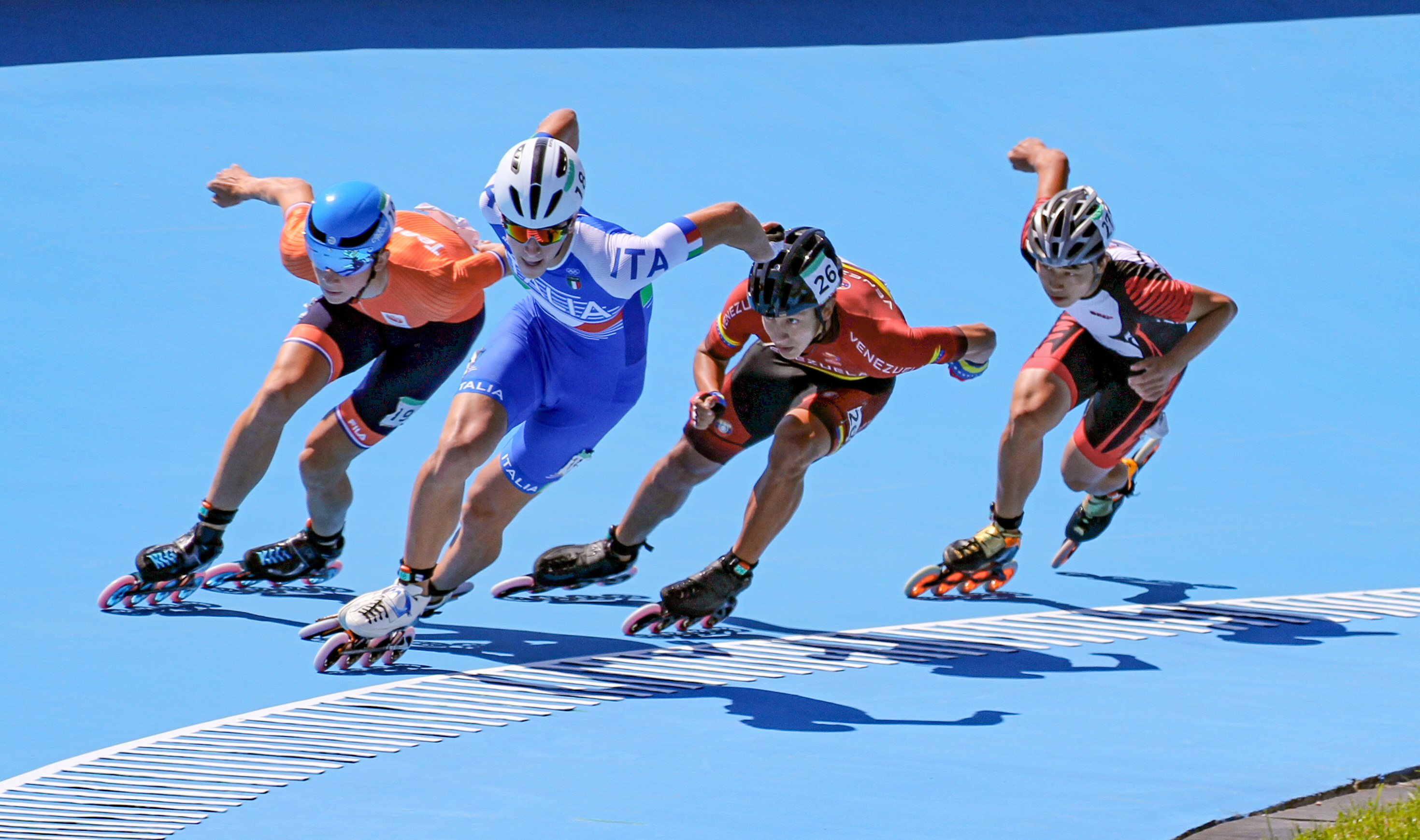
Minimizing rolling resistance

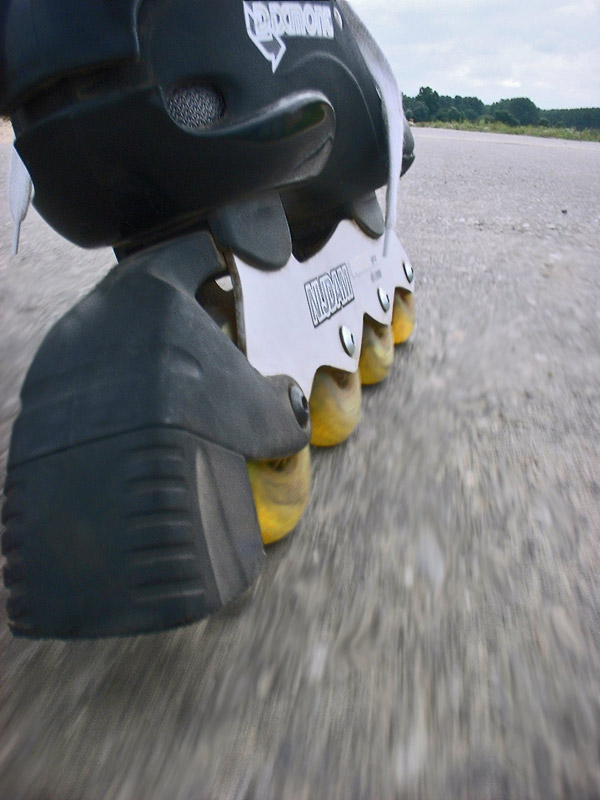
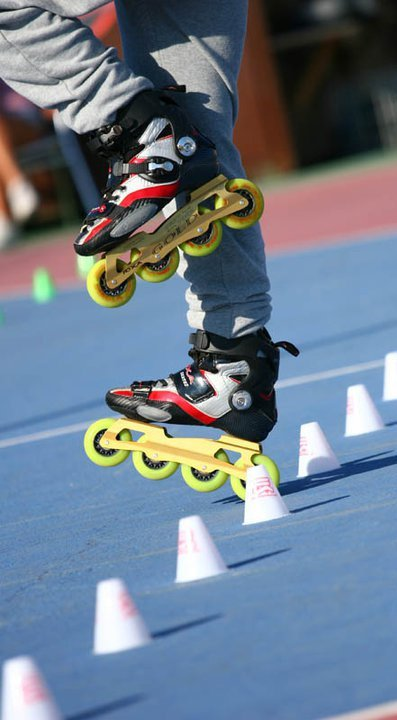
Surfaces: rough vs. smooth

Rolling resistance (also rolling friction or drag) is a key factor limiting a skater's top speed. It opposes wheel motion and is mainly caused by elastic hysteresis. To reduce it, manufacturers design polyurethane compounds for high rebound and thus low hysteresis, which is especially important in speed skating.

Skater weight and wheel hardness affect wheel deformation and footprint size, which influences rolling resistance. Speed skaters prefer hard, pointy-profile wheels to keep footprints small and reduce resistance, while gliding upright. Dual-density wheels were developed to minimize footprint while preserving comfort.

Terrain roughness also affects rolling resistance, as energy is wasted repeatedly lifting the skater over small surface imperfection. The need to cushion bumpy rides without increasing the footprint was another driving force behind dual-density wheels.

Wheel diameter plays another key role in rolling resistance, especially on rough terrain. Larger wheels reduce resistance by smoothing out surface imperfections and lowering the angle of contact with small bumps. This reduces energy loss. As a result, wheels between 90 mm and 125 mm are common in urban and marathon skates, where both speed and handling uneven surfaces are important.

== Bearings ==
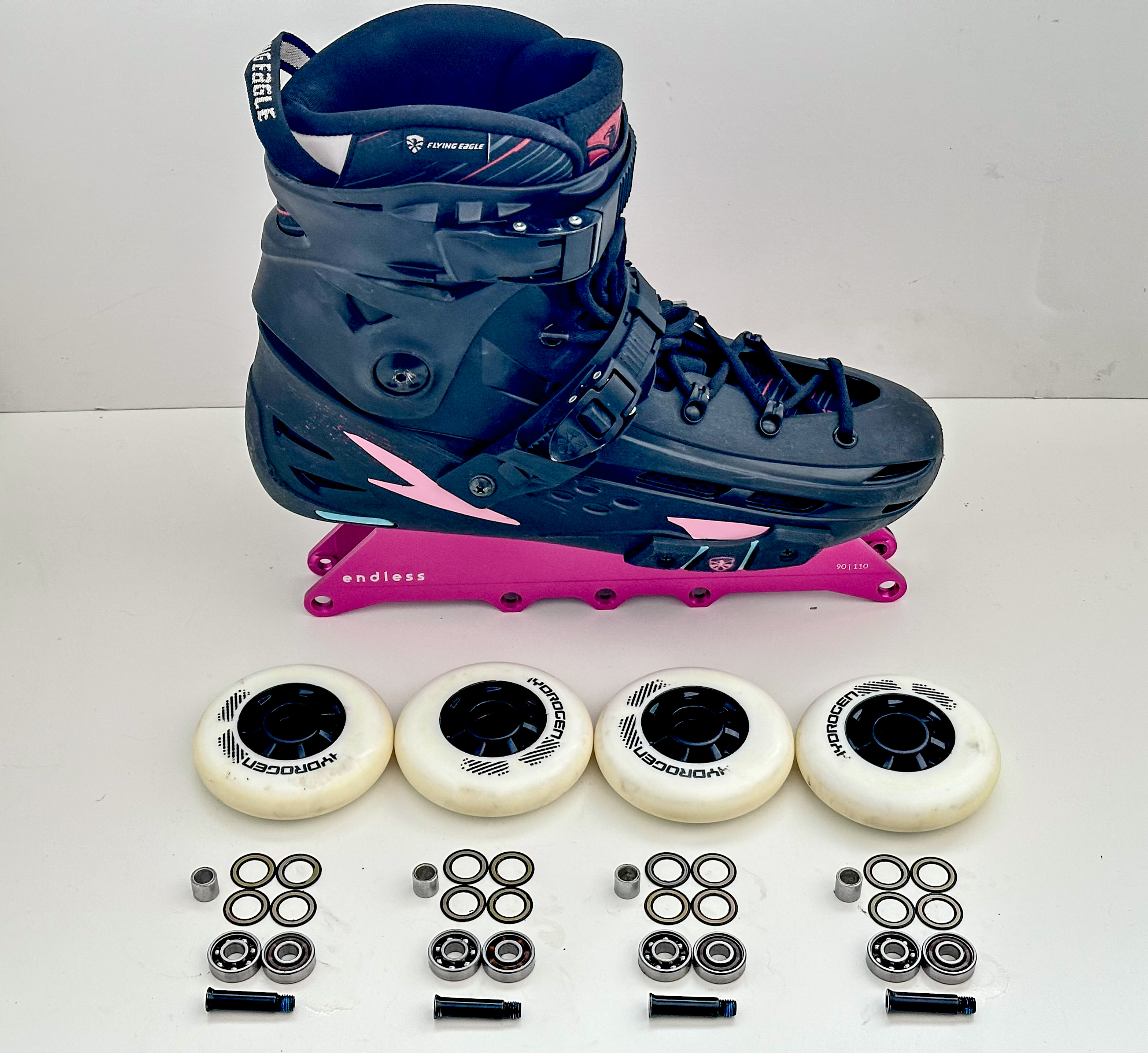
Bearings used in inline skates

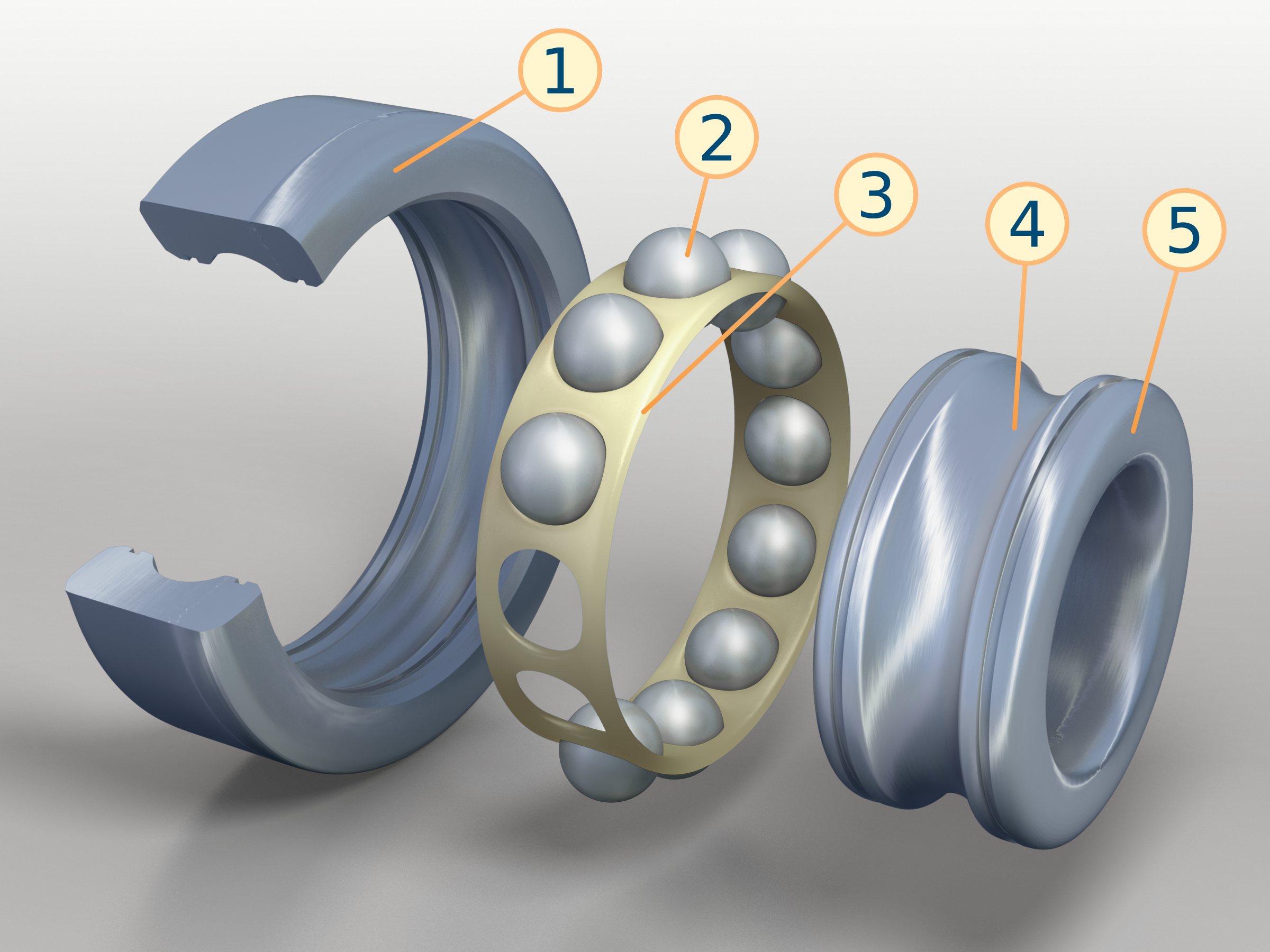
Grooves & balls

Ball bearings allow inline skate wheels to spin freely by separating the moving wheels from the non-moving structure. Wheels rotate around axles that are tightly bolted to the frame, which is securely attached to the boot using fasteners. Bearings minimize friction between the wheel and axle, enabling greater speed with less effort. (Note: Consult sections on bearings, spacers, wheel assembly, and bearing preloading from the Big Wheel article.) The adoption of modern ISO 608 ball bearings, combined with polyurethane wheels, helped propel inline skating to its peak popularity in the 1990s.

An ISO 608 ball bearing has two concentric rings: an outer race attached to the rotating wheel hub and an inner race fixed to the stationary axle. Between them are 5 to 8 rolling balls. Deep grooves in the races form raceways that hold the balls securely. A retainer, or cage, keeps the balls evenly spaced along the raceways.

=== Purpose-built bearings ===
The ABEC scale rates bearing precision from 1 to 9 (highest) in odd numbers, originally for high-speed industrial machinery. Higher ABEC ratings show better precision (or tolerance) but are only one of many factors in a bearing's suitability for inline skating. For inline skating, any ABEC-rated bearing is sufficient, considering that an average skater cruising on 80 mm wheels reaches only about 1,326 RPM. This is just 3.5% of the mechanical limiting speed (38,000 RPM) of ABEC 3-rated 608 bearings from SKF. (Note: SKF’s 1,152-page rolling bearings catalog lists a limiting speed of 38,000 RPM for its Explorer-class 608-2Z bearings (pages 135 and 262). These bearings meet ISO 492 Class 6 precision tolerances, which are equivalent to ABEC 3, as noted on pages 7, 36, 248, and 250.)

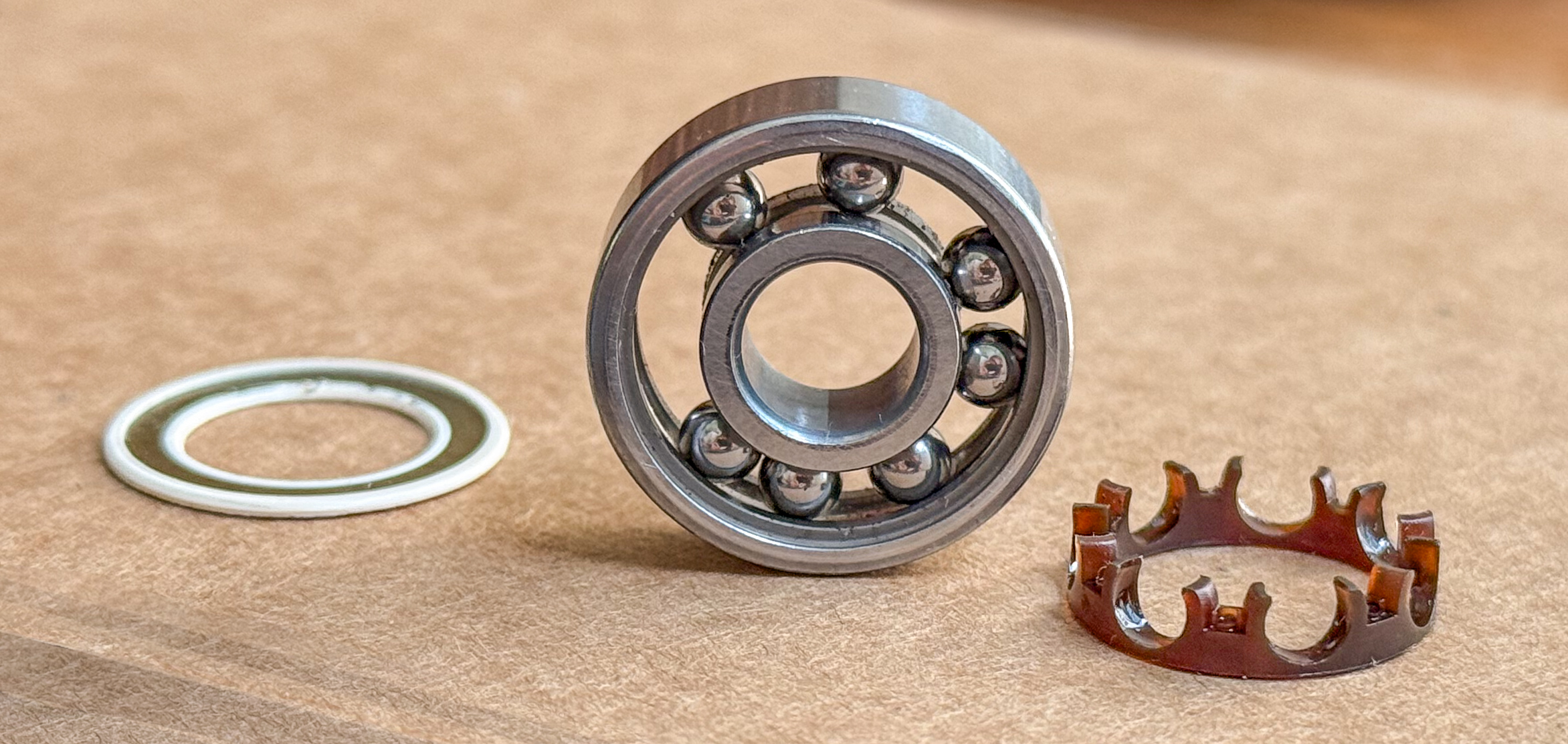
Bones Swiss

However, ABEC does not account for material type, quality, durability, or how bearings handle dirt, moisture, and other factors crucial for skating performance. Recognizing the unique demands of skating, George Powell worked with a Swiss manufacturer to develop 608 bearings specifically for skateboarding, launching Bones Swiss in 1983. Unlike standard bearings made for electric motors operating in clean environments, Bones Swiss bearings were purpose-built and designed to withstand multi-directional abuses from street skating. They featured a serviceable outer shield for easy access when cleaning. The inner side was left open, and molded plastic retainers could be temporarily removed when accessing and cleaning the balls and raceways. Powell also created a custom lubricant suited to skating conditions.

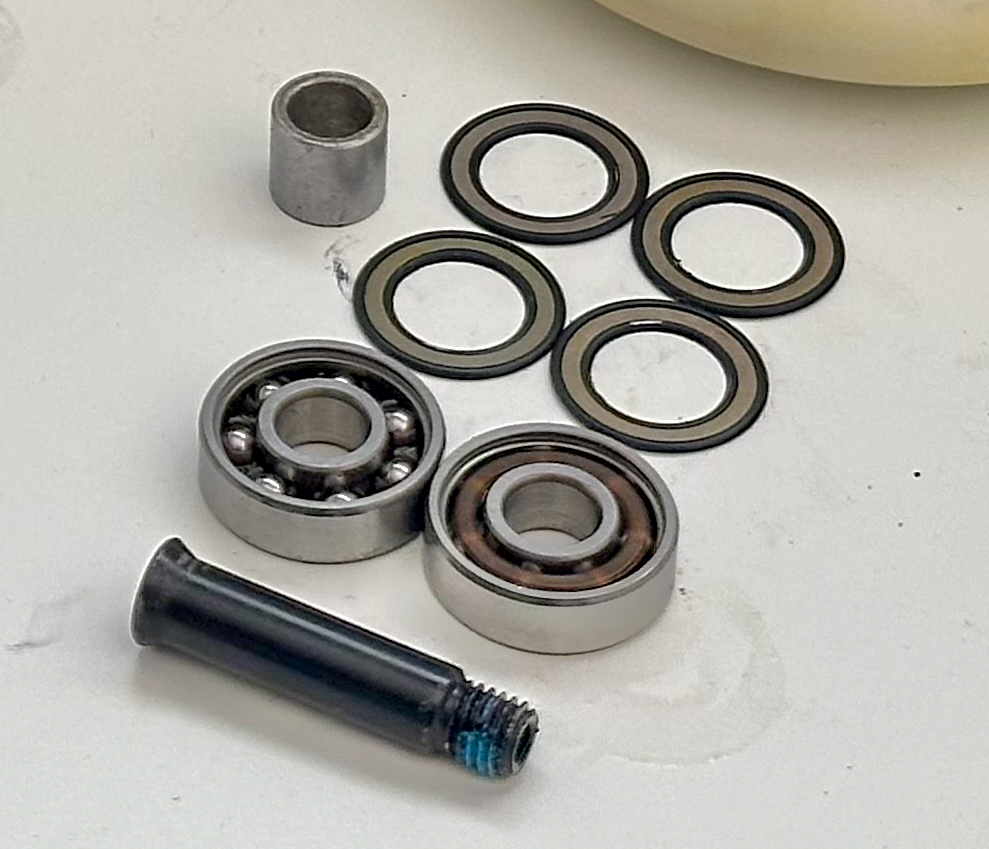
Inline Warehouse

Reputable skate bearing brands typically avoid ABEC ratings, as they don't reflect design features specific to skating. Instead, bearings are marketed under specialized product lines. Bones Bearings, for instance, offers Bones Swiss, Bones Swiss Ceramic, Bones REDS®, and Bones Big Balls®, all labeled Skate Rated™ to show they are engineered for real skating demands. Powell's “Swiss” design and engineering has become an industry benchmark in both skateboarding and inline skating, though some imitation brands sell “Swiss” bearings that mimic the structure and claims without being made in Switzerland.

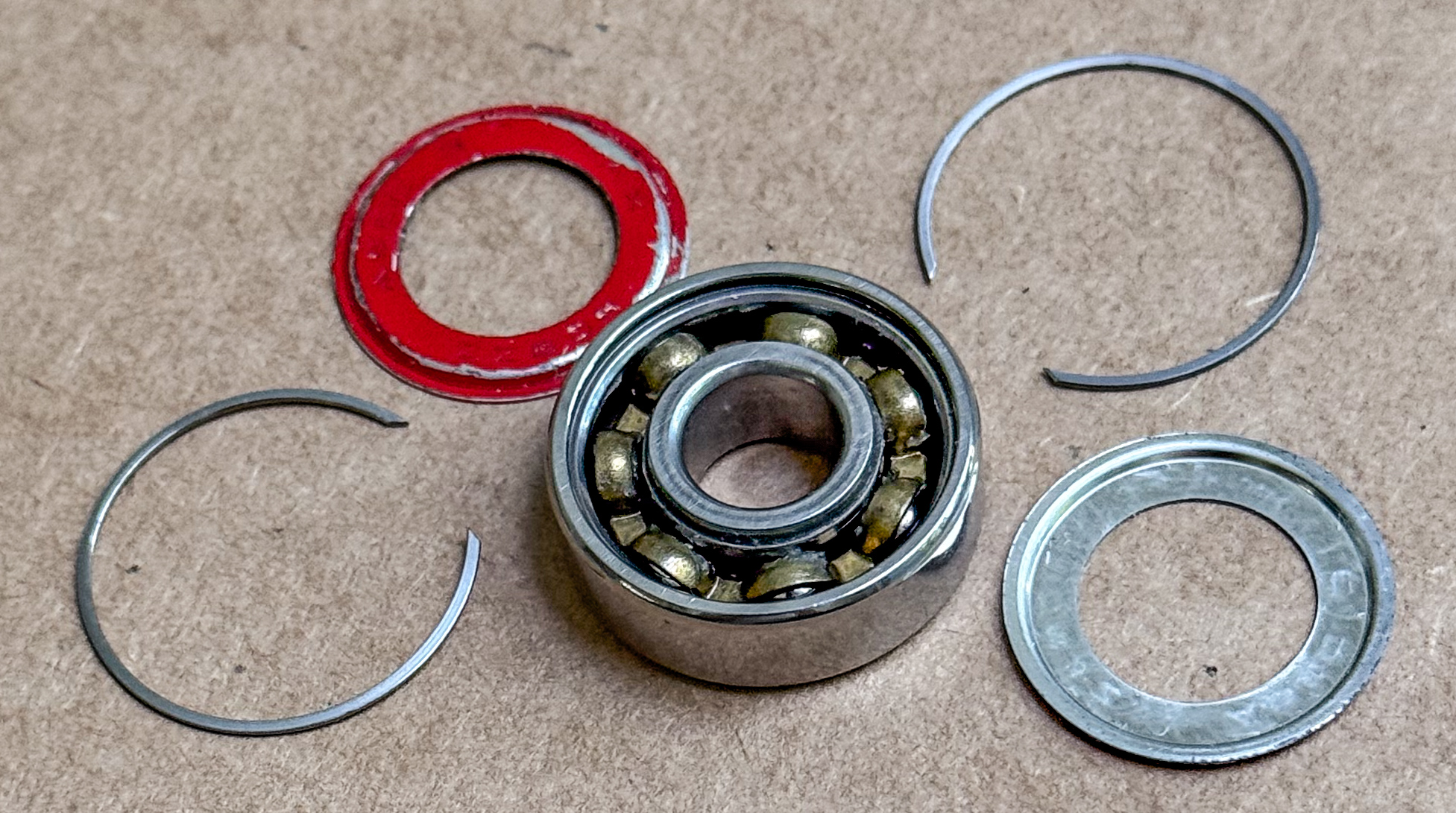
OEM TWINCAM ILQ-7

Similarly, TWINCAM bearings were created in the early 1990s specifically for inline skating, marketed with the slogan “Beyond ABEC”. In 1991, they introduced serviceable bearings with removable shields held in place with a C-clip, followed in 1992 by TK CLASSIC Racing Gel, a water-repellent lubricant. In 2002, they launched the ILQ-9, a 6-ball bearing, as an alternative to the standard 7-ball setup. The ILQ line later expanded to include models such as ILQ-9 Pro with rubber shields, ILQ-7 for OEM skates, ILQ-X mr2 with reduced weight, and ILQ-Midget with 11 balls. TWINCAM trademarked "ILQ" (InLine Qualified) as a proprietary rating system, and had various ILQ models rebranded and redistributed by partners such as FR Skates, K2, Rollerblade, and Powerslide/Wicked.

=== Contamination and bearing friction ===
Skaters lose energy not only from wheel rolling resistance but also from bearing friction, caused by internal components like balls, cage, lubricant, and seals. However, in clean, well-lubricated bearings, this friction is minimal compared to rolling resistance of polyurethane wheels. Most purpose-built bearings from reputable brands meet or exceed ABEC 3 specs, so bearing selection has little effect on performance when bearings are new.

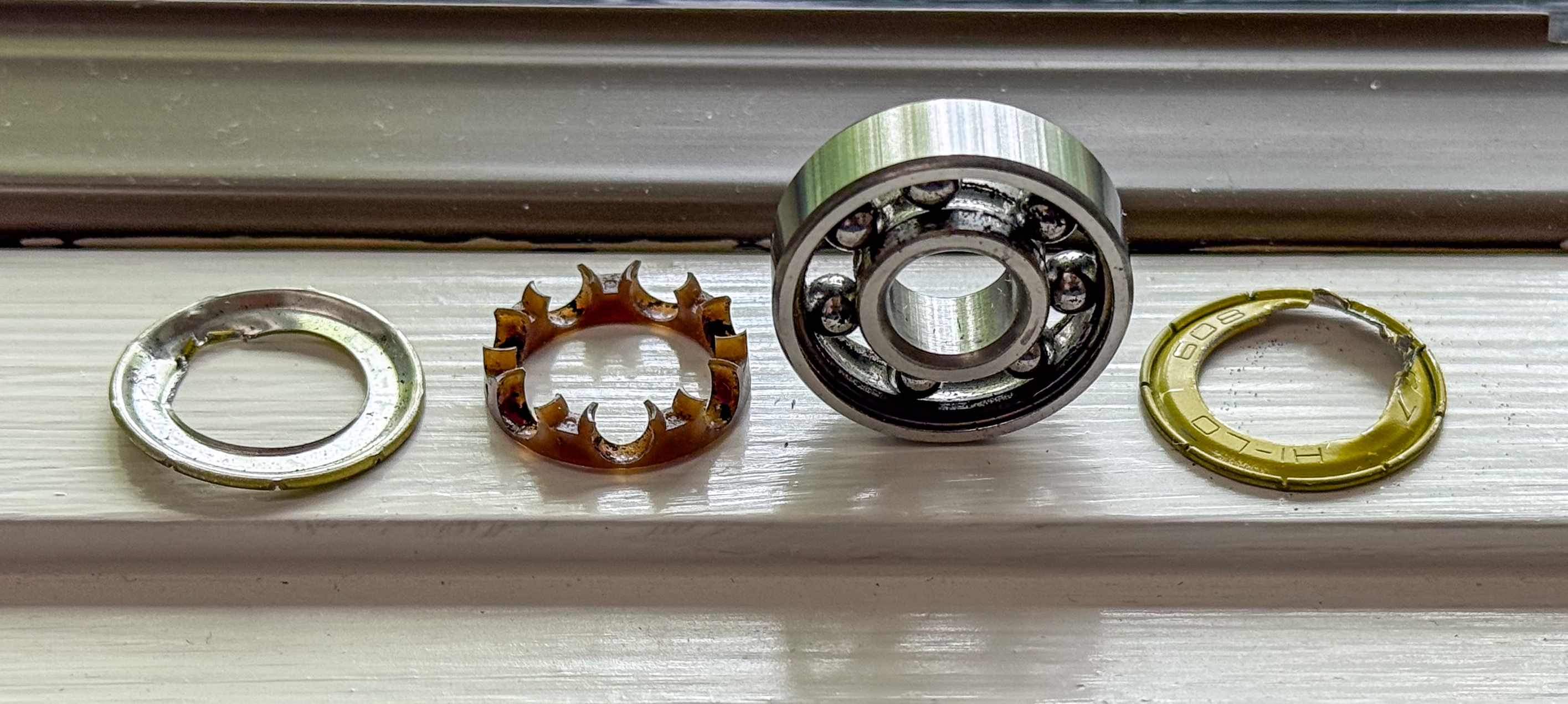
Dirt trapped inside a bearing

Bearing selection plays a significant role over the lifetime of bearings, however, because performance depends on how well bearings resist contamination from dirt, dust, and moisture. Even microscopic particles can damage raceways and hinder smooth rotation. Contamination is the most harmful factor; it reduces efficiency or causes bearings to seize. As skaters say, the fastest bearings in the world are simply ones that are new or freshly cleaned and lubricated.

=== Bearing shields ===
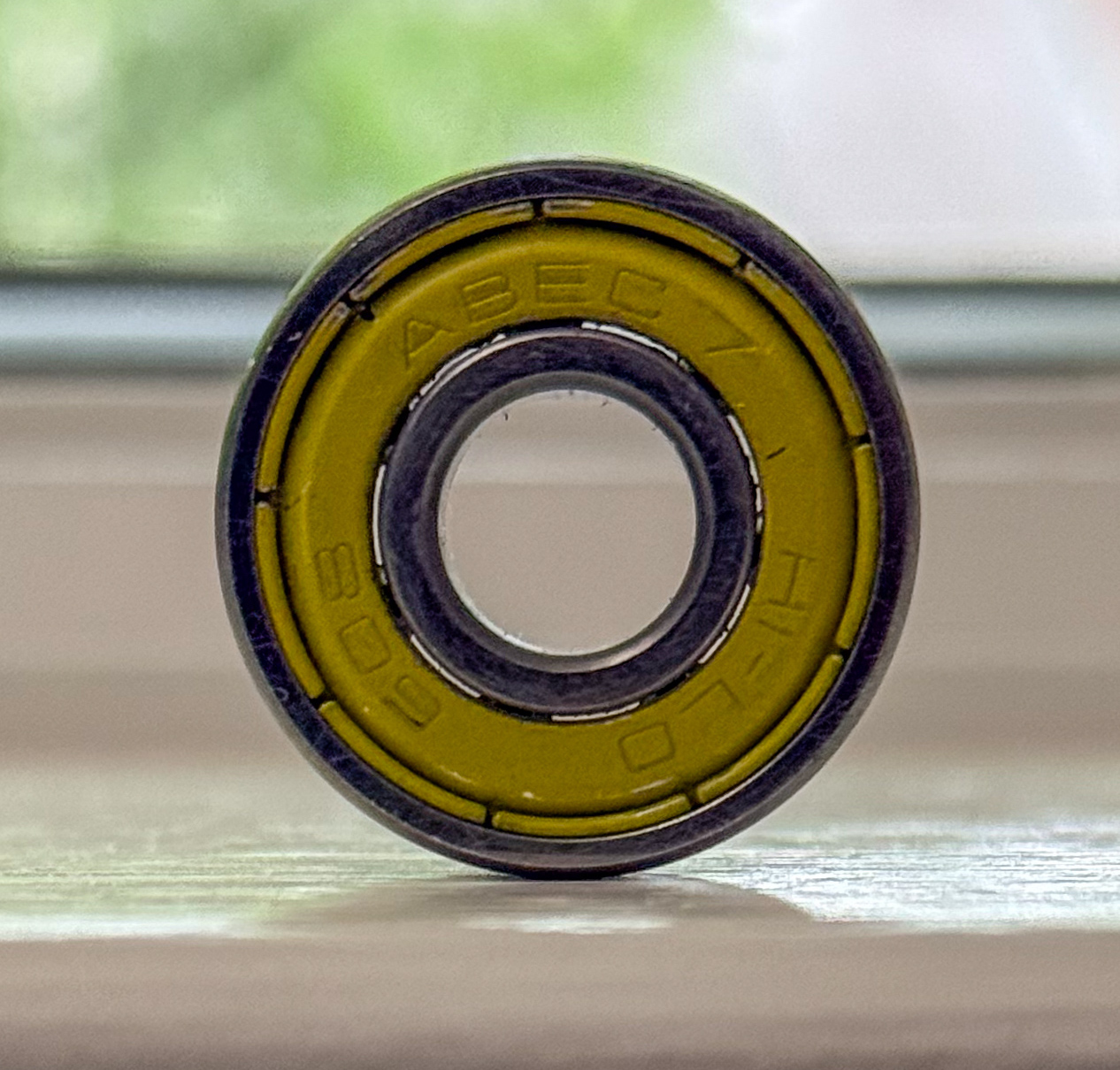
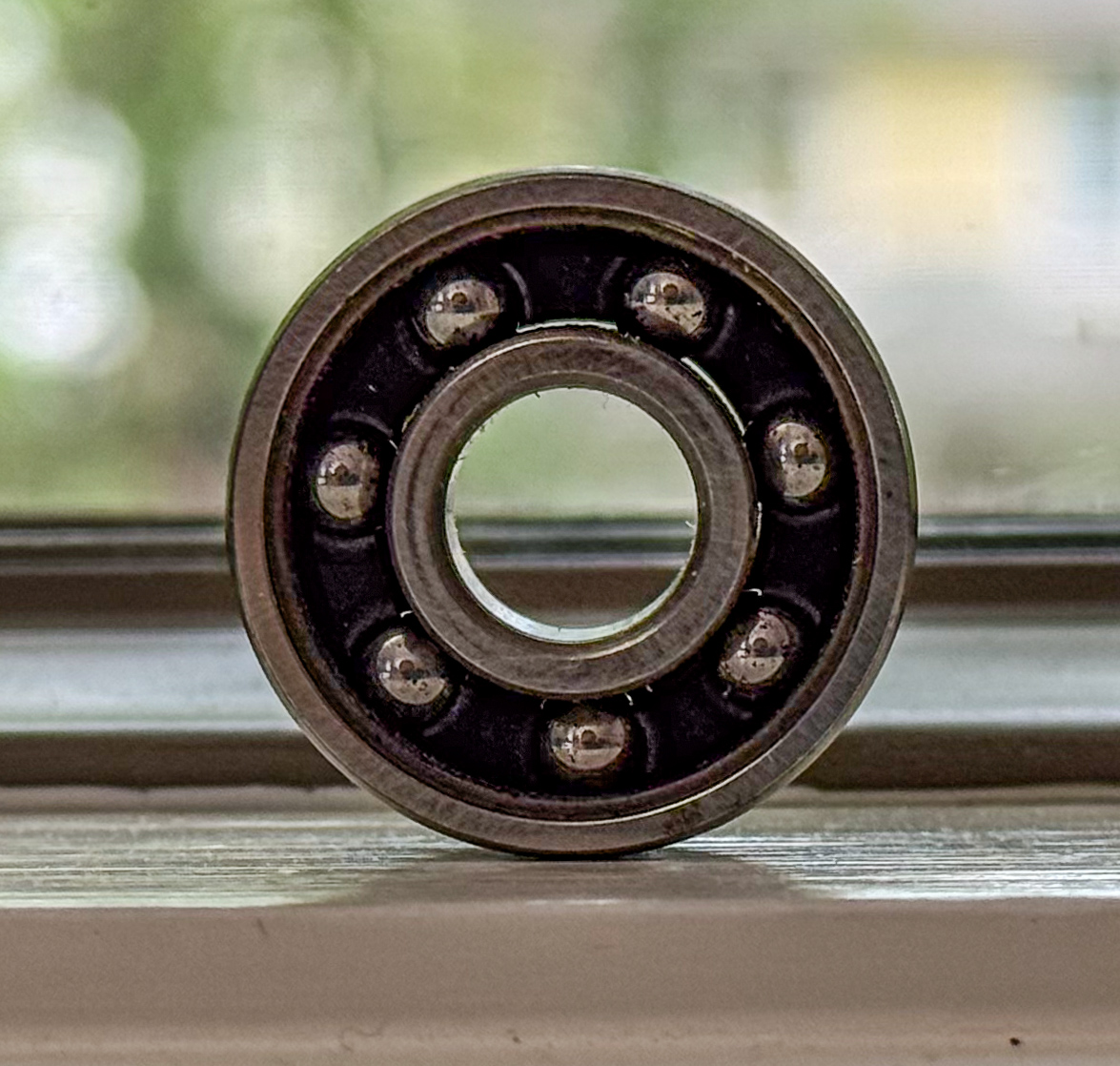
Z shields showing gaps

Inline skate bearings are protected from contamination using four main shield types: (Z) non-serviceable metal gap shields, (ZS) serviceable metal gap shields with a C-ring, (RS) serviceable rubber gap shields bonded to a metal insert, and (RSL) full-contact labyrinth rubber lip seals. (Note: Bearing shielding and sealing are designated by suffixes that vary between manufacturers. These designations are typically published in technical handbooks and catalogs. One NTN suffix conversion table can be found on page 178 of the Bearing Nomenclature Guide by BDS. There is no industry-wide standard that clearly defines when a "shield" becomes a "seal", nor where non-contact shields end and light-contact or non-contact seals begin. Likewise, the skating industry adopts suffixes inspired by those used in the bearing industry, but does not apply them consistently across brands. Generally, removable metal gap shields are labeled with the suffix "Z" in a fairly uniform way. See Rollerblade SG9 bearings (archived). C-ring mounted metal gap shields, popularized by TWINCAM, are rarely marked with a distinct suffix, but when they are, they follow the "ZS" convention used by SKF. The skating industry’s use of the "RS" suffix typically refers to a non-contact NBR shield that physically resembles the RS/2RS contact lip seals used by INA/Schaeffler, but instead leaves a narrow gap, similar to SKF’s non-contact "RZ" shields. The "RSL" suffix in skating refers to a full-contact labyrinth seal, comparable to SKF’s own RSL low-friction seals, except that SKF RSL leaves small gaps while bending the contamination path.)

Z shields: simple metal covers that snap into the outer race without touching the inner race, leaving a small non-contact gap. They create no drag but offer limited protection and cannot be removed without damage. Bearings with shields on both sides are labeled "ZZ" and are non-serviceable (e.g., Rollerblade SG).

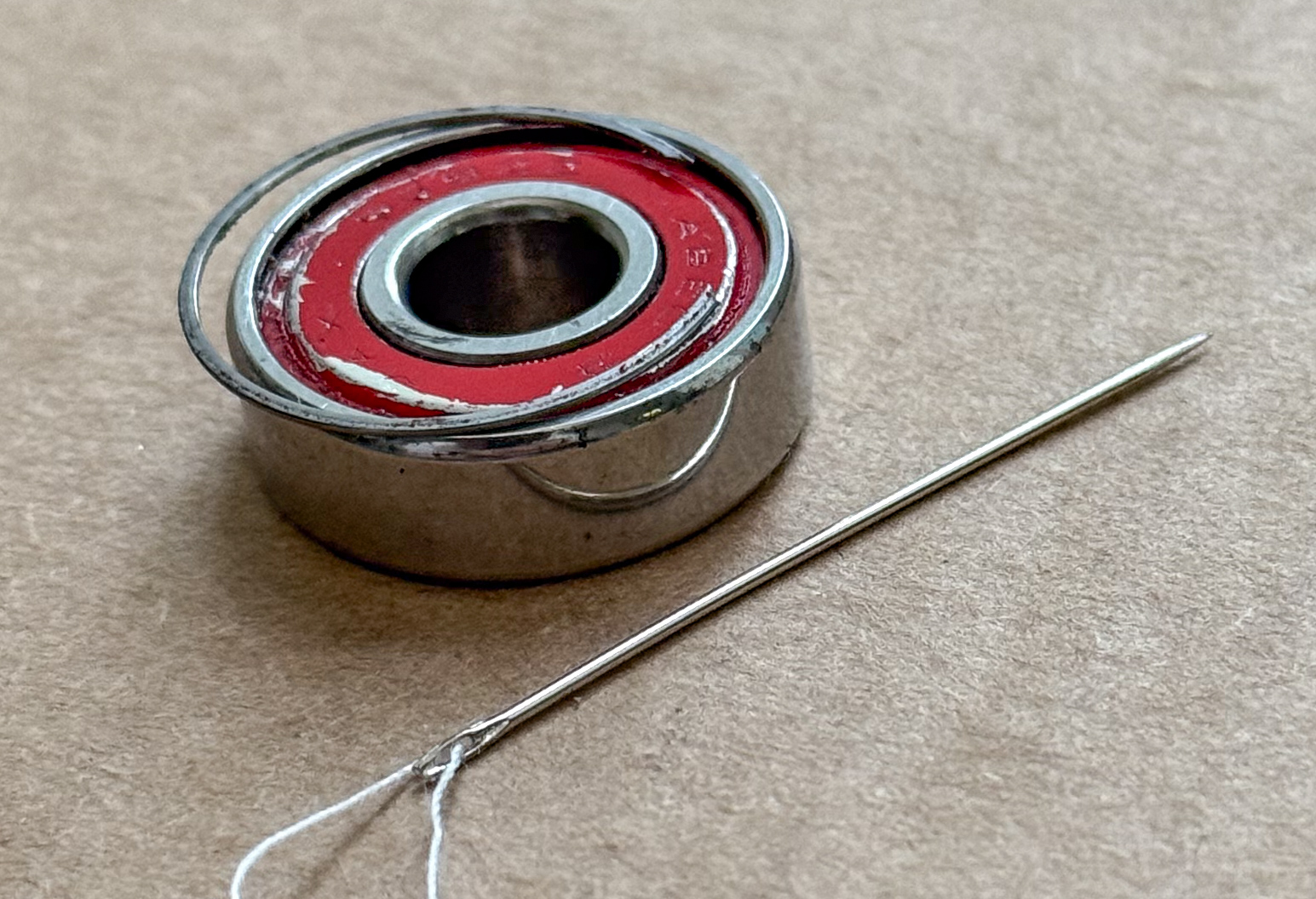
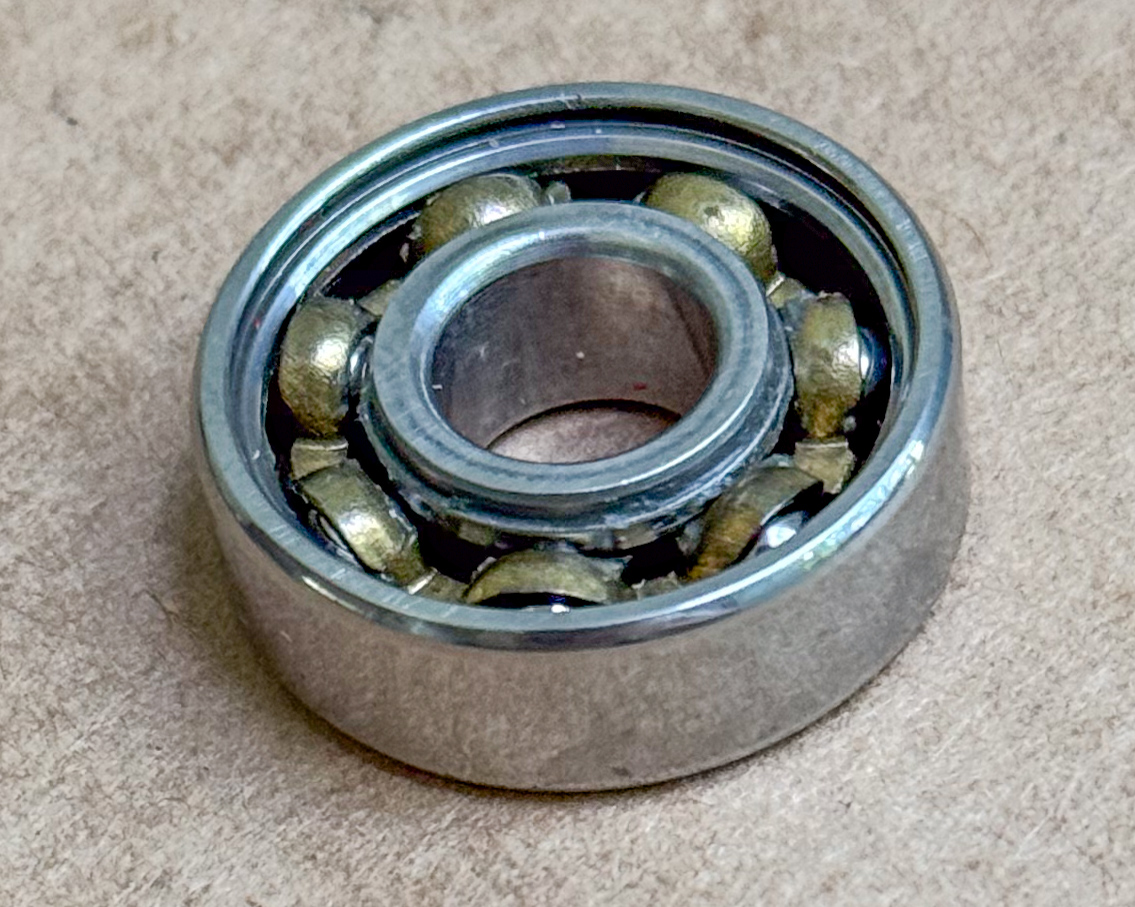
ZS shields released by C-ring

ZS shields: similar to Z shields, but feature a removable C-clip (C-ring), allowing for easy shield removal for maintenance. They are similarly non-contact and low-drag, and similarly provide minimal defense against dirt and moisture. Their main advantage is serviceability: that skaters can remove and reattach the shields without damage, enabling regular cleaning and relubrication. This design is used in TWINCAM ILQ-style bearings, with double-shielded ones often labeled "2ZS" or "ZZS".

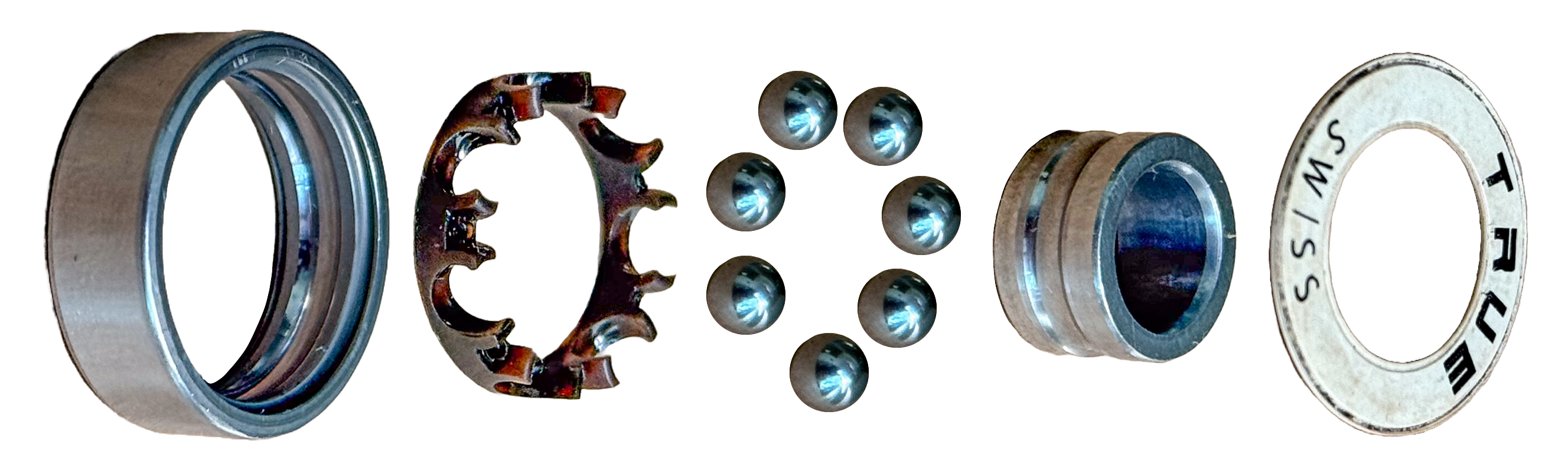
RS shield in Bones Swiss

RS shields: use a nitrile rubber shield bonded to a metal insert. In skating, RS rubber shields specifically refer to the design popularized by Bones Swiss. They offer better protection than Z or ZS shields and are removable for cleaning and maintenance. Many skate brands use only one RS shield, leaving the inner side open and protected by the wheel hub, allowing easy lubrication access without even removing the shield.

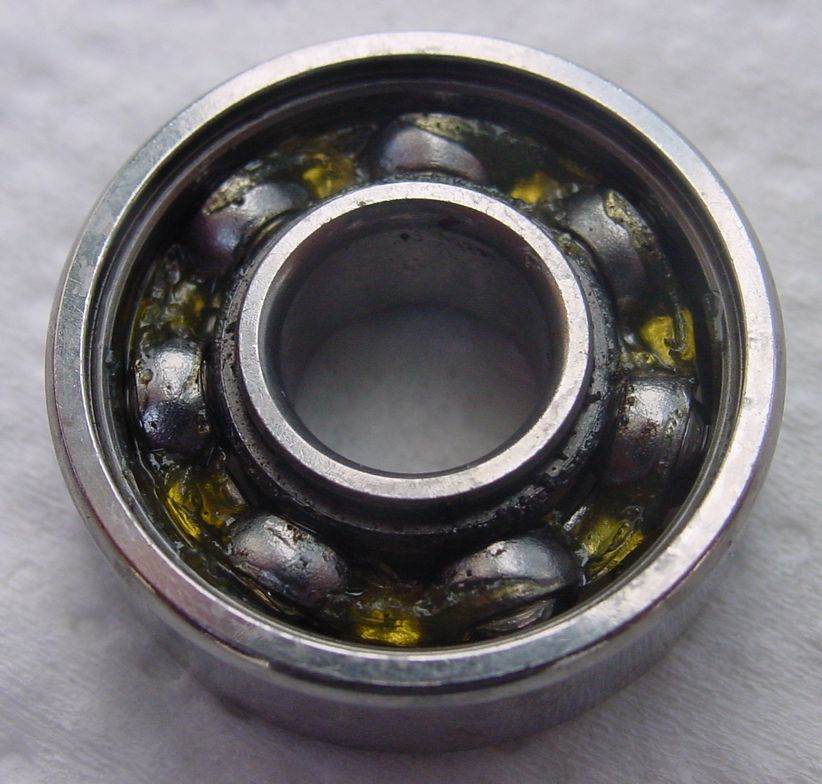
Heavy grease

RSL seals: full-contact rubber seals with a labyrinth lip profile that lightly touches the inner race, blocking dirt and moisture. These are used with "thick grease" for long-lasting protection with "near-zero maintenance", but cause more "bearing drag". Though they don't spin freely when unloaded, they perform efficiently under a skater's weight, when grease is forced away from ball paths as wheels roll. Dragon Bearings produces "2RSL" models with RSL seals on both sides.

== Skate tuning ==
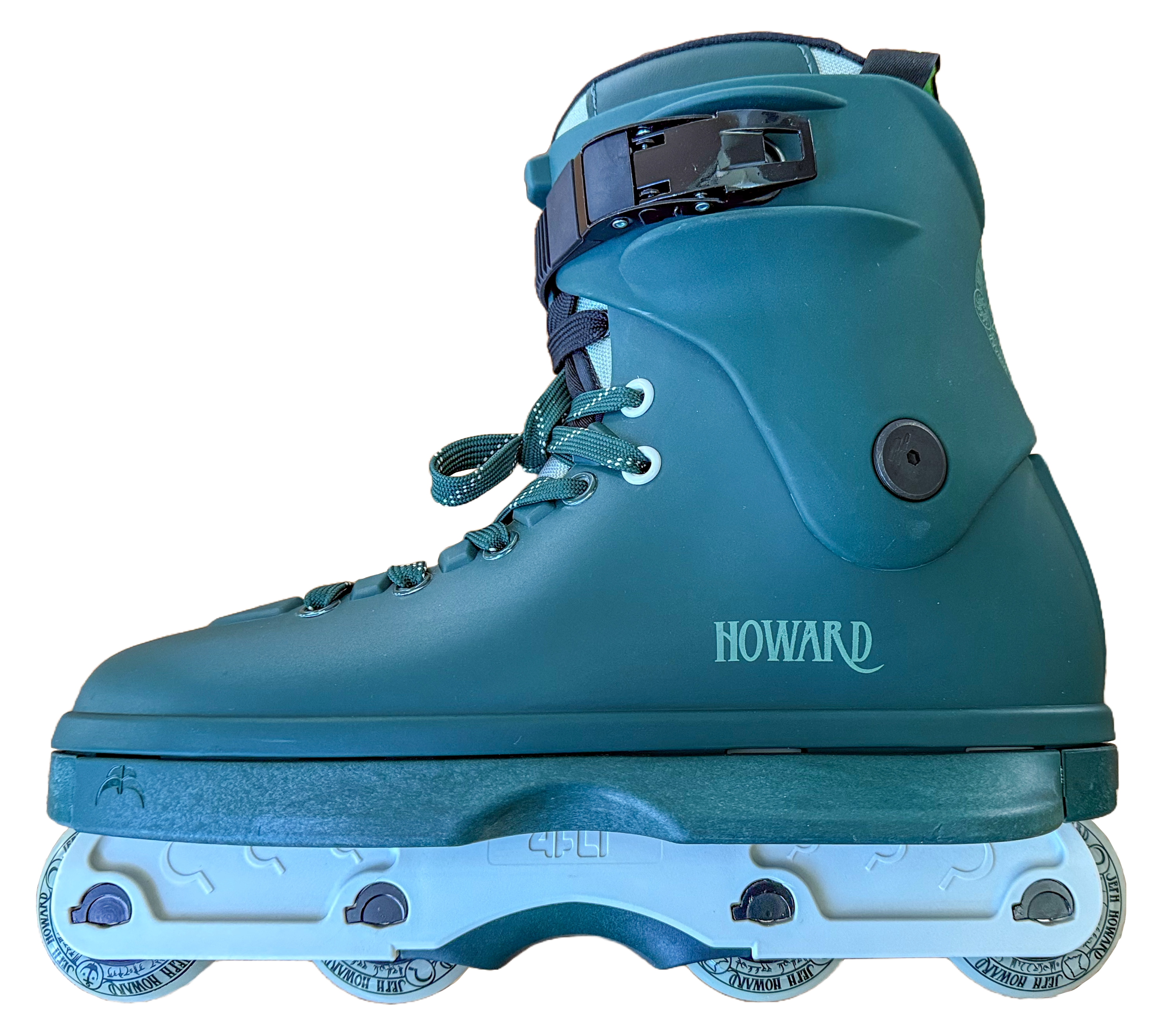
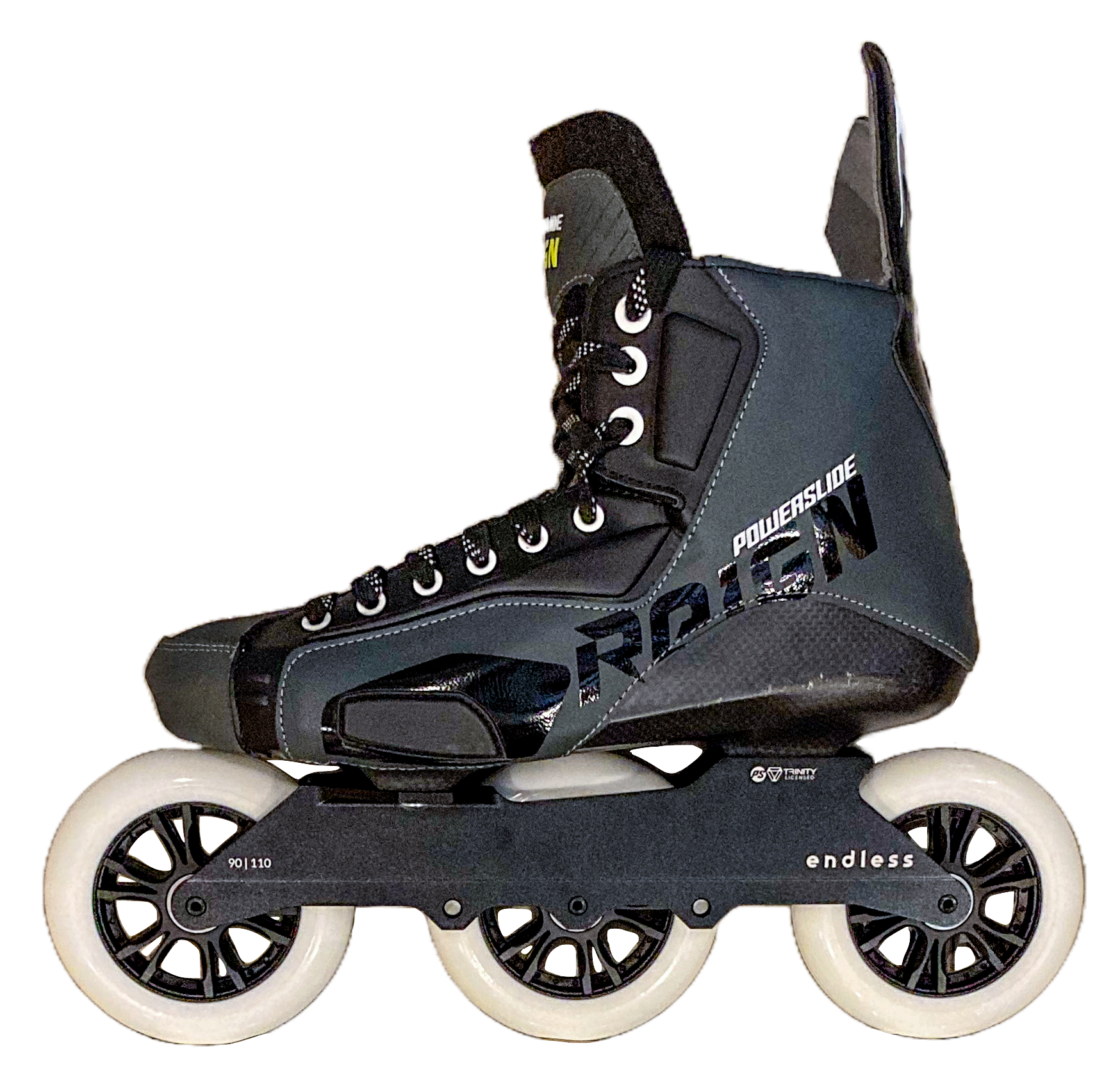
Standard aggro vs. big-wheel urban setup

Skate setup, customization and tuning terms vary by discipline. For instance, urban skaters refers to four larger wheels (e.g. 4x90mm) and triskates with three large wheels (110 mm or more) as "big-wheel setups". In contrast, aggressive skaters consider anything 80 mm or larger to be big-wheel. On the other hand, large wheels are standard for marathon skaters, and a triskate under 125 mm is seen as small and unusual. Terms like "big-wheel" and "triskate" also imply specific frame and boot designs, as setups with 125 mm wheels need stronger frames and more supportive boots to handle increased speed and leverage.

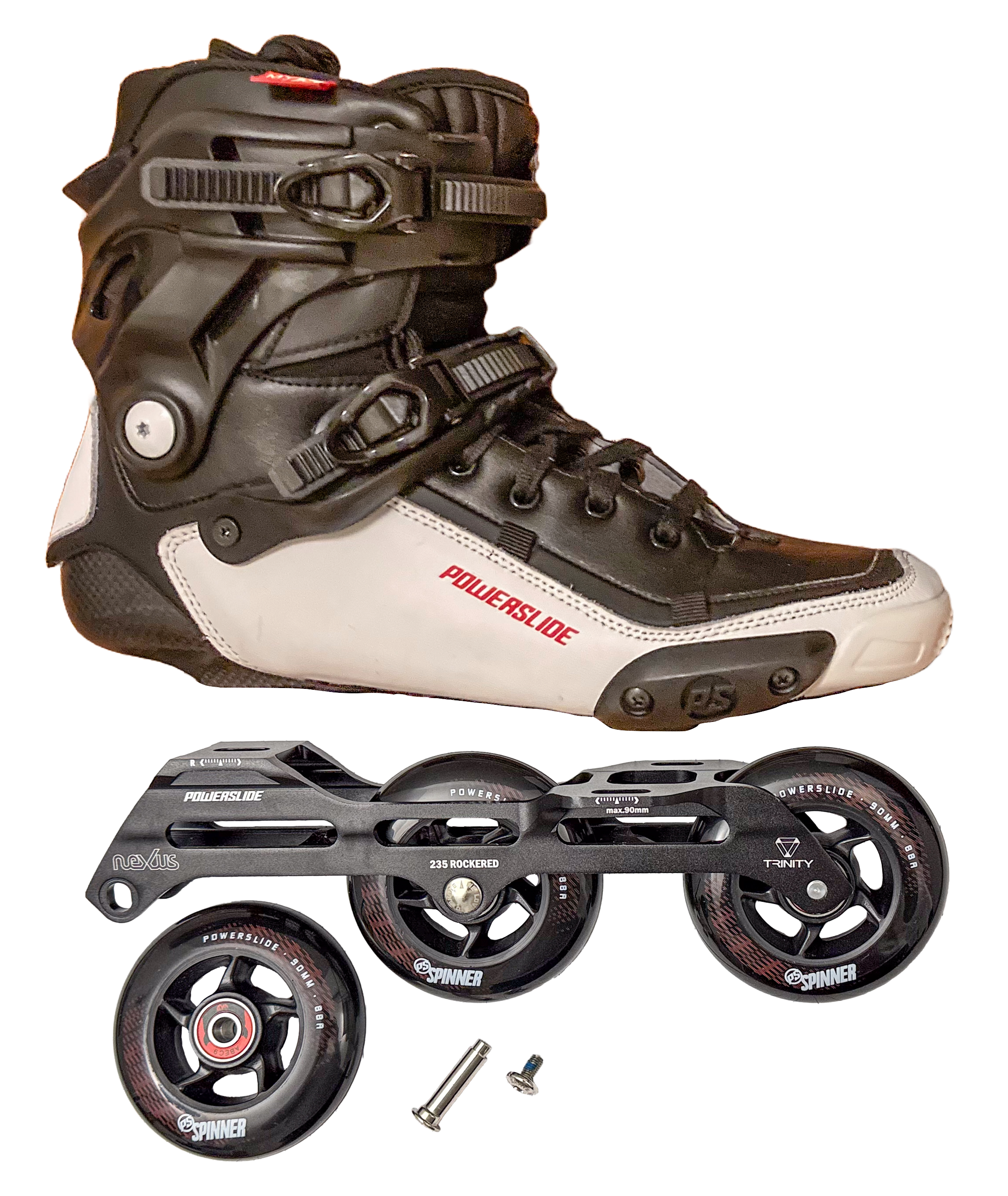
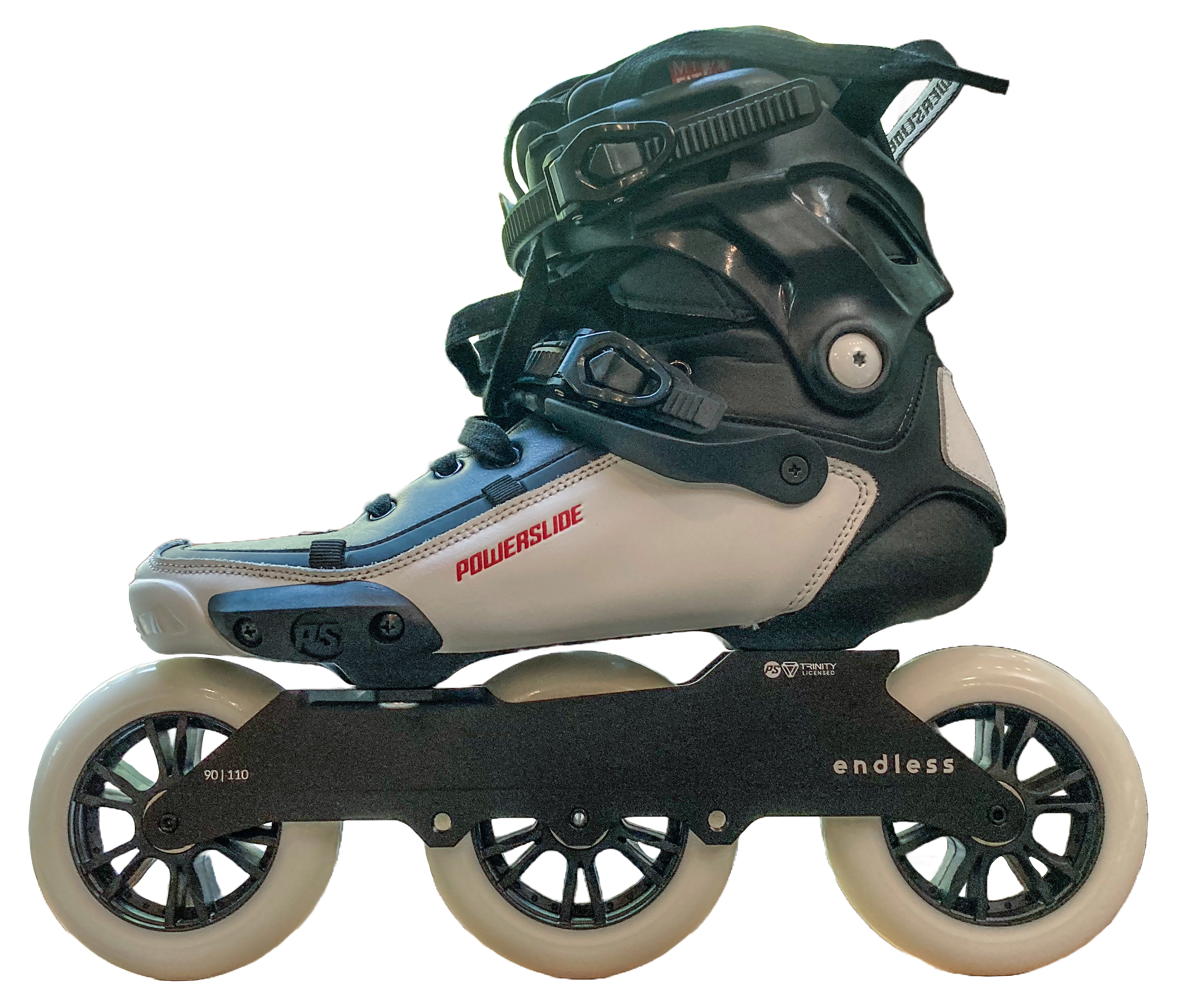
Same boot on different frames and wheels

A wheel setup generally refers to both the number and size of wheels. Common examples include 4x80mm for recreational use, and 3x110mm, popular with urban skaters in the 2020s. Older 5x80mm setups, once used in speed skating, are now mainly seen in wizard skating. Wheel setups also involve "wheel arrangement", which affects performance. A flat setup has all wheels touching the ground. A rockered setup raises the front and rear wheels for a curved profile. A hi-lo setup uses decreasing wheel sizes frontward (e.g. 80-78-76-74 mm)), keeping all wheels grounded but raising the heel for a forward-leaning stance.

Skaters can customize one boot with different wheel setups for various purposes. A short frame with 80 mm soft wheels suits indoor use, while a longer frame with larger and harder 110 mm wheels works better for outdoor distance skating. Some frames, like the Endless 90, support both 4x90mm and 3x110mm setups. Even without changing the frame or boot, switching wheels with different hardness, rebound, diameter, or profile can significantly alter the skating experience.

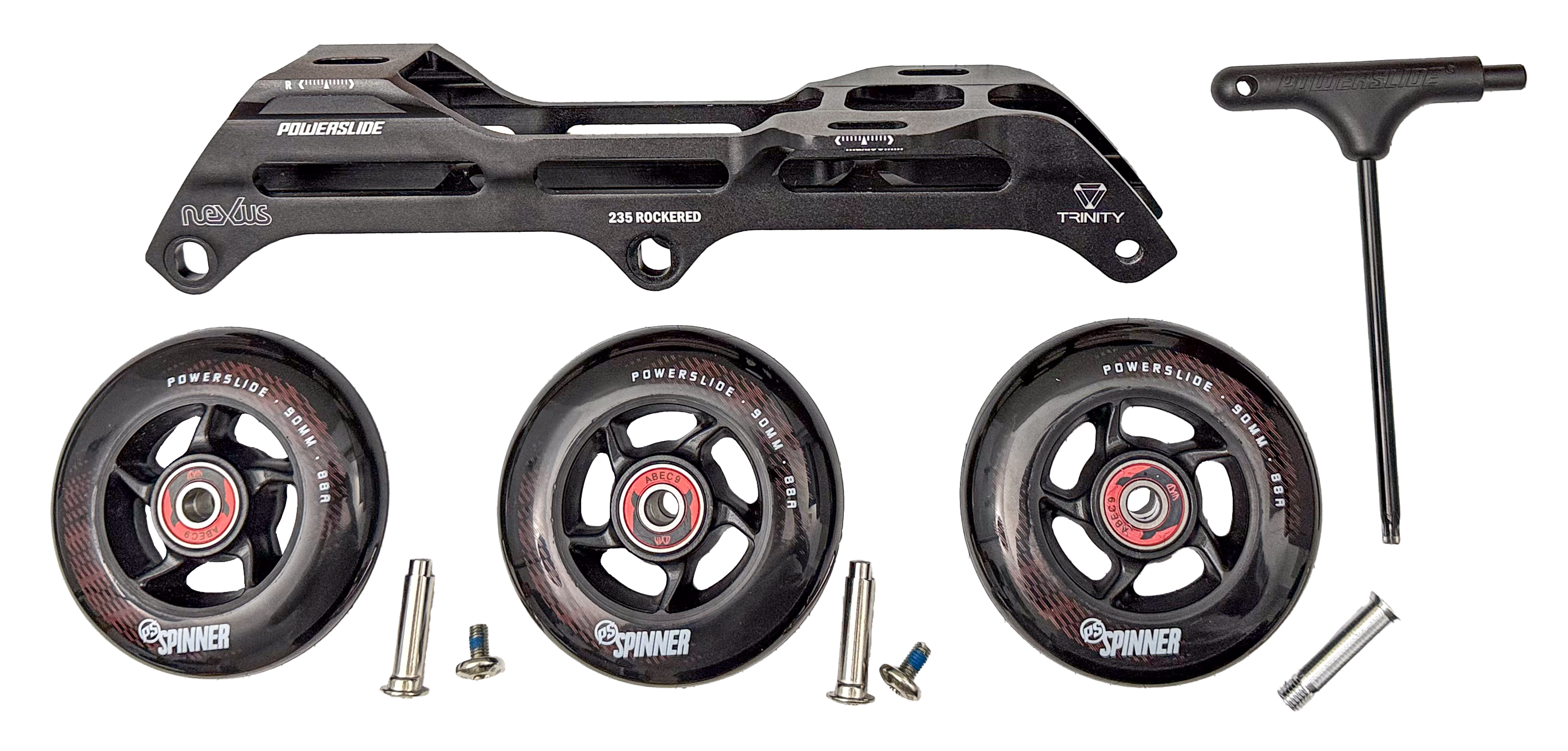
Some components of a skate

An "axle assembly" includes the rods, screws, bolts, and bushings that secure a wheel to the frame. A "bearing assembly" has two ball bearings with a spacer and, when placed in a wheel hub with a tire, forms a "wheel assembly". A "frame assembly" refers to all skate components except the boot and wheel assemblies. For recreational skates, this includes the frame, brake, boot-mounting hardware, and axle assemblies. In aggressive skates, it may also include H-blocks and parts for grinding.

=== Wheel rotation ===
1-3/2-4 rotation

4-1-2-3 rotation

Hi-lo rotation

Inline skate wheels wear down with use and need periodic "rotation" and eventual "replacement". Front wheels and inside edges wear faster, especially on the dominant foot, thus usually the right foot for right-handed skaters. Uneven wear can distort the wheel profile, and severely worn wheels risk de-coring (disbonding from wheel hub) during use.

Regular wheel rotation helps distribute wear evenly, extending lifespan of the entire set. This includes "repositioning" less-worn wheels to high-wear axles to balance diameter differences, "flipping" wheels to even out lopsided edge wear from motions such as push-offs, and "swapping" wheels between skates to address asymmetrical wear from foot dominance.

1-3/2-4 rotation is a common rotation pattern for four-wheel setups in the 21st century. It exchanges the first wheel with the third and the second with the fourth, repositioning them to balance diameter differences. Simultaneously, wheels are swapped between skates, flipping inside and outside edges to correct lopsided edge wear and foot dominance effects. Eventually, all wheels wear out and are replaced as a set.

4-1-2-3 rotation is another common method, and it predates 1-3/2-4. This was first documented in the 1985 book Rollerblades: Dryland Training for Ice Hockey. The front wheel moves to the fourth axle, while all others shift forward one position. The 4-1-2-3 rotation lets each wheel pass through all axle positions, promoting even wear and enabling full set replacement when needed.

Hi-lo rotation eliminates abrupt changes in effective wheel diameters which occur with other rotation patterns when all wheels are fully-worn and replaced as a set. With this method, all eight wheels are removed, sorted by observed diameter, and stacked from largest to smallest. The two most worn may be discarded and replaced with new ones. Wheels are then remounted by increasing size, starting with the smallest on the front of the non-dominant skate, and ending with the largest on the rear of the dominant skate. This creates a hi-lo wheel setup that mimics forward flex and maintains consistent ride height across rotations.

=== Bearing alignment ===
Recess & abutment

Outer/inner races

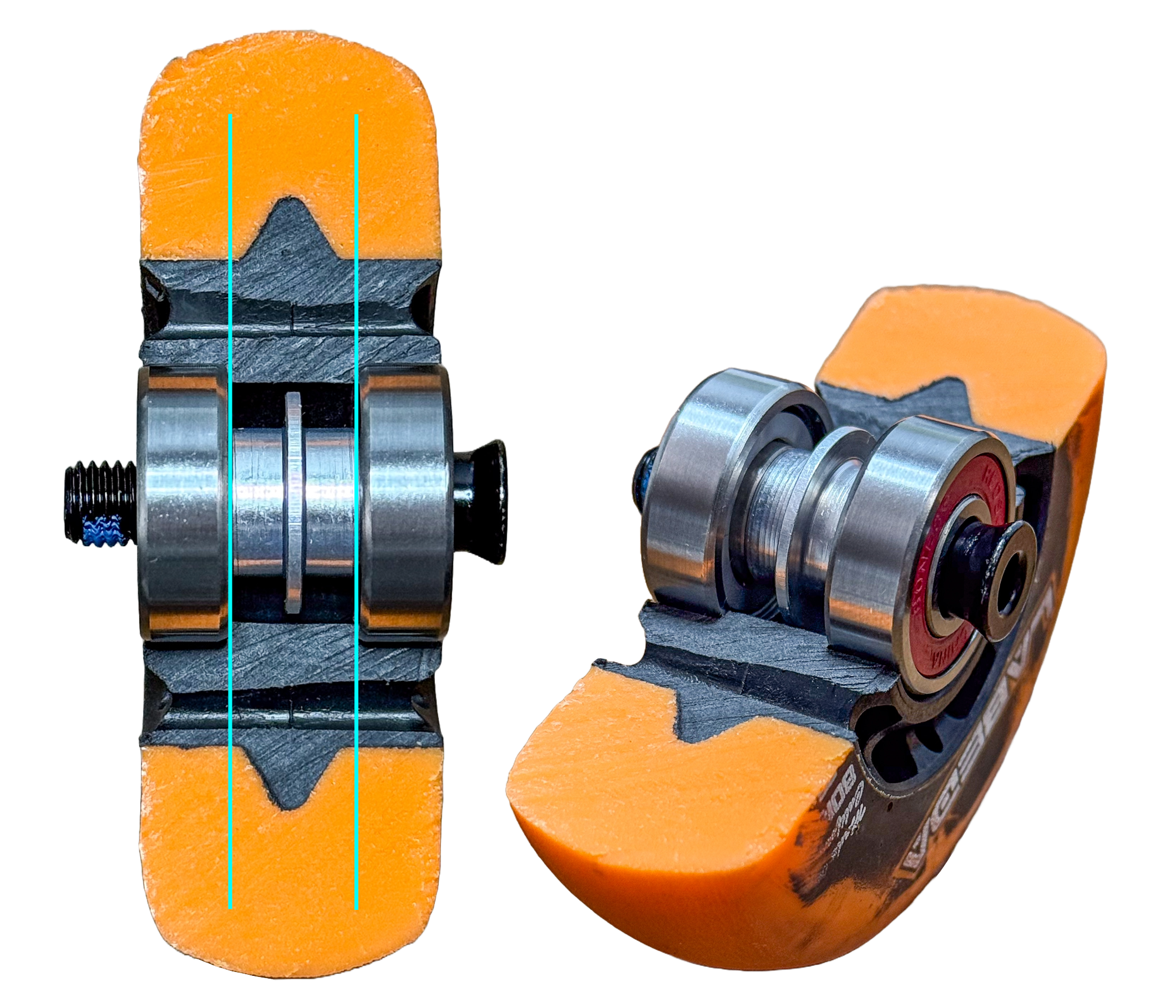
Bearing planes

Bearing misalignment is one of the most harmful issues in skating, second only to dirt contamination in bearings. When customizing or replacing wheels, bearings must be re-installed carefully. Misalignment can cause wheels to tilt, roll unevenly, drag against the frame, vibrate, and overheat. This reduces performance, risks tire debonding, and leads to premature wear of bearings and axles.

In the 1980s, Rollerblade and Kryptonics developed plastic hubs with precise, rigid "bearing seats" to align bearings accurately. Each 7 mm deep "bearing recess" matches the width of an ISO 608 bearing, allowing flush mounting with press-fit. This leaves a 10 mm gap between two bearings mounted on a hub standardized at 24 mm wide. This gap is filled by a "bearing abutment" molded into the hub to position and support the bearings.

A ball bearing has two concentric races that rotate relative to each other. The outer race is secured to the hub and rotates with the wheel, while the inner race stays stationary with the axle assembly. A "spacer" matching the 10 mm bearing abutment fits between the inner races. Tightening the axle bolt clamps the frame around the bearing assembly, creating a rigid structure that binds the axle, spacer, and inner races, securing them to the frame and boot.

The bearing abutment and outer race of each bearing together define a "bearing plane". Both planes should be parallel and exactly 10 mm apart, with the spacer and inner races meeting at these same planes. Proper "bearing alignment" means all these geometric relationships are correctly maintained.

=== Side load support ===
Vertical load & radial play

Side load and axial play

ISO 608 bearings in inline skates are deep groove ball bearings (radial ball bearings), designed primarily to handle radial loads - forces applied perpendicular to the axle from the skater's weight. These loads pass from the boot through the frame and axles to the inner races and balls, pressing against the outer races. Radial load in skating is thus colloquially known as "vertical load".

Radial ball bearings are also capable of handling a certain amount of axial load from both directions. These are side forces along the axle produced by maneuvers that involve a deep edge, such as turning, crossovers, power slides, power stops, and techniques like slalom or the double push. Axial load in skating is colloquially known as "side load".

Some purpose-built bearings, such as the Bones Swiss, are designed with larger internal clearance (gaps between the balls and raceways) to better accommodate side loading. This enables increased "axial play" (or axial clearance), an intentional design and not a sign of lower precision. It allows the inner race to shift laterally relative to the outer race, changing the contact angle between balls and raceways to better support axial loads without binding.

=== Bearing preload ===
Radial play results in uneven load

Preload ensures even load distribution

Greater internal clearance in skate bearings helps prevent binding during side-loading maneuvers. However, it creates an uneven load distribution, with only the bottom ball and its neighbors supporting the skater's weight. These form the "load-bearing zone", while the other balls remain unloaded. As balls rotate through the bearing, they briefly enter the load-bearing zone and endure stress beyond their design limits, accelerating wear. At the top of rotation, balls lose contact due to clearance gaps, causing skidding, noise, energy loss, and more wear. Uneven surfaces add shifting forces that, combined with the clearance, cause axle vibrations and worsen bearing misalignment.

Bearing preload in inline skates refers to a specific type of axial load - that from clamping the inner race against a properly sized spacer using the axle bolt, pre-tensioning the bearing balls at an oblique contact angle. This reduces or removes internal clearance, keeping all balls engaged and evenly distributing the skater's weight during wheel rotation.

=== Spacer length ===
Optimal spacer length

Preloading is especially useful in high-speed skating, like downhill racing, where it removes clearance gaps, reduces skidding, and minimizes axle displacement. This improves wheel assembly's structural rigidity, and increases skater's stability, precision and control. By using a correctly sized spacer, the axle bolt can apply just enough tension to create a slight negative internal clearance (around -0.01 mm), the "optimal preload". This delivers optimal load distribution and load-carrying capacity, minimizing wear and maximizing bearing lifespan.

Short spacer binds wheels

Short spacer: Manufacturing imperfections often prevent spacers from perfectly matching the bearing abutment length. If a spacer is too short, overtightening the axle bolt beyond the optimal preload tension can create excessive negative clearance, increasing friction and drastically reducing bearing lifespan. In severe cases, it may cause the bearing balls to bind and lock the wheels. (Note: See charts from NASA research and bearing manufacturers that illustrate bearing life as a function of internal clearance in radial ball bearings. At approximately -0.01 mm clearance (representing optimal preload), bearing life reaches 100%. If under-tensioned (i.e. the axle bolt is not fully tightened), bearing life drops by nearly half with a positive clearance gap of 0.05 mm. Conversely, if over-tensioned (i.e. using a spacer that is too short), an additional negative clearance of just -0.01 mm can reduce bearing life to 20%.) To address this, aluminum spacers are made in various lengths so skaters can match them to each wheel's exact dimensions. (Note: A Wicked spacer kit (archived) includes assorted spacers of these lengths: 9.90 mm, 9.95 mm, 10.00 mm 10.05 mm, 10.10 mm, 10.15 mm, (10.20 mm), 10.25 mm, 10.30 mm, 10.35 mm.)

Loose axle w. short spacer

Loose axle: To fix over-tension from short spacers, some skaters mistakenly loosen axle bolts, thinking it relieves excess preload. While this may let wheels spin freely, it causes the spacers and inner races to rattle and skid, producing clunking sounds. The inner races are no longer clamped, leading to bearing misalignment and excessive wear from side loads. This creates cycles of over-preload and under-tension, worsening damage. Omitting spacers exacerbates the issue, potentially causing bearings to explode under strong side forces.

Slightly longer than optimal

Long spacer: If a perfect spacer isn't available, a slightly longer spacer is preferred over a shorter one, to avoid over-tension and excessive bearing wear. While a longer spacer prevents preload by not pushing outer races against bearing abutments, it still allows the inner races and spacer to be securely clamped. Without preload, however, the outer races rely solely on press-fit against the bearing recesses, which may not hold under side loads. This can cause the outer races to shift, wear the hub's bearing recess, and lead to lateral wheel movement and clicking sounds during skating.

== Wheel setup ==
Wheel setup can refer to various aspects related to the selection and configuration of wheels. The total number of wheels and their diameter are often expressed in the form {number of wheels} x {wheel diameter in mm}. For instance, a common recreational skate setup is 4x80mm, which means four wheels, each with a diameter of 80 millimeters. Wheel arrangement patterns are typically named according to the profile formed by the wheels at their contact points with the ground. In a flat setup, all wheels maintain contact with the ground simultaneously. A classic rockered setup, by contrast, creates a banana-like profile along the bottom.

=== Flat setup ===
Flat wheel setup: 4x80mm

A flat setup is the most common wheel configuration used on inline skates. The majority of skates are sold with this arrangement. In a flat setup, all wheels make contact with the ground simultaneously when the skate is rolling on a level surface. While not as maneuverable as a rockered setup, a flat setup excels in disciplines that prioritize speed, stability, and long-distance efficiency. It is the standard choice for speed skaters and marathon skaters. Flat wheel setups are typically noted in the format {number of wheels} x {wheel diameter in mm}. For example, a common recreational setup is 4x80mm or simply 4x80, indicating four wheels, each with a diameter of 80 millimeters.

=== Rockered setup ===
Rockering with frame hardware

A rockered setup, also called a "full rockered setup" or "banana rocker", involves altering the wheel alignment to increase maneuverability. In a four-wheel inline skate, this typically means raising the bottom of the front and rear wheels by about 2 millimeters, so that only the two middle wheels touch the ground when standing on a flat surface. This setup mimics the profile of an ice skate blade, and is known as the "banana" rocker after its curved profile.

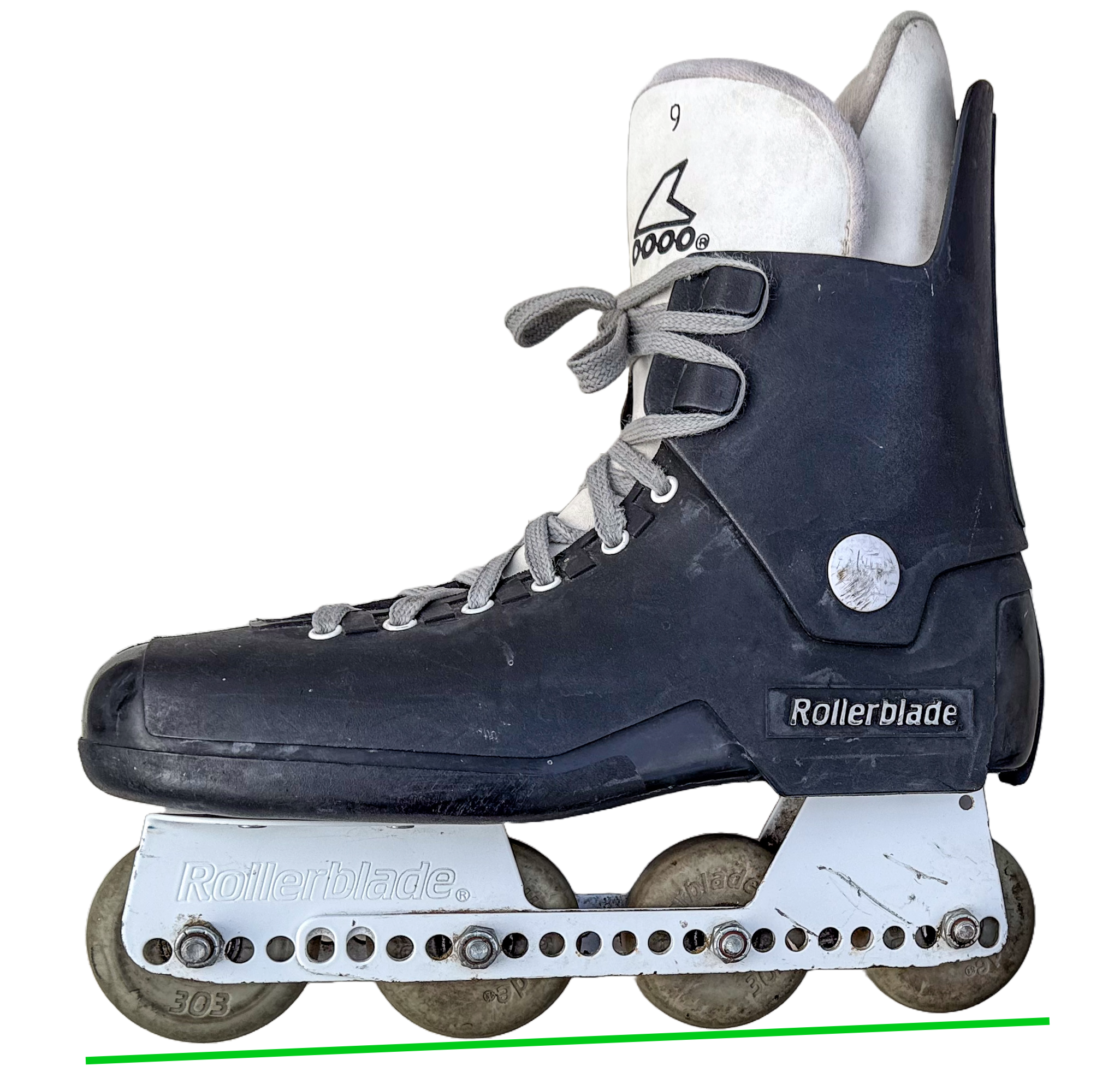
70-70-70-70 rockered

A rockered setup generally produces the opposite skating characteristics of a flat setup. It offers much greater maneuverability and allows for quicker, easier turning. Freestyle slalom skaters and artistic inline skaters consider the rockered setup indispensable, as it enables gliding on just the front two wheels, the middle two wheels, or the rear two wheels, depending on the move. Having a short frame in combination with a full rocker is optimum for achieving the highest maneuverability when skating. However, this setup makes it more difficult to maintain stability at high speeds, since the skater cannot glide on all four wheels at once and is more prone to wheel wobbles when skating in a straight line.

Rockering by sizing wheels: 76-80-80-76

A frame designed for a flat setup can still be converted into a rockered configuration by mounting smaller wheels at the front and rear. For example, a standard 4x80mm flat frame can become rockered by installing 76 mm wheels at the front and rear, while keeping 80 mm wheels in the middle. This customization creates a 2 mm height offset between the outer and middle wheels, mimicking the standard banana rocker profile. Skaters commonly notate mixed wheel sizes in millimeters, listed from the rear wheel to the front. The rockered configuration described above is typically written as "76-80-80-76".

=== Natural rocker ===
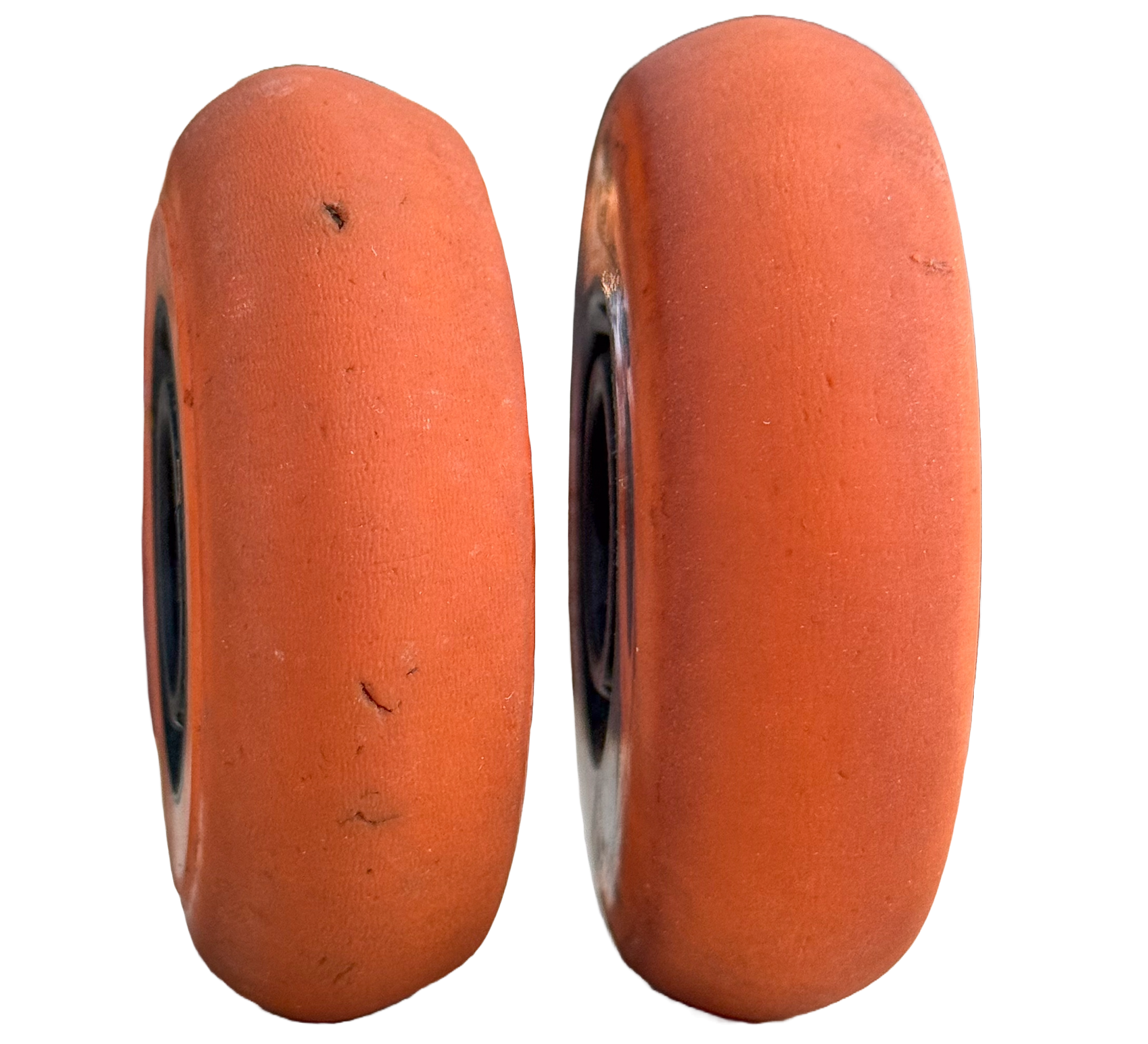
Severely worn (left) vs moderately worn (right)

Natural rockering can develop naturally on flat frames due to uneven wheel wear. Beginners often wear down front wheels faster, creating a natural hi-lo setup over time without needing different-sized wheels. Specific skating styles can also wear front and rear wheels more than the middle ones, forming a natural rocker. As wheels wear down, skaters can employ various rotation strategies to either restore a flat setup or enhance the rocker. Although natural rockering usually produces less than the standard 2 mm height difference, many skaters prefer this subtle profile. "Big-wheel" urban skaters and wizard skating advocates often use factory-tuned, pre-rockered frames designed to mimic this naturally worn rocker with new wheels of same size. Wizard even named its classic four-wheel frame NR, after natural rocker.

=== Front rocker ===
Front rocker wheel setup: 80-80-80-76

A front rocker setup raises only the front wheel, while the remaining three wheels stay in a flat configuration. This design serves as a compromise between a full rockered setup and a flat setup. A skater achieves greater top speed and improved stability with less wheel wobble on this setup, compared to a full rockered setup, by striding and gliding primarily on the three rear wheels. At the same time, the raised front wheel helps guide the skate over uneven terrain in urban environments.

=== Hi-lo setup ===
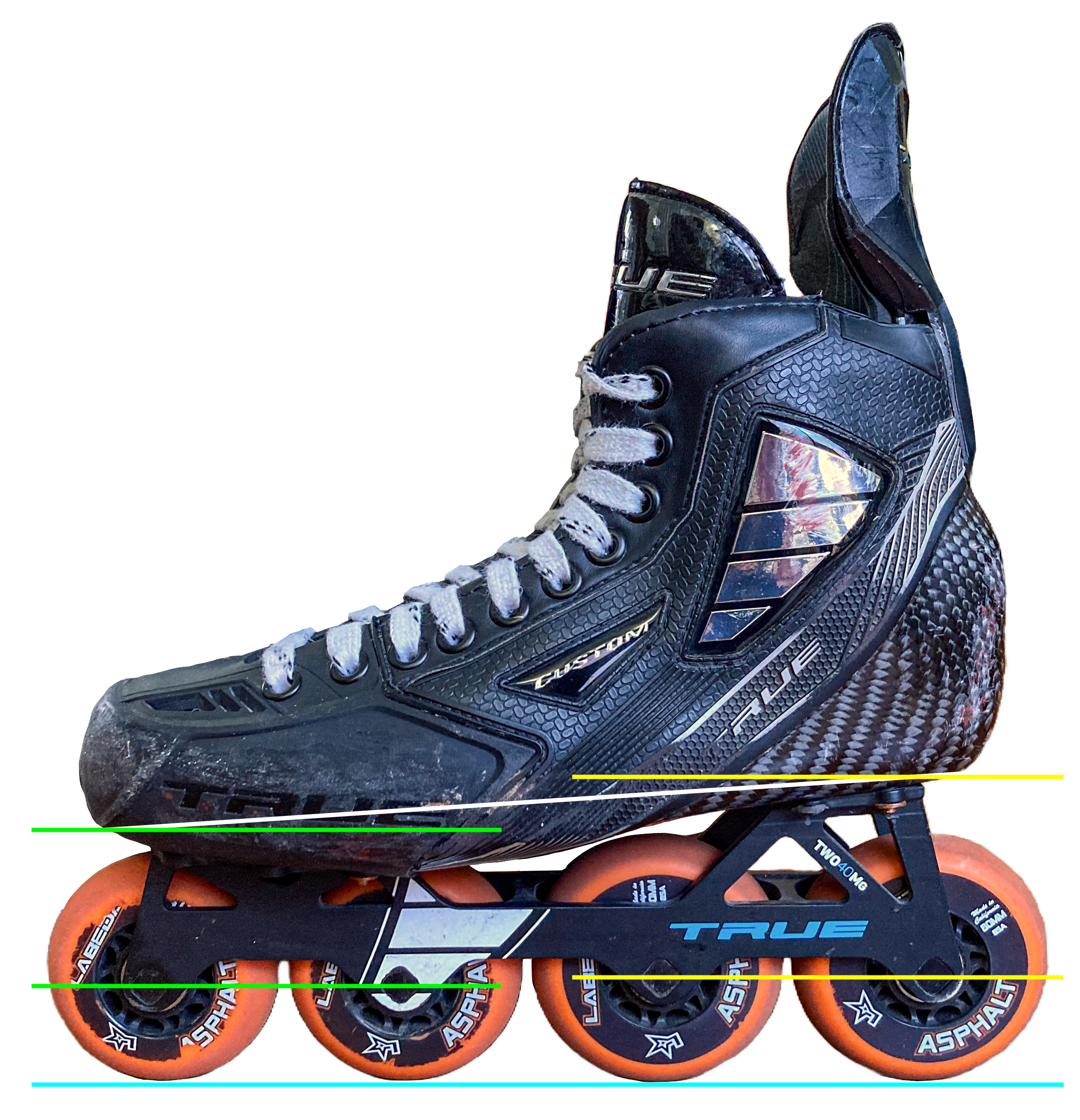
80-80-76-76 hi-lo frame

The hi-lo setup, also known as "HiLo", is commonly found in hockey skates. Hi-lo is technically a flat setup, since all wheels maintain contact with the ground when the skate rests on a level surface. The term “hi-lo” refers not to the wheel contact profile, but to the orientation of the boot. It raises the heel and lowers the toe, creating a "heel-to-toe drop" that encourages a natural forward lean. This forward flex promotes a more aggressive stance, enhances push-off power, and helps prevent backward falls. Unlike terms like flat or rockered, which describe how wheels touch the ground, “hi-lo” describes how the boot is angled forward.

Hi-lo hockey frame

This forward pitch can be achieved through a combination of frame design and wheel sizing. Some frames have built-in height offsets, resulting in a heel raise, common in hockey skates and standard on 165mm, 195mm, and Trinity mounts. However, this lift increases ride height, which can reduce stability. To counter this, hi-lo hockey frames use lower axle positions and smaller wheels toward the toe, keeping the front low while preserving forward lean and keeping ride height low. A typical hi-lo frame is annotated as "80-80-76-76", combining better power transfer during push-offs with improved control and stability.

Hi-lo setups with smaller front wheels are often marketed as providing quicker acceleration, while the larger rear wheels are said to help with achieving and maintaining top speed. While it is true that smaller wheels accelerate more quickly and larger wheels maintain speed more easily, these performance traits are not the reason for the hi-lo configuration. The smaller front wheels are used out of necessity - to lower the toe of the boot and preserve the forward pitch - rather than for their isolated performance benefits alone. In practice, the smaller front wheels trade top speed for a lower and more stable ride. (Note: Misleading marketing is common, where hi-lo frames are advertised as offering quicker acceleration due to the smaller front wheels and higher top speeds thanks to the larger rear wheels. These claims often ignore the primary design purpose: creating forward lean by allowing the front of the boot to sit lower, which enhances forward pitch and skating posture. See for instance, Hi-lo Frames from Powerslide (archived here), and A Guide to Roller Hockey Wheels from Willies (archived here). If these marketing claims were entirely accurate, we would expect to see hockey frames with extremely small front wheels (e.g. 50 mm) and oversized rear wheels (e.g. 110 mm) to further enhance acceleration and top speed, without any design features to leverage vacated front space to pitch the boot forward. In reality, such frames do not exist.)

Many skaters casually refer to any mixed-size wheel configuration as a "rocker", which leads to the common but inaccurate use of the term "hi-lo rocker" to describe a standard hi-lo setup. This is a poor choice of words, as the hi-lo setup is a flat configuration. Some skaters also misuse "rocker" as a general synonym for "wheel setup", leading to additional confusion, such as referring to a flat setup as a "flat rocker". (Note: Even professional skaters occasionally write "hi-lo rocker" when they mean "hi-lo flat". See Thierstein, for instance. Redditors often write "hi-lo rocker", using the word "rocker" for any mixed-size wheel configuration. See this, this and this, for instance.) (Note: Even professional skaters occasionally write "flat rocker" when they mean "flat setup". See This Is Soul, Big Wheel Blading, and Naomi's book, for instance.)

=== Alternatives to hi-lo ===
By sizing wheels: 80-78-76-74

Hi-lo via rotation

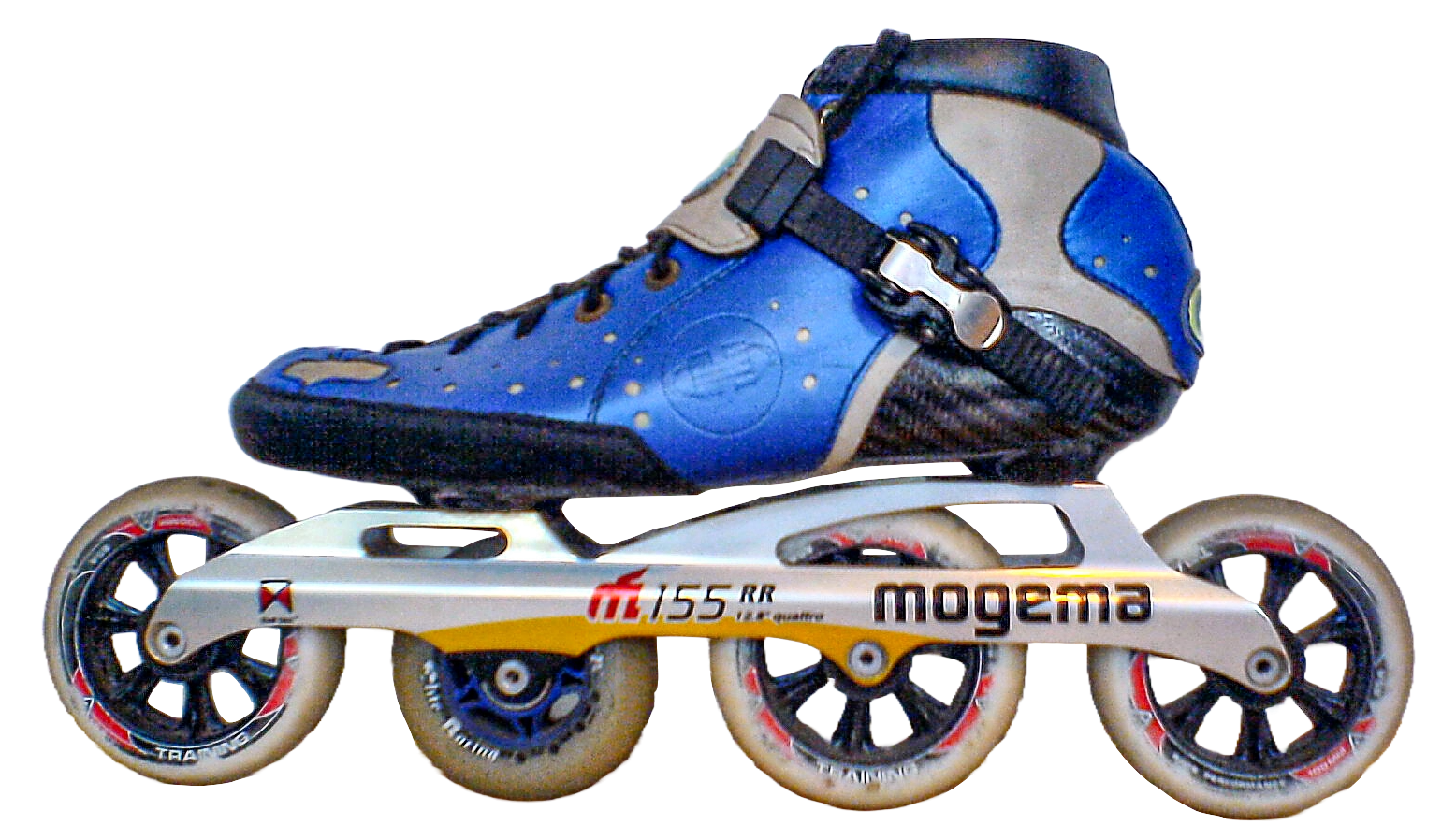
Smaller 2nd wheel

Hi-lo frames are not the only approach to achieving a pitched boot with a low ride height. For instance, a hi-lo setup can be created using a standard flat frame by fitting progressively smaller wheels from rear to front, with a typical hockey setup written as "80-78-76-74". This arrangement produces a total heel-to-toe drop of 6 mm while maintaining full ground contact. Instead of purchasing wheels in different diameters, a skater can gradually create a hi-lo setup through a hi-lo rotation strategy, by placing the most worn at the front and the least worn at the rear. This approach minimizes noticeable changes in ride height between rotations, offering a consistent skating feel over time.

Similarly, speed skaters seek forward flex while using larger wheels, which raise ride height. To low center of gravity, some 165mm frames shift the second axle or use a smaller second wheel to lower the front. Similarly, the ROCKIN' MIX4 100/90 frame uses smaller middle wheels and adjusted axle positions to form a 100-90-90-100 setup, keeping the boot closer to the ground.

The Trinity system takes a different approach, with two front mounting points placed off-center, clearing space above the front wheels so they can sit closer to the boot. This allows setups like the Endless Trinity 90 with 3x110mm wheels to position the toe just 110 mm above the ground. Wizard Skating frames, using the UFS standard, achieve forward pitch by sloping the frame's mounting surface, despite using equal-sized wheels. However, UFS-based setups usually result in a higher ride height compared to Trinity.

=== Forward lean with a rocker ===
Wizard NR with Natural Rocker

A new variation of rockered skating emerged in the early 2010s, led by a new generation of aggressive skaters who rediscovered the benefits of rockered setups, this time using larger wheels on longer frames. Wizard Skating became a key influence. Its frames are made for flat UFS boots but feature a sloped mounting surface that creates a slight forward lean, similar to a hi-lo flat setup. The Wizard NR series is "pre-rockered" with a mild banana rocker named after the natural rocker. The NR90 model uses four equal-sized wheels in a 90-90-90-90 rockered layout.

Ninja NN 90 with V.m Rocker

Similarly, the Endless Blading 90 frame is pre-rockered to support four 90 mm wheels. This setup, branded as the "Balanced Rocker", is another mild version of the banana rocker. The frame uses the 165mm mounting standard, with a built-in forward lean. Another example is the Ninja NN 90 frame from NN Skates, which also features a pre-rockered design. It introduces NN Skates' proprietary "V.m Rocker", short for "modified V Rocker". The 165mm and Trinity versions come with built-in forward lean.

Artificially pivoted view

All of these "pre-rockered frames" are variations of the full rockered setup, combined with built-in forward flex. However, they are sometimes marketed using simplified illustrations that "horizon-correct" the top surface of the frame, showing the boot level and the skate pivoting primarily on the third wheel. This artificial stance is often described as a "V-shaped" wheel-contact profile, a "V rocker", or a "3rd-wheel down" configuration. In practice, however, skaters do not glide on a single wheel. Instead, they roll on two wheels at a time, such as the 2nd and 3rd, where the boot naturally tilts forward like a hi-lo setup.

Some skaters therefore refer to this combination of forward pitch and rocker as the "hi-lo rocker" or "full hi-lo rocker". However, these terms can be confusing, especially since "hi-lo rocker" is also used colloquially to describe standard hi-lo setups. At present, there is no consistent term for this combination of banana rocker and forward lean in a pre-rockered frame.

=== Anti-rocker setup ===
Typical anti-rocker setup

The anti-rocker setup is the most widely used wheel configuration in aggressive skates. It gets its name from being the opposite of a rockered setup. In an anti-rocker configuration, the two middle wheels are raised off the ground, leaving only the front and rear wheels to make contact on flat surfaces. The middle wheels are typically spaced farther apart than in standard four-wheel setups, and are often made of harder materials with minimal grip. These hard wheels are commonly referred to as grindwheels, antirockers, or anti-rocker wheels. They are designed for one task alone: to make grinding on ledges and rails easier.

=== Freestyle setup ===
Freestyle frame

The freestyle setup is another wheel configuration favored by aggressive skaters. Despite the name, it is unrelated to freestyle slalom around cones or freestyle skating on flat ground free of street obstacles. This setup features only two outer wheels, with the middle portion of the frame replaced by solid material that resembles an extended H-block, optimized for grinding.

Freestyle via juice blocks

Fifty-50's Balance Frame introduced a convertible design that can use either grindwheels or juice blocks in the center. When juice blocks are installed as grind blocks, they fill the space between the frame walls, extending the H-block to form a smooth, solid grinding surface. This transforms the Balance Frame from an anti-rocker setup into a freestyle setup.

== See also ==
- Roller skates - Inline skates are technically a type of roller skate, but roller skates now exclusively refer to quad skates.
- Ice skates - Inline skates traces back to the origin of ice skates, as a way to glide on non-ice surfaces, with wheels.
- Inline skating - Different types of inline skates reflect needs specific to different inline skating disciplines.
- Roller sports - Inline skating is one of many sports that use human-powered roller vehicles, in this case, inline skates.
