= National Skate Patrol =

Volunteer service organization in New York

The National Skate Patrol (NSP) was a volunteer service organization created in New York City in 1992 in order to help roller skaters better interact with the larger public. NSP instructed inline skaters on basic technique, safety equipment, and etiquette.

== History ==
The NSP was created in 2002 by members of the New York Road Skaters Association and the International Inline Skating Association. In 2008, the NSP stopped operations, though some local chapters continued independently.

== Chapters ==
National Skate Patrol was a member-based organization, with individuals located across the country. As of 2022, the following local chapters still exist:

- Boston
- Central Park (New York)
- San Francisco
