= List of Minnesota Timberwolves broadcasters =

== Television ==
=== 2020s ===
Year	Channel	Play-by-play	Color commentator(s)	Courtside reporter	Studio host
2025–26	FanDuel Sports North	Alan Horton or Michael Grady	Jim Petersen	Lea B. Olsen, Ashley Stroehlein, Cayleigh Griffin, or Jon Krawczynski	
2024–25	FanDuel Sports North	Michael Grady	Jim Petersen	Katie Storm, Lea B. Olsen, or Jon Krawczynski	
2023–24	Bally Sports North	Michael Grady	Jim Petersen	Katie Storm, Lea B. Olsen, or Jon Krawczynski	
2022–23	Bally Sports North	Michael Grady	Jim Petersen	Katie Storm, Lea B. Olsen, or Jon Krawczynski	
2021–22	Bally Sports North	Dave Benz	Jim Petersen	Katie Storm, Lea B. Olsen, or Jon Krawczynski	
2020–21	Bally Sports North and WFTC	Dave Benz	Jim Petersen	Robby Incmikoski	Robby Incmikoski

=== 2010s ===
Year	Channel	Play-by-play	Color commentator(s)	Courtside reporter	Studio host
2019–20	Fox Sports North	Dave Benz	Jim Petersen	Marney Gellner or Lea B. Olsen	Annie Sabo
2018–19	Fox Sports North	Dave Benz	Jim Petersen	Marney Gellner	Tom Hanneman
2017–18	Fox Sports North	Dave Benz	Jim Petersen	Marney Gellner	Tom Hanneman
2016–17	Fox Sports North	Dave Benz	Jim Petersen	Marney Gellner	Tom Hanneman
2015–16	Fox Sports North	Dave Benz	Jim Petersen	Marney Gellner or Anthony LaPanta	Tom Hanneman
2014–15	Fox Sports North	Dave Benz	Jim Petersen	Marney Gellner or Anthony LaPanta	Tom Hanneman
2013–14	Fox Sports North	Dave Benz	Jim Petersen	Marney Gellner or Anthony LaPanta	Tom Hanneman
2012–13	Fox Sports North and WFTC	Dave Benz	Jim Petersen	Marney Gellner or Anthony LaPanta	Tom Hanneman
2011–12	Fox Sports North and WFTC	Tom Hanneman	Jim Petersen	Anthony LaPanta	Anthony LaPanta
2010–11	Fox Sports North and WFTC	Tom Hanneman	Jim Petersen	Robby Incmikoski	Robby Incmikoski

=== 2000s ===
Year	Channel	Play-by-play	Color commentator(s)	Courtside reporter	Studio host
2009–10	Fox Sports North and KSTC-TV	Tom Hanneman	Jim Petersen	Telly Hughes	Telly Hughes
2008–09	Fox Sports North and KSTC-TV	Tom Hanneman	Jim Petersen	Telly Hughes	Telly Hughes
2007–08	FSN North and KSTC-TV	Tom Hanneman	Jim Petersen	Telly Hughes	Telly Hughes
2006–07	FSN North and KSTC-TV	Tom Hanneman	Jim Petersen	Marney Gellner	Marney Gellner
2005–06	FSN North and KSTC-TV	Tom Hanneman	Jim Petersen	Marney Gellner	Marney Gellner
2004–05	FSN North and KSTC-TV	Tom Hanneman	Jim Petersen	Marney Gellner	Marney Gellner
2003–04	Fox Sports Net North, KMSP-TV and WFTC	Tom Hanneman	Jim Petersen	Marney Gellner	Marney Gellner
2002–03	Fox Sports Net North, KMSP-TV and WFTC	Tom Hanneman	Mychal Thompson	Marney Gellner	Marney Gellner
2001–02	Fox Sports Net North, KMSP-TV and WFTC	Tom Hanneman	Mychal Thompson	Mike Max	Mike Max
2000–01	Midwest Sports Channel, KARE and KMWB	Sean Grande	Jim Petersen	Tom Hanneman	Tom Hanneman

=== 1990s ===
Year	Channel	Play-by-play	Color commentator(s)	Courtside reporter	Studio host
1999-00	Midwest Sports Channel	Sean Grande	Trent Tucker	Tom Hanneman	Tom Hanneman
1999-00	KARE and KMWB	Sean Grande	Trent Tucker	Tom Hanneman	Tom Hanneman
1998–99	Midwest Sports Channel	Sean Grande	Trent Tucker	Tom Hanneman	Tom Hanneman
1998–99	KARE, and KLGT-TV/KMWB	Sean Grande	Trent Tucker	Tom Hanneman	Tom Hanneman
1997–98	Midwest Sports Channel	Gus Johnson	Chad Hartman	Michele Tafoya; Tom Hanneman	Michele Tafoya; Tom Hanneman
1997–98	KARE and KLGT-TV	Kevin Harlan	Trent Tucker	Tom Hanneman	Tom Hanneman
1996–97	Midwest Sports Channel	Gus Johnson	Chad Hartman	Michele Tafoya; Tom Hanneman	Michele Tafoya; Tom Hanneman
1996–97	KARE and KLGT-TV	Kevin Harlan	Trent Tucker	Tom Hanneman	Tom Hanneman
1995–96	Midwest Sports Channel	Chad Hartman	Trent Tucker	Michele Tafoya; Tom Hanneman	Michele Tafoya; Tom Hanneman
1995–96	KARE and KLGT-TV	Kevin Harlan	Trent Tucker	Tom Hanneman	Tom Hanneman
1994–95	Prime Sports Upper Midwest	Chad Hartman	Kevin McHale	Tom Hanneman	Tom Hanneman
1994–95	KARE and KLGT-TV	Kevin Harlan	Kevin McHale	Tom Hanneman	Tom Hanneman
1993–94	Prime Sports Upper Midwest	Chad Hartman	Kevin McHale	Tom Hanneman	Tom Hanneman
1993–94	KARE and KITN-TV	Kevin Harlan	Kevin McHale	Tom Hanneman	Tom Hanneman
1992–93	Prime Sports Upper Midwest	Chad Hartman	Quinn Buckner	Tom Hanneman	Tom Hanneman
1992–93	KARE and KITN-TV	Kevin Harlan	Quinn Buckner	Tom Hanneman	Tom Hanneman
1991–92	Prime Sports Upper Midwest	Jerry Schemmel	Greg Kelser	Tom Hanneman	Tom Hanneman
1991–92	KSTP-TV and KITN-TV	Kevin Harlan	Quinn Buckner	Tom Hanneman (KITN-TV)	Tom Hanneman (KITN-TV)
1990–91	Prime Sports Upper Midwest	Jerry Schemmel	Sidney Lowe	Tom Hanneman	
1990–91	KSTP-TV and KITN-TV	Kevin Harlan	Sidney Lowe	Tom Hanneman	

=== 1980s ===
Year	Channel	Play-by-play	Color commentator(s)	Courtside reporter	Studio host
1989–90	KSTP-TV and KITN-TV	Kevin Harlan	Len Elmore	Tom Hanneman	Tom Hanneman

== Radio ==
=== 2010s ===
Year	Flagship Station	Play-by-play	Color commentator(s)
2017–18	WCCO	Alan Horton	
2016–17	WCCO	Alan Horton	
2015–16	WCCO	Alan Horton	
2014–15	WCCO	Alan Horton	
2013–14	WCCO	Alan Horton	
2012–13	WCCO	Alan Horton	
2011–12	WCCO	Alan Horton	
2010–11	KFAN	Alan Horton	

=== 2000s ===
Year	Flagship Station	Play-by-play	Color commentator(s)
2009–10	KFAN	Alan Horton	
2008–09	KFAN	Alan Horton	Kevin Lynch
2007–08	KLCI	Alan Horton	Billy McKinney
2006–07	KLCI	Brian Sieman	Billy McKinney
2005–06	KFAN	Chad Hartman	Billy McKinney
2004–05	KFAN	Chad Hartman	Billy McKinney
2003–04	KFAN	Chad Hartman	J. B. Bickerstaff
2002–03	KFAN	Chad Hartman	Jim Petersen
2001–02	KFAN	Chad Hartman	Jim Petersen
2000–01	KFAN	Chad Hartman	Walter Bond

=== 1990s ===
Year	Flagship Station	Play-by-play	Color commentator(s)
1999-00	KFAN	Chad Hartman	Jim Petersen
1998–99	KFAN	Chad Hartman	Jim Petersen
1997–98	KFAN	Chad Hartman	
1996–97	KFAN	Kevin Harlan or Chad Hartman	Chad Hartman (Non-televised games)
1995–96	KFAN	Kevin Harlan or Chad Hartman	Chad Hartman (Non-televised games)
1994–95	KFAN	Kevin Harlan or Chad Hartman	Chad Hartman (Non-televised games)
1993–94	KFAN	Kevin Harlan or Chad Hartman	Chad Hartman (Non-televised games)
1992–93	KFAN	Kevin Harlan or Chad Hartman	Chad Hartman (Non-televised games)
1991–92	KFAN	Kevin Harlan or Chad Hartman	Chad Hartman (Non-televised games)
1990–91	WDGY	Kevin Harlan or Jerry Schemmel	Chad Hartman

=== 1980s ===
Year	Flagship Station	Play-by-play	Color commentator(s)
1989–90	WDGY	Kevin Harlan or Dave Shea	

== See also ==
- List of current National Basketball Association broadcasters
