= Patrick Reusse =

American sportswriter

Patrick Reusse is an American sportswriter and radio personality in the Minneapolis–Saint Paul area of Minnesota.

== Biography ==
Reusse (born October 17, 1945) grew up in Fulda, Minnesota. He writes for the Star Tribune of Minneapolis, where his columns appear on Sunday and Thursday. Reusse has also been with radio station KSTP-AM 1500 since 1980, where he hosted Reusse & Company from 2009-2010, Reusse & Mackey with Phil Mackey from 2010 to 2014, The Ride with Reusse weekdays from 2014 until September 7, 2018, and co-hosted Sports Talk with Joe Soucheray in various forms (Sunday Night Sports Talk from 1980-1982, Monday Night Sports Talk from 1983-1993, Saturday Sports Talk from 1985-2011, and weekday Sports Talk from 2010-2018). He later co-hosted Saturday Sports Talk with Judd Zulgad from 2011-2018 after Joe left the show. He currently co-hosts the weekly podcasts Reusse and Judd Unchained with Judd Zulgad since November 26, 2018, a revival of Monday Night Sports Talk with Joe Soucheray since October 7, 2019, and Reusse on Baseball since April 2, 2019 with former KSTP Twins beat writer Derek Wetmore, Manny Hill, or Chris Reuvers, which both happened to be his former radio producers on The Ride with Reusse. He also contributes to the Garage Logic podcast with SportsTalk co-host Joe Soucheray, and contributes to the Mackey & Judd radio show and other things on KSTP-AM. Reusse was a 20-year panelist on The Sports Show, which aired Sunday nights at 9:30 p.m. on WUCW-TV, with Mike Max, Sid Hartman, and George Chappel, better known by his nickname Dark Star. The show previously aired on cable channels Fox Sports North and Victory Sports One. Reusse had previously done radio commentary for athletics in St. Cloud for KFAM-AM, and wrote for the St. Cloud Times and St. Paul Pioneer Press.

Reusse was one of three finalists for the J. G. Taylor Spink Award in 2020 Baseball Hall of Fame balloting; the award went to Nick Cafardo.

Reusse was selected for the Minnesota Broadcasting Hall of Fame in March 2019, and became part of it in October 2019 along with Dennis Anderson, RJ Fritz, and Chuck Williams.
