= List of Peabody Award winners (1980–1989) =

The following is a list of Peabody Award winners and honorable mentions during the 1980s (1980–1989).

== 1980 ==
Recipient	Area of Excellence
ABC	IBM Presents Baryshnikov on Broadway, directed by Dwight Hemion
ABC	Amber Waves (an ABC Sunday Night Movie directed by Joseph Sargent)
BBC Television	All Creatures Great and Small
Canadian Broadcasting Corporation	The Wonderful World of Science, a radio show for elementary-age children on earth, water, fire, air and man.
Canadian Broadcasting Corporation	Peniel, a radio story from Don Mowatt about a cancer patient at the Cancer Control Agency of BC
CBS Entertainment	Gideon's Trumpet
CBS Entertainment	Playing for Time
CBS News	Universe, a science program hosted by Walter Cronkite
Walter Cronkite	Personal Award for his career in broadcast journalism
Phil Donahue	Personal Award for his interview work on Donahue
Elaine Green (WCPO-TV/Cincinnati, OH)	Personal Award for her interview with a gunman and admitted murderer named James Hoskins who instigated a hostage crisis in the WCPO-TV studios
KCET-TV/Los Angeles, Adrian Malone, and Dr. Carl Sagan	Cosmos
KQED-TV/San Francisco, CA	Broken Arrow: Can a Nuclear Weapons Accident Happen Here?, produced by Stephen Talbot and Jonathan Dann
KTEH-TV/San Jose, CA, Carol Mon Pere, and Sandra Nichols	The Battle of Westlands, a profile of the conflict between agri-business giants and small farmers in California's Central Valley
KUED-TV/Salt Lake City, UT and Thirteen/WNET/New York, NY	"The MX Debate," an episode of Bill Moyers' Journal on the MX missile
Maryland Instructional Television	Terra: Our World, a series on the environment presented by Connie Chung and produced by Steve McCullough
Minnesota Public Radio	A Prairie Home Companion
National Geographic Society and WQED-TV/Pittsburgh, PA	The National Geographic Specials (featuring Mysteries of the Mind (produced by Irwin Rosten), The Superliners: Twilight of an Era (produced by Nicolas Noxon), The Invisible World (produced by Alex Pomasanoff), and Dive to the Edge of Creation (produced by James Lipscomb)
National Public Radio	Jazz Alive!
NBC Radio	The Hallelujah Caucus, an examination by C. D. Jaco of the influence of conservative religion on American politics and society, on The Source.
NBC and Paramount Television	Shōgun
Mary Nissenson (WTVJ-TV/Miami, FL)	Personal Award for Poland: A Changing Nation (parts 1 and 2-4)
Carroll O'Connor	Personal Award for the "Archie Alone" episode of Archie Bunker's Place, which dealt with Archie's grief over the death of wife Edith
Public Broadcasting Service and Robert Geller	The American Short Story, highlighting adaptations of Bernice Bobs Her Hair, Paul’s Case and Almos’ a Man.
San Francisco Opera	The San Francisco Opera Radio Broadcasts
Sol Taishoff	Personal Award for his reportage and critiques on events in radio and television (Taishoff was a co-founder, editor, and publisher of Broadcasting magazine)
Studs Terkel	Personal Award for his work at WFMT/Chicago, IL
WNCN/New York, NY	Institutional Award for overall performance as exemplified by Conversations with Horowitz, an interview with Vladimir Horowitz by David Dubal

== 1981 ==
Recipient	Area of Excellence
Bill Leonard	Personal Award for Leonard's role "in developing the strong CBS News organization"
Danny Kaye	Personal Award for Kaye's work on An Evening with Danny Kaye and The New York Philharmonic (an episode of Live from Lincoln Center) and Skokie
WSMV-TV/Nashville, TN	Institutional Award for WSMV's documentary work, citing "Crime's Children" (on children of prisoners and produced by Alan Griggs), "Hot Cars, Cold Cash" (on auto theft and produced by Mike Devlin), "Split Second Justice" (on police shootings and produced by Jim Travis) and "Crime's Carousel" (on teen offenders and produced by Steve Hall)
KATU-TV/Portland, OR	Institutional Award for KATU's documentary work, citing "Ready on the Firing Line" (produced by Rick Meyers), "Out of the Ashes" (on 1980 eruption of Mount St. Helens and directed by Rich Dargan), and "To Begin Again" (produced by John Armstrong)
WJR/Detroit, MI	"Newsfile: A Bankrupt Court", a series of reports by Gene Fogel and Rod Hansen probing the inner workings of the U.S. District Bankruptcy Court
National Radio Theatre	The Odyssey of Homer, directed by Yuri Rasovsky
Canadian Broadcasting Corporation	Carl Sandburg at Connemara, a radio story produced by Don Mowatt about the poet and his last home
Timothy and Susan Todd (aired on NPR)	The Todds' Teddy Bears Picnic
WQDR-FM/Raleigh, NC	Our Forgotten Warriors: Vietnam Veterans Face the Challenges of the '80s
WLS-TV/Chicago, IL	Award for WLS' Eyewitness News, citing the reports "Traffic Court: Justice or a Joke?" (produced by Andrew Segal) and "So You Need A Driver's License" (produced by Patricia Dean)
WDVM-TV/Washington, DC and John Goldsmith	Now That We've Got Your Interest
NBC and MTM Enterprises	Hill Street Blues
Nebraska Educational Television Network and The Great Amwell Company	The Private History of a Campaign That Failed (aired on PBS)
CBS and Alan Landsburg Productions	Bill
WNET/New York, NY and PBS	Dance in America: Nureyev and The Joffrey Ballet/In Tribute to Nijinsky, produced by Emile Ardolino and Judy Kinberg
KJRH-TV/Tulsa, OK	Project: China, produced by Nancy Saslow
Home Box Office and Ms. Magazine	She's Nobody's Baby: The History of American Women in the 20th Century, directed by Ana Carrigan (the first Peabody awarded to a cable program)
Societe Radio-Canada	Klimbo: Le Lion et La Souris (The Lion and the Mouse)
ABC News	Award for Viewpoint, Nightline, and America Held Hostage: The Secret Negotiations
ABC and T.A.T. Communications	The Wave
WGBH-TV/Boston, MA and Granada TV	The Red Army, produced by Andrew Cockburn and Brian Blake
Eighth Decade Consortium (KOMO-TV, Seattle, WA, KSTP-TV/St. Paul, MN, WCVB-TV/Boston, MA, WJLA-TV/Washington, DC, and WRAL-TV/Raleigh, NC)	Fed Up with Fear, a documentary on fighting crime (produced by Ken Schram, Kathleen Matthews, Cathy Perron, Kevin Duffus, and Peter Peterson)
KTEH-TV/San Jose, CA	The Day After Trinity: J. Robert Oppenheimer and the Atomic Bomb

== 1982 ==
Recipient	Area of Excellence
Alistair Cooke	Personal Award "for his contributions to broadcasting, both in the United States and in Great Britain"
Texaco, Inc., The Texaco Foundation, and Metropolitan Opera Association	Institutional Award for opera presentations on radio and TV
National Public Radio	The Sunday Show (John Bos, executive producer; Fred Bourque, producer; Rose Tobin and Laura Walker, directors)
National Public Radio	Taylor Made Piano: A Jazz History, hosted by Billy Taylor
Canadian Broadcasting Corporation	Morningside, for "1905"
WMAL/Washington, DC	"They Served With Honor," recollections of those who served in the Vietnam War (Larry Matthews, reporter)
NBC Radio News	Banks on the Brink, a Second Sunday report on the international banking crisis
Mutual Broadcasting System	Larry King Show
Radio Foundation	The Bob and Ray Public Radio Show
KOCO-TV/Oklahoma City, OK	"Oklahoma Shame," an investigation into abuses and deaths in homes for intellectually disabled residents run by the state's Department of Health Services
WCVB-TV/Boston, MA	Ground Zero: Victory Road
KYW-TV/Philadelphia, PA	Sweet Nothing, a documentary exploring "our society's excessive consumption of sugar"
BBC Television, Paramount Television, and Operation Prime Time	Smiley's People
WWL-TV/New Orleans, LA	The Search for Alexander, a documentary on a museum exhibition that included works from Vergina, citing the work of Phil Johnson and James Tolhurst
Warner-Amex Satellite Entertainment	Award for Nickelodeon and the network's programming for children
NBC, Margie-Lee Enterprises, and The Blue Marble Company, in association with ITC Productions, Inc.	Skeezer (an NBC Monday Movie directed by Peter H. Hunt)
NBC and Highgate Pictures	The Electric Grandmother
NBC News	The Man Who Shot the Pope: A Study in Terrorism (reported by Bill McLaughlin and Marvin Kalb)
ABC News	ABC News Closeup: Vietnam Requiem
CBS News	Juilliard and Beyond: A Life in Music (produced by Shareen Blair Brysac and narrated by Charles Kuralt)
CBS Entertainment and Cinetex International	The Wall, a television movie about the Warsaw Ghetto Uprising directed by Robert Markowitz
WQED-TV/Pittsburgh, PA	Firebird, a productionby the Dance Theatre of Harlem directed for television by Beverly Baroff
KQED-TV/San Francisco, CA	Current Affairs: The Case of Dashiell Hammett, a documentary on Dashiell Hammett directed by Stephen Talbot
KGMB-TV/Honolulu, HI and Lee Productions Inc.	Beyond the Great Wall: Journey to the End of China
WAGA-TV/Atlanta, GA	Paradise Saved? a documentary examining the effect of tourists on Cumberland Island National Seashore (produced by Don Smith and Forrest Sawyer)
WBBM-TV/Chicago, IL	"Killing Crime: A Police Cop-out," an investigation led by Pam Zekman into the erasure of Chicago crime reports in order to create a decrease in crime statistics
WTSP/St Petersburg, FL	"Prisoners of the Harvest," an investigation by Mark Feldstein into the kidnapping, enslavement, and abuse of migrant farm workers by a farm labor contractor
Daniel Wilson Productions and Taurus Films	Blood and Honor: Youth Under Hitler
Television Corporation of America	784 Days That Changed America: From Watergate to Resignation (produced by Robert Drew and narrated by Nancy Dickerson)

== 1983 ==
Recipient	Area of excellence
Don McGannon	Personal Award for his work at Westinghouse Broadcasting Corp.
CNN	Institutional Award for the network's "significant news and information programming", citing Crossfire and the work of Daniel Schorr and Sandi Freeman
The Grand Ole Opry and WSM/Nashville, TN	Institutional Award for the Opry's "important mark on both music and [through WSM] broadcasting in this country"
WCCO Radio/Minneapolis, MN	"Debbie Pielow: Waiting for a Heart That Never Came," a series of reports by Steve Murphy on a Minnesota woman's efforts to receive a heart transplant
WCCO-TV/Minneapolis, MN	"I-TEAM: Ambulances," a report documenting less‑than‑satisfactory performances by some Twin Cities ambulance services, with reporting by Don Shelby (parts 1, 2, 3, 4, 5, and 6)
South Carolina Educational Radio Network	Marian McPartland's Piano Jazz
WMAL/Washington, DC	The Jeffersonian World of Dumas Malone, an interview by Ed Meyer
KMOX/St. Louis, MO	Times Beach: Born 1925, Died 1983, a series examining of the effects of dioxin on the Missouri town, recognizing the work of the contributions of general manager Robert Hyland, news director John Angelides, producers David St. John and Kent Martin, and narrator Bob Hardy
Thomas Looker	New England Almanac: Portraits in Sound of New England Life and Landscape, produced at WFCR and distributed by NPR
WRAL-FM/Raleigh, NC	Victims
WNBC-TV/New York, NY	Asylum in the Streets, which examined the effects of de-institutionalization on mentally ill homeless, citing the reporting of Gabe Pressman
CBS News	The Plane That Fell From the Sky, a CBS Reports documentary recounting the near-crash of a TWA jet in April 1979 (Bill Kurtis, correspondent)
CBS News	60 Minutes, for the report "'Lenell Geter's in Jail," which examined a Texas man's conviction for armed robbery (citing the work of executive producer Don Hewitt, producer Suzanne St. Pierre, and correspondent Morley Safer)
CBS Entertainment and Smith-Hemion Productions	Romeo and Juliet on Ice, starring Dorothy Hamill, Brian Pockar, and Toller Cranston and directed by Robert Iscove.
CBS Entertainment and Mendelson-Melendez Productions	What Have We Learned, Charlie Brown?
Chrysalis-Yellen Productions and NBC	Prisoner Without a Name, Cell Without a Number
NBC and Motown Productions	Motown 25: Yesterday, Today, Forever
NBC and Edgar J. Scherick Associates	He Makes Me Feel Like Dancin'
WTTW-TV/Chicago, IL	The Merry Widow, a ballet adaptation of the operetta choreographed by Ruth Page, starring Peter Martins and Patricia McBride, and directed for television by Dick Carter
WTTW-TV/Chicago, IL and BBC	The Making of a Continent, narrated by Marty Robinson and produced by Ned Kelly (parts 1, 2 (reels 1 and 2), and 3)
WTBS-TV/Atlanta, GA	Portrait of America, including episodes on Puerto Rico and Florida
WGBH-TV/Boston, MA	Nova: The Miracle of Life
WGBH-TV/Boston, MA, Central Independent Television, and Antenne 2	Vietnam: A Television History
Sunbow Productions	The Great Space Coaster
ABC and Dick Clark Productions	The Woman Who Willed a Miracle
WBBM-TV/Chicago, IL	Studebaker: Less Than They Promised, a documentary profiling the automobile manufacturer and the effects of its business, decline, and closure, narrated by Walter Jacobson and directed by Scott Craig
WBRZ-TV/Baton Rouge, LA	Give Me That Bigtime Religion, a profile of Jimmy Swaggart by John Camp later aired on PBS's Frontline
KRON-TV/San Francisco, CA	Climate of Death, on the Salvadoran Civil War (Jonathan Dann, Craig Franklin, and Larry Lee, producer/writers)
KCTS/Seattle, WA	Diagnosis: AIDS, produced by Barry Mitzman and David Davis

== 1984 ==
Recipient	Area of Excellence
ABC	Heartsounds
ABC News	ABC News Closeup: To Save Our Schools, To Save Our Children, hosted by Marshall Frady
Roone Arledge	Personal Award for Arledge's leadership at ABC News and Sports and for his contributions to and influence on TV in general
Ted Koppel	Personal Award for Koppel's work on ABC News' Nightline
KNX/Los Angeles	Award for KNX's reports on "The Immigration Problem"
WAFX/Fort Wayne, IN	D-Day: 40 Years Later
Brigham Young University	Bradbury 13 (distributed by NPR)
WNYC/New York, NY	Small Things Considered
Protestant Radio and Television Center	The Protestant Hour
KDFW-TV/Dallas, TX	"A Call for Help," a series of reports revealing deficiencies in the handling of EMS emergency calls, featuring the reporting of Fred Mays and Clarice Tinsley
WMAQ-TV/Chicago, IL	"Political Parasites," a report by Dick Kay and his associates which revealed "deadwood" Illinois State Legislature committees and commissions, their purposes and costs
WDVM-TV/Washington, DC	Award for the station's investigation, reported by Mark Feldstein, into malpractice and unsafe abortions at a clinic run by Dr. Milan Vuitch
WCAX-TV/Burlington, VT	"Patterns of Practice," an investigation into varied efficiency levels of Vermont hospitals in regards to surgical procedures and patient stays
KGW-TV/Portland, OR	Award for reports on followers of Bhagwan Shree Rajneesh and how their settlement affected life in Central Oregon
WNET/New York, NY	Heritage: Civilization and the Jews (produced by John Fox and narrated by Abba Eban)
WNET/New York, NY	The Brain, produced by George Page
MacNeil/Lehrer NewsHour, WNET/New York, NY, WETA-TV/Washington, DC, and Gannett Productions	Award for NewsHour essays by Roger Rosenblatt
Corporation for Entertainment and Learning Inc., WNET/New York, NY, and KQED/San Francisco, CA	A Walk Through the 20th Century With Bill Moyers, hosted by Bill Moyers
WCCO-TV/Minneapolis, MN	The Hollow Victory: Vietnam Under Communism, a documentary that examined life in the South Asian nation, hosted by Dave Moore
WGBH-TV/Boston, MA	Award to Frontline "for its total contribution to the world of exceptional television"
CBS Entertainment and The David Gerber Company	George Washington
NBC and MTM Enterprises	St. Elsewhere
Central Independent Television	Seeds of Despair, a documentary directed by Charles Stewart revealing the drought and famine in Ethiopia
Turner Broadcasting System	Cousteau/Amazon
Granada Television	The Jewel in the Crown
KFGO/Fargo, ND	Award for the station's "extraordinary emergency coverage" of a February 4, 1984 blizzard
Showtime	Faerie Tale Theatre
WCVB-TV/Boston, MA	Somerville High, a report on Somerville High School by Natalie Jacobson
WFMT/Chicago, IL and Raymond Nordstrand	Institutional Award for WFMT's fine arts programming

== 1985 ==
Recipient	Area of Excellence
Bob Geldof and Live Aid	Personal Award for Geldof's efforts to aid famine victims in Ethiopia through the concert event
Johnny Carson	Personal Award for Carson's work on The Tonight Show
WBZ-TV/Boston, MA	Tender Places a short drama about divorce, starring Frederick Koehler and Jean Stapleton, written by the 13-year-old Jason Brown
KDKA-TV/Pittsburgh, PA	Second Chance, a documentary and follow-up public service campaign led by producer Jan Getz working in collaboration with other Group W stations and Presbyterian-University Hospital of Pittsburgh promoting organ donations and transplants
Lawrence Fraiberg	Personal Award to the head of Westinghouse Broadcasting's stations division for his "mandate to serve the public interest"
WBUR-FM/Boston, MA	Liberation Remembered, a documentary produced by Eileen Bolinsky and written by Anne McGrath about the liberation of Nazi concentration camps
WGBH-FM/Boston, MA	Institutional Award for WGBH's "overall programming and its leadership in state-of-the-art broadcasting", highlighting Morning Pro Musica (hosted by Robert J. Lurtsema), Music America (hosted by Ron Della Chiesa), Eric in the Evening (hosted by Eric Jackson), and Folk Heritage (hosted by Dick Pleasants)
WGBH-TV/Boston, MA and The Blackwell Corporation	Frontline, for "Crisis in Central America" (parts 1, 2, 3, and 4), a documentary about the Central American crisis produced by Judith Vecchione, Marilyn Mellowes, Martin Smith, and Huston Simmons
WHAS/Louisville, KY	Down and Outside: On the Streets of Louisville, a story on homelessness reported by Mike Edgerly and Ralph Dix
CBS News	The Number Man — Bach at Three Hundred, a radio documentary narrated by Charles Osgood
CBS News	Whose America Is It? (Bill Moyers, correspondent)
CBS Entertainment and Dave Bell Productions	Do You Remember Love
Marjorie Van Halteren	Breakdown and Back, a Van Halteren-produced radio series on mental illness
WCCO-TV/Minneapolis, MN	"I-Team" investigation into abuses and shortcomings in the home health care industry
MacNeil/Lehrer NewsHour	"Apartheid's People," a series by Charlayne Hunter-Gault examining daily life in South Africa
NBC	An Early Frost
NBC News	Vietnam Ten Years After, reported by Marvin Kalb, John Hart, Bryant Gumbel, and Garrick Utley
KGO-TV/San Francisco, CA	The American West: Steinbeck Country, produced by Bob Anderson with Rip Torn as Steinbeck
KDTV-TV/San Francisco, CA	Coverage of the Mexico City earthquake
Spinning Reels and HBO	Braingames
WSMV-TV/Nashville, TN	A Higher Standard, a documentary focusing on the relationship between Congressman Bill Boner and an influential defense contractor
TV Ontario	The Final Chapter?, a documentary made with NHK, Sveriges Television, and Technisonor about nuclear warfare and nuclear winter
Harvey Milk Project, Inc. and WNET/New York, NY	The Times of Harvey Milk
Columbia University Graduate School of Journalism, WQED-TV/Pittsburgh, PA, WNET/New York, NY, Bonneville Broadcast Group, and PBS	Seminars on Media and Society, produced by Betsy Miller and Cynthia McFadden
WBBM-TV/Chicago, IL	"Armed and Dangerous," an investigation exposing armed, unlicensed, and unqualified security guards working in the Chicago area
Central Independent Television and WETA-TV/Washington, DC	The Skin Horse, a documentary directed by Nigel Randell Evans and John Samson about sexuality and disability
Lincoln Center for the Performing Arts	Live from Lincoln Center

== 1986 ==
Recipient	Area of Excellence
Jim Henson and The Muppets	Personal Award for "thirty years of good, clean fun and outstanding entertainment"
Dorothy Stimson Bullitt	Personal Award to the founder of King Broadcasting Company
The Fine Arts Society of Indianapolis	Institutional Award for the Society's funding and production of classical music programming on WICR/Indianapolis, IN
NBC	The Cosby Show
NBC News	Award for on-the-scene radio reports by Fred Kennedy and Philip Till on the U.S. bombing raid of Tripoli, Libya
Canadian Broadcasting Corporation	Paris: From Oscar Wilde to Jim Morrison
Connecticut Public Radio	One On One (hosted by Faith Middleton)
CBS News	NEWSMARK: Where in the World Are We?
CBS News	Sunday Morning, for its presentation of Vladimir Horowitz's concert in Moscow
CBS News	CBS Reports: The Vanishing Family - Crisis in Black America
CBS Entertainment and Garner-Duchow Productions	Promise
WTMJ-TV/Milwaukee, WI	"Who's Behind the Wheel?" a report that revealed poor safety records among Milwaukee school bus drivers
WHAS/Louisville, KY	A Disaster Called Schizophrenia
WFAA/Dallas, TX	Award for reports uncovering the Southern Methodist University football scandal
KPIX-TV/San Francisco, CA	Award for KPIX's "AIDS Lifeline" project
MacNeil/Lehrer Productions and BBC	The Story of English
WQED-TV/Pittsburgh, PA	Anne of Green Gables
WQED-TV/Pittsburgh, PA and National Geographic Society	National Geographic Specials, for Chesapeake Borne (produced by David F. Oyster), Creatures of the Mangrove (produced by Phil Agland), Jerusalem: Within These Walls (produced by Miriam Birch) and Realm of The Alligator (produced by John Paling)
Churchill Films and ABC Television Entertainment	The Mouse and the Motorcycle
ABC News	This Week with David Brinkley
Thames Television International and D.L. Taffner, Ltd.	Unknown Chaplin (presented on American Masters)
John F. Kennedy Center for the Performing Arts	The 1986 Kennedy Center Honors: A Celebration of the Performing Arts
Thames Television and WGBH-TV/Boston, MA	Paradise Postponed (presented on Masterpiece Theatre)
WSB-TV/Atlanta, GA	The Boy King, a film about the young Martin Luther King Jr.
WCCO-TV and WCCO Radio/Minneapolis, MN	Project Lifesaver, an initiative to promote safe driving
WCVB-TV/Boston, MA	A World of Difference, an initiative to combat prejudice of all kinds using "specials, documentaries, news features, and public service announcements"

== 1987 ==
Recipient	Area of Excellence
WSMV/Nashville, TN	4 the Family, a series of family-themed specials and PSAs
CKVU-TV/Vancouver, BC	AIDS and You
HBO	America Undercover: Drunk and Deadly, a documentary by Robert Niemack about drunk driving
Center for New American Media	American Tongues
CNN	Coverage of the 1987 stock market crash
Mutual Broadcasting System	Charities That Give and Take
KQED-TV/San Francisco, CA in Association with El Teatro Campesino	Corridos! Tales of Passion and Revolution
WRC-TV/Washington, DC	"Deadly Mistakes," a report exposing inaccurate lab results of cancer patients
WCPO-TV/Cincinnati, OH	Investigation into questionable deaths at Drake Hospital
ABC Radio News	Earnest Will: Americans in the Gulf
Blackside, Inc.	Eyes on the Prize: America's Civil Rights Years
Hallmark Hall of Fame and CBS	Institutional Award for Hall of Fame, specifically citing Pack of Lies and Foxfire
WCVB-TV/Boston, MA	"Inside Bridgewater," an investigation into occurrences at a state hospital for the criminally insane
MacNeil/Lehrer NewsHour	Award for a series of reports on Japan's economy
Karl Haas	Personal Award for his work as a pianist and conductor and for work on Adventures in Good Music
Kevin Brownlow, and David Gill	Personal Awards for their work in the preservation of silent films
KPAL Radio/Little Rock, AR	Organizational Award for its overall programming for children
NBC	L.A. Law
NBC and Louis Rudolph Films	LBJ: The Early Years
HBO	Mandela
WNET/New York City	Nature, for the episode "A Season in the Sun", directed by Alan Root and Joan Root
WNET/New York City	Shoah
WGBH-TV/Boston, MA and KCET-TV/Los Angeles	NOVA, for the episode "Spy Machines", produced by Lew Allison
WSM/Nashville, TN	Of Violence and Victims, an investigation into the increase in Nashville's crime rate
National Public Radio	A Weekend Edition profile of Ryan Martin, a 13-year-old boy adapting to his paralysis, the result of a shooting incident
WXXI-TV/Rochester, NY	Safe Haven, a documentary produced by Paul Lewis about the Fort Ontario Emergency Refugee Shelter
Long Bow Group Inc., New York, New York	Small Happiness: Women of a Chinese Village
KNBC/Los Angeles	Some Place Like Home, a profile by Laurel Erickson of Providence House, an AIDS hospice in the Los Angeles area
Paramount Pictures Corporation	Star Trek: The Next Generation, for the episode "The Big Goodbye"

== 1988 ==
Recipient	Area of Excellence
WTTW-TV/Chicago in association with Chloe Productions, Inc.	...and the Pursuit of Happiness
Children's Television Workshop	3-2-1 Contact Extra: I Have AIDS, A Teenager's Story
CBS News	48 Hours, for the reports "Abortion Battle" (reported by Richard Schlesinger, Erin Moriarty, Bernard Goldberg, and Victoria Corderi and produced by Al Briganti) and "On Runaway Street" (reported by Harold Dow and produced by Catherine Lasiewicz)
CBS News	60 Minutes, for the report "Mr. Snow Goes to Washington," which highlighted a campaign on the dangers of lawn darts (Diane Sawyer, correspondent; Chris Whipple, producer)
WHAS/Louisville	A Matter of Time: The Crisis in Kentucky Corrections
Public Affairs Television Inc.	Bill Moyers' World of Ideas, hosted by Bill Moyers
WPLG-TV/Miami, FL	"Caution: Precious Cargo," a report that highlighted low levels of school bus safety, including bus lines that operated unlicensed
South Carolina Educational Television and The Mosaic Group, Inc.	Children's Express NEWSMAGAZINE: Campaign '88
National Public Radio	Cowboys on Everest
HBO	Dear America: Letters Home from Vietnam
Don Hewitt	Personal Award for his work at CBS News
The MacNeil/Lehrer NewsHour (WNET/New York & WETA-TV/Washington)	Coverage of the 1988 election campaign
Frontline and Time Inc.	Frontline: The Choice
KMOX/St. Louis	Hate Crimes: America's Cancer
Christian Science Monitor Reports	Islam in Turmoil
Jim McKay	Personal Award for his work at ABC Sports
KCBS-TV/Los Angeles	"MCA and the Mob," a series of reports revealing organized crime connections to the media conglomerate
BBC World Service for Africa	Nothing Political/Mandela at 70
WBUR-FM/Boston, MA	Speaking for Everyman: Ian McKellen Celebrates Shakespeare's Birthday
HBO and Pro Image Productions/Sydney, Australia	Suzi's Story
CBS Entertainment and Telecom Entertainment, in association with Yorkshire Television	The Attic: The Hiding of Anne Frank
WBRZ-TV/Baton Rouge, LA	"The Best Insurance Commissioner Money Can Buy," an investigation of alleged improprieties on the part of the Insurance Commissioner of the State of Louisiana
KTAR/Phoenix	Coverage of the impeachment of Arizona governor Evan Mecham (produced by Bob Christopher, Dennis Lambert and Diane Bonilla)
TNT	The Making of a Legend: Gone with the Wind
NBC	The Murder of Mary Phagan
WJLA-TV/Washington, D.C.	"The Radon Watch Campaign," a series of reports and PSAs
BBC and WNET/New York	The Singing Detective
ABC and The Bedford Falls Company in association with MGM/UA Television	thirtysomething
Ambassador Walter Annenberg	Personal Award for his work in public broadcasting, including the Corporation for Public Broadcasting/Annenberg Project's funding of programs such as The Brain, The Constitution: That Delicate Balance, and Planet Earth

== 1989 ==
Recipient	Area of Excellence
David Brinkley	Personal Award for Brinkley's "lifetime of service to the American people" at NBC News and ABC News
J. Leonard Reinsch	Personal Award for Reinsch's work at COX Communications and in political communication
KCBS/San Francisco, CA	Separate awards for the stations' coverage of the Loma Prieta earthquake and its aftermath
KGO-TV/San Francisco, CA	Separate awards for the stations' coverage of the Loma Prieta earthquake and its aftermath
KRON-TV/San Francisco, CA	I Want to Go Home, an account of the plight of homeless children in the San Francisco area (highlighting the work of Herb Dudnick and Jonathan Dann)
D. Roberts	Award to the independent producer for "Mei Mei: A Daughter's Song," which aired on American Public Radio's Soundprint and told of the personal and cultural boundaries between a Taiwanese mother and her American daughter
WCSC-TV/Charleston, SC	Award for the station's coverage of the aftermath of Hurricane Hugo
MTV Networks	Decade, a review of the 1980s led by Linda Corradina that "looked and sounded like no other retrospective"
KING-TV/Seattle, WA	Project Home Team, a series of reports and programs spotlighting the plight of the working poor
CBS and Motown-Pangaea Productions in association with Qintex Entertainment	Lonesome Dove
KCNC-TV/Denver, CO	Yellowstone: Four Seasons After Fire, produced by John Cummings and Vicki Hildner
Texaco	Metropolitan Opera radio broadcasts
ABC and Black/Marlens Company in association with New World Television	The Wonder Years
ABC and Sacret Inc. in association with Warner Bros. Television	China Beach, for the episode "Vets"
ABC, Lou Rudolph Films, Motown Productions, Allarcom Ltd., and Fries Entertainment	Small Sacrifices
Alvin H. Perlmutter, Inc. and Public Affairs Television, Inc.	The Public Mind
CBS Radio News	Separate awards for the networks' coverage of the protests in Beijing's Tiananmen Square and related background and perspective reportage
CNN	Separate awards for the networks' coverage of the protests in Beijing's Tiananmen Square and related background and perspective reportage
NBC News	To Be an American, a special on immigration by Tom Brokaw
Central Independent Television	Cambodia Year Ten, directed by David Munro and written by John Pilger
Beyond International Group	The Great Wall of Iron, a documentary series on the People’s Liberation Army produced by Steve Amezdroz and Harold Weldon and directed by Scott Hicks (aired on the Discovery Channel)
HBO	Common Threads: Stories from the Quilt
Children's Television Workshop	Sesame Street (winning the award for the second time, a rare feat)
Film News Now and WTVS/Detroit, MI in association with P.O.V.	Who Killed Vincent Chin?
National Public Radio	Award for Scott Simon's essays on Weekend Edition
Canadian Broadcasting Corporation	Lost Innocence: The Children of World War II
WLOX-TV/Biloxi, MS	"Did They Die in Vain?" which explored the lingering effects of the 1964 murders of Chaney, Goodman, and Schwerner in Neshoba County, Mississippi 25 years after the tragedy

== See also ==
- Academy Award for Best Documentary Feature
- Alfred I. duPont-Columbia University Award
