= Dan Barreiro =

American sportswriter

- Born: January 21, 1955 (age 71); Gary, Indiana
- Education: Elk Grove High School
- Alma mater: Indiana University
- Occupation: sports radio talk-show host on KFAN 100.3-FM
- Spouse: Catherine Barreiro
- Children: Giovanna

Dan Barreiro is a sports radio talk-show host on KFAN 100.3-FM in the twin cities of Minneapolis-St. Paul. Born in Gary, Indiana, Barreiro was a sports columnist at the Star Tribune for 17 years after previously working for the Dallas Morning News . Barreiro left the Star Tribune in March 2004.

== Bumper to Bumper ==
Dan is known as "The Big Ticket" on KFAN due to his high ratings. He is also known as "Hi-Fi" because he spends a large amount of his disposable income on stereo equipment. Producer of the show is Minnesota Golden Gophers football sideline reporter and Edina High School tennis star Justin Gaard. Barreiro began his career at KFAN in 1992 partnered on-air with Chad Hartman, who is the son of longtime Star Tribune columnist Sid Hartman. The duo was selected as the "Best Sports Talk Radio Hosts" in 2000 by local weekly City Pages. In 2001, the pair broke up, with Hartman hosting the show leading into Barreiro's. Hartman was let go due to Clear Channel budget cuts in 2009. On his own, Barreiro earned the title "Best Sports Talk Radio Host" from City Pages in 2005 and 2006.

In 2005, Barreiro also began airing a show called Sunday Sermons that airs Sunday mornings. Justin Gaard also does a Sunday show called "Cake Show".

Barreiro is known to work politics into his show and is known for his rants.

On November 8, 2007, rumors were surfacing in local Twin Cities newspapers regarding a potential move down the dial for Barreiro to AM 1500 KSTP. However, Barreiro had been in contract talks with Clear Channel regarding a long term extension at KFAN, and he did acknowledge the situation by stating "We're letting the process play out, I'll just leave it at that." Barrerio's offer from KSTP was finally matched by Clear Channel on November 28, and Dan decided to stay with KFAN for the long term.

The Sunday Sermons program ended April 6, 2008; the following Saturday, April 12, Barreiro began a new two-hour Saturday morning show (10 a.m. to noon) on KTLK-FM 100.3. Barreiro's new show is "almost exclusively non-sports," and is similar to the past Sunday morning show. Barreiro remains on KFAN weekday afternoons.

After a brief run on KLTK Barreiro returned to Sunday Sermons in 2010. He is no longer on KLTK unless it is as a fill-in for one of their regulars.

Barreiro was inducted into the Minnesota Broadcasting Hall of Fame on September 17, 2022.

== More on Carl Gerbschmidt ==
Carl Gerbschmidt is a diehard Green Bay Packers fan who lives in Elk Mound, Wisconsin. He is notable for often guesting on the Bumper to Bumper show with Dan Barreiro which airs on Minnesota's KFAN 100.3 FM radio station. He normally discusses professional football on the show, especially the Packers and the Minnesota Vikings. Gerbschmidt started a blog which can be read on Barreiro's page on KFAN's website, but it has not been updated since 2010. An Eau Claire newspaper contained an article with Gerbschmidt as its featured subject and questioned his very existence. Gerbschmidt once drove to the 2016 Minnesota State Fair in his RV to prove his existence, but after not being able to find a parking spot for his large RV he decided to turn around and go home.

He was introduced on KFAN in August 2001 under the guise that a tornado had blown over his property and left the remains of a damaged building situated in a manner that looked like the goal line formation of the famous 1967 Ice Bowl. Gerbschmidt was reportedly born as quarterback Bart Starr crossed the goal line.

According to him, he used to run an Ice Bowl exhibit and a Packers wax museum at his house in Elk Mound. He is one of the owners (along with his brothers Mark, Vern and Randy) of the Wisconsin Interactive Ice Bowl Exhibit Dinner Theatre. Gerbschmidt is married to Mrs. Gerbschmidt, who works in biophysics, and the couple has a daughter who played strong safety and punter. Gerbschmidt's hobbies include drinking beer, clog dancing, Kool & the Gang memorabilia, and Star Trek. Gerbschmidt moved to the Milwaukee suburb of Oconomowoc where he worked for the Wisconsin Department of Transportation. Gerbschmidt lived in West Baraboo until 2012, but moved home to Elk Mound when he was promoted to Supervisor.

He once purchased Brett Favre's truck on EBay, and possibly out-bid himself while doing so. However, after Favre signed with the Vikings on August 18, 2009, Gerbschmidt claimed that he lit the truck on fire. This was part of a memorable rant with Barreiro on the day Favre signed with the Vikings in which Barreiro allegedly called Gerbschmidt, who was at a bar in Chippewa Falls with his brother Randy after leaving work early the morning that the Favre news broke. Admittedly drunk, Gerbschmidt spent nearly 10 minutes whining, and at times crying, over Favre's supposed betrayal; Gerbschmidt later defended his emotional outburst by claiming he was upset "for the children of Wisconsin who worshiped him", and threatening that Favre "best watch himself" if he ever came back to Wisconsin.

Although many say Gerbschmidt is a fictional character, Barreiro has never admitted he is fictional. Through the years, he has never made a public appearance. Barreiro has mentioned on his show that he has frequently heard from listeners who believe ESPN football analyst Kevin Seifert, a frequent guest on the show, provides the voice of Gerbschmidt. Barreiro and Seifert attempted to put that rumor to rest by having Seiftert in studio talking to Gerbschmidt while he called in on the phone. According to Paul Lambert (Meatsauce), Carl Gerbschmidt is voiced by Chad Abbott, but Lambert has named over nine members of the KFAN staff as possible candidates for Carl's voice.
