= Prime Sports Upper Midwest =

Former American regional sports network in Minnesota

- Country: United States
- Broadcast area: Iowa; Minnesota; North Dakota; South Dakota; Wisconsin
- Network: Prime Network
- Headquarters: St. Paul, Minnesota

Programming
- Language: English

Ownership
- Owner: Hubbard Broadcasting (61.4%); Liberty Media (38.6%)

History
- Launched: 1990
- Closed: December 31, 1995

Prime Sports Upper Midwest was an American regional sports network owned by Hubbard Broadcasting and Liberty Media, which operated as an affiliate of the Prime Network. Headquartered in Minneapolis, Minnesota, the channel broadcast regional coverage of sports events throughout the Upper Midwest region. Prime Sports Upper Midwest was available on cable providers throughout Iowa, Minnesota, North Dakota, South Dakota and Wisconsin.

== History ==
Prime Sports Upper Midwest launched in 1990, receiving its affiliation with the Prime Network through Liberty's partial ownership interest. The centerpiece of the network's sports coverage was the rights to the games of the NBA's Minnesota Timberwolves and Milwaukee Bucks, along with a number of college sports events and outdoors programs.

The network struggled only having one team's sports rights against the more established Midwest Sports Channel, which had the rights to Minnesota Twins baseball, and the backing of Midwest Radio and Television, the owners of the dominant WCCO stations. MSC's strength in the Twin Cities became more dominant in 1992 after CBS Corporation purchased Midwest Radio and Television, along with the Twins' win in the 1991 World Series, while PSUM was stunted by the terminal mediocrity of the Timberwolves in the 90s, along with other challenges to Hubbard's longevity in the Twin Cities market, namely Gannett NBC affiliate KARE permanently unseating Hubbard's KSTP-TV as the market's spirited competitor to WCCO, and KMSP-TV beginning its slow rise in viewership and news and sports strength.

In the spring of 1995, MSC signed an agreement with the Timberwolves to acquire the exclusive regional cable television rights to the team's games beginning with the 1995–96 season. As a result, on October 5, 1995, Hubbard and Liberty Media announced that Prime Sports Upper Midwest would be shut down. The announcement came three weeks before News Corporation acquired a 50% ownership interest in the Prime Sports networks on October 31, with the intent to partner with Liberty to have the Prime Sports networks to serve as the cornerstones for a new group of regional sports networks – developed as a cable venture for Fox Sports – which would also offer national programming distributed to the Prime-affiliated RSNs not owned by Liberty. Prime Sports Upper Midwest ceased operations on December 31, 1995. Fox Sports would then purchase MSC in 1999 from Viacom as it spun off extraneous assets from its first merger with CBS, relaunching it as Fox Sports North in 2001.
