= Andy Dehnart =

American journalist and television critic (born 1977)

Andy Dehnart (born August 26, 1977) is an American journalist and television critic. He may be best known as reality television's "longest-standing critic" for his online journalism, as he is the creator of the genre's first tracking website, realityblurred.com. He is a member of the Television Critics Association.

Currently a contributor of television criticism and cultural journalism to NPR, The Daily Beast and msnbc.com, Dehnart has also written for Salon.com, Wired.com, The Boston Globe, Metro, the Chicago Tribune and Playboy. He regularly appears on television and the radio to discuss reality TV and popular culture.

USA Today named Dehnart one of the Top 100 People in Pop Culture in 2001.

Dehnart earned an MFA in nonfiction writing from Bennington College, where his non-fiction studies included a lecture which explored the cultural impact of blogging, then a relatively unknown phenomenon in popular culture.

Dehnart now teaches writing, journalism, and communication studies at Stetson University in DeLand, Florida, where he advises the student newspaper. He has also taught for Johns Hopkins University's Center for Talented Youth.

Earlier, Dehnart moved to Chicago in 1999 to work as managing editor of a non-profit website, and later he worked as a producer for thepavement.com, a site for recent college graduates, and BrassRing, a recruiting solutions company. A native of Naples, Florida, Dehnart received his BS from Stetson, where he majored in journalism and earned minors in political science and religious studies. While an undergraduate, he edited the weekly campus newspaper, The Reporter, for two years; both years, it was named the best private college newspaper in the state of Florida.

Dehnart is openly gay.

== Reality Blurred ==
Reality Blurred
- Website type: Blog
- Available in: English
- Owner: Reality Blurred LLC
- Creator: Andy Dehnart
- Website: www.realityblurred.com
- Advertising: Yes
- Commercial: Yes
- Launched: 2000; 26 years ago

Reality Blurred is an American entertainment news website Dehnart created in July 2000, and the daily-updated site quickly became a primary source for devotees of the reality TV explosion. It was the first website to cover reality television.

It tracks reality TV shows and includes reporting, analysis, commentary, interviews, and show reviews.

=== History ===
Reality Blurred launched July 2000 as an entertainment blog modeled after Jim Romenesko's MediaNews but focused on early reality television shows such as Survivor and Making the Band. Media coverage of the website said it "analyzes the reality TV genre" and "tracks daily press coverage of all the currently running unscripted TV series."

In 2010, the website published the Survivor contract and rule book.

Reality Blurred was first to report news such as CBS's plans for a season of Big Brother on CBS All Access, which became Big Brother: Over the Top., and Netflix casting journalist Alex Wagner to host The Mole.

Dehnart still writes for the website. Other contributors to Reality Blurred have included Stephen Fishbach, The Challenge: Spies, Lies & Allies contestant Corey Lay and Jane McGonigal.

=== Reception ===
Two months after its launch, Entertainment Weekly graded Reality Blurred an "A," calling the website "a Virgil to guide you through television’s latest ring of hell" and a "smartly dressed compendium of so-real-it’s-real links." Slate named Reality Blurred the best culture blog about television in 2003.

Reality Blurred won the 2021 Los Angeles Press Club’s award for Entertainment Blog by an Individual Not Tied to an Organization in the National Arts and Entertainment Journalism Awards.
