= Bill Carlson =

American journalist (1934–2008)

Bill Carlson (November 26, 1934 – February 29, 2008), born William Meyer Carlson, was an American journalist and longtime television anchor at WCCO in Minneapolis, Minnesota. Carlson was born in Thief River Falls, Minnesota and grew up in St. Paul, Minnesota. Carlson died of prostate cancer at the age of 73 on February 29, 2008.

== Career ==
He began his career with WCCO Television in 1951, while still in high school, working as a page. After completing military service, he returned to the station in 1959, working in front of the camera in a variety of capacities. Carlson's extraordinary good looks, winning personality and Scandinavian manner made him popular with viewers. In the 1960s, he began reviewing films, and was widely respected among colleagues and people in the movie industry alike.

Carlson married fellow WCCO personality and former Miss Minnesota USA Nancy Nelson in 1970.

Carlson has one daughter, Susan, born in 1965.

Carlson was best known as the anchor of the weekday noon news on WCCO, a post he held for over four decades. Despite competent and professional execution of his duties, he was removed from the position briefly in 2003 due to his age. A protest campaign spearheaded by his wife and overwhelming viewer response resulted in his return a few months later.

Carlson was a fixture at the Minnesota State Fair, having attended over 60 consecutive fairs during his lifetime. He was also known for his compassion and work with animals, including the Humane Society of Minnesota and the University of Minnesota's Raptor Center, where for years he served on the Board of Directors

== Personal life ==
Susan- daughter and only child, Sarah- oldest granddaughter, Megan- youngest granddaughter
