= WCCO II =

Local cable channel

- Country: United States
- Broadcast area: Minneapolis–Saint Paul
- Headquarters: Minneapolis, Minnesota

Programming
- Language(s): English

Ownership
- Owner: Midwest Communications
- Sister channels: WCCO-TV

History
- Launched: 1982
- Closed: March 1, 1989
- Replaced by: Midwest Sports Channel

WCCO II was an early local cable channel serving the Minneapolis area. The channel was owned by Midwest Communications and meant to complement programming on broadcast station WCCO-TV.

== History ==
The network, launched by Midwest Radio and Television (later Midwest Communications) in 1982 was described as an "experimental cable channel", originally filled much of its schedule with rebroadcasts of WCCO's newscasts and ESPN's SportsCenter, as well as programming from the Financial News Network. A second cable channel called WCCO Cable Weather Channel was also launched at the same time, initially providing automated weather forecasts 24 hours a day before transitioning into providing live weather forecasts in early 1983. In 1985, an agreement was made to fill most of WCCO II's schedule with music videos produced by K-TWIN. A few hours were reserved for rebroadcasts of newscasts and other programming.

On March 1, 1989, WCCO II was relaunched as the Midwest Sports Channel when it acquired rights to Twins broadcasts. CBS acquired Midwest in 1992, then sold MSC (by 1997 also featuring a Milwaukee sub-feed, now Fox Sports Wisconsin) to News Corporation in 2000, and it became Fox Sports North and later Bally Sports North. It is now branded as FanDuel Sports Network North.
