= Joe Soucheray =

American journalist and podcaster (born 1949)

- Born: Joseph Henry Soucheray; January 7, 1949 (age 77); St. Paul, Minnesota, U.S.
- Occupations: Columnist and podcast host
- Spouse: Jennifer Soucheray
- Children: 3

Joseph Henry Soucheray (born January 7, 1949) is a radio talk-show host and newspaper columnist. He produces his podcast Garage Logic from studios in Saint Paul, Minnesota.

== Early life ==
Soucheray was born in Saint Paul, Minnesota in 1949. He attended St. Luke's as a grade schooler, Hill High School (now Hill-Murray School), and graduated from the college at University of St. Thomas in 1971.

== Newspaper career ==
Soucheray entered the media as a sports journalist, beginning work as a sports reporter for the Minneapolis Tribune in 1973. He joined the Saint Paul Pioneer Press in 1984 as a local columnist. He is the author of 10 books.

- Sheila Young
- Fred Lynn
- How to repair your 10-speed bike (A Creative games, projects, and activities book)
- Bruce Jenner - published 1979
- Walter Payton - published 1980
- Sooch!: Sports writing of Joe Soucheray of the Minneapolis tribune published 1981
- Once there was a ballpark: The season of the Met, 1956-1981 published 1981
- Waterline: Of Fathers, Sons... Waterline: Of Fathers, Sons, and Boats (Nonpareil Book) - published 1989
- Modern, Caring, Sensitive Male: A Curmudgeon Columnist Looks at Life - 1994
- Garage Logic: A Companion Guide to Life in the Radio Town published 2010

== Early radio career ==
In 1980, Soucheray entered the radio business, co-hosting Monday Night Sports Talk on KSTP radio with then-St. Paul Pioneer Press sports columnist Patrick Reusse.

The show was known for its cast of callers doing impressions of various celebrities, in and out of the sports world, of widely varying quality - and, very occasionally, discussion about sports.

The lack of actual sports content on "MNST" was a running gag between Soucheray, Reusse and the audience.

The show aired until the early nineties, until Soucheray began his daily "Garage Logic" program. The "Sports Talk" brand lived on in the duo's weekend show, "Saturday Morning Sports Talk" and has continued with the weekday version of "Sports Talk" which began airing on Monday, February 15, 2010. The pair claim it is the "longest-running sports talk show in history."

== Garage Logic ==
Soucheray began hosting his daily talk show on KSTP on April 29, 1993 from 2-4 pm. After a slow start, Soucheray copied the success of Minnesota Public Radio host Garrison Keillor and created a counterpart to Keillor’s Lake Wobegon called “Garage Logic.”

On the show, Soucheray acts as the mayor of a mythical town bearing the same name as the radio show: Garage Logic, county seat of Gumption County. The motivating idea is to promote traditional values and is a sort of criticism of modern American pop culture and Minnesota's dominant liberal culture. Soucheray prefers to stick with the less philosophical slogan "Anything that needs to be figured out can be figured out in the garage."

Much of Soucheray’s success was due to his paring on the air with producer Matt "The Rookie" Michalski since the late 1990s. Rookie voiced behind many skits and imitations on "Garage Logic" and "Saturday Morning Sports Talk” during their creative years.

After twenty-five years on the air, KSTP officially canceled Garage Logic as a radio show with the final radio broadcast airing on September 7, 2018.

“I knew the end of radio was coming. The ratings systems are terribly unkind to talk radio. I knew we had more listeners than they said. I’d be in Germany and random people would come up to me and say, ‘Hail, flashlight king’… Podcasting has corroborated those instincts.”

Garage Logic relaunched as a podcast three days later. On November 4th 2024, Garage Logic returned to its daily live broadcasting roots by broadcasting everyday on YouTube. The podcast is also financed by Hubbard Broadcasting, the owners of KSTP-AM.
