= Midwest Communications (1952–1992) =

U.S. broadcasting company

Midwest Communications, Inc. was a broadcasting company based in the Upper Midwest United States.

== History ==
The company's history dates back to August 1952, when it was formed as Midwest Radio and Television as a merger of WCCO (AM) and WTCN-TV. The company was a joint-venture of Mid-Continent Radio-Television (itself a partnership of the Saint Paul Pioneer Press and the Minneapolis Tribune Company, 53%) and CBS (47%). While WTCN radio went to a separate owner, the television station became WCCO-TV.

The company expanded over the years, launching WCCO-FM (now KMNB) in the 1970s.

In the early 1980s, Midwest Radio and Television bought ABC affiliate WFRV-TV in Green Bay and its satellite in Escanaba, Michigan, WJMN-TV (CBS did not initially take an ownership stake in either of those two stations at the time as they had good relations with then-CBS affiliate WBAY-TV) from Orion Broadcasting, which merged with Cosmos Broadcasting (itself a subsidiary of Liberty Corporation). Midwest Radio and Television also bought KCMT in Alexandria, Minnesota and its satellite in Walker, Minnesota, KNMT. The stations' calls became KCCO and KCCW respectively, and the stations became satellites of WCCO-TV.

In October 1982, the company renamed itself Midwest Communications to reflect the company's expanded business that now included cable systems and two cable channels. WCCO II was also launched around this time to become an early local cable channel that would evolve into the regional sports network Midwest Sports Channel.

In February 1992, the company merged with CBS, and WFRV/WJMN as well as WCCO became CBS owned-and-operated stations. Today, only WCCO-TV and its satellites are retained by Paramount Skydance Corporation. WFRV/WJMN was sold to Liberty Media in 2007, then to Nexstar Broadcasting Group in 2011. Meanwhile, CBS divested its entire radio division to Entercom, which renamed itself Audacy, Inc.

Midwest also owned the Midwest Sports Channel, which was originally associated with WCCO-TV. MSC became a CBS owned and operated network following its acquisition of WCCO. In 1999, shortly after CBS was acquired by Viacom, MSC was sold to News Corporation and operated as Fox Sports North (now FanDuel Sports Network North).

Midwest Radio and Television was not associated with Midwest Television, which was run by the estate of August C. Meyer Sr. and former owners of KFMB radio and television in San Diego, California, WCIA in Champaign and WMBD radio and television in Peoria, Illinois, nor Midwest Communications, which also has broadcasting interests in Northern Wisconsin, Minnesota, Michigan, Indiana, North Dakota and Tennessee.
