= Dave Moore (newscaster) =

Minnesota anchorman and journalist (1924–1998)

David Dalrymple Moore (June 4, 1924 – January 28, 1998) was a popular Minnesota television personality and beloved figure in the area from the 1950s through the time of his death. Moore hosted the evening news on WCCO channel 4 from 1957 until he retired to a more leisurely schedule in 1991. When recounting Moore's life story, journalists never neglect to include the fact that he was only offered the anchor post after Walter Cronkite turned it down. Like Cronkite, Moore reported the news like an everyday man off the street—which he contended that he was. The string of good fortune that led to Moore becoming influential was sometimes a source of guilt for him. His humble nature and commitment to hard journalism is considered a major contributor to the high quality of Twin Cities newscasts through the 1990s.

== Early life and career ==
Dave Moore was born on June 4, 1924 in Minneapolis to Morris Moore Jr. and Doris Dalrymple Moore. He briefly left the area to work at a Battle Creek, Michigan radio station in 1949 but returned to Minneapolis when he learned of job openings at WTCN-TV Channel 4 in 1950. Within an hour of walking into the station, he was working. In 1952, WCCO TV was purchased by WCCO Radio and became WCCO-TV, with the WTCN-TV call sign being recycled a few years later for Channel 11, which eventually became KARE. Moore had a variety of jobs in the early years of channel 4, announcing and hosting for multiple programs. He began anchoring the news at 10 p.m. in 1957, then anchored the station's 6 p.m. newscast in 1968. In the mid-70's, Moore hosted a news magazine show on WCCO TV called "Moore on Sunday", which he hosted until he fell ill in 1997.

Moore, with other station personalities, had a penchant for comedy. In 1962 he began The Bedtime Nooz, originally the Midnite News, a satirical late Saturday night news show that also featured weatherman Bud Kraehling and others from the station. This lasted for about a decade, a period during which Moore appeared onstage and received acting training at the University of Minnesota. Moore had wanted to become a stage actor, so The Bedtime Nooz and other shows he appeared in offered outlets for his creativity. A most revered stage performance occurred at Park Square Theatre in St. Paul, MN, in 1992. Dave starred in a production of "On Borrowed Time," by Paul Osborne. Playing "Gramps," the production was unique as it was directed by Moore's son, Peter. The production was considered so successful, that the company revived the show in 1993, due in no small part that the show's co-star, child actor Kirk Hall, Jr., was going to "out-grow" the part of "Pud," the grandson of Gramps.

WCCO is considered by many to have originated the "happy talk" often used to attract viewers in modern local newscasts, at least among stations in the Twin Cities. It has been said that Moore's happy talk was merely a result of the camaraderie among the cast rather than a contrived plan, although his acting ability could have fooled people easily. Beyond that, however, Moore actually resisted many changes over the years to increase viewership. He was not fond of crime reporting, and didn't like using those stories as lead-ins for the news. Also, while Moore was a strong supporter of women's rights, he didn't like being placed beside a female co-anchor in the 1970s. Moore felt that having two people read the news distracted from the stories being told. His first co-anchor was Susan Spencer, replaced a few years later by Pat Miles.

Moore was a heavy smoker, which contributed to his voice growing raspier over the years. Even as he aged and sported graying hair, he continued to be a popular figure. He remained busy, hosting the 5 p.m., 6 p.m., and 10 p.m. newscasts and producing periodic hour-long documentaries under the name The Moore Report, for which the station won many prestigious accolades. 1984's "Hollow Victory: Vietnam Under Communism" won a George Foster Peabody Award. The documentary was made after the station spent a year and a half negotiating a 35-day visa to visit the country.

The anchorman's humble nature meant that he did not push for high salaries. While reporters in significant markets around the country negotiated more and more expensive contracts, Moore and other newscasters in the Twin Cities were modestly paid. In 1985, Moore stepped down from the 10 p.m. newscast, eventually retiring from the evening news in 1991.

In 1986, Moore published his memoirs and correspondence with viewers throughout his career, titled A Member of the Family (ISBN 0-9617-4230-5).

Two of Moore's sons, Andy and Pete Moore, began working on a play to remember their father's life. They struggled to structure the play, eventually deciding to base it on their own stories and recollections rather than creating a dramatic piece with an actor portraying Dave. Called Sons of the Bedtime Nooz, it was performed at the Great American History Theatre in Saint Paul in early 2005.

== See also ==
- Don Shelby

== Additional resources ==
- The Dave Moore Papers are available for research use at the Minnesota Historical Society.
