= Jim Romenesko =

American journalist in Evanston, Illinois

Jim Romenesko (born September 16, 1953) is a retired American journalist in Evanston, Illinois. His eponymous blog provided daily news, commentary, and insider information about journalism and media. Romenesko also ran the blog Starbucks Gossip, which covered the Starbucks company. He previously ran the blog Romenesko on the website of the non-profit journalism school the Poynter Institute.

== Career ==
Romenesko graduated from Marquette University and went to work for the Milwaukee Journal, serving as a police reporter for the newspaper. Initially repulsed by the sometimes grisly nature of his work, he went on to publish the coroner's reports of unusual deaths in a book called Death Log (1981). From 1982 to 1995 he worked as an editor for Milwaukee Magazine, where he wrote features and an award-winning column that covered the local media called "Pressroom Confidential". During this time he also taught journalism at the University of Wisconsin-Milwaukee. He worked as an Internet reporter for the St. Paul Pioneer Press from 1996 to 1999.

From 1989 to 1999, Romenesko ran a newsletter named Obscure Publications which covered fanzines. In 1998 he began the website Obscure Store and Reading Room, which linked to odd news stories, and which earned him the reputation of a "witty Matt Drudge." Obscure Store was terminated in September 2011. In May 1999 he began another website, this one covering the media and called Mediagossip.com. It proved a success and later that year was acquired by the Poynter Institute. The site, renamed to Romenesko's MediaNews, was migrated to Poynter's domain, where it was targeted at journalists, helping Poynter get more than 14,000 page views a day in 2000. Romenesko's site was reputedly "the best-known newspaper blog" of the time. Romenesko has also been mentioned as a predecessor to Gawker for having "opened the first and biggest hole in the sacred wall between news and gossip in reporting about the media."

On August 24, 2011, Romenesko announced his "semi-retirement" from the Poynter Institute, in preparation to launch JimRomenesko.com, a blog about media and other items of interest to Romenesko. Romenesko planned to continue with Poynter in a part-time capacity, while expanding the role of other staff members of the Poynter Institute to post items related to media. He ended updates to JimRomenesko.com in 2016.

In 2015, Romenesko announced his retirement from his blog. He said he would no longer accept offers for sponsored post or job advertisements. His website is no longer online.

== Controversy ==
In November 2011, an assistant editor for the Columbia Journalism Review noted that posts summarizing articles on the Romenesko page at the Poynter Institute's web site repeated, verbatim, text in the articles without the use of quotation marks or indentation. In the process of reporting, the online chief of the Poynter Institute, Julie Moos, was contacted and noted that this behavior had occurred since 2005. Although Romenesko had always attributed the source of the information, Moos said the inconsistency of placing quotation marks or blockquoting text could cause the impression that text not in quotation marks was those of Romenesko, and not lifted directly from the text. Moos placed Romensko's blog on hold while the issue was being investigated, and following investigation ordered that all of Romenesko's posts be approved by an editor prior to post and to follow the Poynter Institute's attribution guidelines of placing quotation marks with any text used in the original article. Moos refused to accept his resignation.

Following Moos's comments, some writers and fans complained that the Poynter Institute was "micromanaging" Romenesko and expressed disdain for Moos's actions, noting Romenesko's role in media aggregation and coverage of journalism. Others criticized Moos for preempting the CJR story, while violating the spirit of Poynter's own standards. Other reporters called the criticism over the proper use of quotation marks "school-marmish" and "petty". Romenesko continued to offer his resignation, which Moos later accepted.
