= Philip Till =

Canadian talk show host

Philip Till was a talk show host in Vancouver, British Columbia. From 2005 til his retirement in July of 2014 he was the a.m. drive-time host of the CKNW Morning News with Philip Till from 5:30 a.m. - 8:30 a.m. He had been a talk show host on CKNW since 1989. Previous to hosting his own show, he co-hosted the afternoon drive time show "The World Today" with Jon McComb, who then became the solo host.

Before arriving in Vancouver he was the foreign editor and chief foreign correspondent NBC radio/TV networks 1970s-1989.

His last day broadcasting with CKNW was July 31, 2014.
