= Dave Benz =

American sportscaster

- Education: State University of New York at Oswego
- Years active: 2009–present
- Sports commentary career
- Genre: Sports anchor
- Sports: NBA; NFL; NCAA football; NCAA basketball

Dave Benz is an American broadcaster who formerly served as the television play-by-play announcer for the Minnesota Timberwolves of the National Basketball Association (NBA).

== Broadcasting career ==
=== Comcast SportsNet ===
Benz hosted several programs for the San Francisco 49ers, such as 49ers Postgame Live, 49ers Central, and 49ers Press Conference. He hosted pregame/postgame shows for the Golden State Warriors, Oakland Athletics, and the San Jose Sharks and was an anchor for SportsNet Central. He also did play-by-play for college basketball, reported for Sportsnet Reporters, and was the voice of the San Jose SaberCats of the Arena Football League.

=== KNBR-AM ===
He has also worked for KNBR-AM as a fill-in host for The Gary Radnich Show, The Damon Bruce Show, and Sportsphone 680.

=== WTTG-TV ===
Benz was also employed by WTTG-TV as a sports anchor/reporter and hosted pregame/halftime/postgame shows for the Washington Redskins.

=== The Mountain ===
Benz also called college basketball games for the MountainWest Sports Network.

=== KLZ-560 AM ===
Dave also was a talk show host for KLZ-560 AM and was the host of a four-hour talk show host, Sportstown.

=== Fox Sports/Fox Sports Net/Bally Sports ===
While working for the Fox Sports family, hosted several shows for Fox Sports Rocky Mountain such as AFL Weekly, Broncos Preview, Rockies All Access, Rockies Roundup, Crush Weekly, Insider Edition, and The Buffalo Stampede. He did play-by-play for Colorado Rockies spring training, hosted pregame/postgame shows for various sports such as college football and basketball, play-by-play commentator for the Colorado Crush, Colorado State Tigers men's basketball, and Colorado Buffalos men's and women's basketball and Denver Pioneers men's basketball, sideline reporting for the Colorado Crush and the Colorado Buffalos; football and men's basketball. He also did some sideline reporting for the Fox NFL Sunday. He was the host of Mavericks Live, a pregame/postgame show host for the Dallas Mavericks and performed the same role for the San Antonio Spurs. He also hosted Florida Sports Report and Southwest Sports Report.

=== Other work ===
He worked as sports anchor and sports reporter at WTTV and WXIN as well as a sports director for WUTR-TV. He was the pregame/postgame host for the Colorado Rockies Radio Network and hosted shows Softball 360, SledHead 24/7, and Autoweek. He was also the pregame/halftime/postgame host for the Green Bay Packers Radio Network. His other play-by-play experiences came from the Green Bay Bombers and the Wisconsin Blast. The Minnesota Timberwolves hired Benz to replace Tom Hanneman as the voice of the Timberwolves. He was let go by the Timberwolves in May 2022.
