= FanDuel Sports Network North =

Regional sports network in the Upper Midwest and Minnesota

- Type: Regional sports network
- Country: United States
- Broadcast area: Minnesota; Wisconsin; Iowa; North Dakota; South Dakota; Nationwide (via satellite)
- Network: FanDuel Sports Network
- Headquarters: Minneapolis, Minnesota

Programming
- Language: English
- Picture format: 720p (HDTV); 480i (SDTV)

Ownership
- Owner: Main Street Sports Group

History
- Launched: March 1, 1989
- Replaced: WCCO II
- Closed: September 30, 2026 (3 days ago)
- Former names: Midwest Sports Channel (1989–2001); Fox Sports Net North (2001–2004); FSN North (2004–2008); Fox Sports North (2008–2021); Bally Sports North (2021–2024)

Links
- Website: www.fanduelsportsnetwork.com

Availability (some events may air on overflow feed FanDuel Sports Network North Extra due to event conflicts)

Streaming media
- FanDuel Sports Network app: www.fanduelsportsnetwork.com/ (U.S. cable internet subscribers only; requires login from participating providers to stream content; some events may not be available due to league rights restrictions)
- DirecTV Stream: Internet Protocol television

FanDuel Sports Network North was an American regional sports network owned by Main Street Sports Group (formerly Diamond Sports Group) and operated as a FanDuel Sports Network affiliate. The channel broadcast coverage of sporting events involving teams located in the Upper Midwest region, with a focus on professional and collegiate sports teams based in Minnesota.

The network maintained production studios and offices located in downtown Minneapolis, which were shared with production and office operations of Fanduel Sports Network Wisconsin, which formerly served as a subfeed of Fox Sports North until it was spun off into a separate channel in 2006.

FanDuel Sports Network North was available on cable providers throughout Minnesota, western Wisconsin, northern Iowa, North Dakota, and South Dakota; it was available nationwide on satellite via DirecTV.

== History ==
=== Origins ===
The channel originated sometime in 1982 as WCCO II, a local cable channel owned by Midwest Radio and Television (later Midwest Communications), and created as a project by CBS affiliate WCCO-TV (channel 4, now an owned-and-operated station of the network) that broadcast a slate of local and general entertainment programming. On March 1, 1989, it was relaunched as the Midwest Sports Channel. That same year, the channel acquired rights to Minnesota Twins broadcasts.

MSC's main draws in its early days were games from the Minnesota Twins and Minnesota North Stars. The channel also served as an affiliate of SportsChannel America, filling much of its broadcast day with a mix of national programs and paid programming from the channel, and incorporated sports news tickers provided by the channel. MSC was largely considered a premium channel until the early 1990s, and did not even have full cable coverage in the Minneapolis–St. Paul metropolitan area until it was added by Continental Cablevision's St. Paul system on its expanded basic cable lineup in 1994.

During the North Stars' 1991 Stanley Cup Playoff run, Midwest Sports Channel declined to exercise an option to carry the North Stars' home games (as the SportsChannel America package which MSC carried did not include rights to in-market home games). Instead the North Stars cut a revenue-sharing deal with a group of 11 cable companies to televise the games as a pay-per-view events at a then very expensive price of $12.95 a game.

The following season the North Stars parted ways with Midwest Sports Channel and instead signed a new contract with Prime Sports Midwest to televise 17 games out-of-market while in-market viewers would be offered the games on pay-per-view through the same revenue sharing agreement with local cable operators that was used for the previous season's playoffs. The price for these games were $9.95 each with an option to purchase the entire package at a reduced rate. Additionally, 25 games were televised on KMSP-TV.

=== Ownership changes and affiliation with FSN ===
Fox Sports North logo, 2012-2021

In 1992, CBS acquired the Midwest Sports Channel, through its purchase of Midwest Communications (which it previously had 47% ownership). For the 1992-93 season MSC once again televised some North Stars games, but the channel lost the broadcast rights permanently when the North Stars relocated to Dallas after the end of the season. MSC expanded its lineup of professional sports events in 1995, after it landed a television contract with the Minnesota Timberwolves to hold the regional cable rights to the team's games for the 95-96 season.

The following year, the Wisconsin Sports Network (a gametime-only network broadcasting Milwaukee Brewers and Bucks games), which had been owned by Time Warner Cable's Milwaukee franchise and Group W (whose corporate parent, Westinghouse, had just merged with CBS), was folded into MSC, giving the network a broader reach throughout the Midwest, in addition to the rights to the Brewers and Bucks contracts, and a sizeable stable of local outdoor programs. In 1997, the Midwest Sports Channel became an affiliate of the recently created Fox Sports Net.

Shortly after completing its merger with CBS, on June 10, 2000, Viacom announced that it would sell the Midwest Sports Channel and Baltimore-based regional sports network Home Team Sports. On July 11, 2000, Comcast acquired the Midwest Sports Channel from CBS. News Corporation, which was a minority owner in the network and wanted to acquire the channel outright, attempted to block the deal,(as it would have been reworked into a Comcast SportsNet), filing a lawsuit on July 21 to stop the sale of MSC and Home Team Sports. On September 7, 2000, as part of a settlement between the two companies, Comcast traded its equity interest in Midwest Sports Channel to News Corporation in exchange for exclusive ownership of Home Team Sports (which subsequently joined Comcast SportsNet as Comcast SportsNet Mid-Atlantic). Through its existing content agreement with the channel, WCCO continued to broadcast a replay of its 10:00 p.m. newscast daily at 4:30 a.m. as an encore until the sale to Fox was finalized.

In 2000, MSC acquired the television rights to the Minnesota Wild, an NHL expansion team which began play that year; the deal was struck by Fox in May shortly before the lawsuit against Comcast was filed as part of its plans to start a Minnesota-based regional sports network. With the acquisition of the Wild broadcasts, MSC adopted FSN-branded graphics, with announcers frequently using the phrase "...live on MSC, Fox Sports Net style" during its game broadcasts.

This culminated in the channel's official rebranding as Fox Sports Net North in April 2001, coinciding with the start of that year's Minnesota Twins season and the opening of American Family Field (Then named Miller Park) as the home stadium of the Milwaukee Brewers; the new branding was heavily promoted on-air, on billboards and on bus advertisements. One side effect to the rebranding were resulting reductions to the network's budget; Fox also let the contracts to some events expire, forcing the network to depend more on programming from FSN's national schedule (such as the National Sports Report and You Gotta See This!).

In October 2003, Minnesota Twins owner Carl Pohlad attempted to launch a competing regional sports network, to be named Victory Sports One, which would broadcast all Twins games as well as local college and high school sport events. The channel was also expected to carry a number of locally produced sports shows, the centerpiece of which would be Kent Hrbek Outdoors. Victory Sports One launched in November 2003, however the effort folded in May 2004 after six months due to financial and cable carriage issues; after VS1 ceased operations, Fox Sports Net North absorbed most of the channel's programming including the television rights to the Twins. As a result, Fox Sports Net launched a new "local fans first" initiative, launching the daily regional news program Minnesota Sports Report and adding regular broadcasts of high school sport events.

In April 2006, still lacking a local news program after CBS Sold the channel (the now-defunct Minnesota Sports Report originated from FSN West and FSN West 2's studios in Downtown Los Angeles), FSN North launched FSN Live, a first-of-its-kind program serving as both a sports news show, and a pre-game and post-game analysis program for the channel's game broadcasts. FSN Live is usually broadcast live and on-location from sports events televised by the channel, though FSN Live originates from the FSN North studios in Minneapolis whenever the focused team is playing on the road. Regardless of the origin of FSN Live, the pregame show usually features a preview of the game from the announcers and a pregame press conference by the head coach or manager. Meanwhile, the postgame show includes an interview with the player of the game, postgame analysis from the announcers and the head coach or manager's postgame press conference.

On April 4, 2007, FSN North spun off its Wisconsin subfeed into FSN Wisconsin (now FanDuel Sports Network Wisconsin), a separate channel carrying Milwaukee Brewers and Milwaukee Bucks games as well as other events sourced from its former parent channel. Wild broadcasts are available throughout Wisconsin. In 2009, FSN North rebranded as Fox Sports North as part of a network-wide rebranding of the Fox Sports regional networks.

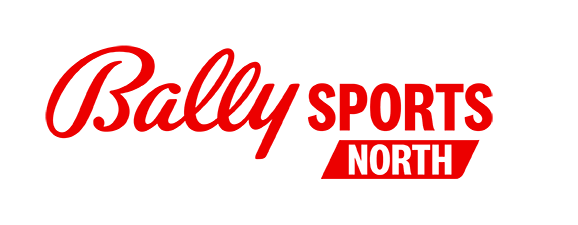
Former logo as Bally Sports North, used from 2021 to 2024.

On May 3, 2019, Sinclair MLB Local Media beginn Broadcast Group and Allen Media Group (via Diamond Sports Group, now Main Street Sports Group) acquired the Fox Sports Networks from Disney for $10.6 billion, as part of a divestment mandated during Disney's acquisition of 21st Century Fox. On March 31, 2021, the channel was rebranded as Bally Sports North as part of a sponsorship of the channels by casino operator Bally's Corporation.

=== Bankruptcy, closure ===
On February 15, 2023, Diamond Sports Group failed to make a $140 million interest payment, instead opting for a 30-day grace period to make the payment. On March 14, 2023, Diamond Sports Group filed for Chapter 11 bankruptcy protection.

During its bankruptcy, Diamond missed a payment to the Minnesota Twins. On April 5, 2023, Major League Baseball, on behalf of the Twins, filed an emergency motion asking the bankruptcy judge to order Diamond to pay the Twins fully or give its media rights back to the MLB. Diamond argued that because of cord-cutting the contract rate for the media rights of the teams was too high. A hearing on the matter was set for May 31, 2023. As an interim, on April 19, the bankruptcy judge ordered Diamond Sports to pay 50% of what the Twins were owed. On June 1, 2023, after a two-day hearing, the bankruptcy judge ordered Diamond to pay the Twins fully within five days.

On October 9, 2024, the Minnesota Twins announced that they would move their regional broadcasts to MLB Local Media beginning in the 2025 season. On October 21, the channel rebranded as FanDuel Sports Network North, following a change in sponsorship to sportsbook operator FanDuel.

In April 2026, following further financial difficulties, Main Street Sports Group announced that it would begin to wind down the operations of all FanDuel Sports Network channels following the conclusion of the NBA regular season, with some networks remaining active through at least late-April or early-May in order to cover the first round of the NHL's Stanley Cup playoffs, if applicable. FanDuel Sports Network North subsequently carried its final live telecast (and, in addition, the final live telecast across the chain as a whole) on April 30, which saw the Minnesota Wild defeat the Dallas Stars to win their first-round series.

== Programming ==
FanDuel Sports Network held the exclusive regional cable television rights to NBA games from the Minnesota Timberwolves (since 1995), and NHL games from the Minnesota Wild (since 2000). They also aired WNBA games from the Minnesota Lynx and AHL games from the Iowa Wild as well. The channel also broadcast NCAA Division I collegiate sporting events from the Minnesota Golden Gophers and the North Dakota Fighting Hawks. Finally the channel aired Minnesota Vikings related material, though it is limited to a pregame show airing on NFL Sundays a couple of hours before the game as well as replays of preseason action.

FanDuel Sports Network North also distributed some of its programming to FanDuel Sports Network Wisconsin, including a reduced schedule of Minnesota Wild games and competitions sanctioned by the Wisconsin Interscholastic Athletic Association (WIAA). Due to blackout restrictions imposed by the NBA, FanDuel Sports Network North was not permitted to broadcast Milwaukee Bucks games televised by FanDuel Sports Network Wisconsin.

=== Other Programming ===
FanDuel Sports Network North, when it was Fox Sports North, aired outdoor programming under the FSN Outdoors banner. This included fishing and hunting action. Also included is a portion of the national schedule which includes the World Poker Tour, as well as repeats of earlier national events on other Fox Sports branded channels. Select programming from FanDuel TV now airs on FDSN North due to the aforementioned naming rights deal.

=== FanDuel Sports Network North Extra ===
FanDuel Sports Network North operates FanDuel Sports Network North Extra as a 24-hour full-time HD channel that is used to carry additional programming including overflow live sports programming. Most providers carry the channel full-time, though some opt to carry it as a game-time only channel. Beginning in April 2021, the then-Bally Sports North has been using Sinclair-owned WUCW as a third overflow channel to accommodate several dates when all three professional sports teams are scheduled to play at the same time. These broadcasts are branded as Bally Sports Extra on The CW Twin Cities. For subscribers in the team's territories unable to access WUCW, these games are offered on the FanDuel Sports Network app.

=== Former Programming ===
FanDuel Sports Network North previously had the rights to the Minnesota United FC of Major League Soccer. It has carried telecasts of College Football and Basketball games from the Atlantic Coast Conference (ACC). Additionally, it aired Minnesota Golden Gophers ice hockey games, as well as college hockey games from the National Collegiate Hockey Conference schools the Minnesota Duluth Bulldogs and the St. Cloud State Huskies.

== On-air staff ==
=== Current ===
==== Minnesota Timberwolves ====
- Michael Grady – play-by-play announcer
- Marney Gellner - fill-in play-by-play announcer
- Jim Petersen – analyst
- Katie Storm – courtside reporter
- Marney Gellner – pregame/postgame host
- Rebekkah Brunson – pregame/postgame analyst
- Quincy Lewis – pregame/postgame analyst
- Kevin Lynch – pregame/postgame analyst

==== Minnesota Wild ====
- Anthony LaPanta – play-by-play announcer
- Ryan Carter – analyst
- Kevin Gorg – studio/rinkside analyst
- Wes Walz – studio analyst
- Tom Chorske – studio analyst
- Audra Martin – studio host

==== Minnesota Lynx ====
- Marney Gellner – Play-by-Play announcer
- Lea B Olson – analyst

==== Minnesota Vikings ====
(Preseason only)

- Paul Allen – play-by-play
- Pete Bercich – analyst
- Ben Leber – sideline reporter

==== Iowa Wild ====
- Joe O'Donnell – play-by-play

==== Other ====
- Ann Carroll – host/reporter

=== Former ===
- Dick Bremer – Twins play-by-play announcer
- Tom Hanneman – studio host (deceased)
- Bert Blyleven – Twins analyst
- Jamie Hersch – Twins/Wild studio host (now at NHL Network)
- Greg Coleman – Vikings sideline reporter (retired)
- Dave Benz – Timberwolves play-by-play announcer
- Callum Williams – Minnesota United play-by-play (now at Apple TV)
- Kyndra de St. Aubin – Minnesota United analyst (now at Apple TV)
- Charlie Beattie – Minnesota United sideline reporter/analyst
- Doug McLeod – University of Minnesota Hockey play-by-play announcer
- Ben Clymer – University of Minnesota Hockey analyst

==== Minnesota Twins ====
- Cory Provus – play-by-play announcer
- Chris Vosters – fill-in play-by-play announcer
- Justin Morneau – analyst
- Jack Morris – analyst
- LaTroy Hawkins – analyst
- Anthony LaPanta – pregame/postgame host & fill-in play-by-play announcer
- Roy Smalley – pregame/postgame analyst
- Glen Perkins – pregame/postgame analyst
- Marney Gellner – on-field reporter
- Audra Martin – on-field reporter
- Katie Storm -- studio host
- Tim Laudner -- studio analyst
