= Victory Sports One =

Defunct American regional sports network in Minnesota

- Country: United States
- Broadcast area: Minneapolis-Saint Paul and outlying areas
- Affiliates: KSTC-TV

Programming
- Language: American English

Ownership
- Owner: Carl Pohlad
- Key people: Kevin Cattoor, President

History
- Launched: 31 October 2003
- Closed: 8 May 2004

Victory Sports One was a cable and satellite television regional sports network owned by the Minnesota Twins baseball team. It was first conceived in 2001 and launched on October 31, 2003. Victory Sports was the exclusive cable TV home of Twins games for the first month of the 2004 season; in addition, it was planned to have coverage of various Minnesota college and high school games along with outdoors programming, including former Twin Kent Hrbek's popular program. The channel also simulcast ESPNEWS.

The Twins opted to take their local broadcast rights in-house after the 2003 season, ending a 15-year partnership with MSC/FSN North. The model for the plan was the success of the New York Yankees' YES Network.

Victory Sports was slated to air 105 Twins games, with the other 57 airing on KSTC-TV. However, it was unable to obtain carriage from the primary cable television providers in the Twin Cities, the rest of the state of Minnesota, and the Dakotas, or from DirecTV or Dish Network. These providers balked at the $2.20-per-subscriber price that the Pohlads were demanding, which they felt was too much for a regional sports network, especially for one which would be effectively dark to most viewers from October to March, as FSN North held the rights to the Timberwolves and Wild. The cable companies were only willing to air it on a digital tier, but the Pohlads insisted that it air on basic cable. It did, however, sign contracts with several smaller providers. By April 2004, so few providers had signed on with the network that it was apparent it would never be viable. After a month in which only a tiny percentage of Twins fans could watch games locally, Victory Sports One signed off on May 8. The Twins quickly re-signed with FSN North to placate viewers inconvenienced by the change, and were able to obtain a significant increase in cable revenue over their previous contract with FSN North. Kent Hrbek Outdoors quickly found a new home on KMSP-TV.
