= Bud Kraehling =

Jerome "Bud" Kraehling (/ˈkreɪliːŋ/; June 19, 1918 – June 3, 2015) was an American journalist and weatherman, whose career spanned over 50 years.

== Early life ==
Kraehling was born in 1918 in Warsaw, Illinois. His first experience in broadcasting was at nearby Carthage High School (now Illini West High School), where he played records and read the farm report. After a job at WGIL in nearby Galesburg, Kraehling served in the Army in the Philippines during World War II.

== Career ==
In 1946, Kraehling moved to the Twin Cities, taking a job on WTCN radio, before moving to WTCN (now WCCO) TV in 1949. In 1950, he started doing a short weather report during the 10 p.m. news. Kraehling continued in this capacity for the next 46 years, spanning many changes in the industry and advancements in technology. He was known for his gentlemanly and affable demeanor, and was called "trusted" and the station's "Walter Cronkite of weather.

He retired in 1996, he was hired as a greeter by the Minnesota History Center. He and his second wife, singer Shirley Lockwood, performed in various venues around the Twin Cities as "The Weatherman and the Singing Lady".

== Accomplishments ==
He was the first broadcaster in the Twin Cities to use weather radar, the first to use the newly built Shell Weather Tower, and was a longtime advocate to separate commercials from the broadcast itself (in-show product-hawking was a common practice in the 1950s).

== Personal life ==
Kraehling was married twice: to Natalie Harris until her death in 1998, and to Shirley Lockwood from 2004 until his death.

Kraehling died of cancer on June 3, 2015. He was survived by his second wife, four children by his first marriage: Candice, Cinda, Claudia, and Katie, grandchildren, and great-grandchildren.
