= Don Shelby =

American journalist

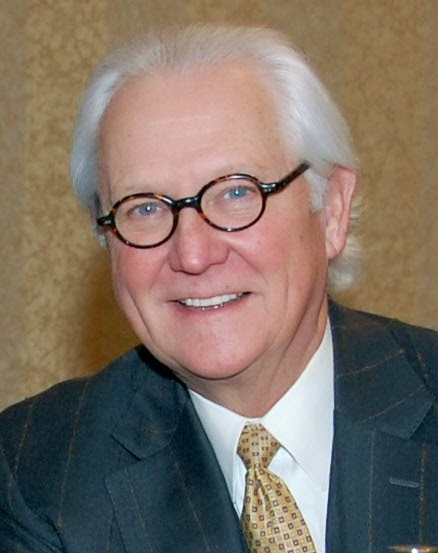
- Shelby in 2014
- Born: Donald Gilbert Shelby; May 27, 1947 (age 79); Muncie, Indiana
- Occupations: Investigative journalist, news anchor
- Television: WCCO-TV News anchor
- Spouse: Barbara
- Children: Ashley, Lacy, Delta
- Mother: Lacy Shelby
- Awards: Emmy, Peabody, Columbia DuPont Citation, Scripps-Howard Award, Society of Professional Journalists Distinguished Service Award

Donald Gilbert Shelby (born May 27, 1947) is a retired American journalist who was a news anchor on WCCO-TV in Minneapolis, Minnesota for much of his career. He is regarded as an experienced investigative journalist, as his work has earned two Peabody awards and three Emmy Awards. He also has won the other three top journalism awards of the United States, including the Columbia DuPont Citation, the Scripps-Howard Award and the Society of Professional Journalists Distinguished Service Award.

== Early life ==
Shelby was born and raised in Royerton, Indiana, near Muncie. He was a high school basketball standout. He attended the University of Cincinnati for two years, but left to enlist in the United States Air Force. He met his wife, Barbara, when he was stationed at Bolling Air Force base in Washington, D.C., where Barbara worked as an administrative assistant. Shelby was honorably discharged in 1972 after serving four years. He worked in Charleston, South Carolina and Houston, Texas before arriving in Minneapolis.

== WCCO-TV ==
Shelby joined WCCO-TV in the summer of 1978 as a news reporter. After continued work as a reporter, Shelby began assuming anchor responsibilities in greater capacity, eventually assuming the primary anchor chair from Dave Moore. Shelby was the chief architect behind WCCO's "I-Team" segment, which spotlighted current issues, both local and on a larger world scale, with rigorous investigative journalism. After suffering a mild stroke in early 2004, Shelby returned to news reading duties by the end of that year. In 2009, Shelby was reported to make US$1 Million, before taking a 10% pay cut in 2010 to help WCCO trim costs. Shelby retired from television after his final WCCO-TV newscast on November 22, 2010.

During a Minnesota-themed segment of The Late Show with David Letterman, the camera cut to the WCCO newsroom. Don Shelby turned to WCCO co-anchor Amelia Santaniello and said, "Amelia, I have a gopher in my pants and his name is Carlos."

=== War and conflict reporting ===
Shelby covered numerous international conflicts as a correspondent, including the Yom Kippur War in 1973 and the Iraq War. Major General Richard Nash, commander of forces in the southern half of Iraq, referred to Don as "our Ernie Pyle."

=== "Good To Know" ===
In February 2006, Shelby began hosting a series of video essay segments entitled "In The Know" (later renamed "Good To Know"), during the station's 10:00 newscast. These segments sometimes touched on political, religious and other topics, usually with the same pointed journalistic style of Shelby's earlier "I-Team" efforts.

=== "Project Energy" ===
In April, 2006, Shelby's environmental series "Project Energy" began airing on WCCO. The regular news segment focused on climate change, energy consumption, and conservation was one of the earliest examples of local broadcast journalism focused on climate change.

== WCCO-AM radio ==
From 2000 through 2009, Shelby undertook a dual responsibility of hosting an afternoon radio show on WCCO (AM) which ended at 6:00, immediately after which he anchored the TV newscast (also simulcast on radio). He partnered on the radio with WCCO radio news anchor Jeff McKinney. In June 2009, Monday Night Football sideline reporter Michele Tafoya took over the 3:30 p.m. to 6:00 p.m. time slot, with Shelby moving to the early afternoon drive, then sharing the microphone with Michelle from 3:00 p.m. to 3:30 p.m. Shelby's final radio show took place on December 11, 2009.

== Community work ==
Shelby has played an active role in the preservation and maintenance of the Mississippi River. Through his WCCO-TV segment entitled "Project Energy", Shelby has investigated energy conservation, renewable energy, and alternative fuels. Shelby has also given his time as an on-air representative for a number of pledge drives on behalf of the local PBS station TPT (KTCA), as well as narrated the third installment of "Lost Twin Cities", a TPT produced documentary. He appeared in "America Unearthed".

== Stage acting ==
Don appeared in the Lab Theater's production of Rocky Horror, appearing with numerous Guthrie actors in a performance of 8 at the Varsity Theater in 2011. He was a featured actor in Safe at Home at the Mixed Blood Theatre. He has performed the character of Mark Twain more than 200 times, in shows at performing arts centers throughout the state of Minnesota. He also has performed as Mark Twain in New Orleans and aboard the Delta Queen Riverboat on the Mississippi River in St. Louis. His final performance as Mark Twain was on April 20, 2026 at Chanhassen Dinner Theater. H

Shelby appeared in “Love Letters” with Nancy Nelson at Chanhassen Dinner Theatres, beginning in November 2022. The run was so successful that it returned the following February and was slated for a third run in October 2024. It had two subsequent runs in 2025 and 2026.

== Awards ==
- Emmy (2010 - Best Anchor, 2021 - Narrator)
- George Foster Peabody Award (1984 and 1997)
- Columbia DuPont Citation
- Scripps-Howard Award
- Society of Professional Journalists Distinguished Service Award
- Distinguished Minnesotan Award (2009)
- Reverend Dr. Martin Luther King Jr. Humanitarian of the Year, and honored by B'nai B'rith with the Great American Traditions award
- National Academy of Television Arts and Sciences Silver Circle
- International Radio and Television News Directors First Place Award

== Personal life ==
Known to many in the Minnesota community as a "jack-of-all-trades," Shelby has many hobbies, including, among other things, beekeeping. Shelby has been an enthusiastic fan of women's basketball. He is a resident of Excelsior, Minnesota, in a farmhouse certified LEED Platinum. His eldest daughter is the novelist and short story writer Ashley Shelby.

=== Author ===
His first book, The Season Never Ends: Wins, Losses, and the Wisdom of the Game, was published on August 30, 2011. It features a foreword by former University of Minnesota men's basketball head coach Tubby Smith and endorsements from NBA analyst Ahmad Rashad and author Will Weaver.

=== Health ===
Shelby has suffered multiple strokes, including one in 2004 during his broadcasting career. He subsequently suffered another stroke in 2021.

In 2016, Shelby shared his story of his recovery from alcohol addiction and has been sober since 1980.

=== Shelby Knot ===
Shelby, in his time on television, popularized the Pratt necktie knot, to the extent that it is sometimes referred to as the "Shelby Knot" or "Pratt-Shelby." The knot was created by Jerry Pratt, an employee of the US Chamber of Commerce, who taught it to Shelby in 1986. The knot was considered at the time to be "the first new knot for men in over 50 years" by the New York Times. It is speculated that the knot had been in use for a time, but the knot simply had not been documented until Don Shelby made it famous by the help of Jerry Pratt and the Minneapolis clothier Kingford Bavender. Kingford Bavender is considered to have coined the term the "Shelby" knot.

In honor of the history of the Shelby Knot and Don Shelby, a bespoke clothier company by the name of King Brothers Clothiers partnered with Mr. Shelby and launched the Shelby Knot Collection of ties in the spring of 2013. Together, Don Shelby and King Brothers Clothiers, selected the designs of the ties that reflected Don's tastes.
