= Tom Hanneman =

American sports announcer (1952–2020)

Tom Hanneman (June 29, 1952 – December 18, 2020) was an American play-by-play television announcer for the Minnesota Timberwolves basketball team of the National Basketball Association (NBA) and had been with the franchise since its inception in 1989 until he joined Fox Sports North in 2012. Prior to that, Hanneman was a sports and general assignment reporter for CBS affiliate WCCO-TV in Minneapolis, Minnesota. During his time at WCCO, Hanneman drew national attention when he was held hostage while covering the 1979 Red Lake Indian Reservation uprising. His time as a Timberwolves commentator also led to him doing some national and international NBA broadcasts. Tom Hanneman died on December 18, 2020. He was 68 years old at the time of his death.

== Career ==
=== WCCO ===
In the early 1970s, Hanneman started working at WCCO-TV, where he worked as a dispatcher and covered two Minnesota Vikings Super Bowl appearances, the 1984 Winter Olympics in Sarajevo and the 1987 World Series run for the Minnesota Twins. He would work at the network for 16 years. In May 1979, Hanneman and photographer Keith Brown drew national attention after they were held hostage while covering an uprising at Red Lake Reservation and narrowly escaped.

=== Minnesota Timberwolves ===
Between 1989 and 2012, Hanneman did commentary for the Minnesota Timberwolves. He began his career with Timberwolves broadcasts serving as a court-side reporter and host before eventually becoming the team's play-by-play commentator. He would serve on both the radio and television broadcasts for Timberwolves games. For four seasons, Hanneman served as the studio host of NBA Radio, covering NBA All-Star Weekend, the NBA Game of the Week and expanded NBA playoff and draft coverage. His radio work also took him to Toronto, where he hosted 1994 World Championship of Basketball. He also managed to host a weekly radio show for the BBC in London, in addition to broadcasts in Australia and New Zealand.

=== Fox Sports North ===
Hanneman was the studio host for Fox Sports North for the network's Minnesota Timberwolves, Minnesota Wild, the Minnesota Twins and Minnesota Golden Gophers hockey games from 2012 until his death in 2020.

== Personal life ==
Hanneman was born in La Crosse, Wisconsin, to a family of 8 brothers and sisters which migrated throughout the Midwest, before landing in Minneapolis. He first went to college at Minnesota State University, where he became a disc jockey, and then the University of Minnesota, where he got his first job as a radio reporter. Hanneman was married for over four decades to Nancy, with whom he had three children, Adam, Courtney and Kyle. They also had five grandchildren. He was a 2020 Upper Midwest Emmy Chapter Silver Circle Honoree.

== Accolades/Awards ==
In 2009, Hanneman won the Midwest Emmy for On-Camera Talent – Sports Play-by-Play: Minnesota Timberwolves Television.

Documentary – Historical “Spotlight: Twins Platoon”, Fox Sports Net North, Minneapolis, Jeff Byle, Executive Producer, Trevor Fleck, Producer, Dan Truebenbach, Photographer, Tom Hanneman, Narrator

Public/Current/Community Affairs “Our Heroes: A Black History Month Special”, Fox Sports Net North, Minneapolis, Jeff Byle, Executive Producer, Trevor Fleck, Producer, Dan Truebenbach, Photographer / Editor, Ralph Gasow, Photographer, Nick Kesler, Photographer, Chris Ritchie, Editor, Robyne Robinson, Host, Tom Hanneman, Reporter, Marney Gellner, Reporter, Telly Hughes, Reporter

In 2005, Hanneman won the Midwest Emmy for On-Camera Talent – Sports Play-by-Play: Minnesota Timberwolves Television.

Sports Program

The Year That Was FSN North Trevor Fleck, Producer Paul Hipp Dan Truebenbach Tom Hanneman

In 2004, Hanneman won the Ray Scott Award For Excellence in Sports Broadcasting.

Broadcaster of the Week:

In 2020, Hanneman was made Upper Midwest Emmy Chapter Silver Circle Honoree
