= Sid Hartman =

American sports journalist (1920–2020)

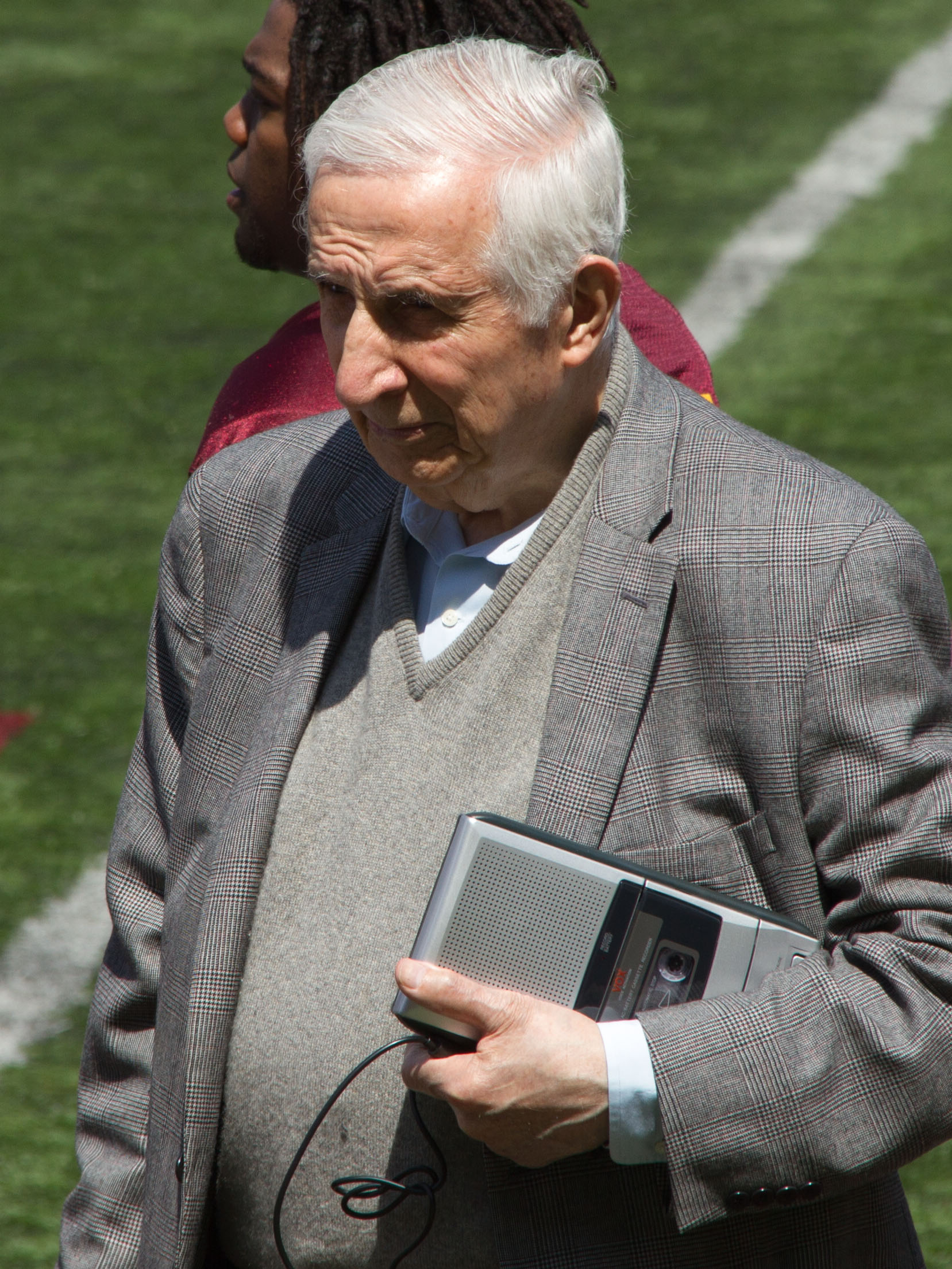
- Sid Hartman in 2013
- Born: Sidney Hartman; March 15, 1920; Minneapolis, Minnesota, U.S.
- Died: October 18, 2020 (aged 100); Minneapolis, Minnesota, U.S.
- Occupation: Sports journalist
- Years active: 1945–2020
- Notable credit: Star Tribune
- Spouse: Barbara Balfour (m. 1964; div. 1972)
- Children: 2, including Chad

Sidney Hartman (March 15, 1920 – October 18, 2020) was an American sports journalist for the Minneapolis Star Tribune and the WCCO 830 AM radio station. For 20 years, he was also a panellist on the weekly television program Sports Show with Mike Max, which aired Sunday nights at 9:30 p.m. on WUCW 23 in the Twin Cities metro area. He continued writing for the Star Tribune until his death in 2020.

== Early life ==
Sidney Hartman was born at Maternity Hospital on Glenwood Avenue in Minneapolis, Minnesota, on March 15, 1920. He grew up in a Jewish family in north Minneapolis. His father, Jack Hechtman, was born in Russia and immigrated to the United States at age 16, changing his name to Hartman after he arrived. Sid Hartman's mother, Celia Weinberg, immigrated to the United States from Latvia at age nine. Both his parents died in 1972.

Jack Hartman could neither read nor write and suffered from alcoholism. He made his living by driving a delivery truck, primarily making furniture deliveries. Celia Hartman owned an apparel store on the north side of Minneapolis and also did the bookkeeping for Jack Hartman's delivery business. The family moved frequently, living first at a home on Aldrich Avenue, then at a home on Humboldt Avenue, and later at homes in the 700 block of Irving Avenue.

Hartman attended Talmud Torah Jewish School from age 10 to 14, before enrolling at Minneapolis North High School. He began selling newspapers at age nine. As a teenager, he developed the use of newspaper boxes, where customers would pay for newspapers on the honor system by leaving coins in a change box.

Hartman attended Minneapolis North High School but dropped out his junior year when he received a lucrative news run for delivering the Minneapolis Tribune. In 1941, he lost his Tribune news run when the Des Moines newspaper magnate John Cowles Sr. bought the Tribune Company. For a brief time, Hartman became a vacuum salesman, but the occupation did not suit him. In his autobiography, Hartman conceded that he was "the world's worst vacuum cleaner salesman." After Pearl Harbor, Hartman attempted to enlist in the United States military during World War II but was rejected because of his asthma.

In the early 1940s, Hartman got a key break from Louie Mohs, the circulation manager of the Minneapolis Times. Mohs gave him the Times news run for downtown Minneapolis, which paid well and got Hartman out of the vacuum business. In 1944 Hartman got an even bigger break when Mohs recommended him to Times sports editor and columnist Dick Cullum, who was looking for a sports desk intern. Cullum hired Hartman, the beginning of a sports writing career that would last over 75 years.

=== Minneapolis Lakers ===
As a 27-year-old in 1947, Hartman became the acting general manager of the Minneapolis Lakers. Hartman helped build what would become the first dynasty in the NBA.

== Sports columnist ==
Hartman was a popular, widely read and widely heard sports columnist throughout his career. For seven decades, Hartman served as the "radio and print voice of Minnesota sports." The columns he wrote were strong on reporting, while the writing was less admired. Dick Cullum, Hartman's first editor, explained it this way: "Writers are a dime a dozen, but reporters are impossible to find." Steve Rushin of Sports Illustrated observed that "English sometimes appears to be his second language." On September 11, 1945, Hartman wrote his first column for Minneapolis' Star Tribune newspaper and would continue writing columns with the newspaper until his death in 2020.

From 1955 until his death, Hartman also appeared as a radio sportscaster and commentator on Minneapolis' WCCO Radio. One of the elements of his style – often caricatured by local comics and other radio personalities – was his habit while interviewing a sports figure of referring to him or her as "my close personal friend". Over the years, his "close personal friends" have included George Steinbrenner, Bob Knight, Lou Holtz, and Carl Yastrzemski.

== Tributes ==
A statue of Hartman was unveiled outside of Target Center in downtown Minneapolis on October 10, 2010. The Minnesota Vikings honored Hartman by naming the media entrance at U.S. Bank Stadium after him, with photos of Hartman adorning the media entrance of U.S. Bank Stadium. They also named the interview room at their new practice facility in Eagan, Minnesota, in honor of him. Moreover, a pizza – the Sid's Special – was named in tribute to him at the Italian restaurant Vescio's in Dinkytown, Minneapolis (closed in March 2018). A statue of Hartman is also located outside Target Field. In addition to having the media room at U.S. Bank Stadium named in his honor, Hartman would also have media rooms at Target Field named in his honor as well.

The University of Minnesota renamed the press box at its football home of TCF Bank Stadium the Sid Hartman Press Box on November 17, 2018. The university issued a press release ending with, "The Sid Hartman Press Box is a tribute to his work, his life and his legacy."

== Personal life ==
Hartman's name was among tens of thousands on Ponzi schemer Bernie Madoff's client list. It is not publicly known how much money, if any, Hartman lost with Madoff when the $50 billion fraud was exposed late in 2008.

Hartman married Barbara Balfour in 1964. They later divorced in 1972. Hartman's son Chad Hartman also has a radio show on WCCO. He also had an adopted daughter. Hartman described former Lakers player, former Vikings coach and frequent radio guest Bud Grant, whom he had known since 1945, as his "close personal friend". He was also the one who inducted Grant into the Pro Football Hall of Fame in 1994.

In December 2016, Hartman was hospitalized in Minneapolis after falling and breaking his right hip. He underwent surgery to repair his hip the following day. As a result, Hartman announced his columns would be placed on hiatus. He returned to work on January 13, 2017, attending the news conference for new Gophers football coach P. J. Fleck.

Hartman turned 100 in March 2020. He had 21,149 bylines by that time. Minnesota Twins Hall of Famer Rod Carew described Hartman as his "buddy" and "the only guy that I trusted when I was [in Minnesota], that I could talk to and not worry about it." Minnesota Vikings Hall of Fame quarterback Fran Tarkenton described Hartman as his "best friend in Minnesota" and "the greatest journalist, most honest, forthcoming journalist, sports journalist that I've ever known".

Hartman also met with renowned local musician Prince during the time he was preparing for his 2007 Super Bowl XLI halftime show performance.

== Death ==
On October 18, 2020, Hartman died at the age of 100. His final column, a discussion with Minnesota Vikings wide receiver Adam Thielen, was published by the Star Tribune that same day. Thielen, Vikings Hall of Famer Randy Moss and Vikings owners Mark and Zygi Wilf were among those who paid tribute, along with numerous Minnesota Twins players and executives, Minnesota Timberwolves and Lynx owner Glen Taylor, Timberwolves coach Ryan Saunders, the spokespersons for the Minnesota Golden Gophers men's basketball and football teams and Minnesota governor Tim Walz.

== Works ==
Hartman published two books:

- Sid!: The Sports Legends, the Inside Scoops, and the Close Personal Friends is an autobiography of Sid Hartman. The book discusses many of the events in the Minnesota sports scene from 1940 onward.
- Sid Hartman's Great Minnesota Sports Moments
