= Chad Hartman =

American sports talk show host

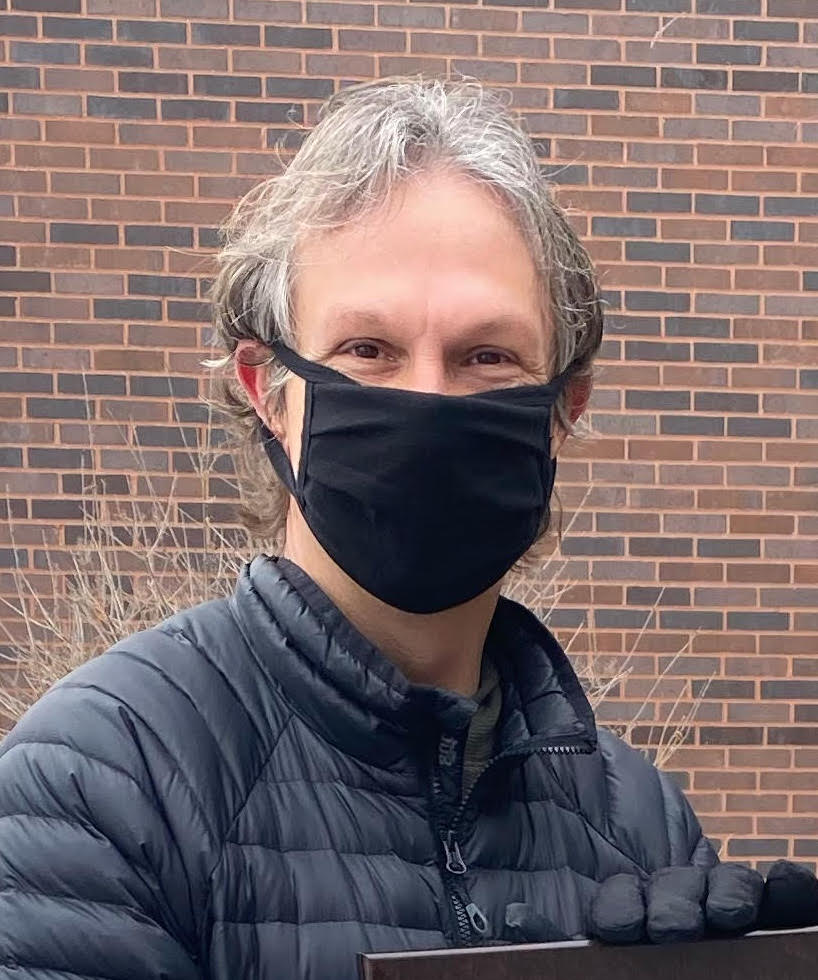
Chad Hartman in 2020.

Chad Hartman is an American radio talk show host on WCCO-AM.

== Personal ==
Hartman is the son of longtime Minnesota sportswriter Sid Hartman.

Hartman graduated from Robbinsdale Armstrong High School. In 1988 he graduated from Arizona State University.

== History as KFAN radio host ==
Hartman's previous job was at KFAN, headquartered in St. Louis Park, Minnesota. His show aired every weekday from 2 to 4 pm. Hartman interviewed so many guests on his show, he earned the nickname "The Barbara Walters of the Fan".

Hartman was terminated by KFAN management, Clear Channel Communications, in January 2009. He was the longest-tenured remaining member of KFAN's predecessor – WDGY.

Hartman was the primary radio voice for the Minnesota Timberwolves from 1997 to 2006.
