= WCCO-TV =

Television station in Minneapolis

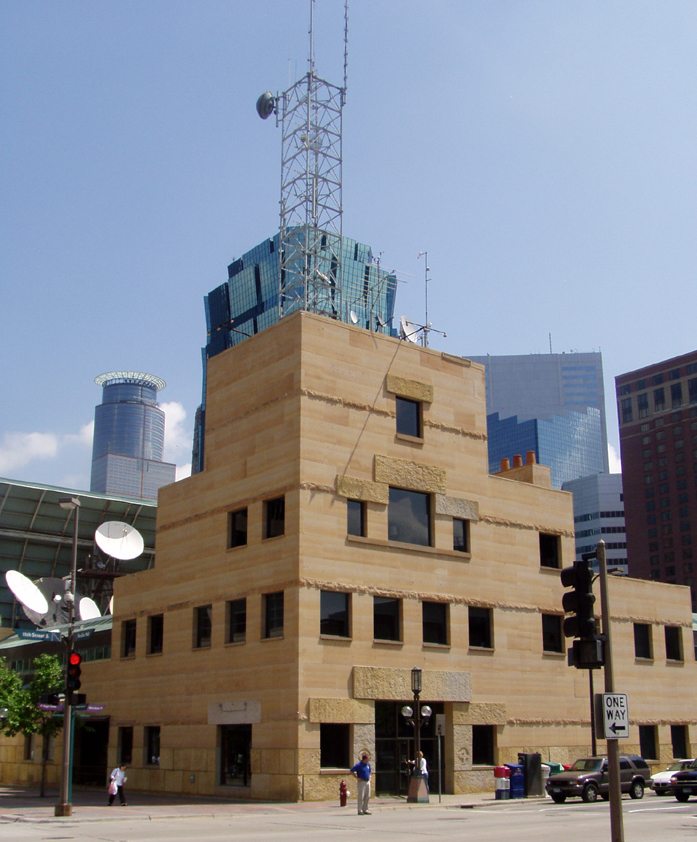
- WCCO-TV's downtown Minneapolis headquarters as seen in 2006
- Minneapolis–Saint Paul, Minnesota; United States
- City: Minneapolis, Minnesota
- Channels: Digital: 32 (UHF); Virtual: 4
- Branding: WCCO; WCCO News / CBS News Minnesota

Programming
- Affiliations: 4.1: CBS; for others, see § Subchannels

Ownership
- Owner: CBS Television Stations; (CBS Broadcasting Inc.)

History
- First air date: July 1, 1949
- Former call signs: WTCN-TV (1949–1952)
- Former channel numbers: Analog: 4 (VHF, 1949–2009)
- Former affiliations: ABC (secondary, 1949–1953)
- Call sign meaning: Derived from WCCO radio

Technical information
- Licensing authority: FCC
- Facility ID: 9629
- ERP: 1,000 kW
- HAAT: 455.9 m (1,496 ft)
- Transmitter coordinates: 45°3′45″N 93°8′22″W
- Translator(s): see § Translators

Links
- Public license information: Public file; LMS
- Website: www.cbsnews.com/minnesota/

WCCO-TV (channel 4), branded as CBS Minnesota, is a television station licensed to Minneapolis, Minnesota, United States, serving the Twin Cities area. It is owned and operated by the CBS television network through its CBS Television Stations division, and maintains studios on South 11th Street along Nicollet Mall in downtown Minneapolis; its transmitter is located at the Telefarm complex in Shoreview, Minnesota.

WCCO-TV's programming is also seen on full-power satellite station KCCW-TV (channel 12) in Walker (with transmitter near Hackensack). Nielsen Media Research treats WCCO-TV and KCCW-TV as one station in local ratings books, using the identifier name WCCO+. From 1987 until 2017, WCCO-TV operated a second satellite, KCCO-TV (virtual and VHF digital channel 7) in Alexandria (with transmitter near Westport).

WCCO is one of three owned-and-operated network affiliates in the Twin Cities market, the others being Fox O&O KMSP-TV (channel 9) and MyNetworkTV O&O WFTC (channel 9.2).

== History ==
WCCO-TV's roots originate with a radio station, but not WCCO (830 AM). WRHM, which signed on the air in 1925, is the radio station to which WCCO-TV traces its lineage. In 1934, two newspapers—the Minneapolis Tribune and the Saint Paul Pioneer Press-Dispatch—formed a joint venture by the name of "Twin Cities Newspapers", which purchased the radio station and changed its call letters to WTCN. Twin Cities Newspapers later expanded into the fledgling FM band with WTCN-FM, and shortly thereafter to the then-new medium of television with the launch of WTCN-TV on July 1, 1949, becoming Minnesota's second television station, broadcasting from the Radio City Theater at 50 South 9th Street in downtown Minneapolis. The station's first president was Robert Ridder. Channel 4 has been a primary CBS affiliate since its sign on; it is the only major commercial station in the Minneapolis–St. Paul market not to have changed its primary affiliation. However, it had a secondary affiliation with ABC during its early years, from 1949 to 1953, until a new station using the WTCN-TV calls (now KARE-TV) picked up the ABC affiliation, retaining it from its 1953 sign on until 1961 when it became an independent station; it has been affiliated with NBC since 1979.

Twin Cities Newspapers sold off its broadcast holdings in 1952, with channel 4 going to the Murphy and McNally families, who had recently bought the Twin Cities' dominant radio station, WCCO, from CBS. The stations merged under a new company, Midwest Radio and Television, with CBS as a minority partner. The call letters of channel 4 were changed to WCCO-TV to match its new radio sibling on August 17 (the WTCN-TV call sign appeared again in the market the following year on the new channel 11). CBS was forced to sell its minority ownership stake in the WCCO stations in 1954 to comply with Federal Communications Commission (FCC) ownership limits of the time.

The station began telecasting color programs in 1955. In 1959, WCCO became the first station in the Midwest to have a videotape machine; it came at a cost of $50,000 and one part-time employee was hired to operate the machine.

On July 23, 1962, WCCO-TV was involved in the world's first live international broadcast via the Telstar satellite; the station's mobile units provided the feed for all three networks, ABC, CBS, and NBC, for a program originating from native land in the Black Hills showing Mount Rushmore to the world.

During the fall of 1979, WCCO-TV and radio experienced a labor dispute when the International Brotherhood of Electrical Workers (IBEW), the union representing many of the stations' technical and production personnel, went on strike. Despite the walkout, the stations maintained their daily broadcast schedules, using non-striking employees, including management and news personnel, to cover the essential functions. For WCCO-TV, this meant that news director Ron Handberg and anchor Skip Loescher were notably involved in producing and presenting the news, as seen in broadcasts from the period.

The "Circle 4" logo used by WCCO-TV from 1977 to 2000

In September 1983, WCCO relocated its operations from its original studios on South 9th Street to the present location at South 11th Street and Nicollet Mall. The network gained full ownership of WCCO-TV in 1992, when it acquired what was by then known as Midwest Communications. In 2000, Viacom bought CBS, and WCCO became part of the Viacom Television Stations Group. In 2006, Viacom Television Stations Group was renamed CBS Television Stations when Viacom split into two companies.

During the 1980s, a cable-exclusive sibling station was created to supplement WCCO, with its own slate of local and national entertainment programming. This was known as WCCO II, but by 1989, it had evolved into the Midwest Sports Channel, focusing on regional sporting events. It continued under CBS ownership until 2000, when it was announced that MSC and sibling RSN Home Team Sports were to be sold. HTS went to Comcast, while MSC was sold to Fox Entertainment Group and became Fox Sports North, a part of Fox Sports Net. MSC had been an FSN affiliate since 1997.

On February 2, 2017, CBS agreed to sell CBS Radio to Entercom, currently the fourth-largest radio broadcasting company in the United States. The sale was completed on November 17, 2017, and was conducted using a Reverse Morris Trust so that it was tax-free. While CBS shareholders retained a 72% ownership stake in the combined company, Entercom, now Audacy, is the surviving entity, with WCCO radio and its sibling stations separated from WCCO-TV.

On August 13, 2019, National Amusements announced that Viacom and CBS Corporation would recombine their assets, forming the entity ViacomCBS. The sale was completed on December 4, 2019, resulting in CBS Television Stations, including WCCO-TV, becoming subsidiaries of ViacomCBS. On February 16, 2022, ViacomCBS changed its name to Paramount Global.

On August 14, 2023, Wendy McMahon, a former creative services director at WCCO-TV, was named CBS News and Stations president.

== Programming ==
=== Sports programming ===
In 1961, with the establishment of the Minnesota Vikings of the National Football League, the station, via CBS, which held the rights to broadcast NFL games, became the 'unofficial' home station of the team. This partnership continued through the 1993 season, at which time most games were moved to WFTC. Today, most Vikings games are on KMSP-TV; since 1998, WCCO airs at least two Vikings games each season when the Vikings host an AFC team, or, since 2014, with the institution of the new 'cross-flex' rules, any games that are moved from KMSP-TV. In 1992, WCCO provided coverage of Super Bowl XXVI and that year's Final Four, which were hosted at the Hubert H. Humphrey Metrodome.

Since 2023, WCCO has aired select Minnesota Golden Gophers football games as a part of a new deal between CBS and the Big Ten Conference.

=== News operation ===
WCCO presently broadcasts 38 1/2 hours of locally produced newscasts each week (with 6 1/2 hours each weekday and three hours each on Saturdays and Sundays). WCCO leads the Twin Cities market in nearly all time slots, from its morning show to the 10 p.m. news. WCCO leads by large margins in overall households, though compared to the 25–54 demographic, the numbers are much more competitive with NBC affiliate KARE.

WCCO began broadcasting local newscasts in high-definition on May 28, 2009, becoming the third major network station in the Twin Cities (behind KARE and KMSP) to do so.

WCCO-TV launched a streaming news service, CBSN Minnesota (now CBS News Minnesota) on December 12, 2019, as part of a rollout of similar services (each a localized version of the national CBSN service across the CBS-owned stations).

On September 5, 2022, WCCO premiered an hour-long 4 p.m. newscast called The 4.

==== Notable former on-air staff ====
- Clellan Card – children's show personality "Axel" (1954–1966)
- Bill Carlson – entertainment reporter, midday news anchor
- Paul Douglas – chief meteorologist (1997–2008)
- Randi Kaye – news reporter, news anchor
- Bud Kraehling – weather anchor/staff announcer (1949–1996)
- Dave Moore – news anchor (1950s–1991)
- Barry Petersen – news reporter
- David Schechter – investigative reporter
- Hal Scott – sports anchor (1960s–1980)
- Don Shelby – news reporter/news anchor (1978–2010)
- Susan Spencer – news reporter, news anchor
- Bill Stewart – news reporter
- Michele Tafoya – sports anchor/sports reporter
- Heather Tesch – meteorologist
- Ben Tracy – news reporter

== Technical information ==
=== Subchannels ===
The stations' signals are multiplexed:

Subchannels of WCCO-TV and KCCW-TV
Subchannel		Res.	Short name		Programming
WCCO-TV	KCCW-TV	Res.	WCCO-TV	KCCW-TV	Programming
4.1	12.1	1080i	WCCO-DT	KCCW-DT	CBS
4.2	12.2	480i	WCCODT2	KCCWDT2	Start TV
4.3	12.3	480i	WCCODT3	KCCWDT3	Dabl
4.4	12.4	480i	WCCODT4	KCCWDT4	Outlaw
4.5	12.5	480i	WCCODT5	KCCWDT5	Nosey

=== Analog-to-digital conversion ===
WCCO-TV ended regular programming on its analog signal, over VHF channel 4, on June 12, 2009, the official date on which full-power television stations in the United States transitioned from analog to digital broadcasts under federal mandate. The station's digital signal remained on its pre-transition UHF channel 32, using virtual channel 4.

As part of the SAFER Act, WCCO-TV kept its analog signal on the air until July 12 to inform viewers of the digital television transition through a loop of public service announcements from the National Association of Broadcasters.

=== Satellite stations and translators ===
WCCO-TV operates a satellite station northwest of the Twin Cities area:

Station	City of license	Channel; TV (RF)	First air date	Former call letters	ERP	HAAT	Transmitter coordinates	Facility ID	Public license information
KCCW-TV	Walker	12 (12)	January 1, 1964	KNMT (1964–1987)	59 kW	286.4 m (940 ft)	46°56′5″N 94°27′20″W	9640	Public file LMS

It formerly operated a second satellite station:

Station	City of license	Channel; TV (RF)	First air date	Last air date	Former call letters	ERP	HAAT	Transmitter coordinates	Facility ID
KCCO-TV	Alexandria	7 (7)	October 8, 1958	December 30, 2017; (59 years, 83 days)	KCMT (1958–1987)	29 kW	339.6 m (1,114 ft)	45°41′10″N 95°8′4″W	9632

Both of these stations were founded by the Central Minnesota Television Company and maintained primary affiliations with NBC and secondary affiliations with ABC from their respective sign-ons until the summer of 1982, when both stations switched to CBS. KCMT had originally broadcast from a studio in Alexandria, with KNMT operating as a satellite station of KCMT. Central Minnesota Television sold both stations to Midwest Radio and Television in 1987, at which point they adopted their present call letters and became semi-satellites of WCCO-TV.

Until 2002, the two stations simulcast WCCO-TV's programming for most of the day, except for separate commercials and inserts placed into channel 4's newscasts. However, in 2002, WCCO-TV ended KCCO/KCCW's local operations and shut down the Alexandria studio, converting the two stations into full-time satellites. Since then, channel 4 has identified as "Minneapolis–St. Paul/Alexandria/Walker", with virtually no on-air evidence that KCCO and KCCW were separate stations.

CBS sold KCCO's spectrum in the FCC's spectrum incentive auction, but was expected to engage in a channel-sharing agreement. In a request for a waiver of requirements that KCCO broadcast public service announcements related to the shutdown (as the station no longer had the capability to originate separate programming, such announcements would also need to air on WCCO-TV and KCCW-TV despite not being relevant outside of KCCO's viewing area; CBS inserted a crawl at the KCCO transmitter for broadcast every fifteen minutes), CBS disclosed that KCCO would shut down December 30, 2017. WCCO-TV remains available on cable and satellite providers in the Alexandria area; Selective TV, Inc., a local translator collective, announced on December 22, 2017, that it had struck a deal to add WCCO to its lineup.

==== Translators ====
In addition, the broadcast signal of WCCO-TV is extended by way of eight translators:

- K22DV-D Alexandria (translates WCCO-TV)
- K33DB-D Alexandria (translates WCCO-TV)
- K35IU-D Frost (translates WCCO-TV)
- K35IZ-D Jackson (translates WCCO-TV)
- K18IR-D Olivia (translates WCCO-TV)
- K22MF-D Red Lake (translates KCCW-TV)
- K33LB-D Redwood Falls (translates WCCO-TV)
- K33OT-D Willmar (translates WCCO-TV)
