= St. Paul Pioneer Press =

Newspaper based in St. Paul, Minnesota

Coordinates: 44°56′33″N 93°05′00″W

Pioneer Press
- The July 27, 2005, front page of the Pioneer Press
- Type: Daily newspaper
- Format: Broadsheet
- Owner: Digital First Media (Alden Global Capital)
- Publisher: Greg Mazanec
- Editor: Mike Burbach
- Founded: 1849
- Headquarters: 10 River Park Plaza, 7th Floor; Saint Paul, Minnesota 55101; USA
- Circulation: 15,700 Average Print Circulation
- ISSN: 0892-1083
- OCLC number: 48259426
- Website: twincities.com

The St. Paul Pioneer Press is a newspaper based in Saint Paul, Minnesota, United States. It serves the Minneapolis–Saint Paul metropolitan area. Circulation is heaviest in the east metro, including Ramsey, Dakota, and Washington counties, along with western Wisconsin, eastern Minnesota and Anoka County, Minnesota. The paper's main rival is the Star Tribune, based in neighboring Minneapolis. The Pioneer Press is owned by MediaNews Group, controlled by Alden Global Capital. It no longer includes "St. Paul" as part of its name in either its print or online edition, but its owner still lists the paper's name as the St. Paul Pioneer Press and the paper also calls itself the St. Paul Pioneer Press on its Facebook and Twitter pages. Its URL and digital presence is TwinCities.com.

== History ==
A St. Paul Sunday Pioneer Press front page dated August 12, 1945, featuring the first publication of the mushroom cloud during the atomic bombing of Hiroshima, Japan.

The Pioneer Press traces its history to both the Minnesota Pioneer, Minnesota's first daily newspaper (founded in 1849 by James M. Goodhue), and the Saint Paul Dispatch (launched in 1868). Ridder Publications acquired the Pioneer and the Dispatch in 1927. Ridder merged with Knight Publications to form Knight Ridder in 1974. The two papers were operated for many years as separate morning and evening papers, but in 1985 were merged into the all-day publication the St. Paul Pioneer Press and Dispatch, which later dropped the "and" from "and Dispatch" in 1986, simply becoming the St. Paul Pioneer Press Dispatch. The publication eventually made the transition to a morning-only paper, and on March 26, 1990, the word "Dispatch" was dropped. The paper is sometimes called the "Pi Press", just as "Strib" is used for the Star Tribune.

During World War II the paper had war correspondents in the field. There were 30 correspondents from various papers at Iwo Jima, including A.J. Crocker of the Pioneer Press.

From 1947 to 1949, the newspaper printed the comic strip Li'l Folks, by Twin Cities native Charles M. Schulz. This comic introduced a number of characters who would later return in 1950 in the syndicated comic strip Peanuts, including Charlie Brown and a dog strongly resembling Snoopy.

In 1952, the Dispatch began sponsoring a treasure hunt as part of the Saint Paul Winter Carnival. Clues to finding a medallion are printed in the paper, and the first person to find and return it with the clues and a registered carnival button wins a sum of money. The prize started off at $1,000 and as of 2004 rose to $10,000.

The paper has won three Pulitzer Prizes: in 1986, 1988, and 2000.

On March 10, 1999, the day before the University of Minnesota men's basketball team was to begin play in the NCAA Tournament, the Pioneer Press published a story written by George Dohrmann with allegations that a staffer wrote coursework for many Minnesota basketball players within the past five years. Immediately, Minnesota suspended four players suspected of academic fraud, and in 2000, the NCAA vacated all postseason appearances by Minnesota from 1994 to 1998 and docked scholarships for four years, among other penalties. Dohrmann would win a Pulitzer Prize for beat reporting in 2000 for his reports on the scandal. Dohrmann and his editor prepared for hostile reactions to the newspaper from the local community. Minnesota governor Jesse Ventura accused the Pioneer Press of timing the article to be published around NCAA Tournament time for the sake of "sensationalism journalism", and the Pioneer Press got many hostile calls and letters in response to the story.

In 2004 the Pioneer Press made news itself. The great-great-grandson of George Thompson, a former owner/editor of the paper, took a 1914 pocket watch of his grandfather's to the Antiques Roadshow when it came to St. Paul. There he learned it was not ordinary, with an estimated value of $250,000. Afterward, the grandson sent the watch to Sotheby's, where it sold for $1.5 million. The Pioneer Press Patek Philippe is on display at the Patek Philippe Museum in Geneva. In 2020 the show updated its appraisal of the watch's value to $2–3 million.

The McClatchy Company acquired the paper in June 2006 when it bought Knight Ridder. As owner of the Star Tribune, McClatchy had to sell the Pioneer Press because of antitrust concerns. The Pioneer Press was subsequently sold by McClatchy to MediaNews Group later in the year.

The hedge fund Alden Global Capital now owns a controlling share of the Pioneer Press. In its operating year of 2017, The Pioneer Press under Alden announced a profit of $10 million with a 13% operating margin after Alden cut the newspaper's workforce to around 60 people. Alden has faced notable criticism for this from editorial staff of The Denver Post.

In 2006 the Pioneer Press had 206 reporters, copy-editors, and editors who were members of a union. By September 2023, that number had dropped to 29.

In 2025, the Pioneer Press indicated it would join the Star Tribune and outsource printing the paper to a plant in Iowa in 2026.

== Notable journalists ==
- Joseph H. Ball, who was a columnist for the Pioneer Press before becoming a Republican U.S. Senator for Minnesota
- Jacqui Banaszynski, writer, editor and winner of the 1988 Pulitzer Prize for Feature Writing.
- Jim Caple
- Nick Coleman
- George Dohrmann, winner of the 2000 Pulitzer Prize for beat reporting, for stories about the University of Minnesota basketball scandal.
- Dick Gordon
- Herb Greenberg
- Deborah Howell, executive editor and vice president who died in 2010.
- Mark Kellogg, the first Associated Press correspondent to die in the line of duty when he was killed at the Battle of the Little Bighorn.
- Katherine Lanpher, columnist and later co-host of The Al Franken Show
- James Lileks
- Robert Ridder, former reporter, later a director for Knight Ridder.
- Don Riley, sportswriter
- Jim Romenesko, Internet reporter for the Pioneer Press from 1996 to 1999, now blogger at JimRomenesko.com
- John Sandford/John Camp, author of the Prey series of crime novels and winner of the 1986 Pulitzer Prize for Feature Writing.
- Joe Soucheray, general columnist and host of the KSTP afternoon program, Garage Logic.
- Charley Walters, sports columnist

== Gallery ==
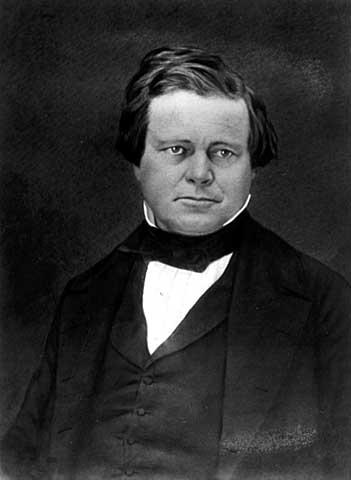
James. M. Goodhue

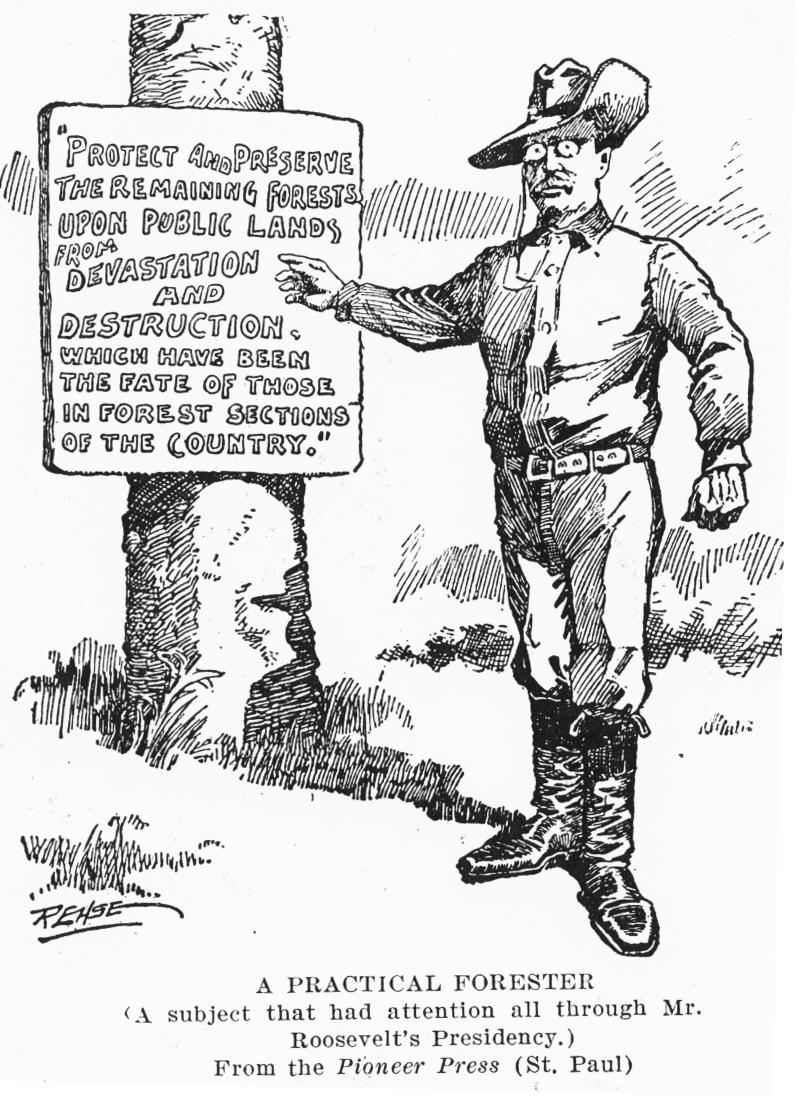
1908 US editorial cartoon on Theodore Roosevelt and conservation

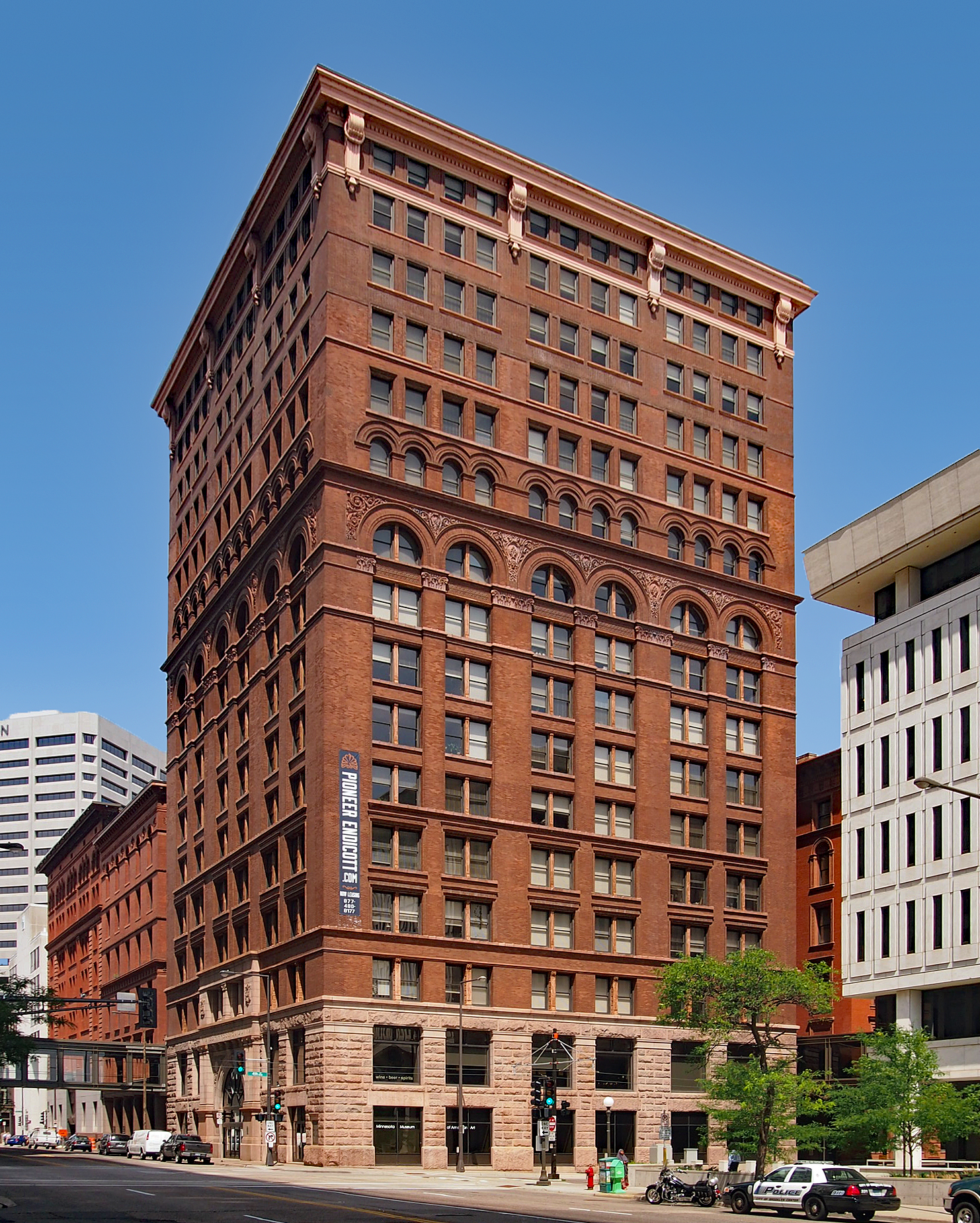
Pioneer Press building

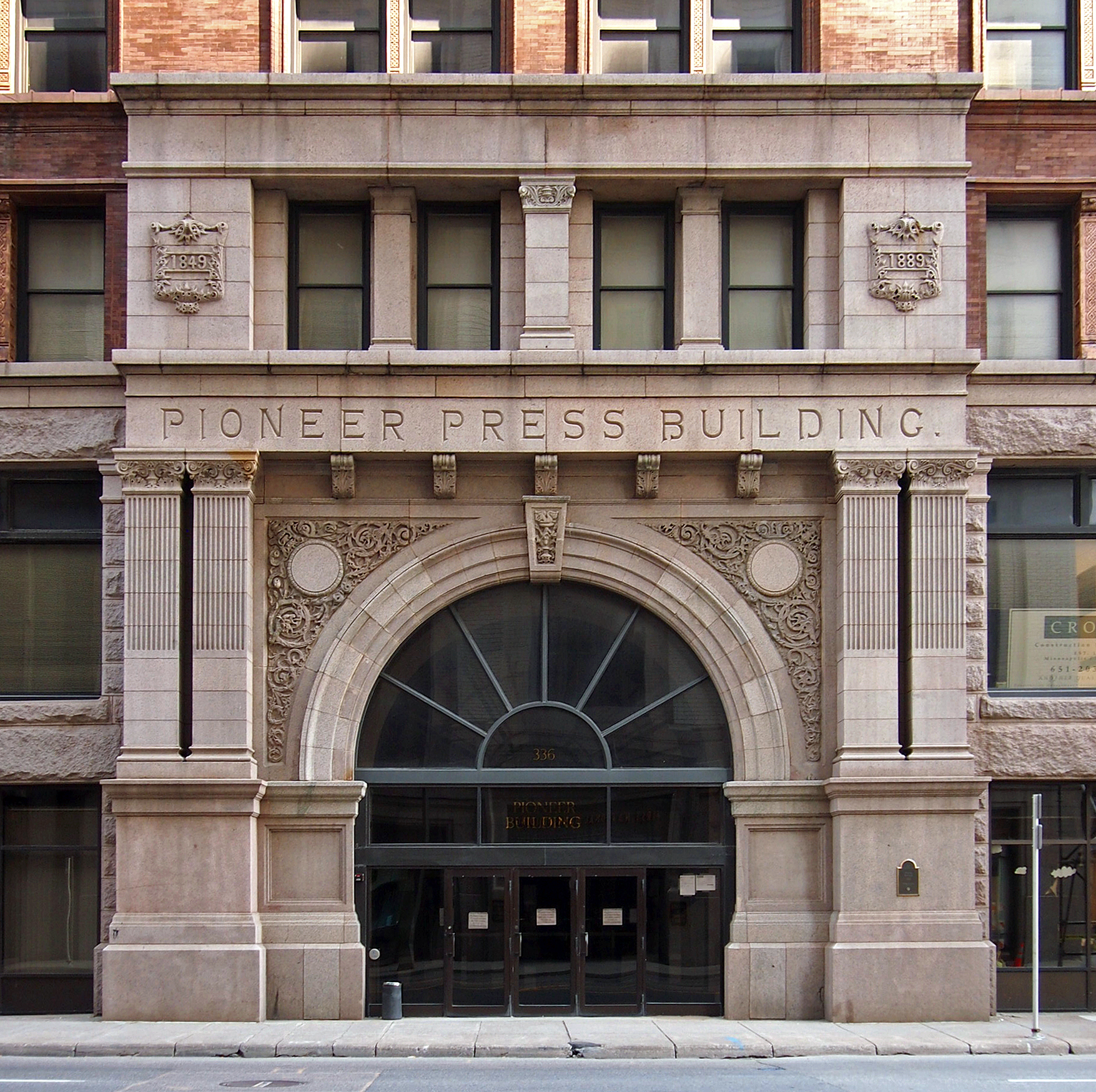
Pioneer Press building main entrance

== See also ==
- List of newspapers in Minnesota
- Defunct newspapers of Minnesota
