= 2020 notable events in American television =

The following is a list of notable events in American television in 2020.

== January ==
Date	Event	Source
1	FuboTV drops the Fox Sports Networks after failing to reach a deal with the regional network group's owners, the Sinclair Broadcast Group/Entertainment Studios joint venture Diamond Sports Group. Representatives with the virtual MVPD service stated that the decision was based on the rates "not being consistent with its mission to provide value and keep costs low to consumers". The move comes a day after FuboTV dropped Disney-owned entertainment networks FX, FXX, FXM and National Geographic, citing concerns over the cost of the full Disney networks bundle resulting in increased subscriber rates.	
3	Hearst Television removed its 34 stations from AT&T's pay television services (DirecTV, AT&T U-verse and AT&T TV Now) at 3:00 p.m. EST that afternoon, after failing to come to terms on a new retransmission consent agreement, affecting viewers in 26 television markets. The dispute is settled in less than two days for undisclosed terms.	
5	The 77th Golden Globe Awards airs on NBC, hosted by Ricky Gervais for the fifth time. In television, Succession, Fleabag, and Chernobyl were the most awarded, with two awards each. Among television performers, Succession's Brian Cox and The Crown's Olivia Colman won actor and actress honors for Best Performance in a Television Series – Drama, while Ramy's Ramy Youssef and Fleabag's Phoebe Waller-Bridge each received honors for Best Performance in a Television Series – Musical or Comedy.	
6–10	As long-time host Pat Sajak continues to recover from last November's intestine surgery, his daughter, country singer Maggie Sajak, co-hosts Wheel of Fortune this week, turning letters while Vanna White continues to fill in for him.	
7	Gray Television, owners of CBS/Fox/CW+ affiliate WAGM-TV in Presque Isle, Maine, finally signs-on WWPI-LD, giving Presque Isle its first full-time NBC affiliate. This leaves Alpena, Michigan as the sole remaining market in the United States without a locally-based NBC affiliate until January 24, 2022 when CBS/Fox/ABC affiliate WBKB-TV, the only over-the-air commercial station in the market, begins broadcasting NBC programming on DT2.	
7–14	Brad Rutter, Ken Jennings, and James Holzhauer play against each other in the Jeopardy! The Greatest of All Time tournament, a prime time special which aired on ABC. Jennings won the tournament and its $1 million prize after winning the fourth game of the tournament (based on a three-game win structure), eventually regaining the honor on the largest winnings record in the history of American television for the first time since Rutter retook the title back in 2014. It also marked the first time both Jennings and Rutter amassed more than $5 million total in terms of their overall game show winnings.	
10	Disney Channel premieres one of the most popular animated series of all time, The Owl House.	
14	CNN and its political correspondent Abby Phillip receive criticism from supporters of Bernie Sanders as well as some media outlets (among them, political talk hosts long criticized by progressives for coverage slanted against Sanders) and journalism organizations (such as the Poynter Institute, which called the moment "stunning in its ineptness, and stunning in its unprofessionalism") for a question Phillip asked during the seventh Democratic presidential debate. The question appeared to dismiss or imply lack of believability of Sanders's denial of a January 13 story by CNN, which claimed that he had told fellow progressive candidate Elizabeth Warren, who asserted validity to the claim despite lack of evidence, that a woman could not win the presidential election during a meeting with her in 2018. Sanders stated the conversation had touched upon the role sexism would play in the 2020 presidential campaign, specifically regarding President Donald Trump's history of verbal attacks against female politicians including Warren; Sanders's campaign alleged Warren and her staff had embellished the details of the discussion. Warren and Sanders were also caught on a hot mic accusing each other of lying on national television.	
15	Nexstar Media Group announces plans to launch a three-hour, nightly prime time newscast on its recently acquired cable channel WGN America. The program, titled "News Nation", will be based out of the studios of Nexstar-owned WGN-TV/Chicago, compiling reports from that station and the group's 109 other local news operations nationwide into a cohesive program featuring straight news and feature reporting. (News Nation will be the first national newscast to air on WGN America since the then-superstation feed of WGN-TV carried the similarly formatted 1980–90 syndicated program Independent Network News, distributed by former parent Tribune Broadcasting.)	
18	After 30 years, Hank Azaria announces he will no longer voice The Simpsons character Apu Nahasapeemapetilon. This comes after the 2017 documentary The Problem with Apu by comedian Hari Kondabolu in which he claimed the show portrayed "outdated" Indian American cultural stereotypes, racial microaggressions and slurs.	
18	Cox Media Group removes stations in ten markets (all affected stations were formerly owned by Northwest Broadcasting) from Dish Network and Sling TV at 7:00 p.m. EST that evening, after failing to come to terms on a new retransmission consent agreement. Dish alleges that Cox Media parent Apollo Global Management was seeking to increase its retransmission payments by double the amount they were receiving and had turned down an offer to extend the existing agreement, specifically to allow viewers in Binghamton (WICZ-TV), Syracuse (WSYT), Medford (KMVU-DT), Spokane (KAYU-TV) and Tri-Cities–Yakima (KFFX-TV/KCYU-LD) to watch Fox's coverage of the January 19 NFC Championship Game and Super Bowl LIV on February 2. Dish was also granted a temporary restraining order to prevent a blackout involving the 14 Cox Media stations that Apollo jointly owns with Cox Enterprises, despite a multi-year agreement covering those stations it signed in 2019. On March 16, 2020, all Cox signals are restored to Dish through a mutual agreement in order to disseminate coronavirus news and information, though a new retransmission agreement remains unsigned.	
21	CMT launches an "equal play" initiative in which, effective immediately, songs by female country music artists will be guaranteed to make up 50% of the videos featured as part of the network's overnight and morning music video blocks. (CMT estimates that it previously offered a 40/60 ratio of music videos featuring female artists compared to those by male artists, itself a larger share of female-led songs than averaged to receive airplay on country radio stations nationwide [accounting for 13% of songs played].) The move is praised by veteran female music artists in the genre (including Sheryl Crow, Brandi Carlile and Mickey Guyton) and listeners, while some country fans on social media criticized the move to suggest videos would be based on gender instead of song quality.	
26	The 62nd Grammy Awards—held at the Staples Center in Los Angeles—aired on CBS with Alicia Keys as the host. Billie Eilish (alongside her brother, songwriter/producer Finneas O'Connell) received the most Grammys, with five wins each, becoming the first artist to win Record of the Year, Album of the Year, Song of the Year, and Best New Artist in the same year since Christopher Cross in 1981. In light of the death of retired Los Angeles Lakers shooting guard Kobe Bryant (whose former team uses the Staples Center as its home venue) in a helicopter crash that morning, several tributes to Bryant were featured during the telecast, including a performance of Boyz II Men's "It's So Hard to Say Goodbye to Yesterday" by Keys and group members Shawn Stockman, Wanya and Nathan Morris, while Lil Nas X (who won two awards), Lizzo (who won three awards) and DJ Khaled included tributes to Bryant within their performances. The telecast was watched by 18.7 million people, the lowest amount in 12 years.	
26	In reporting on the aforementioned death of Kobe Bryant, MSNBC anchor Alison Morris referred to the basketball star's former team as the "Los Angeles Nakers". Morris claims she misspoke, combining the Lakers' team nickname with that of the New York Knicks. However, the slip-up led to accusations that Morris used a racial epithet and calls for her firing.	
27	Sinclair Broadcast Group discloses through an SEC filing that it reached a $60-million cash and asset settlement with Nexstar Media Group pertaining to a lawsuit filed in concurrence with the August 2018 termination of the deal by Tribune Media (which merged with Nexstar in September 2019) over its aborted 2017 purchase by Sinclair. Tribune terminated the deal after the FCC designated it for hearing by an administrative judge over concerns about Sinclair's proposed sales of Tribune stations in certain markets (including those where Sinclair had existing station properties) to sidecar licensees in an attempt to comply with FCC national and local ownership rules. Through the settlement, Nexstar will acquire Fox affiliate WDKY-TV/Lexington, Kentucky and certain non-license assets of KGBT-TV/Harlingen, Texas from Sinclair (which will remain owner of the latter's license but relinquished its programming inventory—including its CBS affiliation—to Nexstar-owned NBC affiliate and new outsourcing agreement partner KVEO-TV on January 28), and modifications will be made to Nexstar's affiliation agreements with Sinclair multicast networks Comet and TBD (which Nexstar largely inherited through the Tribune purchase).	
27	Ion Media announces its purchase of Azteca América affiliate KMCC/Laughlin, Nevada from Entravision Communications for a yet-disclosed price. The deal—which will give the company 71 full-power stations in 62 markets (including 41 based in the 50 largest markets)—will give Ion a Las Vegas-area O&O for its flagship network Ion Television (which has been affiliated locally with KBLR-DT3 since 2016 through an agreement with station parent NBCUniversal's Telemundo Station Group unit) and sister properties Ion Plus and Qubo (neither of which have local broadcast carriage). It will also break up a duopoly formed between KMCC and Univision affiliate KINC in 2018 (by way of Entravision's purchase of KMCC from Cranston Acquisition LLC in March 2017).	
28	ABC affiliate KVII-TV/Amarillo fires morning anchor Anthony Pittman following his January 24 arrest in Randall County, Texas on solicitation and prostitution charges, a class B misdemeanor which carries a 180-day jail sentence and a $2,000 fine. The Sinclair Broadcast Group station also removed his profile from the website the same day. Pittman had worked at KVII since 2013 and prior to that was a fixture as a sports reporter at Fox-affiliated sister station KABB/San Antonio from 2000 to 2010.	
29	Winemiller Television, LLC announces it will sell WSCG/Baxley–Savannah to Tri-State Christian Television affiliate company Radiant Life Ministries for $3 million. The sale follows Winemiller's failed sale of the station—a primary Heroes & Icons affiliate with 11 additional subchannel services (including Ion Television, Court TV Mystery, HSN and Cozi TV)—to HC2 Broadcasting in November 2019. Upon completion, the station will likely become the Savannah market's first full-power religious station as an O&O of the religious TCT Network.	
29	ABC News suspends chief national correspondent Matt Gutman over a false statement he made on-air on January 26 following the death of Kobe Bryant, where Gutman had erroneously reported that all four of Bryant's daughters were on board the helicopter that crashed into the hills of Calabasas, California in a breaking news report aired after the start of the 2020 Pro Bowl. Bryant's other three children were not on board the aircraft with their father and 13-year-old sister Gianna, who also perished; Gutman would later apologize for the error. In a statement from ABC News, "Reporting the facts accurately is the cornerstone of our journalism... "As he acknowledged on Sunday, Matt Gutman's initial reporting was not accurate and failed to meet our editorial standards."	
30	Sony closes its virtual MVPD television service, PlayStation Vue, after under five years of operation. Increasing carriage costs for broadcast and cable-originated networks are blamed by the company for Vue's closure.	
31	Zap2it (which has been owned by Nexstar since its acquisition of Tribune in September 2019) discontinues updates of its TV By the Numbers website after over a decade in operation.	

== February ==
Date	Event	Source
2	The Kansas City Chiefs defeated the San Francisco 49ers, 31–20, to win Super Bowl LIV, which aired live from Hard Rock Stadium in Miami Gardens, Florida on Fox (English) and Fox Deportes (Spanish). Singers Jennifer Lopez and Shakira headlined the halftime show. 102 million viewers watched the telecast across Fox's broadcast and digital properties, and the NFL and Verizon's respective digital properties, up slightly from the cumulative 100.7 million that watched 2019's Super Bowl LIII; accounting only for network viewership, Super Bowl LIV was watched by 99.9 million viewers (a 41.6 rating) on Fox and 757,000 viewers on Fox Deportes. An investigation by WFAA/Dallas-Fort Worth later found that viewers filed more than 1,300 complaints to the Federal Communications Commission over the content of the halftime show, which included suggestive dancing by the performers. This would be the sixth and final Super Bowl called by Joe Buck and Troy Aikman, as they would move to ESPN after the 2021 season and over twenty seasons with Fox.	
3	LBI Media rebrands as Estrella Media, borrowing its new name from flagship Spanish-language network Estrella TV. The move is part of a corporate reorganization through its October 2019 emergence from Chapter 11 bankruptcy protection that saw company founder Lenard Liberman divest his equity in the company.	
4	Alphabet Inc. announces the discontinuation of the Google Fiber IPTV service to new customers after under nine years of operation in order to focus on the provider's gigabit-based broadband Internet service. The company will transition customers to YouTube TV or competing virtual MVPD fuboTV as part of a new partnership with Google. Existing customers will still have access to the Google Fiber IPTV service for the foreseeable future.	
4	CBS News releases an excerpt from an interview in which Gayle King asks Lisa Leslie whether rape allegations made against Kobe Bryant complicated the recently passed NBA star's legacy. After facing criticism from 50 Cent, Snoop Dogg and other social media users, King blamed CBS for selecting a "salacious" portion of the interview to share without context. For its part, the network said that the excerpt was not reflective of the "thoughtful, wide-ranging interview" that King had conducted.	
4	President Trump delivers the 2020 State of the Union Address, along with associated coverage.	
8	ESPN basketball analyst Barry Booker receives criticism for referring to female gymnasts as "scantily clad girls" in a sidebar with lead announcer Richard Cross—both of whom were presiding over that night's college basketball game between the Arkansas Razorbacks and the Missouri Tigers—while promoting SEC Network's February 14 telecast of an Alabama–Arkansas women's gymnastics meet. ESPN, the Southeastern Conference and former Arkansas gymnast Sydney McGlone (the latter of whom noted the remark sexualized gymnastics as the sport continues to deal with sexual abuse scandals involving trainers and physicians of gymnasts at the collegiate and professional levels) denounced Booker's comments; Booker later apologized for the remark.	
9	The 92nd Academy Awards, presented from the Dolby Theatre in Hollywood, airs on ABC. This was the second consecutive year that the broadcast did not have a host. The South Korean-language comedy thriller Parasite made history, winning for Best Picture, Best International Feature Film, Best Director and Best Original Screenplay, becoming the first South Korean film to receive Academy Award recognition, as well as the first film not in the English language to win Best Picture. Netflix, which set a record for having the most nominations from a streaming service and studio with 24, surpassing the 15 it received for the previous year's event, took home only two; its heavily touted The Irishman, which was nominated in ten categories, was shut out in every single one. Meanwhile, just two days prior to the airing of the event, AMPAS and ABC came under fire for rejecting a commercial for Frida Mom which depicted a postpartum mother changing her own, visibly wet, absorbent pad in the middle of the night; the academy felt it was too graphic to air during the telecast, citing guidelines laid out in AMPAS that state that, among other items, "feminine hygiene products (and) adult diapers" could not be advertised on the telecast. The rejection sparked outrage from women's groups and from Busy Philipps, who posted the rejected ad on her Instagram account. Ratings wise, this telecast would average at least 23.6 million viewers and a 5.3 rating among the key ad-sales demo of adults 18–49, down 20 percent year-over-year in viewers and 31 percent in adults 18–49.	
11	The Conners aired a special live episode the night of the New Hampshire primary on ABC, which incorporated voting results reported by ABC News as they became available into the storyline. The episode was performed twice for Eastern/Central and Pacific Time viewers, the latter of which aired as Bernie Sanders was projected as the primary's winner, finishing at a 1.4 percentage point margin ahead of Pete Buttigieg, and was delayed two minutes—starting less than 10 seconds before the cast was set to start performing that version—to allow a live election update.	
12	Altice USA announces its intent to acquire the Sussex County and northern Warren County, New Jersey operations of telecommunications provider Service Electric for $150 million. The deal—which does not include Service Electric's systems in eastern Pennsylvania, and Hunterdon and southern Warren counties in New Jersey, which will continue to be owned by the children of company founder John Walson Sr.—is expected to be completed in the early fall of 2020.	
12	Former National Hockey League player Jeremy Roenick announces via Twitter that he had been terminated by NBC Sports as an analyst on their NHL coverage two months after an appearance on a Barstool Sports podcast in which he made inappropriate comments about wife and NBC colleague Kathryn Tappen, and fellow NBC NHL analyst Patrick Sharp.	
17	The Price Is Right suspends production for the week following the death of host Drew Carey's former fiancé, family/sex therapist Amie Harwick, who died from injuries sustained in a fall off a balcony, allegedly at the hands of ex-boyfriend Gareth Pursehouse, against whom Harwick had a restraining order that expired one week prior to her death. Harwick and Carey began dating in 2017, and were engaged from January 2018 until calling off their engagement in November 2019.	
20	ViacomCBS unveils plans to expand flagship SVOD service CBS All Access—which offers mainly original content, and CBS's current and library programs—later in the year, incorporating movies and TV series from Paramount Pictures and CBS Television Distribution's respective libraries, programming from the company's cable networks (including MTV, Nickelodeon [which already supplies some programming to CBSAA], Comedy Central, BET and Smithsonian Channel), and expanded live news and sports offerings. ViacomCBS plans to maintain its other existing ad-supported and subscription streaming services—focusing primarily on a service tier encompassing Pluto TV (which will continue operating as a standalone service available for free to existing users, while incorporating some of its curated channels onto CBSAA's platform), CBS All Access and the Showtime OTT service (which was not confirmed to be available as a CBSAA add-on, despite initial reports on the relaunch plans suggesting so)—while marketing the new CBS All Access to users of the other services.	
22	Following Bernie Sanders' wide-margin win in the Nevada Democratic caucuses that night, MSNBC anchor Chris Matthews faces criticism (including from fellow contributor Anand Giridharadas) and calls for his resignation and firing over remarks comparing Sanders' win to Nazi Germany's invasion of the Ardennes and the Low Countries of France in May 1940. The remarks occurred as Sanders, members of his campaign staff and other progressives have expressed discontent over MSNBC's negative coverage of Sanders and his supporters (including by Sanders himself to network president Phil Griffin, who was later reported to be considering pivoting its coverage in order to reflect Sanders' front-runner status in the primaries), with many critics noting that the remarks were particularly offensive given Sanders—who is Jewish—had lost most of his antecedent family members in the Holocaust. Matthews apologized during the February 24 edition of Hardball, describing the invasion reference as a "bad" analogy and stating he would try to do a better job discussing Sanders' candidacy during the campaign season.	
22	The 51st NAACP Image Awards are held in the Pasadena Civic Auditorium.	
24	In a television first, The Tonight Show Starring Jimmy Fallon records an entire episode from a moving train, a New York City Subway F train, capped by a performance from South Korean boy band BTS inside Grand Central Terminal.	
25	Searchlight Capital and fledgling investment firm ForgeLight announce their acquisition of Saban Capital Group, Madison Dearborn Partners and Providence Equity Partners's combined 64% majority interest in Univision Communications (owner of namesake flagship network Univision, UniMás and their 65 respective O&O stations, and cable networks like Galavisión, TUDN and Fusion TV) for an undisclosed sum. Mexican media company and Univision program supplier Televisa will retain a 36% stake in the company. ForgeLight founder/CEO Wade Davis (who formed the company shortly after his December 2019 departure as Viacom CEO upon its re-merger with CBS) will succeed Vince Sadusky as Univision Communications's CEO upon the deal's closure.	
25	Comcast announces its intent to acquire AVOD streaming service Xumo—which will operate as an independent business within the Comcast Cable division upon closure—from Panasonic and Viant Technology for an undisclosed sum. The acquisition will likely see Xumo be used to market Xfinity and other Comcast services (such as programming from its cable networks, and upcoming streaming service Peacock), and provide infrastructure for Comcast's streaming VOD technology. The purchase comes as Comcast's NBCUniversal unit is also in discussions to purchase Walmart-owned VOD service Vudu.	
25	ABC News suspends correspondent David Wright and reassigns him from political reporting over non-neutral remarks he made in a video by conservative group Project Veritas, including criticism of its cross-promotion of ABC parent Disney's TV and film content (primarily on its overnight and morning news programs, Good Morning America, World News Now and America This Morning), and aspects of its White House and presidential campaign coverage. The suspension is criticized by fellow journalists due to Veritas' past reputation for trying to damage the careers of journalists investigating conservative causes as well as ongoing issues with mainstream news organizations restricting journalists' personal political opinions in the current political climate.	
28	CBS Television Studios and Jerry Bruckheimer Productions announce a temporary suspension of production of the 33rd season of The Amazing Race due to the COVID-19 pandemic in the United States that had recently spread into Europe. Filming had already been completed on the season's first three episodes (two of which were in the United Kingdom; while production planned to film the third leg in Sweden), after which all contestants and production staff were forced to return to the United States as a precautionary measure even though none of the personnel involved experienced any signs of the coronavirus.	
28	Telecommunications provider Cincinnati Bell, which serves mainly portions of the Cincinnati area and has offered IPTV service since 2009, announces its intent to merge with Toronto-based Brookfield Infrastructure Partners for $2.75 billion in stock and cash.	
28	Lead NFL on CBS analyst Tony Romo comes to terms with the network to remain the network's #1 play-by-play analyst with Jim Nantz, with a contract paying the former Dallas Cowboys quarterback $17 million annually over a minimum of three years, making Romo the highest-paid sports analyst in television history and keeping him within the ViacomCBS fold. ESPN had also sought Romo to move to their network as the two companies begin the process of renewing their NFL broadcast rights.	

== March ==
Date	Event	Source
2	AT&T expands distribution of its virtual MVPD service AT&T TV nationwide, after initially operating in five markets within its local telephone service territory. AT&T TV, which is sold on a contractual basis (at $50/month for its base package) similar to traditional multichannel television services, utilizes Android TV-based set-top boxes (which include streaming apps such as Netflix) that are rented to subscribers. Although initially sold as part of bundles with AT&T's internet services, with the national rollout, customers can subscribe without being subscribed to AT&T's internet or wireless telephone services and the service will not count against data caps set by the company. Coinciding with this, AT&T announced it was "wind[ing] down" its IPTV service AT&T U-verse, ceasing to accept new subscribers online and directing them to AT&T TV, and merging its social media accounts into those of AT&T TV. (U-verse TV will remain available to the service's existing subscribers and will continue to accept new subscribers only via telephone calls.)	
2	Chris Matthews announces his retirement from broadcasting and the ending of his 26-year run as host of MSNBC's Hardball. Matthews announced the decision in a five-minute opening of the show, then departed the Washington studio, leaving Steve Kornacki in New York to unexpectedly finish the show after it returned from commercial. The move came after weeks of listening to comments and feedback from viewers over remarks he made, especially about Bernie Sanders, for whom he apologized to after comparing his rise in the 2020 campaign to the German invasion of France, and his notable absence during the network's coverage of the South Carolina Democratic Primary on February 29, where reports surfaced that a female guest made claims that he attempted to sexually harass her. The series' hosting slot is left vacant with MSNBC reporters filling the role. Matthews' show aired over three of NBC's cable networks, launching on MSNBC predecessor America's Talking in 1994, then airing on CNBC from 1996 until 1999, with the remainder of its run being on MSNBC.	
2	On the same day that Fox cancelled the drama series Almost Family, a series of sexual assault allegations against actor Timothy Hutton (who played Leon Bechley, a fertility doctor whose actions brought together the rest of the show's lead characters) were revealed in a BuzzFeed News investigation, as a Canadian ex-model and child actor—who waited until 2019 to file the complaint—claimed that Hutton had raped her in 1983, when she was 14 years old, while he was working on the film Iceman in Vancouver; the victim alleges a friend of Hutton's watched the rape, before later also raping her. Hutton has denied the charges against him. Almost Family was unlikely to return in any case, as the low-rated and critically panned series quietly ended its first season with its finale being burned off on a Saturday night a week before.	
3	Nexstar Media Group announces it has completed deals to trade Fox-affiliated KCPQ and MyNetworkTV-affiliated KZJO in Seattle and Fox-affiliated WITI in Milwaukee to Fox Television Stations in exchange for Fox's Charlotte duopoly (WJZY and WMYT-TV) and cash. In Milwaukee, the sale returns WITI to the Fox portfolio after Local TV LLC purchased it and others from Fox in 2007, and finally gives Fox a longtime quest to enter the Seattle television market after six years, where it attempted to acquire a station (that would have stripped KCPQ of its affiliation) that lead to a standoff between Fox and then-owner Tribune Broadcasting that later resulted in a renewal deal for KCPQ and Fox abandoning the sale at the last minute.	
5	On the same day YouTube TV signed a long-term renewal deal with Fox Sports Networks joint-venture parent Diamond Sports Group (co-owned by Sinclair Broadcast Group and Entertainment Studios), the provider drops three of the group's regional sports networks, Fox Sports West, Prime Ticket and YES Network, which collectively hold rights to eight Los Angeles- and New York-based teams across the NBA, WNBA, NHL, Major League Soccer and Major League Baseball. The renewal for the 13 unaffected Fox Sports Networks services follows a temporary contract extension signed on February 28, during distribution negotiations between the companies, and amid Dish Network/Sling TV and FuboTV having dropped all of the group's networks—which hold the local rights to 43 teams across the NBA, NHL, and MLB—from their lineups.	
6	The government of Austin, Texas announces the cancellation of the 2020 edition of the South by Southwest conference (which was scheduled to be held from March 13 to March 22) due to the aforementioned Coronavirus pandemic, which had recently spread into the state of Texas. Prior to the announcement, the owners of certain streaming services (including Netflix, Apple TV+, and Amazon Prime Video) announced that they had pulled out of the conference, resulting in the cancellation of numerous television show and film premieres.	
6	According to a report by Reuters, Gray Television makes an offer to purchase Tegna Inc. at a price of $8.5 billion. Later in the day, Apollo Global Management matched Gray's offer at $20 per share in what would be an all-cash transaction, an offer matched by Allen Media Broadcasting on March 11. A successful bid by Gray would put the owner of mostly smaller-market stations in cities such as Dallas-Fort Worth, Denver, Washington, D.C., and its home-base of Atlanta, but would require Gray to sell stations in some markets, including Louisville and Columbia. Gray pulls the offer on March 19 after its stock price is halved due to coronavirus-related market volatility.	
10	The effects of the coronavirus pandemic continue to grow, especially for live and taped talk shows and upcoming series. 20th Century Fox Television shut down production on Fox's upcoming NeXt after a crew member came in contact with the coronavirus and might have affected other employees on the Chicago-based set, leaving a delay for the mid-season series possible despite much of its first season already being in the can. Dr. Phil and The Wendy Williams Show both then announce that their shows will now tape without audiences, with Williams especially vulnerable due to a number of recent health issues. The daytime series of ABC and Disney–ABC Domestic Television then followed suit, with Good Morning America, The View, Live with Kelly and Ryan, Tamron Hall and Strahan, Sara and Keke all now taping without studio audiences. Disney+ later announced that Marvel Studios' The Falcon and the Winter Soldier would shut down production in both Prague and Atlanta due to the outbreak until further notice, leaving its upcoming debut in question after it was announced for a 2020 debut on the streaming service.	
11	Riverdale suspends production during the 20th episode of its 22-episode season after production staff found out an undisclosed staffer with the Vancouver-based CW series had contact with a COVID-19 patient.	
11	CBS News and CBS Sports close their headquarters at the CBS Broadcast Center in New York City until the end of the week for disinfection, due to two positive COVID-19 diagnoses among their employees. Programs produced by those divisions will originate from outside New York until disinfection is completed; CBS Sports Network switched to carrying content from CBS Sports HQ (which was unaffected as that service operates from facilities in Stamford and Fort Lauderdale) in order to provide some non-live event programming to viewers, while CBSN switched to originating content from locally based CBSN services operated by CBS-owned stations. Fellow CBS O&Os WBZ-TV/Boston, KPIX-TV/San Francisco and KCBS-TV/Los Angeles also temporarily assert production responsibilities for WCBS-TV and CBSN New York's newscasts due to the disinfection, which also cause the prime time newscast WCBS has produced (since February) for CW O&O WUPA/Atlanta to be placed on a temporary hiatus. The CBS-syndicated Inside Edition is also forced from the CBS Broadcast Center, with the newsmagazine's March 12 and 13 editions being compiled from outside of New York and Deborah Norville performing hosting duties from her own kitchen. Operations at Broadcast Center begin resuming on March 14, with that day's edition of CBS This Morning Saturday originating there after the parent program broadcast from CBS News' Washington, D.C. studio since the disinfection began, only to resume largely originating elsewhere (with This Morning temporarily originating from the Late Show's Ed Sullivan Theater studio) as a precaution days later. (WCBS/CBSN New York and Inside Edition resumed limited production operations from Broadcast Center during the week of March 23.)	
11	The NBA suspends the remainder of its 2019–20 season "until further notice" after Utah Jazz center Rudy Gobert (and later on March 12, fellow player and shooting guard Donovan Mitchell) tested presumptive positive for the coronavirus, resulting in the cancellation—just prior to tip-off—of a game in which the Jazz were facing the host city Oklahoma City Thunder at Chesapeake Energy Arena (all personnel associated with the Jazz organization, as well as teams they played within the last 10 days [including the Thunder], are quarantined until they are cleared), effectively leaving a large scheduling hole for NBA TV, ESPN, TNT and the league's regional sports network partners. Ironically, two days earlier, Gobert jokingly touched equipment belonging to the media during a press conference after the Jazz's loss to the Toronto Raptors, along with reports from other players who came into contact with him, putting its last ten road games the Jazz played against its opponents in question due to the possibility of more people being infected through Gobert.	
12	Following the NBA's lead of the day prior, several other sports leagues across the United States announce a temporary suspension of play in an attempt to slow the spread of the coronavirus. Major League Soccer suspends all games for 30 days, while the NHL announces an indefinite suspension of league activity, which was later followed in the day by Major League Baseball's announcement that it has suspended its spring training games and delayed the start of their 2020 regular season (originally scheduled to begin March 26) by at least two weeks. The suspension of the three leagues adds another large schedule void for NBC Sports, ESPN, Fox Sports, Univision, and the leagues' regional sports network partners. In addition, several NCAA basketball conference tournaments are canceled, including Division I basketball tournaments from the ACC, Big Ten, Big 12, Pac-12 and the SEC; the Big East was the only major NCAA athletic conference to initially go forward with that day's tournament play, before later canceling its tournament as well. Later that day, all scheduled NCAA tournaments for their winter and spring sports were canceled outright, including the men's and women's basketball tournaments which were set to be broadcast by CBS/Turner Sports and ESPN respectively. Later that evening officials with the PGA Tour announced that after the completion of The Players Championship it will cancel the next three events on the PGA Tour schedule, including the Valspar Championship, the WGC-Dell Technologies Match Play and the Valero Texas Open, emptying the schedule for Golf Channel; on March 13, the 2020 Masters Tournament would become the latest event to announce its postponement, yet another setback for ESPN and its international broadcasts partners. The revived XFL officially ended its season and canceled the remainder of its games. While they initially planned to return in 2021 and hold its championship game if conditions allowed, the league announced on April 10 that it was suspending operations indefinitely.	
12	The coronavirus pandemic results in three series produced by Universal Television — Netflix's Russian Doll, Apple TV+'s Little America and Peacock's Rutherford Falls — being postponed, leaving their future in question as they have yet to start production. Both Doll and America were scheduled to start their second season in 2020, while Falls is slated to debut this year. Hours later, another Apple TV+ series, The Morning Show, announces that it would suspend production on its second-season episodes as a precautionary measure, likewise for ABC's Grey's Anatomy, Amazon's Carnival Row, Apple TV+'s Foundation and Netflix's Grace and Frankie, which all shut down production on their shows. Anatomy was expected to be idle for two weeks but later announced that the April 9 episode will be the official season finale and will resume production in the Fall, while having a cast whose ages are at risk to contract the virus (most notably for Jane Fonda and Lily Tomlin) played a factor in Grace and Frankie's decision. Both Foundation and Carnival Row are being shot in Europe and have suspended filming indefinitely.	
12	Due to the statewide coronavirus pandemic in New York and a citywide emergency declaration by Mayor Bill de Blasio which closes Broadway theatres, NBC decides to record The Tonight Show with Jimmy Fallon without an audience (with a last minute appearance by Dr. Mehmet Oz, plus two other previously scheduled guests), with CBS also going without an audience for The Late Show with Stephen Colbert (which instead aired footage from rehearsal with Dr. Sanjay Gupta as his sole guest after Maria Bamford canceled), while Late Night with Seth Meyers only records an Internet-exclusive "A Closer Look" segment after that night's guests cancel. All three shows will go on hiatus starting March 16. Wendy also decides to stop taping altogether indefinitely, while Joy Behar (who, at 77, is within the 60+ age group of highest complication risk) will take a break from The View to avoid illness. The ban lasts until April 12 by order of Governor Andrew Cuomo as part of a statewide emergency declaration which disallows crowds of 500 or more people.	
12	Pop's One Day at a Time becomes the first prime-time multi-camera sitcom that will film episodes without an audience due to the coronavirus pandemic in the United States. Likewise, two Comedy Central shows: Lights Out with David Spade and Tosh.0, and MTV's Ridiculousness will shoot upcoming episodes without an audience. All shows are broadcast by cable networks owned by ViacomCBS and are shot in Los Angeles.	
13	CBS Television Studios stops production on several drama series as the coronavirus pandemic continues to become a serious issue, with their remaining episodes that were scheduled to be completed this season being pushed back and potentially causing implications pertaining to the May sweeps period. Among the affected series includes CBS' NCIS, NCIS: Los Angeles, NCIS: New Orleans, and Bull, The CW's Dynasty, and The Good Fight for CBS All Access. At the same time, the studio's multi-camera sitcom The Neighborhood was scheduled shoot its last episode of the season without a studio audience, but later announced that it would scrap those plans. The CW also announced that it would be delaying the final episodes of Supernatural just as they are in post production. The move comes just a day after two major studios started placing a hold on all production.	
13	Universal makes an announcement that production on more than 35 shows and a handful of pilots produced by the studio are either being postponed or delayed due to the crisis. Hours after CBS' announcement, two more followed suit: WarnerMedia's entertainment units (which includes Warner Bros. Television, Warner Bros. Television Distribution, and DC Entertainment) and Sony Pictures Television placed all their current and upcoming shows on ice. Later in the day, Apple TV+ halts all production on its series until further notice, followed by news that a series of emergency declarations have resulted in more television series and upcoming projects across the board in both the United States and Canada being ordered by networks (like Netflix and FX) and studios to shut down immediately, putting an array of programs with upcoming seasons like Stranger Things and Fear The Walking Dead in limbo and leaving an uncertain future as to when they will resume production.	
13	Disney's television unit (ABC Studios, Walt Disney Television, Marvel Studios and 20th Century Fox Television) also halts or delays production on 16 shows that are currently in production or had been green lighted to protect staff from contracting the coronavirus. Among the shows affected are ABC's Jimmy Kimmel Live!—which previously intended to continue production absent a live studio audience—which will go on hiatus until March 30, and General Hospital—the first soap opera and the first daytime network program to suspend production over coronavirus concerns—which is currently expected to resume production until April 10. In the latter case, although its episodes are taped only one month ahead of their initial broadcast, the network does not anticipate interruptions in General Hospital's airing schedule.	
13	Fox Business Network announces it has placed Bulls & Bears, Trish Regan Primetime and Kennedy on hiatus during the coronavirus pandemic. Comments made by Regan calling the COVID-19 pandemic a scheme by the Democratic Party and the media to discredit President Donald Trump (echoing a statement he first made two weeks prior at a campaign rally before he deflected the comments to make it look like it was made up by Democrats and media, not him) led to her placement on hiatus, while Kennedy was reassigned to assist in further network coverage of the pandemic. On March 27, the network announced that it has cancelled Trish Regan Primetime and parted ways with Regan. Though Kennedy was uninvolved in any way with Regan's controversy, her show remained on hiatus, and she continued to commentate on other Fox News/Business shows. Fox Business later announces the return of Kennedy in the former Regan slot on October 19, with Bulls & Bears still scheduled to return at a later date.	
14	Due to the coronavirus pandemic that resulted in the shutdown of television production, America Ferrera, who on February 28 announced that she would be leaving her role as both star and producer on Superstore, confirms that her last episode that was scheduled for April 16, in which her character Amy Sosa will make an exit from Cloud 9 after working there for over 10 years, will not go into production and will have only 21 episodes completed, short of the 22 ordered. Instead, her departure will occur in the next season on the November 5 episode, when the NBC workplace sitcom reaches its 100th episode, which would allow a closure for the character to take place and leave a door open for Ferrera to make recurring appearances. Superstore joins a list of series with unfinished episode orders (American Housewife with a couple left that might be scrapped), let alone a scheduled season date that could be pushed back (Queen of the South, The Resident and Pose are in the same dilemma), while producers working on the final season of Empire announces that it would not complete all of its episode orders and confirmed that its 18th episode (which will include scenes from an unfinished 19th episode) scheduled to air on April 21 will be the last but left open room for a proper ending in the future.	
15	More television series announce that the continuation of the coronavirus pandemic has forced them to shut down indefinitely with no timetable as to when they will complete or start their upcoming season, let alone return to production. At MGM Television, Elisabeth Moss has confirmed that her directorial and starring duties on the upcoming fourth season of Hulu's The Handmaid's Tale is being postponed and a few completed episodes may not air until later or held back for the following year, which is also being played out over at the studio's other series, leaving uncertainty for Fargo and Survivor. HBO also placed a pair of its news/discussion programs on indefinite hiatus: Bill Maher announces that his March 13 airing of Real Time with Bill Maher was the last one until the crisis dies down, while Last Week Tonight with John Oliver's broadcast on this date—which was moved to a stand-in studio instead of the CBS Broadcast Center, due to the aforementioned temporary shutdown of that building—will be a shortened episode before going on hiatus. A planned no-audience taped episode for the eighth-season finale of Last Man Standing is scrapped as is further production on The Orville, the latter delaying its third season return on its new home at Hulu.	
16	NBC orders Today co-anchors Al Roker and Craig Melvin to quarantine and all members of its third-hour editorial team to work from home after a staffer for the morning show's third hour working at 30 Rockefeller Plaza tested positive for the novel coronavirus. NBC News President Noah Oppenheim emailed employees the day prior to inform them that the unnamed staffer was receiving medical care for "mild symptoms" and division staff will identify personnel who had close contact with the employee for self-isolation. As a precaution, main co-anchors Savannah Guthrie (who would anchor the program from home two days later due to a potentially unrelated illness) and Hoda Kotb exercised social distancing practices for the first two hours of the program, sitting four feet apart from one another to limit potential contact.	
16	Following General Hospital's lead, the three other daytime serials, CBS' The Young and the Restless and The Bold and the Beautiful, and NBC's Days of Our Lives, all announced that they will suspend production due to the coronavirus pandemic. The CBS serials will go into repeats features fan-favorite storylines starting April 27 until an announcement is made regarding continued production. In the case of Days, the recently renewed soap opera, which was supposed to start production on new episodes at the end of March, will wait until further notice to resume, but has enough taped episodes to last until October as it has a wider tape-to-broadcast window (roughly seven to eight months) out of the four network soaps. Days also has a larger number of cast members and principal staff in the 60+ age group of highest complication risk (among them, 14 of its main and recurring actors including Deirdre Hall; Suzanne Rogers; Drake Hogestyn; Josh Taylor; John Aniston; Susan Seaforth Hayes; and Bill Hayes, and collectively about half of its producing, writing and directing staffs including executive producer/showrunner Ken Corday).	
16	Several talk shows based in New York City: late night show Watch What Happens Live with Andy Cohen (which planned to conduct episodes from host/executive producer Andy Cohen's apartment and interviews via video chat starting March 22 until those plans were shelved following the announcement of his coronavirus diagnosis two days prior); and daytime shows Rachael Ray and Today with Hoda & Jenna began taping episodes without audiences due to the state's coronavirus pandemic and concerns of communicable transmission of the illness among large crowds. TBS' Full Frontal with Samantha Bee will also resume taping episodes without audiences starting March 25. The Daily Show with Trevor Noah, which also tapes in New York, along with Los Angeles–based daytime shows The Talk and The Ellen DeGeneres Show, and late night shows, including Jimmy Kimmel Live! and The Late Late Show with James Corden, originally planned to also temporarily forego audiences effective March 16 before suspending production outright at the behest of their originating production studios due to the COVID-19 pandemic in California. (Kimmel taped its March 12 episode—guest hosted by former Democratic presidential candidate Pete Buttigieg due to Jimmy Kimmel's hosting duties for ABC's upcoming Who Wants to Be a Millionaire event series revival—without an audience. Kimmel, along with The Tonight Show Starring Jimmy Fallon, The Daily Show and The Late Late Show with Stephen Colbert, elected to produce digital-exclusive monologues for their respective YouTube channels or special episodes/monologue segments—in Tonight's case, at-home monologues were tacked onto repeats of recent episodes—conducted from the host's homes.) Shortly after this, The Daily Show with Trevor Noah also began making episodes filmed live at Trevor's home using a webcam and was temporarily renamed to The Daily Social Distancing Show with Trevor Noah as a result. With Kimmel pushed into reruns, starting March 17, ABC temporarily moved Nightline—which had been focusing its broadcasts on coverage of the worldwide pandemic since the previous week—to the 11:35 p.m. Eastern slot it formerly occupied from its March 1980 premiere until it switched timeslots with Kimmel in January 2013.	
17	Fremantle announces that the coronavirus pandemic has played a factor in the live production on ABC's American Idol being postponed, resulting in the suspension of all prep work and rehearsals with the finalists and contestants and staff being sent home to be with their families. During this time, ABC airs taped auditions that will conclude April 19.	
17	Fox Corporation announced that it would acquire the free, advertiser-supported streaming service Tubi for $440 million. The deal, which is expected to be completed by the beginning of the summer, will allow the company to expand its streaming content library including adding content from Fox's television properties.	
20–22	Hallmark Channel aired its Christmas movies early, in the hopes of lifting viewers' spirits in the wake of the growing coronavirus pandemic that has kept Americans home or quarantined.	
24	The International Olympic Committee reaches an agreement with the organizers of the 2020 Summer Olympics to postpone the games to the summer of 2021 due to the COVID-19 pandemic. The postponement of the games was a severe blow to NBC's summer schedule, which was scheduled to feature the games as a promotion for NBCUniversal's Peacock streaming service.	
30	TBS' late night talk show Conan resumes producing new episodes from host Conan O'Brien's Los Angeles residence, utilizing an iPhone to shoot the series without an audience or the use of their traditional studio. On July 6, O'Brien begins taping at the Coronet Theatre, still sans an audience but with a small crew. He later added an audience made entirely of cardboard cutouts of photos sent in by fans.	
31	Chris Cuomo, the host of CNN's Cuomo Prime Time, and whose brother is New York Governor Andrew Cuomo, confirmed that he has tested positive for the coronavirus and has quarantined himself at his home. (His wife, magazine editor Cristina Greeven, was later revealed to have also tested positive for the virus during the program's April 15 edition.) Chris will continue to host his show during his isolation, which was evident during the March 30 broadcast, when both brothers began bickering over why Chris was broadcasting his show from his basement, which doubles as his workspace when he isn't at CNN's New York studios.	
31	The NFL officially announced that it will expand its playoffs from a 12-team to 14-team format, with CBS and NBC paying around $70 million each to broadcast the two new postseason games. Nickelodeon will also air a separately produced telecast of corporate sibling CBS' game that will be tailored to a younger audience.	

== April ==
Date	Event	Source
3	Another CNN anchor, Brooke Baldwin, confirms that she has tested positive for the coronavirus after having experienced symptoms the previous day despite having practiced social distancing but notes that she'll recover. Baldwin joins fellow CNN anchor Chris Cuomo in having contracted COVID-19 within a week, and like Cuomo, continued to do her newscasts but on advice from her doctor due to check ups she took a leave of absence until she is cleared to return to work.	
4	Griffin Communications CBS affiliate KOTV/Tulsa and Sinclair ABC affiliate WEAR/Pensacola, Florida are both forced to temporarily shut down their facilities and outsource their newscasts to sister stations (fellow CBS affiliate KWTV/Oklahoma City for KOTV, and NBC affiliate WPMI/Mobile, Alabama for WEAR) due to employees testing positive for coronavirus and disinfection procedures being required. WEAR maintained limited operations as the master control facilities at its Pensacola studios also handle MyNetworkTV-affiliated sister WFGX/Fort Walton Beach, WPMI and its sister independent WJTC/Pensacola. (Sinclair operates WPMI/WJTC through an LMA with Deerfield Media, as part of a cross-market virtual quadropoly with WEAR/WFGX.) KOTV resumed Tulsa operations the next afternoon, while WEAR/WFGX resumed Pensacola operations on April 9.	
4–5	WrestleMania 36 took place over two nights on a tape-delay basis at the WWE Performance Center in Orlando, Florida with no fans attending. It was originally scheduled to take place at Raymond James Stadium in Tampa, Florida but was relocated due to the COVID-19 pandemic in Florida. The event was filmed on March 25–26.	
11	Saturday Night Live resumes production on its 45th season with Tom Hanks, who had been diagnosed with coronavirus the month prior and has since recovered, hosting a special episode featuring cast members and guest stars performing remotely from their homes. A second episode in the format aired on April 26, with Brad Pitt playing Dr. Anthony Fauci in the cold open and several guest stars also appearing during that episode. The real Dr. Fauci jokingly said Pitt should play him when asked during a CNN interview on April 10.	
13	Good Morning America anchor George Stephanopoulos is the latest news personality to confirm that he has tested positive for coronavirus, as he has been caring for his wife Ali Wentworth as she recovers from the virus. Although he admitted to being asymptomatic, Stephanopoulos has shown no signs of having a fever or cold and has been working from home since April 1, when he and Wentworth went public with the latter's diagnosis.	
13	President Donald Trump's re-election campaign files a lawsuit against Rockfleet Broadcasting-owned NBC affiliate WJFW/Rhinelander, Wisconsin for airing a campaign ad by Democratic Super PAC Priorities USA, titled "Exponential Threat," criticizing Trump's response to the coronavirus pandemic. The Trump campaign had issued a cease and desist letter warning other stations airing the ad in five swing states of legal action—even potential revocation of their FCC licenses, a move that would violate First Amendment protections applying to political advertising—on March 25 on grounds that the commercial falsely portrayed that Trump considered the pandemic a "hoax". (The ad—which the Trump campaign claimed aired on WJFW eleven times since the C&D letter's issuance—used a clip from a February 28 South Carolina campaign rally of Trump claiming alleged efforts by Democrats to politicize the coronavirus amounted to such, among other comments he made that initially downplayed the respiratory virus's impact; Priorities USA and media outlets who had reported on this ad have verified the claims as factual and not fabricated, although some fact checking organizations have noted the ad interpreted Trump's statement as denying the virus's existence rather than him making an unverifiable theory on its politicization.)	
18	Late night talk show hosts Jimmy Fallon, Jimmy Kimmel, and Stephen Colbert hosted One World: Together at Home to help raise awareness about COVID-19, as well as raise funds needed to help combat COVID-19. The event aired across NBC, ABC, CBS, Univision and (in a rare Saturday prime time telecast for the network) The CW, as well as a number of domestic multicast and pay television as well as international networks. The event featured a slew of A-list stars, and was curated by Lady Gaga. It was put together by social action platform Global Citizen and the World Health Organization to build on a series of live online concerts, organized by Global Citizen.	
23–25	The 2020 NFL draft aired live on ABC, ESPN, and NFL Network. This year's event has all team selections taking place via videoconferencing from their homes due to the original scheduled event that was set to take place in Paradise, Nevada canceled because of the COVID-19 pandemic in Nevada.	
24	RuPaul's Secret Celebrity Drag Race an extension of the RuPaul's Drag Race franchise premiered on VH1. The series features a trio of celebrities getting some help from beloved past contestants — deemed "Queen Supremes" in competing in fan-favorite challenges and step onto the runway in their new looks.	
26	American Idol went live from various locations, as the show's 20 finalists competed via remote video, while judges Luke Bryan, Katy Perry, and Lionel Richie, as well as host Ryan Seacrest and in-house mentor Bobby Bones also appeared from their homes.	
27	Fox News drops duo Diamond and Silk from all their platforms, including Fox Nation, over their negative comments and misinformation involving the coronavirus pandemic, which they have pushed as a conspiracy theory and as a way to help support a growing fringe movement opposed to numerous stay-at-home orders imposed by authorities in order to slow the spread, which the duo sees as hurting the chances of President Donald Trump (for which they also serve as surrogates and advisors) being re-elected in the 2020 presidential campaign.	
29	The National Academy of Television Arts and Sciences (NATAS) announces that the 47th Daytime Emmy Awards, the 41st Sports Emmy Awards, the 41st News & Documentary Emmy Awards, and the 71st Technology & Engineering Emmy Awards will be handed out at virtual ceremonies instead of in-person awards shows due to the coronavirus pandemic. The NATAS had previously postponed these events back in March. This move does not affect the 72nd Primetime Emmy Awards, run by NATAS' sister organization the Television Academy, or the 48th International Emmy Awards, run by the other sister organization the International Television Academy.	
29	The Scripps-owned Corpus Christi duopoly of NBC affiliate KRIS and independent K22JA-D are briefly knocked off the air after their transmission tower—which was also used by three local FM radio stations—collapsed, damaging its nearby transmitter building, after a heavily corroded guy-wire was de-anchored by strong winds affecting the Texas Coastal Bend that morning. Both stations temporarily moved their transmitters to a tower used by CBS-affiliated sister KZTV (operated by Scripps through an SSA with SagamoreHill Broadcasting). The Robstown-based tower had a history of poor maintenance, mostly pertaining to its lighting system, as cited in a $1.13-million FCC fine issued to Scripps on January 13. (Scripps agreed to accept liabilities that would have been beholden to Cordillera Communications—the former owner/operator of the Corpus Christi cluster, which was under FCC investigation for their management of its broadcast towers at the time of the sale—as a condition of its purchase of Cordillera's 10 television stations.)	

== May ==
Date	Event	Source
2	Kids' Choice Awards 2020: Celebrate Together aired on Nickelodeon and was simulcast on TeenNick, Nicktoons and the Nick Jr. Channel in the U.S. as well as various ViacomCBS-owned cable networks internationally. The virtual ceremony—the first major televised awards show to be held virtually amid the coronavirus pandemic—was hosted by Victoria Justice; Asher Angel performed during the ceremony. Avengers: Endgame ("Favorite Movie"; "Favorite Superhero," Tom Holland, shared with Spider-Man: Far From Home), Henry Danger ("Favorite Kids' TV Show"; "Favorite Male TV Star," Jace Norman), Stranger Things ("Favorite Family TV Show"; "Favorite Female TV Star," Millie Bobby Brown), and Shawn Mendes ("Favorite Male Artist"; "Favorite Music Collaboration," "Señorita" with Camila Cabello) tied for the most awards with two wins each. Other TV winners included SpongeBob SquarePants for "Favorite Animated Series," America's Got Talent for "Favorite Reality Show," Dove Cameron (Descendants 3) for "Favorite Movie Actress," and Ellen DeGeneres (Ellen's Game of Games) for "Favorite TV Host". Nickelodeon also announced a $1 million donation to childhood hunger awareness campaign No Kid Hungry during the broadcast. The event was originally scheduled to take place March 22 at The Forum in Inglewood with Chance the Rapper as host, but was postponed (as well as surrounding events scheduled for that weekend, including the tie-in music and entertainment festival Slimefest, that were cancelled outright) citing public health concerns due to the pandemic.	
3 – June 7	For the first time since 2006, CBS aired theatrical films on Sunday nights, utilizing titles from its co-owned Paramount Pictures library in order to fill a void left by several productions shut down due to the coronavirus pandemic. Among the movies scheduled to air during the six Sundays include two films from the Indiana Jones series, Forrest Gump, Mission: Impossible, Titanic and the sing-along version of Grease.	
4	Court TV becomes the first American television outlet to provide live audio of Supreme Court cases. (Prior to this, audio of SCOTUS cases, when such clips were made available, was usually presented to news outlets after proceedings took place.) The broadcasts, which resume the Scripps/Katz-owned multicast network's daytime trial coverage after being suspended since late March due to coronavirus-related postponements of criminal trials nationwide and will air over two three-day hearing periods (through May 14), include cases concerning President Donald Trump's alleged efforts to shield his financial records—most notably, his federal and state tax returns—from public record during his 2016 presidential campaign and Congressional investigations into alleged financial corruption while in and before taking office. This coincides with the Supreme Court, for the first time in its history, commencing temporarily conducting docketed hearings remotely (via teleconference) as a pandemic-related precautionary measure.	
4	Starz files a breach of contract lawsuit against Metro-Goldwyn-Mayer with the California Central District U.S. District Court, alleging that MGM had licensed more than 300 movies and series from its library (including, among others, Mad Max, The Terminator, Dances with Wolves, Rain Man and several James Bond films) to other television and streaming platforms in violation of exclusive library agreements it signed with the premium service between 2013 and 2015. The lawsuit stems from MGM's 2019 admission that one of the cited films in the agreement, Bill & Ted's Excellent Adventure, had also been licensed to Amazon Prime Video, which was brought to Starz's attention by a network employee. Starz (whose parent, Lionsgate, had owned rival pay service Epix—which has aired some of the films in question—from its October 2009 launch until Lionsgate and Paramount sold their interests to co-partner MGM in 2017, following the former's purchase of Starz) also accuses MGM of licensing several other films included in the exclusivity deals to other pay-TV and streaming platforms. MGM downplayed the claims, with studio counsel Orin Snyder suggesting that Starz is using the dispute to deflect cause of its "failure to win in the [pay television] marketplace."	
4	An all-virtual episode of the CBS legal drama All Rise aired. The episode, which marked the first primetime scripted series to attempt anything resembling production since shows began shutting down in mid-March, used FaceTime, WebEx, Zoom, and other videotelephony software to produce an episode about how the pandemic and social distancing are affecting the criminal justice system. Virtual footage was shot in each of the series regulars' homes, and producers planned to use VFX to create the necessary backgrounds. In addition, a cinematographer operating solo from a vehicle captured exterior footage that reflected the desolate environment that currently exists on the streets and in the neighborhoods of Los Angeles. The entire episode was shot abiding by social distancing rules and technologies taking place in the world.	
5	ESPN begins carrying live telecasts of the KBO League, the top level of professional baseball in South Korea. The KBO League was one of the first sports leagues to resume play after South Korea largely prevented the major outbreaks of coronavirus that affected most other developed countries. KBO weekday games are played during the early morning hours in the eastern United States.	
6	In the largest fine ever paid by a broadcasting firm, Sinclair Broadcast Group agrees to pay $48 million in civil penalties under an FCC consent decree that would close investigations into Sinclair's disclosure of information regarding its aborted 2017 acquisition of Tribune Media's assets, its lack of adherence to good faith negotiation of retransmission consent agreements and its failures to identify sponsors of news stories and long-form infotainment programs that Sinclair produced for both its and other independently owned stations. The penalty is two times the prior record fine of $24 million that was paid by Univision Communications in 2007 (for misappropriation of youth-oriented telenovelas as befitting educational programming mandates), and encompasses a $13 million fine proposed by the FCC In December 2017, over sponsorship identification violations regarding its time-leased programming.	
7	ViacomCBS reaches an agreement with YouTube TV in which the legacy MTV Networks, including Nickelodeon and Comedy Central, plus BET will join CBS, The CW, and Showtime on the streaming platform in the summer. The company also announced plans to introduce a streaming service into international markets and rebrand its CBS All Access service to incorporate content from the cable networks.	
9	Within 48 hours of the National Football League unveiling its tentative schedule for the upcoming season, sports website The Athletic reports that ESPN has reassigned the Monday Night Football announcing crew of Joe Tessitore on play-by-play and Booger McFarland on color commentary. The pair's unpopularity with viewers is said to have factored into the network's decision. Longtime network personality Steve Levy is considered the frontrunner for the play-by-play role, with Dan Orlovsky, Louis Riddick, and/or Brian Griese his potential partners.	
9	Nickelodeon's Danger Force airs a quarantined-themed episode titled "Quaran-kini", which features the entire cast fighting their archenemies The Toddler (Ben Giroux) and Frankini (Frankie Grande) in order to stop a natural gas leak while they are quarantined in their home under orders from the vice-mayor. The episode in actually was filmed from the homes of the actors using Zoom due to the production of all Nickelodeon shows suspended during the COVID-19 pandemic in the United States.	
13	The two-hour live finale and the reunion show of the milestone 40th season (titled Winners at War) of Survivor were conducted via video chatting instead of the traditional live audience as in a response on health and safety concerns due to the COVID-19 pandemic. Due to the season's entire cast that featured 20 previous winners (from Africa and David vs. Goliath), the finale named Tony Vlachos, who previously won Cagayan, as only the second two-time 'Sole Survivor' in the show's history (with the first being Sandra Diaz-Twine, who she was the first to achieve the distinction after winning Pearl Islands and Heroes vs. Villains in nearly a decade ago; Diaz-Twine was eliminated on the sixth episode and left the competition on the next episode due to the Edge of Extinction twist first featured two seasons ago); at a grand prize of US$2 million, it marked its largest prize money awarded for a CBS reality television and in the history of the entire franchise of Survivor.	
16	Graduate Together: America Honors the High School Class of 2020 aired at 8 pm ET/PT and 7 pm CT/MT on broadcast (ABC, CBS, Fox, NBC, California Music Channel, The CW, and Univision (Spanish only)), cable (CNN, Fox Business, Fox News, Freeform, and MSNBC), and streaming platforms (ABC News Live, Associated Press, Bleacher Report, Complex Networks, Facebook, FoxNow, Hulu, Instagram, NBC News Now, NowThis News, PeopleTV, The Roku Channel, Roland Martin Unfiltered, Reuters, SiriusXM, Snapchat, TikTok, USO, The Washington Post, and YouTube), except PBS due to flex programming on member stations over most of their schedules and broadcast times for network shows may vary.	
17	Just Sam is crowned the winner of the 18th season of American Idol, the first time in the series' run that a finals event was televised live without a studio audience, relying on just texting from viewers at home, with the finalists performing their songs from their homes during the COVID-19 pandemic.	
19	Ruby Rose announced that she will be departing the lead role of Kate Kane on the CW superhero drama Batwoman after one season; Rose did not disclose the reasoning behind her exit. Warner Bros. Television announced that the role will be replaced with a new character (although they earlier considered recasting another person in the main character role) for the second season, which The CW delayed until early 2021 as a precaution due to uncertainty on resumption of production of the network's shows amid the COVID-19 pandemic. On July 8, it was announced that Javicia Leslie has been cast as Ryan Wilder / Batwoman, replacing Rose's role.	
19	Todd Tilghman was announced the winner of the 18th season of The Voice. Tilghman became the first artist performing first in the season to win the show, the seventh winner coached by country icon Blake Shelton since Chloe Kohanski in season 13, and also the oldest winner in the American version, at age 41. In a rare situation, Carson Daly forego the announcement for the runner-up placements between the two artists, Thunderstorm Artis and Toneisha Harris, but instead revealed on a Twitter post two days later on the 21st that Harris finished as the season's runner-up. This is also the first season not to feature a streaming service download/stream voting 'multiplier' since season three due to the circumstances of the pandemic making weekly recordings of show performances being made available on streaming services impossible.	
20 – June 17	ABC revived The Wonderful World of Disney after a four-year hiatus as an umbrella title of airings of Walt Disney Pictures library films premiering on network television in the first time, while also serving as a promotional vehicle for Disney's Disney+ streaming service. The movies aired on Wednesday nights were Moana, Marvel Studios' Thor: The Dark World, Disney/Pixar's Up, Big Hero 6, and Disney/Pixar's Toy Story 3. This marked the first time since 1954 that Disney-centric content aired on Wednesday evenings on the network, when the company's first series, Disneyland, premiered.	
26	The major network affiliates in the Las Vegas market (KSNV/KVCW, KLAS-TV and KTNV) simultaneously adopt the ATSC 3.0 standard, becoming the first market in the United States to adopt the second-generation transmission standard.	
29	While conducting a live report for CNN's New Day on the riots in Minneapolis–Saint Paul amid protests following the murder of George Floyd, correspondent Omar Jimenez, producer Bill Kirkos and photojournalist Lionel Mendez are arrested—as officers moved in to arrest a protester behind them—by the Minnesota State Patrol, citing the news crew's failure to heed warnings to relocate from the scene. Jimenez identified himself to officers by holding his CNN press badge while reporting, and informed officers that they would move if needed. CNN, other journalism organizations (including MSNBC and Fox News), and various journalists condemned the arrest as a violation of the crew's First Amendment press freedom rights, while other observers suggested that Jimenez (who is Afro-Latino) may have been racially profiled. Minnesota Governor Tim Walz apologized to CNN President Jeff Zucker for the arrest, and the crew was released after one hour in custody after officials confirmed their press status. Later that day, rioters in Atlanta vandalized the network's world headquarters at CNN Center, breaking its front windows, spray painting graffiti, and throwing firecrackers into the building. Atlanta Mayor Keisha Lance Bottoms slammed rioters for taking their actions out on a media building and a network headquarters for no reason whatsoever but to add more problems for her city.	
29	Protests following Floyd's murder and similar officer-involved deaths of African-Americans in other cities also proved volatile for other television news organizations. In Louisville, reporter Kaitlin Rust and her crew with Gray-owned NBC affiliate WAVE were purposely hit with pepper bullets fired by Louisville Metropolitan Police Department officers, while a Ford Escape news vehicle belonging to Hearst-owned CBS affiliate WLKY was damaged while the station crew were covering out-of-control protests regarding another person who was also killed by LMPD officers on March 13 that has also sparked calls for justice, Breonna Taylor. Like Jimenez, Rust acknowledged that the separate incidents has gone viral on social media and has received major support from fellow journalists and celebrities. WAVE management called the action on its news crew uncalled for and have addressed the issue to LMPD, which plans to investigate the incident. The protesters in Washington, D.C. who were gathering near Lafayette Square and The White House turned their attack towards Fox News reporter Leland Vittert while he was on air, prompting him and his crew to escape the scene immediately. The Guardian later reported the media had been the subject of police violence and harassment 50 times on May 29 and 30, including being shot at, teargassed, arrested and intimidated.	

== June ==
Date	Event	Source
1	At 5:00 p.m. EDT, many ViacomCBS Domestic Media Networks including CBS Sports Network, Comedy Central, MTV, and BET suspend programming for 8 minutes and 46 seconds, representing the length of time that Minneapolis Police Department officer Derek Chauvin spent with his knee on the neck of George Floyd. Airing during that time is a simple black graphic with the words "I Can't Breathe" along with the sounds of breathing. Nickelodeon and its sister networks, as children's networks, drew some criticism for briefly running the spot, followed by a Declaration of Kids' Rights an hour later. Other social media users, meanwhile, pointed to the broadcast as an opportunity for parents to have a discussion with their children about racial injustice.	
1	The Tonight Show host Jimmy Fallon apologized for performing as Chris Rock in blackface during a Saturday Night Live skit in 2000. Rock later accepted Fallon's apology and noted they are still good friends.	
2	Australian Prime Minister Scott Morrison has instructed Australia's embassy in the U.S. to investigate an incident that took place in Washington, D.C. on June 1, in which Seven Network News cameraman Tim Myers was punched and hit with a shield and U.S. correspondent Amelia Brace was hit with a truncheon while trying to escape while reporting live on Seven's morning show Sunrise (on June 2, a day ahead of the United States). The police, dressed in riot gear, were removing protesters ahead of a media appearance by President Donald Trump, who moments after delivering a speech where he threatened to impose the Insurrection Act of 1807 by using military action to quell rioting, followed through with pushing back the crowd in order to visit a church and hold up a bible in a photo opportunity that was condemned by religious leaders. This move on foreign journalists comes amid a string of police attacks on media during the protests sparked by the murder of George Floyd while in police custody.	
2	Just one day after being placed on administrative leave after making insensitive comments about the Black Lives Matter movement in a tweet to former Sacramento Kings Center DeMarcus Cousins, Grant Napear, who handled play by play for the aforementioned NBA franchise on NBC Sports California, announced his resignation from both the organization and the network, and at the same time was also fired from Kings flagship radio outlet KHTK by parent owner Bonneville International, who were upset over his remarks and not making a sincere apology. Napear had called Kings games on either television or radio since 1988 and had been a part of KHTK's lineup in various roles since 1997.	
3	In the wake of the murder of George Floyd by a police officer, a protest is held at the Nicollet Mall studios of WCCO-TV calling for anchor Liz Collin to resign from the station on the grounds of a conflict of interest. Collin is the wife of Bob Kroll, an officer for the Minneapolis Police Department and the controversial head of the Police Officers Federation of Minneapolis.	
5	The nationwide protests following George Floyd's murder by an on-duty police officer caused Paramount Network's Cops and A&E's Live PD to announce in separate statements that they are pulling their reality-based shows from the schedule. Cops, which has been on the air since 1989 (when it debuted on Fox, and later moved to Paramount Network's predecessor Spike TV in 2013), has not aired a new episode since May 11 and was scheduled to return for its 33rd season on June 8. Reruns were removed from the lineup a week before, while Live PD, which is also A&E's top rated program since its 2016 debut, axed scheduled live installments for June 5 and 6. Seasons 26–32 of Cops have also been removed from iTunes and Amazon Prime Video. On June 9, Cops was canceled after six years on the network, leaving already completed episodes shelved, while A&E canceled Live PD the day after, itself under fire over a 2019 incident involving an arrest of a Texas man who was tased that aired, and whose unaired footage was wiped, leading to an investigation being opened by the local DA after a body camera from one of the officers was released. Cops reruns aired on WGN America until June 30, but continues to stream on its own Pluto TV channel (though the service slightly changed the logo of the network to remove the Spike logo that was underneath, a subtle indication of ViacomCBS' disassociation from the show.)	
5	Lifetime announced that it has severed all ties with Abby Lee Miller and immediately cancelled her upcoming series Virtual Dance Off after complaints about her racial and insensitive remarks towards other dancers surfaced through the Instagram account of Adriana Smith, mother of Dance Moms Season 8 dancer Kamryn, that was posted in response to Miller's Blackout Tuesday IG post in support of Black Lives Matter. Miller has since apologized for the remarks.	
5	Special Report with Bret Baier on Fox News airs a graphic displaying positive stock market performance in the wake of the deaths of African-Americans Martin Luther King Jr., Michael Brown, and George Floyd, as well as the acquittal of police officers in the assault of Rodney King. After receiving criticism from social media users for running the information, including Martin Luther King III, the network apologized for not adding context to the graphic.	
6	CNN partners with Sesame Street to present a town hall meeting for children and families that focuses on the current issues surrounding race in the United States. CNN personalities Van Jones and Erica Hill serve as hosts for the event, which also features Sesame Street characters Big Bird, Elmo, and Abby Cadabby. It is the second venture between CNN and Sesame Street after an April town hall on the COVID-19 pandemic.	
8	After tweets deemed misogynist and racist remarks resurface, actor Hartley Sawyer who has played Ralph Dibny on The CW series The Flash for the past three seasons was fired from the series. The tweets, all from before he joined The CW series, make references to sexual assault and contain "racist and homophobic language." Sawyer's Twitter account has been deleted, but screenshots of the old posts have circulated online in the past two weeks. "Hartley Sawyer will not be returning for season seven of The Flash," reads a statement from The CW, producers Warner Bros. TV and Berlanti Productions and executive producer Eric Wallace. "In regards to Mr. Sawyer's posts on social media, we do not tolerate derogatory remarks that target any race, ethnicity, national origin, gender, or sexual orientation. Such remarks are antithetical to our values and policies, which strive and evolve to promote a safe, inclusive and productive environment for our workforce." It is not known at this point as to what will happen to Ralph on The Flash, in which he had just warned Sue Dearbon (Natalie Dreyfuss), who is destined to become his wife, that Eva McCulloch framed her for Joseph Carver's Murder in the sixth-season finale.	
9	Four regulars from Bravo's Vanderpump Rules, Stassi Schroeder, Kristen Doute, Max Boyens, and Brett Caprioni, are fired after the producers on the reality based series learned that they were involved in a series of racially motivated altercations. The move comes after former member Faith Stowers (who is African-American) revealed in an Instagram Live chat that in 2018, Schroeder and Doute had called the police to report her for crimes that had been reported in a Daily Mail article about a Black woman wanted for theft, but the woman pictured in the article was not Stowers. Schroeder and Doute later admitted it was done as a prank. Schroeder's ouster has occurred one day after her agency, UTA, and her public relations firm, Metro Public Relations, have dropped her because of her actions toward Stowers. Fuse Literary, Doute's book agency, has also cut ties with her. Additionally, Boyens and Caprioni were let go after past racist tweets were uncovered after the most recent season that premiered in January.	
9	Netflix and BritBox removed the BBC comedy series Little Britain and its follow up Come Fly With Me from its library due to sketches involving characters being performed through using blackface. The decision was mutually agreed upon by its stars/creators, Matt Lucas and David Walliams, the latter admitted that he regretted playing Black characters. A day later, Netflix removed four comedy shows featuring outspoken Australian performer Chris Lilley from its platform in Australia and New Zealand, in which he portrayed characters that were stereotypical depictions of the country's Aboriginal people. Like the United States, Australia has also come under fire over police brutality, racism, and protests over high-profile officer-involved crimes against minorities. On June 11, Netflix added two more British series, The League of Gentlemen and The Mighty Boosh, to the list of programs removed over the use of characters being performed in blackface.	
10	Six companies – T-Mobile, SmileDirectClub, Disney, Papa John's Pizza, Varidesk, and Jackson Hewitt Tax Service – announce they are pulling their advertising from Tucker Carlson Tonight after host Tucker Carlson criticized the George Floyd protests, by saying that they are not about race and that white supremacy in America is a hoax.	
12	ABC announces that Matt James will be the lead for Season 25 of The Bachelor in 2021. James will be just the second African-American lead (after Rachel Lindsay of The Bachelorette's 13th season) in the 18-year history of the Bachelor/Bachelorette reality franchise, which has long been criticized for deficiencies in cast diversity.	
12	ABC's Good Morning America severed ties with Canadian celebrity stylist contributor Jessica Mulroney, following a social media firestorm over comments Mulroney allegedly made to Black influencer Sasha Exeter, who accused Mulroney of threatening her after Exeter asked that public figures use their social media following as a platform for good. The fallout also saw Mulroney's Canadian reality series I Do, Redo cancelled by Bell Media-owned CTV due to conduct by Mulroney that "conflicts with our commitment to diversity and equality," along with sponsorships and deals with her ending abruptly.	
12	Television productions based in the state of California were cleared to resume production, subject to the approval of local county officials.	
13	Fox News removed a series of images that were photoshopped on its website, which published digitally altered and misleading photos on stories about Seattle's Capitol Hill Autonomous Zone (CHAZ) in what photojournalism experts called a clear violation of ethical standards for news organizations. The doctored photos featured a man standing with a military-style rifle in front of what appeared to be a smashed retail storefront; that photo featuring the rifleman was actually a mashup of photos from different days, taken by different photographers that was spliced by a Getty Images photo of an armed man, who had been at the protest zone June 10, with other images from May 30 of smashed windows in downtown Seattle. Another altered image combined the gunman photo with yet another image, making it appear as though he was standing in front of a sign declaring "You are now entering Free Cap Hill." Another photo featuring a frightening image of a burning city above a package of stories about Seattle's protests, headlined "CRAZY TOWN." The photo actually showed a scene from St. Paul, Minnesota, on May 30. Fox News Channel had defended the disputed pictures but after The Seattle Times (which investigated and verified the pictures), freelance photographer David Ryder (who originally took the photo of the rifleman and distributed the photo through Getty Images), and other media organizations called them out, the images were removed.	
18	NFL RedZone and NFL Network are removed from Dish Network and Sling TV due to a carriage dispute.	
21	The 2020 ESPY Awards air on ESPN.	
22	At the request of star/creator/executive producer Tina Fey and co-creator Robert Carlock, NBCUniversal has agreed to remove four episodes from the 2006–13 comedy 30 Rock from all platforms, including syndication and sales, due to content featuring or depicting scenes that featured characters performing in blackface. The episodes that were requested to be removed include season 3/episode 2 "Believe in the Stars", season 5/episode 10 "Christmas Attack Zone", season 6/episode 19 "Live from Studio 6H", and the east coast version of season 5/episode 4 "Live Show". Fey made the decision because she felt uncomfortable with having the episodes as part of the series and due to a changing climate.	
23	Jimmy Kimmel issues an apology for his impersonation of NBA star Karl Malone on Comedy Central's The Man Show during the 1990s, which involved Kimmel dressing in blackface. "There is nothing more important to me than your respect, and I apologize to those who were genuinely hurt or offended by the makeup I wore or the words I spoke," the Jimmy Kimmel Live! host said in a statement, adding that he never realized that it could be viewed as more than "an imitation of a human being."	
24	At the request of Scrubs creator and executive producer Bill Lawrence and ABC Studios, Hulu removes three episodes of the series that feature blackface: season 3's "My Fifteen Seconds" and season 5's "My Jiggly Ball" and "My Chopped Liver".	
24	Two animated comedies have announced that its stars will relinquish their roles, under the belief that a person of color should take over the roles. Kristen Bell steps down as the biracial Molly on Apple TV+'s Central Park, and Jenny Slate announced that she will no longer voice Missy, another mixed-race character, on Netflix's Big Mouth after three seasons. Both actresses will voice new characters on the respective shows.	
24	The CBS soap opera The Bold and the Beautiful becomes the first scripted series to resume production following Hollywood's three-month, coronavirus-imposed shutdown. Such was attempted a week earlier, but it was decided on that day to expand testing first. Another attempt was planned on June 23, but it was decided on that day to discuss questions about health department testing first.	
26	Depictions of blackface are further acted against, as one such scene from The Office's ninth season episode "Dwight Christmas" is edited out, and the second season episode of Community, "Advanced Dungeons & Dragons", is pulled.	
26	Voice actor Mike Henry in a tweet announced that he would no longer voice Cleveland Brown on Fox's animated series Family Guy. Henry, a white man, voiced the African-American Brown since the show's inception in 1999 and also voiced the character and his son, Rallo Tubbs, in the 2009–13 spinoff series The Cleveland Show.	
26	The Simpsons joins the growing lists of animated television series to announce that they will no longer have white actors voice characters who are non-white on the show.	
26	The 47th Daytime Emmy Awards aired on CBS, hosted by Sharon Osbourne, Sheryl Underwood, Eve, Carrie Ann Inaba and Marie Osmond, marking the first time that the Daytime Emmys will broadcast on American television since 2015 (after being relegated to streaming media), and the first time on a broadcast network since 2011. This year's event had the awards presented via videoconferencing because of the COVID-19 pandemic, but continues to be produced by Associated Television International. This is also the first year that a Daytime Emmy will be awarded in a single gender-neutral younger performer drama category, replacing both the younger actor and younger actress categories.	
27	Depictions of blackface are further acted against, as one such scene from The Golden Girls's third season episode "Mixed Blessings" is pulled on Hulu.	
28	The BET Awards 2020 aired simultaneously on BET, BET Her and CBS, hosted by Amanda Seales.	
29	The U.S. Golf Association announces the return of its events to NBC from Fox Sports after a six-year absence. This includes major tournaments like the U.S. Open and U.S. Women's Open. Fox elected to defer its rights to USGA competition through 2027 to NBC after the COVID-19 pandemic resulted in this year's U.S. Open being rescheduled to September, when Fox typically airs college football and the NFL.	
29	Nickelodeon revived Nick News with an hour-long special hosted by Alicia Keys about children, race, and unity and meant to amplify the voices and experiences of Black kids across the country in the wake of the large-scale protests that have rocked the United States in recent weeks following the murder of George Floyd. Keys lead a series of conversations with special guests, including the co-founders of the Black Lives Matter, Patrisse Cullors, Alicia Garza, and Opal Tometi.	
30	Telecommunications provider Rainbow Communications, which serves mostly rural portions of northeastern Kansas (including its headquarters of Everest), discontinues its cable television service to its customers within the state after 67 years, citing a migration among its customers to television viewing via streaming services (which it accounted for 80% of Rainbow's internet traffic). The company will continue to offer telephone and broadband internet services to its customers, and initiate a "Streaming Care" program in February to assist remaining cable customers who wish to transition to streaming.	

== July ==
Date	Event	Source
1	Fox News fires America's Newsroom anchor Ed Henry following allegations of sexual misconduct by a former employee.	
3	The "repack" of the broadcast spectrum stemming from the FCC's spectrum incentive auction finished its tenth and final phase. All full-power American television channels have settled into their final frequencies, though due to the pandemic and limited tower staffing, may not be at their full authorized power.	
7	CBS fires MacGyver and Magnum P.I. executive producer Peter M. Lenkov following an investigation into a complaint about a toxic work environment on MacGyver and the 2010s version of Hawaii Five-0 which ended in April. Lenkov's deal with CBS Studios has also been terminated.	
11	Tucker Carlson Tonight head writer Blake Neff resigns after it was discovered he had made racist, homophobic and sexist remarks on an online forum using a pseudonym. Carlson then later announced on July 13 that he would take a leave of absence after he apologized to viewers over his former writer's remarks and regretted not knowing about what Neff did while working on his show.	
13	Nexstar Media Group announces it has transferred its option to purchase CW affiliate WPIX/New York City to affiliate company Mission Broadcasting, which chose to exercise the option in turn and buy the station from the E. W. Scripps Company for $75 million plus accrued interest. Once closed, expected to occur by the end of the year pending FCC approval, the Mission purchase would reunite WPIX with 28 of its 43 former Tribune Broadcasting stablemates (including WGN-TV/Chicago, which was co-owned with WPIX from their respective foundings in 1948 until 2019) that Nexstar acquired through its acquisition of Tribune Media in December 2019. Tribune sold WPIX to Scripps in September 2019, in a spin-off of eight Tribune stations by Nexstar (which received the buy-back option that became exercisable on March 31 through the end of 2021) to alleviate conflicts with FCC ownership rules that were created through the purchase.	
13	The Young and the Restless, another CBS soap opera, plans to restart production tentatively. A spike in COVID-19 pandemic in California delayed the restart from its original date on July 6.	
13	Dancing with the Stars host Tom Bergeron announced in a tweet that he had been let go from the series after 15 years. Shortly after, ABC and BBC Studios made an official announcement saying co-host Erin Andrews would also be exiting the program. On July 14, Tyra Banks is named the new host and producer of the series.	
13	The Tonight Show Starring Jimmy Fallon returns to 30 Rockefeller Plaza (sans audience) after four months. The show moved temporarily to a re-decorated Studio 6A (the former Megyn Kelly Today studio) to enforce social distancing between Fallon and the members of house band The Roots, and interviews and most show functions remain remotely done via videoconferencing. Announcer/sidekick Steve Higgins has yet to appear in person.	
13	Blackhall Studios in Atlanta reopens for television and film production despite growing numbers of COVID-19 cases in the city; production on one of its headline series, Step Up, is nevertheless immediately suspended following the discovery of the body of its lead actress, TV veteran Naya Rivera, who died on July 8. Tributes are paid to the young actress who "changed queer television history".	
14	ViacomCBS fired Nick Cannon from his hosting duties on VH1's Wild 'n Out after 15 years for failing to apologize for perpetuating anti-Semitism in comments made on an episode of his YouTube show in June, when Cannon was interviewing Public Enemy's Professor Griff, who exited that group over his own anti-semitic remarks in 1989. Cannon stated "It's never hate speech, you can't be anti-Semitic when we are the Semitic people. When we are the same people who they want to be. That's our birthright. We are the true Hebrews," while also mentioning anti-Jewish conspiracy theories. This marked the second time in Cannon's television career that he had been fired for making critical racial remarks, as he was dropped from America's Got Talent for making similar statements in 2016. On July 16, Cannon announced that he was leaving radio indefinitely, ending his one-year tenure as morning host at Rhythmic Top 40 KPWR/Los Angeles and his syndicated radio program cancelled by Skyview Networks. The next day saw Debmar-Mercury push Cannon's syndicated television talk show to a September 2021 premiere rather than in two months.	
14	A majority of NBC's major affiliate groups, including Tegna, Hearst Television, Sinclair Broadcast Group, Nexstar Media Group, Scripps, Quincy Media, Cox Media Group, Rockfleet Broadcasting and Gray Television, who altogether reach more than half the nation, opted out of airing the July 16 broadcast of "30 Rock: A One-Time Special" due to its focus on NBCUniversal's streaming service, Peacock, which these owners believe could siphon viewers away from their stations, along with the special being tailored to be scripted like an upfront presentation for NBCUniversal's other cable properties with limited viewer interest. Despite this setback, the special is still scheduled to air across parent company Comcast's cable networks the day after in a "roadblock" airing after its NBC broadcast, along with cable and satellite VOD platforms. A few affiliates, like KPRC-TV/Houston, did opt to delay the special to late night slots as a consolation.	
20	News Corporation (and successor company Fox Corporation)'s growing allegations of sexual harassment and abuses, including claims of gender discrimination, raping, retaliation, and sex trafficking, comes to light as a lawsuit has been filed by former Fox Business Network associate producer Jennifer Eckhart and former contributor Cathy Areu against Fox News Channel hosts Tucker Carlson, Sean Hannity, Howard Kurtz and its contributor Gianno Caldwell. According to the plaintiffs, they point to incidents involving Carlson propositioning favors towards Areu at a hotel, which she claims resulted in being fired and a series of undisclosed conduct regarding Hannity and Kurtz towards women. As expected, the accused defendants are denying and dismissing the claims brought against them.	
25	As the 2020 Major League Baseball season starts after a four-month delay, Fox Sports begins to virtually add CGI fans to stadium seats (which will actually be empty due to COVID-19 pandemic restrictions) on its Saturday baseball broadcasts. The artificial fans were criticized for their unrealistic actions and inconsistent appearances.	
25	Claims by Judy Mikovits that Anthony Fauci was responsible for creating the coronavirus are removed from a planned episode of the Sinclair Broadcast Group-produced America This Week after viewers contacted the company's local stations to voice their objection to the segment's airing. Sinclair initially stated that while it did not share the views of Mikovits, who featured in the controversial Plandemic video, it wanted to include differing viewpoints. Program host Eric Bolling later said that he had been "caught off guard" by the allegations from Mikovits.	
27	WarnerMedia places The Ellen DeGeneres Show under investigation following numerous complaints from past and present staff members of the long-running talk show, who say that the titular host is the opposite of her "Be kind to one another" persona behind the scenes. This comes after members of the production crew voiced their displeasure of DeGeneres cutting her union show crew in favor of freelancers when the show returned from hiatus, with production occurring at DeGeneres' house in Santa Barbara, California back in April. That was followed up with stories from various people—ranging from a Twitter thread that was created by comedian Kevin T. Porter back in March, to a former security guard who served as DeGeneres' bodyguard during the 2014 Academy Awards—that DeGeneres is shown to be very rude off-air, a contrast to her on-air personality. DeGeneres herself commented on the accusations on July 30, stating in a memo to her staff that she was sorry and that she aims to "correct" the issues that surround the behind-the-scenes staff. On July 31, the online news site BuzzFeed released an article that former employees of The Ellen DeGeneres Show say that executive producers engaged in all sorts of sexual misconduct and harassment, with one such former employee stating that head writer and executive producer Kevin Leman asked him if he could perform an act of sexual activity in a bathroom during a company party in 2013. On August 17, it was announced that Leman, Ed Glavin, and Jonathan Norman were fired from the show.	

== August ==
Date	Event	Source
4	The Late Show with Stephen Colbert music producer Giovanni Cianci has been fired following his sexual misconduct allegation.	
5	NBC and A. Smith & Co. Productions severs all ties with American Ninja Warrior season 11 winner Drew Drechsel following his arrest on federal child sex-related charges on August 4.	
5	The COVID-19 pandemic became a catalyst in E! announcing the official cancellation of all three New York-based shows, E! News, Pop of the Morning, and In The Room as a part of several organizational changes and cuts through the week affecting all of NBCUniversal and its cable and streaming operations. All three shows had suspended broadcasts on March 13, torpedoing the network's plan to create a New York beachhead for live daily programming after only 2½ months in production. E!'s news operation overall has remained active through its web and social media presences.	
10	CBS's late night talk shows The Late Show with Stephen Colbert and The Late Late Show with James Corden return to their studios, both without audiences, after five months of the hosts taping from their homes. Colbert's show is being taped from an office in the Ed Sullivan Theater building without his house band (although bandleader Jon Batiste continues to appear via videoconferencing). Both hosts are still exclusively conducting guest interviews via video conferencing.	
11	Musician Trey Anastasio becomes The Tonight Show Starring Jimmy Fallon's first in-person guest since the COVID-19 pandemic began five months ago in mid-March, as well as the first in-studio guest for all network late night shows.	
14	In a response to a remark made by President Donald Trump's attorney Jenna Ellis in a Twitter feed on August 11 in which she compared Joe Biden's just announced Vice President running mate Kamala Harris's voice to Marge Simpson, the producers of the Fox animated sitcom The Simpsons wasted no time to put out a video featuring the character (voiced by Julie Kavner), who not only dismissed the comparisons, but also criticized Trump's baseless claims that he wants to protect suburban housewives from their community being overrun by people of color as well as being stereotyped as such as an attempt to attract female voters in the aforementioned areas: "I don't usually get into politics, but the president's senior adviser Jenna Ellis said Kamala Harris sounds like me... Lisa says she doesn't mean it as a compliment. If that's so, as an ordinary suburban housewife, I am starting to feel a little disrespected. I teach my children not to name-call, Jenna." Marge closed it out with this snide statement: "I would going to say 'pissed off,' but I'm afraid they'd bleep it." Interestingly enough, Harris's looks and appearance has also sparked interest from Maya Rudolph, who has confirmed that the producers of Saturday Night Live is asking her to return for a series of performances as Harris after she portrayed her in a 2019 sketch.	
17	Byron Allen's Allen Media Broadcasting announces that it is acquiring ABC affiliate KITV Honolulu and its satellite sisters from SJL Broadcasting for $30 million. The sale also marked the second departure from the market for SJL, who had previously owned KHON-TV before selling that station to New Vision Television prior to acquiring KITV from Hearst Television in 2015.	
17	Actor Stuart D. Baker has been fired from the Adult Swim animated series Squidbillies after 15 years by the show's producers after he posted negative and sexist comments about Dolly Parton and the Black Lives Matter movement on social media, in which the singer showed her support for BLM in a series of interviews. It is not known at this point if Baker's main character Early Cuyler on Squidbillies will either be replaced or written off, which comes just a year after Adult Swim renewed the series for a thirteenth season and is expected to return to production within the next few months.	
17 – 20	The 2020 Democratic National Convention is broadcast on all the major networks.	
19	During the first game of the Cincinnati Reds' doubleheader against the Kansas City Royals, play-by-play announcer Thom Brennaman is overheard on Fox Sports Ohio commenting on "one of the fag capitals of the world". While it is not clear what he was referring to, Brennaman continued on with his duties until the middle of the second game, when he was replaced by Jim Day. "I don't know if I'm going to be putting on this headset again," said Brennaman in apologizing for the remark. Brennaman was suspended by the Reds, and Fox Sports subsequently removed him from its coverage of the upcoming NFL season. Almost a month later, Brennaman officially resigned from his play-by-play role with the Reds.	
20	Another sportscaster, Mike Milbury of NBC Sports, comments in a live broadcast about the absence of women to distract National Hockey League players while in isolation during the Stanley Cup Playoffs. The NHL indicated its concerns about the remark, which it called "insensitive and insulting", to NBC. Milbury apologized the following day, while NBC announced he would not participate in that night's broadcast. Milbury later stepped away from coverage of the remainder of the playoffs.	
24	The 2020 iHeartRadio Music Awards was officially cancelled due to the COVID-19 pandemic; the winners would be announced on September 4 to 7 at the affiliated iHeartRadio stations nationwide. Originally set to air on Fox with Usher as the host, scheduled for March 29 and the show lost its venue, the Shrine Auditorium, due to coronavirus-related public assembly restrictions on March 12, and iHeartMedia officially postponed the ceremony on March 16. In its place, the iHeart Living Room Concert for America aired on March 29 in a portion of its original timeslot.	
24 – 27	The 2020 Republican National Convention airs on all the major networks.	
26	The Milwaukee Bucks boycott Game 5 of their NBA Playoff series against the Orlando Magic, which was set to be televised on NBA TV, in support of protests following the shooting of Jacob Blake in Kenosha, Wisconsin several days earlier on August 23. The NBA would later postpone that night's playoff games as well, Game 5 of the Thunder–Rockets series and Game 5 of the Trail Blazers–Lakers series which will be rescheduled to a later date. Commentator and former player Kenny Smith also dramatically walked off the set during an NBA on TNT studio show. The next day, several Major League Baseball games were postponed in support of the protests, as well as all National Hockey League playoff games on the 27th and 28th.	
27	Hours after Hurricane Laura makes landfall in Cameron, Louisiana, the studio-to-transmitter link of Gray Television's virtual duopoly of KPLC-TV and KVHP in Lake Charles collapses onto the stations' shared studio building, causing a partial roof collapse. The personnel of both stations were forced to evacuate from the studio building and relocate to the studios of Baton Rouge sister station WAFB one day earlier, as Lake Charles was under mandatory evacuation orders at the time. While KPLC was able to resume over-the-air operations after the hurricane, KVHP was unable to do so due to the destruction of the link to its transmitter site; as a result, the Fox network launched a Foxnet-like cable-only feed for Southwestern Louisiana cable subscribers in early September, which is scheduled to remain in place for cable subscribers until further notice.	
30	The 2020 MTV Video Music Awards was broadcast live on MTV, its ViacomCBS sister cable networks, and for the first time since 2015 (when MTV2 terminated the last of their broadcast affiliates), was simulcast live on broadcast television over The CW, which is partially owned by ViacomCBS. Originally scheduled as a traditional ceremony staged at Brooklyn's Barclays Center, the ceremony was instead a multi-site outdoor event spread throughout the five Boroughs of New York City due to assembly restrictions.	

== September ==
Date	Event	Source
1	The NBC soap opera Days of Our Lives plans to restart production on this date after production and taping were halted in the spring due to COVID-19 cases in California.	
8	Late Night host Seth Meyers returns to his Rockefeller Center studio for the first time in six months but continues tape his show solo with a small crew and without his house band – whose members continue to perform from their homes via video conferencing – or a live audience.	
10	On the day the National Football League opened its 101st season, Fox Sports 1 personality Skip Bayless draws backlash for comments he made during his Undisputed program about Dallas Cowboys quarterback Dak Prescott openly discussing his battle with depression. "The quarterback of an NFL team is the ultimate leadership position in sports," said Bayless. "You're commanding a lot of young men and some older men, and they're all looking at you to be their CEO, to be in charge of the football team. I don't have sympathy for him going public with, 'I got depressed.'" Fox Sports condemned the remark as "insensitive" in a statement, while Bayless claimed on the following day's show that Prescott should have addressed his mental health issues sooner.	
10	Jeers from the crowd in Kansas City's Arrowhead Stadium are heard on NBC's live opening night broadcast between the Super Bowl champion Chiefs and Houston Texans when the two teams come together at midfield for a moment of unity prior to kickoff. The response to the players' gesture comes amid ongoing controversy regarding the NFL's addressing social issues in the leadup to the U.S. presidential election.	
14	Eight months after winning the Greatest of All Time tournament (see above), Ken Jennings joins Jeopardy! as producer, general ambassador and a presenter of certain categories as part of the show's 37th season in daily syndication. Jennings joins a revamped production staff led by Mike Richards, who is taking over as executive producer of both Jeopardy! and Wheel of Fortune from the retiring Harry Friedman.	
16	The 55th Academy of Country Music Awards aired on CBS from three locations in Nashville: the Grand Ole Opry House, the Ryman Auditorium, and the Bluebird Café, hosted by Keith Urban. Originally scheduled for April 5, the ceremony was postponed on March 15 due to coronavirus-related public assembly restrictions in Las Vegas.	
17	Cheerleading coach and Cheer star Jerry Harris was arrested by the FBI and charged for production of child pornography. After pleading guilty in February 2022, he would be sentenced to 12 years in prison that July, with additional charge of soliciting sex from minors.	
20	The 72nd Primetime Emmy Awards aired on ABC, hosted by Jimmy Kimmel, live in all time zones. The ceremony, originally scheduled to take place at the Microsoft Theater in Downtown Los Angeles, was coordinated instead through videotelephony via the Staples Center between Kimmel, the producers, and nominees. Watchmen was the big winner with 11 awards, the most for a single show, while HBO shows won 30 combined awards, the most for a single network. Additionally, Schitt's Creek becomes the first series to win all seven major awards in a single year and Succession wins in four drama categories.	
21	Fifty years to the day after airing the first Monday Night Football game, ABC simulcasts sister network ESPN's broadcast of the first NFL regular season contest in Las Vegas featuring the Raiders and New Orleans Saints. It also marks ABC's first Monday Night game since ESPN took over the franchise after the 2005 season.	
23	Spoken word poet Brandon Leake was named the fifteenth winner of NBC's reality show America's Got Talent, making him the fourth act advancing via a Golden Buzzer since the introduction in the ninth season to win the season. The season was notable on using a virtual audience as a result of the safe distancing measures to mitigate the ongoing COVID-19 pandemic, and one of the judges, Simon Cowell was absent in his role during the live shows because of a severe back injury; for the first two weeks, singer and the current coach of another NBC show The Voice Kelly Clarkson and television actor comedian Kenan Thompson filed as substitutes for Cowell respectively.	
24	The E. W. Scripps Company announces that it will acquire Ion Television owner Ion Media for $2.65 billion, with a $600 million preferred-stock investment from Berkshire Hathaway.	
24	Conan celebrates Christmas three months early, fearing that the actual holiday would be significantly impacted by the COVID-19 pandemic.	
28	Williamson County, Texas Sheriff and Live PD star Robert Chody has been indicted and arrested for evidence tampering charges after allegedly destroying video evidence of the killing of Javier Ambler in police custody.	
28	The Tampa Bay Lightning defeat the Dallas Stars to win the 2020 Stanley Cup Finals. The series, delayed four months because of the pandemic, was the least watched since 2010.	
29	Chris Wallace of Fox News moderates the first of the 2020 United States presidential debates between President Trump and former Vice President Biden.	

== October ==
Date	Event	Source
1	YouTube TV drops 19 Fox Sports Networks affiliates after its owner Google fails to reach a new carriage deal with Diamond Sports Group.	
7	Susan Page moderates a Vice Presidential debate between California Senator Kamala Harris and Vice President Pence.	
7	Country singer Morgan Wallen is dropped from Saturday Night Live as musical guest for the October 10 episode after video surfaces showing him going mask-free, in violation of the show's COVID-19 protocol. Jack White would perform as musical guest instead of Wallen, who is scheduled to perform on the December 5 episode.	
11	The 2020 NBA playoffs conclude with the Los Angeles Lakers winning the 2020 NBA Finals. The entire tournament took place within a "bubble" setting at the ESPN Wide World of Sports Complex in Lake Buena Vista, Florida, with the Los Angeles Lakers victorious 4–2 over the Miami Heat in the NBA Finals series. It includes a play-in tournament that took place on the 15th and the 16th. The playoffs air as usual on TNT, ESPN, ABC and NBA TV. The bubble is notable as it is the first time the San Antonio Spurs would not qualify for the playoffs for the first time since 1997. This results in the Pittsburgh Penguins of the National Hockey League now holding the longest active playoff streak in any major North American sports league.	
13	Jeopardy! features the sixth instance in the show's history in which only one contestant participates in Final Jeopardy.	
14	The 2020 Billboard Music Awards, held at the Dolby Theatre in Los Angeles, airs on NBC. Kelly Clarkson, for the third consecutive year, serves as host of the ceremony, which was originally scheduled for April 29 at Las Vegas's MGM Grand Garden Arena but postponed due to pandemic-related public assembly restrictions on March 17.	
15	President Trump and Joe Biden participate in dueling town halls. Biden's is hosted by ABC's George Stephanopoulos and Trump's is hosted by NBC's Savannah Guthrie.	
18	Season 22 of Who Wants to Be a Millionaire premiers on ABC with Tiffany Haddish being the first contestant. At the close of the show host Jimmy Kimmel pays tribute to Regis Philbin host of Millionaire from 1999 to 2002 who died on July 24 at the age of 88.	
19	Mike Emrick announces his retirement after 47 years as a sports broadcaster and 15 as lead play-by-play announcer for National Hockey League games on NBC Sports. An eight-time Sports Emmy Award winner and member of the United States Hockey Hall of Fame, Emrick is best known for his work on NHL and Olympic hockey coverage for NBC and NBCSN as well as Fox, CBS, ESPN, and local teams including the New Jersey Devils. Emrick's last assignment for NBC was the concluding game of the 2020 Stanley Cup Finals on September 28.	
20	WildBrain announces that it has signed an exclusive deal with Apple TV+ for the Peanuts television specials and other Peanuts-related content. (Apple TV+ already carries Wildbrain's Snoopy in Space series.) The specials had aired on CBS from 1965 to 2000, and on ABC from 2001 to 2019. A clause in the contract requires Apple TV+ to offer the three major holiday specials It's the Great Pumpkin, Charlie Brown; A Charlie Brown Thanksgiving and A Charlie Brown Christmas for free within a three-day window for each special. In November, Apple announced it would offer the remaining two specials (Great Pumpkin's window had already closed) to PBS and PBS Kids for a single airing each, preserving their traditional over-the-air broadcasts; in accordance with most PBS member stations' non-commercial educational licenses, the specials were televised without commercials for the first time (an underwriting slide for Apple bookended the broadcasts).	
21	The 2020 CMT Music Awards air on CMT.	
22	Kristen Welker of NBC News moderates the final 2020 United States presidential debate.	
23	Hulu Live drops 23 Fox Sports Net affiliates after failing to reach a new carriage deal with owner Diamond Sports Group.	
26	Conan O'Brien reports on his show that his temporary studio at the Coronet Theatre was burglarized over his latest two-week break, with the burglar(s) taking some laptops and a clapperboard.	
27	While testing the station's election results system, Detroit ABC affiliate WXYZ-TV accidentally displays randomly-generated test election results on-air, during The Bachelorette. The station apologizes for the error shortly thereafter.	
27	The 2020 BET Hip Hop Awards are aired.	
28	On CBS, the 22nd season (and second All-Stars) of Big Brother concludes with Cody Calafiore, the runner-up of the 16th season, declared as the winner in the third unanimous Jury vote in the American Big Brother history (the first two being Dan Gheesling of season 10 and Tamar Braxton of the second celebrity season). Calafiore's win marked the first time a perfect game is played in the season (by not receiving eviction nominations for the entire season and received a unanimous jury vote). This season was notably postponed for about six weeks because of the ongoing COVID-19 pandemic, and precautionary measures were applied to ensure the safety of the contestants and crew members, such as disinfecting the house and social distancing, and live episodes were broadcast without studio audiences.	
28	Bryon Rubin is promoted to Chief Operating Officer of CBS Entertainment Group. He will report to Chief Executive Officer George Cheeks and will continue to serve as Chief Financial Officer of the group.	

== November ==
Date	Event	Source
3	Coverage of the 2020 United States presidential election, in which former vice president Joe Biden defeated incumbent president Donald Trump, aired on multiple networks. During the primetime (8:00 to 11:00 p.m. Eastern) hours on cable, over 13.6 million watched Fox News's coverage, while over 9 million saw CNN's broadcast, and over 7.3 million watched MSNBC's telecast. During those same primetime hours on the major broadcast networks, over 6 million watched the coverage on ABC, over 5.6 million tuned into NBC, over 4.3 million watched CBS, and over 3.2 million tuned into Fox.	
6	The finals of the 12th season of American Ninja Warrior competed under the Single-elimination tournament format entitled Power Tower Playoff Bracket, where the top eight finalists compete for a reduced prize of $100,000, down from the previous top prize of $1 million. Daniel Gil, who made it to the finals last year but fell short on "Total Victory" and lost to Drew Drechsel, won the final tournament. This season's format was heavily affected by the COVID-19 pandemic, resulting in the reduction of the format such as filming only held at The Dome at America's Center in St. Louis, Missouri without any audience instead of various cities including the traditional Las Vegas Strip for the national finals, and the distinction award, "Last Ninja Standing" was also absent this season for the first time since its introduction in season nine on 2018.	
8	Long-time Jeopardy! host Alex Trebek dies at the age of 80 following a 19-month battle with stage IV pancreatic cancer, causing the program to suspend production for the second time in ten months. Sony Pictures Television declined to announce Trebek's successor at the time, and announced that the program would continue to air new episodes until January 8, except for a two-week break around the Christmas holiday; the last episodes to air before his death were taped on October 29. The final Trebek-hosted episode that aired on January 8 included a farewell segment that was taped before he was initially diagnosed with pancreatic cancer back in March 2019.	
9	Sheila Ducksworth became the president of the CBS/NAACP Production Venture.	
11	The 54th Country Music Association Awards, held at the Music City Center in Nashville, Tennessee, aired on ABC with Reba McEntire and Darius Rucker as the hosts. Charley Pride was honored with the Willie Nelson Lifetime Achievement Award.	
15	The 46th People's Choice Awards, held at the Barker Hangar in Santa Monica, California, aired on E! with Demi Lovato as the host. Jennifer Lopez was honored with the Icon Award. Tyler Perry was honored with the People's Champion Award. Tracee Ellis Ross was honored with the Fashion Icon Award.	
17	WarnerMedia announces that Conan O'Brien will end his self-titled talk show in June 2021, ending a more than 10-year run on TBS. O'Brien debuted the show in November 2010 following his exit from NBC earlier that year. WarnerMedia also announces that O'Brien signed a deal with HBO Max for a new weekly variety series.	
17	Sinclair Broadcast Group announces that it has signed a ten-year partnership with casino operator Bally's Corporation. Under the deal, Bally's will receive marketing access across Sinclair's stations. The Fox Sports Networks, which Sinclair acquired in 2019 from Disney after Disney's acquisition of 21st Century Fox, will also be rebranded under Bally's name.	
22	The 48th American Music Awards, held at the Microsoft Theater in Los Angeles, aired on ABC with Taraji P. Henson as the host.	
23	Ken Jennings is named as the chairman of the interim hosting team of Jeopardy!, who will assume the role that was vacated by Alex Trebek's death for the remainder of the show's 37th season beginning with the episode that will air on January 11, 2021 (with production of the show resuming on November 30). Jennings himself will host the first few weeks of episodes that will be produced after Trebek's death, with future special guest hosts expected to be announced at a later date.	
26	The Macy's Thanksgiving Day Parade was held as a dramatically reformatted made-for-television event, with NBC holding exclusive rights. The parade route was confined to within a block of Herald Square in front of the Macy's home store, with the signature balloons towed by vehicles instead of by the dozens of human handlers during typical parade, and no marching bands. Portions of the parade, which had no live in-person spectators, were pre-recorded. CBS carried a "best of" collection of footage from previous parades, as their 'unofficial' parade-viewing point outside of the CBS Building has no view of Herald Square.	
29	David Chang participated and won the $1 million top prize in Who Wants to Be a Millionaire, making him the first celebrity contestant to win the top prize, and donated that prize money to his charity of his choice, Southern Smoke Foundation.	
30	The eleventh edition of CMA Country Christmas aired on ABC with Thomas Rhett and Lauren Akins as the hosts.	
30	For breaching critical COVID-19 protocols as stated by NBC, Ryan Gallager was forced to withdraw from the ongoing season of The Voice, after sharing an Instagram story of his mother's hospitalization who contracted COVID-19 hours prior to the episode's broadcast. During the episode broadcast, host Carson Daly did not state any reason nor references of his withdrawal, but his reason was publicly made known a day later. Gallager was one of the four artists who was selected by his coach Kelly Clarkson to compete for the final spot in the Top 17 via a public vote entitled "Four-way Knockout"; due to his withdrawal, the public vote results were changed to accommodate to the remaining three artists who competed for the Four-way Knockout.	

== December ==
Date	Event	Source
1	DirecTV removes 64 Tegna-owned stations after refusing to reach a new deal between the company and the provider. The dispute ended on December 20.	
1	The Young and the Restless broadcasts its 12,000th episode.	
1	Dish Network removes 164 stations, and WGN America, all owned by Nexstar Media Group following a contract dispute. The dispute is resolved on December 25.	
2	Sting makes his All Elite Wrestling (AEW) debut after a tag team match that pitted Cody Rhodes and Darby Allin against Powerhouse Hobbs and Ricky Starks at Winter Is Coming. This is Sting's first appearance on TNT since the final episode of WCW Monday Nitro on March 26, 2001. It is later announced that Sting had signed a multi-year contract with AEW.	
6	WWE Tribute to the Troops returned to television after a one-year hiatus and aired on Fox.	
10	The Time Person of the Year special airs in primetime on NBC, the first time it airs in that form rather than an announcement during a network morning show, as had been done since the beginning of the 21st century.	
16	America's Next Top Model season 21 runner-up Will Jardell and his boyfriend James Wallington won the 32nd season of CBS's show The Amazing Race and immediately proposed at the Finish Line located at the Mercedes-Benz Superdome, making them the third gay couple team to win the race, after Reichen Lehmkuhl and Chip Arndt (4th season) and Josh Kilmer-Purcell and Brent Ridge (21st season). This season was notable for its initial postponement from early May until October 14 as a result of filling up the fall season broadcast for some CBS shows (notably the 41st season of Survivor), which were all postponed due to the ongoing COVID-19 pandemic, resulting in a long gap between its filming completion and its premiere at 22 months after the filming was held from November 10, 2018 and ended on December 3. The race also surpassed one million miles travelled during the lifetime of the entire series since its inception season in 2001.	
19	Jim Carrey announces on Twitter that he will no longer play Joe Biden on Saturday Night Live, saying "Though my term was only meant to be 6 weeks, I was thrilled to be elected as your SNL President...comedy’s highest call of duty. I would love to go forward knowing that Biden was the victor because I nailed that shit. But I am just one in a long line of proud, fighting SNL Bidens!". Cast member Alex Moffat plays Biden on that night's episode.	
27	After 20 years on the air, PBS' contract to air the Canadian animated preschool series Caillou expires and the show is taken off PBS Kids. In August 2021, Caillou would find a new home on Cartoon Network as part of the channel’s new block, Cartoonito.	
31	The New York's midnight Times Square ball drop, which usually attracts large crowds for the end of the year, was largely re-formatted as a smaller virtual experience, with a small group of celebrants (mainly medical and first responders) handling the ceremony and much less entertainment. ABC's plans for New Year's Rockin' Eve mostly remained the same from most years, including New Orleans elements and recorded musical performances from a Los Angeles soundstage taped in mid-December with spread-out crowds. Other networks such as Univision (Feliz) and the Fox broadcast network, NBC, and CNN (New Year's Eve Live) made appropriate adjustments for their live coverage, while Fox News Channel aired taped retrospective programming instead.	

== See also ==
- 2020 deaths in American television
