= 2020 deaths in American television =

The following deaths of notable individuals related to American television occurred in 2020.

== January ==
Date	Name	Age	Notability	Source
January 1	David Stern	77	Commissioner of the National Basketball Association from 1984 to 2014 who oversaw the launches of NBA TV and NBA League Pass.	
January 1	Barry ZeVan	82	American television weathercaster at Minneapolis–St. Paul stations KARE and KSTP-TV and Washington, D.C. station WJLA-TV	
January 3	Robert Blanche	57	American film and television actor best known as Patrick Bonanno on Leverage	
January 7	Silvio Horta	45	American film and television writer (co-creator of Ugly Betty; creator of Jake 2.0 and The Chronicle)	
January 8	Buck Henry	89	American actor, comedian, producer, writer, and director (co-creator and writer for Get Smart, Captain Nice and Quark; regular on The New Steve Allen Show and That Was The Week That Was, recurring guest host on Saturday Night Live, guest roles in Murphy Brown and Will and Grace, and recurring roles on 30 Rock and Hot in Cleveland)	
January 8	Edd Byrnes	87	American actor/singer, best known for playing Kookie on 77 Sunset Strip	
January 9	Lan O'Kun	87	American screenwriter, playwright, lyricist and composer (Love, American Style, Apple's Way, Insight, Small Wonder, The Love Boat, The Twilight Zone, Star Trek: The Next Generation and Highway to Heaven)	
January 10	Michael Greene	86	American actor (Wanted Dead or Alive, Cheyenne, The Dakotas, Batman, Gunsmoke, Kung Fu, The Dukes of Hazzard, Fantasy Island, The A-Team, All My Children, The Twilight Zone, The Fall Guy, The Colbys, LBJ: The Early Years, Quantum Leap, Hunter, Melrose Place, Baywatch)	
January 11	Stan Kirsch	51	American actor, screenwriter, director, and acting coach.	
January 11	Norma Michaels	95	American character actress (All My Children, One Life to Live, Santa Barbara, The King of Queens, Baywatch, Bewitched, Guiding Light, General Hospital)	
January 12	William Bogert	83	American actor, best known for his semi-regular role as Brandon Brindle on Small Wonder, Kent Wallace from Chappelle's Show's Frontline spoofs, William Bellamy in Centennial, and the "Confessions of a Republican" ad for Lyndon B. Johnson in the 1964 U.S. presidential election (and later on reprised the role for Hillary Clinton's 2016 campaign)	
January 15	Rocky Johnson	75	WWE Hall of Fame professional wrestler; father of Dwayne "The Rock" Johnson.	
January 18	Jack Van Impe	88	American televangelist, host of Jack Van Impe Presents	
January 19	Gene London	88	American children's show host and puppeteer at WCAU/Philadelphia, New York City stations WABD and WABC-TV, and NBC	
January 20	Len Goorian	100	Longtime producer and Hall of Fame broadcaster at WCPO-TV in Cincinnati	
January 22	Sonny Grosso	89	American film producer, television producer, and NYPD detective (A Family for Joe, True Blue, Top Cops, The Big Easy)	
January 23	Jim Lehrer	85	American television journalist (anchor of PBS NewsHour from 1975 to 2011 and co-creator of the program, moderator of twelve United States presidential debates from 1988 to 2012)	
January 23	Tyler Gwozdz	29	American entrepreneur and contestant on season 15 of The Bachelorette	
January 25	Carleton Sheets	80	American real estate investor and infomercial pitchman	
January 26	Leo Fernández III	60	Puerto Rican reporter and paparazzo, worked at WKAQ-TV, WAPA-TV, WLII and WJPX	
January 26	Kobe Bryant	41	American Oscar-winning and Olympic Gold medalist basketball player (Los Angeles Lakers), author, producer, and documentarian. (Contributor for NBA TV programs and specials; guest appearances on General Hospital, All That, Sister, Sister and Ridiculousness; commercial work included Sprite, McDonald's, Nutella, Nike, and Nintendo)	
January 27	Jack Burns	86	American actor, comedian, writer, and voice actor (regular role as Deputy Sheriff Warren Ferguson on The Andy Griffith Show, voice roles as Ralph Kane in Wait Till Your Father Gets Home, and Sid the Squid in Animaniacs, co-host of The Burns and Schreiber Comedy Hour, writer for Hee Haw and The Muppet Show, co-writer/recurring regular on Fridays, guest hosted Saturday Night Live, and the voice of Larry, one half of the crash test dummies in the Ad Council's seat belt advertising campaign.	
January 28	Marj Dusay	83	American actress best known as the second Alexandra Spaulding on Guiding Light, Monica Warner on The Facts of Life, a co-starring role on All My Children, and a guest starring role as Kara in the Star Trek episode "Spock's Brain".	
January 30	Fred Silverman	82	American television executive with all of the Big Three television networks between 1963 and 1981 (vice president of CBS from 1970 to 1975, president of ABC from 1975 to 1978 and president of NBC from 1978 to 1981); founder of The Fred Silverman Company. Also producer on Scooby-Doo, The Waltons, Charlie's Angels, Rich Man, Poor Man, Roots, and Shōgun, and executive producer of Matlock.	
January 31	Anne Cox Chambers	100	American media proprietor (Cox Enterprises), daughter of James M. Cox	

== February ==
Date	Name	Age	Notability	Source
February 3	Bob Griffin	85	Longtime Ark-La-Tex television sports and news anchor (KSLA, KTBS-TV)	
February 4	Gene Reynolds	96	Longtime television producer and director (M*A*S*H, Lou Grant)	
February 5	Kevin Conway	77	American actor and film director	
February 5	Kirk Douglas	103	American actor (TV work includes guest spots on The Jack Benny Program, The Johnny Cash Show, Tales from the Crypt, The Simpsons, Touched by an Angel, and Saturday Night Live; and the television films Dr. Jekyll and Mr. Hyde (1973), Victory at Entebbe, Mousey, Draw!, Amos, Queenie, The Secret, Take Me Home Again, and Empire State Building Murders)	
February 7	Orson Bean	91	American actor, comedian, panelist, and activist (best known for his role in The Twilight Zone episode "Mr. Bevis", regular roles on Doctor Quinn, Medicine Woman and Desperate Housewives, recurring roles in Mary Hartman, Mary Hartman and The Facts of Life, game show appearances include To Tell the Truth, Match Game, and Super Password, guest appearances include Superstore, Hot in Cleveland and Grace & Frankie)	
February 8	Robert Conrad	84	American actor best known as James T. West in The Wild Wild West and Tom Lopaka on Hawaiian Eye. Also starred on The D.A., Assignment Vienna, Centennial, and Baa Baa Black Sheep.	
February 8	Paula Kelly	77	American actress, singer, dancer and choreographer	
February 10	Marge Redmond	95	American actress, notable for her role/narration as Sister Jacqueline on The Flying Nun and Sarah Tucker in several Cool Whip commercials.	
February 14	Lynn Cohen	86	American actress best known as Magda on Sex and the City and Judge Elizabeth Mizener on Law & Order	
February 16	Jason Davis	35	American actor best known as the voice of Mikey Blumberg on Recess	
February 16	Kellye Nakahara	72–73	American actress, best known for playing Nurse Kealani Kellye in M*A*S*H	
February 17	Ja'Net DuBois	87	Actress best known as Willona Woods on Good Times, Florence Avery on The PJs, and Grandma Ellington on The Wayans Bros. Also sang The Jeffersons theme song.	
February 19	Bob Cobert	95	American composer (composed theme songs to Dark Shadows, Password, Blockbusters, Chain Reaction and many others)	
February 20	Sy Sperling	78	American consumer products executive, founder and spokesman of Hair Club	
February 22	B. Smith	70	American model, publisher, author, lifestyle designer, chef, and television personality (host of B. Smith With Style, and made two appearances on Mister Rogers' Neighborhood)	
February 25	Lee Phillip Bell	91	American television producer (The Bold and the Beautiful, The Young and the Restless)	

== March ==
Date	Name	Age	Notability	Source
March 2	James Lipton	93	American actor, writer, and host of Inside the Actors Studio. Other television credits include The Simpsons, Arrested Development, and Glee; guest starring on The Young and the Restless, The Bold and the Beautiful, As the World Turns, and Guiding Light	
March 3	Bobbie Battista	67	Anchor for WRAL-TV/Raleigh, North Carolina, CNN, and HLN; host of CNN's TalkBack Live	
March 3	Roscoe Born	69	American actor and songwriter (One Life to Live, Santa Barbara, The Young and the Restless)	
March 6	Danny Tidwell	35	American jazz dancer; runner-up of the third season of So You Think You Can Dance	
March 9	Lorenzo Brino	21	American child actor (7th Heaven)	
March 13	Arch Deal	88	American television reporter at WFLA-TV, WLCY-TV and WTVT in the Tampa Bay area	
March 16	Stuart Whitman	92	American actor (starred in Cimarron Strip, guest starring in Loving, All My Children, One Life to Live, and General Hospital)	
March 17	Lyle Waggoner	84	American actor; announced The Carol Burnett Show from 1967 to 1974 and portrayed Steve Trevor on Wonder Woman	
March 20	Kenny Rogers	81	American country music singer-songwriter and actor. Star of several television films including those based on his song "The Gambler"; guest appearances included Daniel Watkins on Dr. Quinn, Medicine Woman, Denny Byle on Touched by an Angel, and a Kindly Book Narrator on How I Met Your Mother	
March 24	Richard S. Kline	79	American game show producer (Break the Bank and Strike It Rich as sole producer; Win, Lose or Draw and 3rd Degree collaborating with Bert Convy, and several collaborations with Jack Barry)	
March 24	William Dufris	62	American actor (Bob the Builder)	
March 25	Mark Blum	69	American actor (Sweet Surrender, Mozart in the Jungle, You)	
March 26	Curly Neal	77	American basketball player and entertainer. Member of The Harlem Globetrotters (1963–85) during its tenure that included lending his voice to the Harlem Globetrotters and The Super Globetrotters cartoon series, appearing in The Harlem Globetrotters Popcorn Machine, and co-starring in The Harlem Globetrotters on Gilligan's Island, among his credits.	
March 28	John Callahan	66	American actor (All My Children, Falcon Crest, Days of Our Lives)	
March 31	Julie Bennett	88	American actress, voice actress. (The Yogi Bear Show, McHale's Navy, Cattanooga Cats, Spider-Man) Best known as the voice of Hanna-Barbera's Cindy Bear on The Yogi Bear Show and its feature-film spin-off, Yogi's Treasure Hunt, Yogi and the Invasion of the Space Bears and The New Yogi Bear Show.	

== April ==
Date	Name	Age	Notability	Source
April 1	Adam Schlesinger	52	American musician (Fountains of Wayne, Ivy, Tinted Windows, and Fever High) and songwriter (television work includes T.U.F.F. Puppy, Crazy Ex-Girlfriend, Big Time Rush, and Sesame Street). Three-time Emmy-winner (2012, 2013, 2019), and Grammy-winner (2010).	
April 3	Logan Williams	16	Canadian actor (The Whispers, The Flash, When Calls the Heart, Supernatural)	
April 4	Forrest Compton	94	American actor (The Edge of Night, Gomer Pyle – USMC, The F.B.I.)	
April 6	James Drury	85	Actor best known as the title character of The Virginian	
April 6	Al Kaline	85	American Hall of Fame baseball player, broadcaster, and executive, all for the Detroit Tigers. Served as the Tigers television color commentator from 1975 to 2002.	
April 7	Hal Willner	64	Music producer (Saturday Night Live)	
April 7	Herb Stempel	93	Game show contestant most famous for blowing the whistle on the scripted game show Twenty-One, beginning the 1950s quiz show scandals. Was portrayed by John Turturro in Quiz Show.	
April 8	Rick May	79	Canadian actor and theatrical performer (Child in the Night)	
April 12	Danny Goldman	80	American actor known as the voice of Brainy Smurf from The Smurfs	
April 14	Gary Drapcho	63	Longtime sports anchor at WICU-TV and WSEE-TV in Erie	
April 15	Willie Davis	85	Professional football player (Green Bay Packers, Cleveland Browns), broadcaster (founder of All Pro Broadcasting), and color commentator for NFL on NBC; father of actor Duane Davis	
April 15	Brian Dennehy	81	Actor (recurring roles on several series including The Fighting Fitzgeralds, Public Morals, The Blacklist, Hap and Leonard, and Star of the Family). Golden Globe winner for his role as Willy Loman in the 2000 television film Death of a Salesman.	
April 16	Mike Buchanan	78	Longtime television journalist at WUSA and WJLA-TV in Washington, DC	
April 16	Gene Deitch	95	American expatriate animator (television work included several adaptations of King Features Syndicate comics such as Popeye, Beetle Bailey and Krazy Kat)	
April 16	Howard Finkel	69	Longtime WWE Hall of Fame ring announcer	
April 16	Eugene Kane	63	American journalist (Milwaukee Journal Sentinel) and commentator (Alumnus of WTMJ-TV and host of Black Nouveau on WMVS/WMVT from 2002 to 2006)	
April 20	Tom Lester	81	American actor, businessman, and evangelist, best known for his role as Eb Dawson on Green Acres, and was the last original surviving cast member of the 1965–71 sitcom.	
April 21	Mike Anderson	67	Anchorman, reporter, and commentator for WISN-TV Milwaukee (and its sister Hearst Television outlets) from 1981 to 2017; also an alumnus of KIRO-TV Seattle and an R&B singer.	
April 21	Jerry Bishop	84	Voice over announcer best known for his work on Judge Judy. Also worked for The Cross-Wits, Dick Clark's Live Wednesday, Disney Channel, ABC, NBC, and commercials for Budweiser, Burger King, and Coors.	
April 21	Dimitri Diatchenko	52	Character actor (brief recurring roles on General Hospital, Sons of Anarchy, and Teenage Mutant Ninja Turtles, and guest spots on numerous shows).	
April 22	Shirley Knight	83	Actress (recurring roles in Buckskin, Maggie Winters, and Desperate Housewives)	
April 24	Mark Farrell	55	News director at KTEN in Ada-Sherman	
April 25	Willie Dixon	52	Photojournalist at KTRK-TV in Houston	
April 27	Ashley Ross	34	American reality show contestant (Little Women: Atlanta)	
April 28	Ed Carter	81	Longtime television journalist at WIS in Columbia, SC	
April 28	John Mercer	56	News anchor/reporter at WDEF-TV in Chattanooga	
April 30	Sam Lloyd	56	American actor, singer, and musician (Scrubs, Cougar Town)	

== May ==
Date	Name	Age	Notability	Source
May 9	Little Richard	87	American musician and actor (credits include Bill & Ted's Excellent Adventures, Mother Goose Rock 'n' Rhyme, Columbo, Full House, Baywatch, The Drew Carey Show, and The Simpsons; film role in Goddess of Love, promos for Jenny Jones; numerous appearances on WWE shows; performed theme song to The Magic School Bus; commercial work for Nike)	
May 10	Betty Wright	66	Grammy Award-winning American singer/songwriter (Clean Up Woman), and producer (musical appearances include Soul Train, American Bandstand, Don Kirshner's Rock Concert, The Mike Douglas Show and Late Night with Jimmy Fallon, guest appearances on The Mo'Nique Show and Magic City, served as a mentor to Danity Kane on Making the Band, and was profiled on Unsung the previous April; her music and sampled vocals were used on numerous television series, music videos, and specials, resulting in lawsuits due to copyrighting infringement and unauthorized use of her music)	
May 11	Jerry Stiller	92	American comedian (Stiller and Meara) and actor best known as Frank Costanza on Seinfeld and Arthur Spooner on The King of Queens. Also recurring roles on Joe and Sons, Tattingers, Fish Hooks, and Teacher's Pet. Father of Ben Stiller and husband of Anne Meara.	
May 11	Hutton Gibson	101	American expatriate sedevacantist and game show contestant, winner of the 1968 Jeopardy! Tournament of Champions. Father of actors Mel Gibson and Donal Gibson.	
May 14	Phyllis George	70	American businesswoman, actress, presenter/host and sportscaster (co-host of The NFL Today and numerous programs for CBS Sports, anchor of CBS Morning News, co-host of Candid Camera, host of television versions of People and Women's Day. Winner of Miss Texas 1970, Miss America 1971, and the First Lady of Kentucky Governor John Y. Brown Jr. from 1979 to 1983)	
May 15	Fred Willard	86	American comedian, actor, presenter, and writer (regular roles on Fernwood 2 Night/America 2-Night, Real People, Sirota's Court, D.C. Follies, A Minute with Stan Hooper and Maybe It's Me; recurring roles on Modern Family, Everybody Loves Raymond, The Bold and the Beautiful, Roseanne, Mad About You and Family Matters; guest roles include Get Smart, Campus Ladies, Pushing Daisies, Murphy Brown, The Bob Newhart Show, and Laverne & Shirley; voice work include The Simpsons, Buzz Lightyear of Star Command, The Grim Adventures of Billy & Mandy, Dexter's Laboratory, Family Guy and The Loud House)	
May 16	Frank Bielec	72	Home renovation designer (Trading Spaces)	
May 16	Lynn Shelton	54	American actress, writer, director and producer (production credits include New Girl, The Mindy Project, Fresh Off the Boat, Love, GLOW, Dickinson and Little Fires Everywhere; both acting and producer on Maron with partner Marc Maron)	
May 17	Shad Gaspard	39	American wrestler, novelist, and actor, who was part of the WWE tag team duo Cryme Tyme (credits include Big Time Rush, Key and Peele, The Game, and From Dusk till Dawn: The Series; his body was found on May 20)	
May 18	Ken Osmond	76	American actor, author, and officer with the Los Angeles Police Department, best known for playing Eddie Haskell on Leave It to Beaver and The New Leave It to Beaver; his near-fatal attack from a carjacker he helped convict in 1980 was recreated for an episode of Top Cops	
May 19	Hagen Mills	34	American actor (Baskets)	
May 26	Richard Herd	87	American actor (recurring roles on T. J. Hooker, Seinfeld, seaQuest DSV, and Star Trek: Voyager and the miniseries V and its sequel V The Final Battle)	
May 26	Anthony James	77	American character actor who specialized in playing villains in films and television, many of them Westerns.	
May 29	Rob Andringa	51	Former Wisconsin Badgers men's ice hockey player and hockey analyst for Wisconsin Public Television and Big Ten Network	

== June ==
Date	Name	Age	Notability	Source
June 1	Lee Grosscup	83	Football player and sportscaster (ABC)	
June 2	Chris Trousdale	34	American actor/singer, and former member of the group Dream Street (television work includes Days of Our Lives, Shake It Up, Austin & Ally and Lucifer. Auditioned for The Voice in 2012)	
June 2	Mary Pat Gleason	70	Actress and writer best known as Jane Hogan on Guiding Light which she also wrote for. Also recurring roles on The Middleman, General Hospital, Days of Our Lives, and Mom. Emmy winner (1986).	
June 3	Jimmy Capps	81	American guitarist, member of The Nashville A-Team (member of the Larry's Country Diner and Grand Ole Opry house bands)	
June 9	Dick Johnson	66	News anchor/reporter at KDFW/Dallas and WMAQ-TV and WLS-TV/Chicago	
June 10	Jas Waters	39	Writer (This is Us, Kidding, Hood Adjacent With James Davis, The Breaks)	
June 10	Ann Varnum	80	Longtime morning host at WTVY-TV/Dothan, AL	
June 11	Mel Winkler	78	Actor best known as Dr. Simon Harris on The Doctors. Also recurring voice roles on Oswald and The New Batman Adventures	
June 18	James Henerson	84	Writer (I Dream of Jeannie, Bewitched, Attica) and producer (Starman, The Fire Next Time)	
June 24	Lester Crystal	85	American news executive (PBS NewsHour, NBC Nightly News), president of NBC News (1977–1979)	
June 27	Linda Cristal	89	Argentine actress (lone regular role in American television was Victoria Cannon in The High Chaparral)	
June 29	Johnny Mandel	94	American composer who co-wrote "Suicide is Painless", the theme song to M*A*S*H	
June 29	Carl Reiner	98	Actor, writer, director and producer, best known as the creator of The Dick Van Dyke Show on which he also had a recurring role as Alan Brady. Also recurring roles/guest spots on Good Heavens, Father of the Pride, Your Show of Shows, Caesar's Hour, and Rowan & Martin's Laugh-In. Nine-time Emmy winner.	

== July ==
Date	Name	Age	Notability	Source
July 1	Hugh Downs	99	American television personality best known as the host of 20/20 and The Today Show. Other roles include the sidekick/announcer on Tonight Starring Jack Paar and the host of Concentration.	
July 4	Brandis Kemp	76	American actress (television work includes Fridays, AfterMASH, Faerie Tale Theatre, and The New Lassie)	
July 5	Bettina Gilois	58	German-American author and screenwriter (television work includes the movies Bessie, The Lost Wife of Robert Durst, Mahalia, and A Million Miles Away and the series Andy Warhol's Fifteen Minutes and Muscle Shoals) Emmy winner (2015)	
July 5	Nick Cordero	41	Canadian actor (television work includes guest spots on Blue Bloods, Law & Order: Special Victims Unit, Lilyhammer, and Queer as Folk)	
July 6	Charlie Daniels	83	Grammy Award-winning musician/songwriter (television credits include The Fall Guy, Fox NFL Sunday, Super Bowl XXXIX Pregame Show, Dinner: Impossible, King of the Hill, Murder, She Wrote, and Veggietales; commercial work for GEICO)	
July 8	Naya Rivera	33	American actress/singer (Glee); her body was found July 13.	
July 10	Morris Cerullo	88	American televangelist (host of Victory Today), founder of The Inspiration Network	
July 10	Dick Williams	92	American television/radio personality, weatherman, and magician, best known for hosting Magicland on WMC-TV Memphis from 1966 to 1989.	
July 12	Jane Gardner	68	Anchorwoman at WTKR and WVEC Norfolk, and WTVR-TV Richmond; reporter at WSLS Roanoke	
July 12	Kelly Preston	57	American actress; wife of John Travolta (For Love and Honor, Hawaii Five-0 and Magnum PI)	
July 12	Joanna Cole	75	Author of The Magic School Bus books, which became a television series of the same name.	
July 13	Grant Imahara	49	Electrical engineer and robotics technician best known as the co-host of MythBusters. Also hosted White Rabbit Project and created The Late Late Show with Craig Ferguson robot sidekick Geoff Peterson and worked on the Energizer Bunny.	
July 14	Galyn Görg	55	Actress best known as Lt. Leora Maxwell on M.A.N.T.I.S.. Guest starred on Guiding Light, Transformers: Rescue Bots, Chicago Fire, Transformers: Rescue Bots Academy, General Hospital, Bewitched, Back to the Future, Days of Our Lives, and The Fresh Prince of Bel-Air.	
July 14	Bob Johnson	73	Longtime anchorman at WTVC in Chattanooga from 1975 to 2007	
July 16	Phyllis Somerville	76	American actress (Law & Order, NYPD Blue, Sex and the City, Homicide: Life on the Street, The Sopranos, Third Watch, Law & Order: Criminal Intent, Kidnapped, CSI: Miami, Fringe, The Big C, Elementary, The Blacklist, Blue Bloods, Daredevil, The Good Wife, Outsiders, Madam Secretary)	
July 17	John Lewis	80	American Civil Rights Leader (the last of the "Big Six" activists), Congressman, author, and narrator. A member of the Democratic Party, serving as a U.S. representative for Georgia's 5th congressional district from 1987 until his death, and as the dean of the Georgia congressional delegation. Television credits include voice work in the Arthur episode "Arthur Takes a Stand"; contributing appearance in the documentary Bobby Kennedy for President, and John Lewis: Get In the Way; cameo appearance in the music video for Young Jeezy's song "My President".	
July 17	Shirley Love	87	American politician and broadcaster at WOAY-TV/Oak Hill, West Virginia from 1954 to 1997	
July 19	Nina Kapur	26	News reporter at WCBS-TV in New York City, WDVM-TV in Hagerstown, Maryland, and News 12 Networks	
July 23	Mike Adams	55	American conservative columnist and professor (guest appearances on Hannity, The O'Reilly Factor, The Kelly File, Glenn Beck Program, and The 700 Club)	
July 23	Jerry Taft	77	Longtime meteorologist at KMOL-TV in San Antonio from 1976 to 1977, WMAQ-TV from 1977 to 1984 and WLS-TV in Chicago from 1984 to 2018	
July 24	Rene Carpenter	92	Newspaper columnist and television personality (Everywoman, Nine in the Morning). Portrayed by Yvonne Strahovski in The Astronaut Wives Club. Wife of Mercury Seven astronaut Scott Carpenter.	
July 25	Regis Philbin	88	Television personality best known as the co-host of WABC-TV's The Morning Show which became the nationally syndicated Live with Regis and Kathie Lee and later Live! with Regis and Kelly. Also the first host of Who Wants to Be a Millionaire, America's Got Talent and Million Dollar Password, the sidekick/announcer on The Joey Bishop Show, eponymous host of That Regis Philbin Show! (succeeding Steve Allen) and a record 136 guest appearances on Late Show with David Letterman.	
July 25	John Saxon	83	Character actor (recurring roles/guest spots on Gunsmoke, Burke's Law, Bob Hope Presents the Chrysler Theatre, Bonanza, Ironside, The Virginian, The Six Million Dollar Man, Wonder Woman, Fantasy Island, Scarecrow and Mrs. King, Murder, She Wrote, and several TV movies).	
July 25	Olivia de Havilland	104	Actress (television work includes ABC Stage 67, The Screaming Woman, Roots: The Next Generations, Murder Is Easy (1982), The Royal Romance of Charles and Diana, North and South Book II: Love and War, and Anastasia: The Mystery of Anna)	
July 26	Edmund Ansin	84	American billionaire, philanthropist, and broadcaster, owner/founder of Sunbeam Television	
July 26	Michael Mandell	?	Actor (guest spots on Person of Interest, NYC 22, Glee, The Rosie O'Donnell Show, Ed, Law & Order: Special Victims Unit, Ugly Betty and Guiding Light)	
July 26	Charlie Balducci	44	Reality television personality (True Life).	
July 27	Beckie Mullen	55	American actress and wrestler, best known as Sally The Farmer's Daughter on Gorgeous Ladies of Wrestling	
July 28	Reese Schonfeld	88	Television executive, first president of CNN (1980–82), founder of Food Network	
July 28	John Ivanic	52	Former news anchor at WCMH-TV in Columbus	
July 31	Alan Parker	76	Oscar and Golden Globe-winning British film/television producer, director, and writer, whose 1980 musical drama Fame was later adapted into a 1982–87 series of the same name, a sequel and a reality based competition program.	

== August ==
Date	Name	Age	Notability	Source
August 1	Wilford Brimley	85	Actor and longtime spokesman for the Quaker Oats Company and Liberty Medical; regular role as Gus Witherspoon on Our House, recurring role on The Waltons, and several television films.	
August 1	Reni Santoni	82	American actor (The Trials of O'Brien, Hawk, Love, American Style, The Odd Couple, The F.B.I., Owen Marshall, Counselor at Law, Barnaby Jones, Lou Grant, Hawaii Five-O, The Rockford Files, Charlie's Angels, CHiPs, Manimal, Scarecrow and Mrs. King, Hardcastle and McCormick, Hill Street Blues, Sanchez of Bel Air, Miami Vice, Midnight Caller, Quantum Leap, Murder, She Wrote, Walker, Texas Ranger, NYPD Blue, Murder One, Seinfeld, CSI: Crime Scene Investigation, Franklin & Bash)	
August 4	Dick Goddard	89	American meteorologist on WJW/Cleveland for over 50 years. Also writer and cartoonist.	
August 10	Raymond Allen	91	Actor (recurring roles on Good Times, Sanford and Son, Sanford Arms and Starsky & Hutch. Also guest spots on The Jeffersons, What's Happening!! and The Love Boat).	
August 11	Sumner Redstone	97	Television executive, patriarch of the family that owns ViacomCBS	
August 14	Ash Christian	35	Actor, director and producer. Emmy winner (2014)	
August 14	Linda Manz	58	Actress (Dorothy, Orphan Train, Faerie Tale Theatre)	
August 18	Ben Cross	72	British actor (American television work includes recurring roles on Dark Shadows and Banshee and a voice role on Randy Cunningham: 9th Grade Ninja)	
August 20	Chi Chi DeVayne	34	American drag queen (appeared on season 8 of RuPaul's Drag Race and season 3 of RuPaul's Drag Race All Stars)	
August 23	Lori Nelson	87	Actress best known as Greta Hanson on How to Marry a Millionaire	
August 26	Joe Ruby	87	American animation producer and writer, co-founder and namesake of Ruby-Spears Productions, also contributed to Hanna-Barbera (most famously co-creating Scooby-Doo), Sid and Marty Krofft, and DePatie-Freleng Enterprises	
August 28	Chadwick Boseman	43	Actor (guest spots on Law & Order, CSI: NY, ER and Castle)	
August 28	David S. Cass Sr.	78	American film director and stuntman	
August 29	Clifford Robinson	53	American basketball player and reality show participant (Survivor: Cagayan)	
August 30	Ric Drasin	76	American bodybuilder, personal trainer, actor, stuntman, author, and professional wrestler	
August 31	Norm Spencer	62	Canadian voice actor best known as Cyclops on X-Men: The Animated Series	
August 31	Tom Seaver	75	Major League Baseball pitcher and color commentator, most prominently on WPIX for the New York Yankees from 1989 to 1993, and the New York Mets from 1999 to 2005.	

== September ==
Date	Name	Age	Notability	Source
September 1	Sue C. Nichols	55	American artist	
September 6	Kevin Dobson	77	Actor best known as Detective Bobby Crocker on Kojak and M. Patrick "Mack" MacKenzie on Knots Landing. Also recurring roles on F/X: The Series, The Bold and the Beautiful, Days of Our Lives, Shannon, and The Doctors.	
September 6	Mike Sexton	72	American Hall of Fame poker player and commentator for the World Poker Tour.	
September 9	Stevie Lee Richardson	54	Dwarf wrestler, co-founder of the Half Pint Brawlers hardcore midget wrestling circuit	
September 10	Diana Rigg	82	English actress (American television roles included Diana, Game of Thrones and Penn Zero: Part-Time Hero; host of Mystery!; her signature role as Emma Peel in The Avengers was widely seen in syndication in America)	
September 20	Michael Chapman	84	American cinematographer and film director	
September 27	Kevin Burns	65	Television producer, director and writer best known for Ancient Aliens, Biography, The Curse of Oak Island and dozens of other shows.	
September 28	Gene Corman	93	American film producer and agent. He is the younger brother of Roger Corman	
September 29	Mac Davis	78	Country music singer, songwriter, actor. Host of The Mac Davis Show and recurring roles on The Client, King of the Hill, and Rodney.	
September 29	Helen Reddy	78	Singer and actor. Host of The Helen Reddy Show and The Midnight Special and several guest appearances on The Tonight Show Starring Johnny Carson, The Mike Douglas Show, and The Carol Burnett Show.	

== October ==
Date	Name	Age	Notability	Source
October 2	Edward S. Feldman	91	American film and television producer	
October 3	Thomas Jefferson Byrd	70	American character actor	
October 3	Armelia McQueen	68	American actress (Adventures in Wonderland, Hart of Dixie)	
October 4	Clark Middleton	63	Actor (recurring roles on The Blacklist, Twin Peaks, The Path, and Fringe)	
October 7	Tom Kennedy	93	Game show host (Name That Tune, Split Second, and You Don't Say! among others) and announcer (Date with the Angels, Lawrence Welk's Top Tunes and New Talent). Brother of Jack Narz.	
October 10	Kent L. Wakeford	92	American cinematographer	
October 12	Conchata Ferrell	77	Character actress (recurring roles on L.A. Law, Two and a Half Men, Hot l Baltimore, E/R, Hearts Afire, Teen Angel, and The Ranch)	
October 14	Rhonda Fleming	97	Actress (guest spots on Wagon Train, Police Woman, The Love Boat, and McMillan & Wife)	
October 15	Joan Barnett	74	American television producer (The Jayne Mansfield Story, The Parent Trap II, Long Gone)	
October 16	Anthony Chisholm	77	Actor best known as Burr Redding on Oz	
October 18	Sid Hartman	100	Sports journalist (panelist on Sports Show with Mike Max on WUCW/Minneapolis–St. Paul for 20 years)	
October 21	Marge Champion	101	American dancer, model, and actress (guest spots on The Philco Television Playhouse, Lux Video Theatre,The Red Skelton Show, Fame, and Queen of the Stardust Ballroom (which won her an Emmy Award in 1975)	
October 22	William Blinn	83	American screenwriter (most notably writer of Brian's Song, Roots and The Boys Next Door and creator of Starsky & Hutch) and producer (Fame). Emmy winner (1972, 1977).	
October 22	Joel Daly	86	American news anchor, most notably for 38 years (1967–2005) at WLS-TV/Chicago	
October 27	Don Morrow	93	American voice-over artist announcer (Sale of the Century, The Challengers) and host (Camouflage)	
October 28	Kathleen Luong	45	Vietnamese American actress and model	
October 28	Leanza Cornett	49	Model (Miss America 1993) and television personality (host of Entertainment Tonight, Who Wants to Marry a Multi-Millionaire?, and On The Block; guest spots on Melrose Place, The Tick, and Fear Factor)	

== November ==
Date	Name	Age	Notability	Source
November 1	Carol Arthur	85	American actress, mainly recognizable in supporting roles in films directed by Mel Brooks; widow of Dom DeLuise	
November 1	Eddie Hassell	30	American actor	
November 1	Nikki McKibbin	42	Singer who competed on the first season of American Idol.	
November 1	Elsa Raven	91	Actress (recurring roles on Days of Our Lives, Amen, and Wiseguy)	
November 6	Ken Spears	82	American animation producer and writer, co-founder and namesake of Ruby-Spears Productions, also contributed to Hanna-Barbera (most famously co-creating Scooby-Doo), Sid and Marty Krofft, and DePatie-Freleng Enterprises	
November 7	Norm Crosby	93	American comedian, host of The Comedy Shop from 1978 to 1981, also recurring guest on The Tonight Show Starring Johnny Carson.	
November 8	Alex Trebek	80	Canadian-American newsman and television personality best known as the long-time host of Jeopardy!; other notable American shows included Double Dare, To Tell the Truth, Classic Concentration, High Rollers and Battlestars. Guest cameos on several shows (in which their characters appear on Jeopardy!) including The Golden Girls, Mama's Family, and Cheers. Parodied by Will Ferrell on Saturday Night Live.	
November 9	Tom Heinsohn	86	Hall of Fame basketball player, coach, and broadcaster, all for the Boston Celtics (television color commentator for the Celtics since 1981)	
November 12	Lynn Kellogg	77	American actress and singer	
November 13	Walter C. Miller	94	American television producer and director	
November 14	Rae Norman	62	American actress	
November 14	William Thomas Jr.	73	American actor	
November 16	Art Wolff	82	American television director and acting coach (Pursuit of Happiness, The Tracey Ullman Show, It's Garry Shandling's Show, Grand, The Powers That Be, Rhythm & Blues)	
November 17	Kay Morley	100	American actress	
November 18	Mel Brez	84	American soap opera writer (The Doctors, One Life to Live, Days of Our Lives, As the World Turns)	
November 18	Kirby Morrow	47	Canadian actor, voice actor, writer, and comedian known for his roles as Miroku from InuYasha, Cyclops from X-Men: Evolution, Jay from Class of the Titans, and Cole from LEGO Ninjago: Masters of Spinjitzu.	
November 18	Marguerite Ray	89	Actress, best known for roles on Sanford, The Young and the Restless, and Dynasty	
November 19	Herb Solow	89	American television executive (Desilu Studios, MGM Television) and producer (Man From Atlantis)	
November 20	Dena Dietrich	91	American actress, best known for playing Mother Nature (and using the catchphrase "It's Not Nice To Fool Mother Nature!") in the Chiffon margarine commercials.	
November 20	Sandy Dvore	86	Graphic artist and title designer (created title sequences for The Partridge Family, The Young and the Restless, and several other television series and movies)	
November 20	Malcolm Marmorstein	92	American television writer	
November 23	Abby Dalton	88	Actress, best known as Ellie Barnes on The Joey Bishop Show and Julia Cumson on Falcon Crest	
November 24	Dorothea G. Petrie	95	American television producer	
November 29	Peg Murray	96	American actress of stage and television (The Doctors and the Nurses, Me & Mrs. C, Loving, All My Children)	

== December ==
Date	Name	Age	Notability	Source
December 2	Warren Berlinger	83	American character actor (The Joey Bishop Show, Bracken's World, The Funny Side, A Touch of Grace, Love, American Style, Operation Petticoat, Happy Days, CHiPs, Too Close for Comfort, Murder, She Wrote, Shades of LA)	
December 2	Rafer Johnson	86	American decathlete and actor	
December 2	Pat Patterson	79	WWE Hall of Fame professional wrestler	
December 4	David Lander	73	Comedian, actor and voice-over artist, significant roles include Andrew "Squiggy" Squiggman in Laverne & Shirley and Doc Boy Arbuckle in the Garfield franchise (other roles include Galaxy High School, Midnight Patrol: Adventures in the Dream Zone, ProStars, On the Air, Tattooed Teenage Alien Fighters from Beverly Hills, Pacific Blue, Jungle Cubs, 101 Dalmatians: The Series, Oswald)	
December 7	Natalie Desselle-Reid	53	Actress, significant roles include Minerva in Cinderella and Eunetta in For Your Love (other roles include Built to Last, Eve)	
December 10	Tom Lister Jr.	62	American actor and professional wrestler (under the ring names "Zeus" and "Z-Gangsta") with several bit roles in television	
December 10	Carol Sutton	76	American actress	
December 16	Marcus D'Amico	55	British actor best known as "Mouse" Tolliver in the 1993 miniseries Tales of the City	
December 17	Doug Crane	85	American animator (The Deputy Dawg Show, The Marvel Super Heroes shorts featuring Thor, Spider-Man, Challenge of the Superfriends, Godzilla, Trollkins, The Smurfs, He-Man and the Masters of the Universe, She-Ra: Princess of Power, BraveStarr)	
December 17	Tom Hanneman	68	Minneapolis–Saint Paul sportscaster (reporter/anchor for WCCO-TV, play-by-play voice of the Minnesota Timberwolves, studio host for Fox Sports North)	
December 17	Rod Perry	86	American actor best known for his role of Sgt. David "Deacon" Kay in S.W.A.T.	
December 18	Joseph L. Scanlan	91	American film and television director (The Starlost, Land of the Lost, Somerset, Matt and Jenny, The Littlest Hobo, The Campbells, Falcon Crest, Star Trek: The Next Generation, Knots Landing, The Young Riders, Homefront, The Outer Limits, La Femme Nikita)	
December 19	David Giler	77	American writer and producer (Tales from the Crypt, Tales from the Cryptkeeper and Perversions of Science)	
December 20	Lee Wallace	90	American actor of film, stage, and television	
December 23	Rebecca Luker	59	American actress, singer, and recording artist (Boardwalk Empire, Law & Order: Special Victims Unit, NCIS: New Orleans)	
December 26	Jonathan Huber	41	Professional wrestler known as Luke Harper in World Wrestling Entertainment and Brodie Lee in All Elite Wrestling	
December 27	William Link	87	Writer/producer, most notably for Columbo and Murder, She Wrote (The Alfred Hitchcock Hour, Michael Shayne, Jericho, Mannix, Ellery Queen, Blacke's Magic, Probe, B.L. Stryker, Over My Dead Body, The Cosby Mysteries)	
December 28	Nick McGlashan	33	American fisherman (Deadliest Catch)	
December 29	Jessica Campbell	38	Naturopathic practitioner and actress best known as Amy Andrews on Freaks and Geeks	
December 29	Adolfo Gutierrez Quiñones	65	American actor/dancer/choreographer, better known as Shabba Doo and founding member of The Original Lockers (credits include The Super Mario Bros. Super Show!, Married... with Children, Miami Vice, What's Happening!! (alongside fellow Locker Fred Berry), Saturday Night Live, Blowin' Up and Lawrence Leung's Choose Your Own Adventure; featured in the music videos for Chaka Khan's "I Feel for You" and Madonna's "Who's That Girl?"; also an alumnus member of the Soul Train Dancers)	
December 30	Dawn Wells	82	American actress, author, and producer, best known for portraying Mary Ann Summers on Gilligan's Island and its subsequent franchises; Marketing Ambassador to MeTV; Pageant winner of Miss Nevada 1959.	
December 31	Gary Howard Klar	73	American actor	
December 31	Joan Micklin Silver	85	American director	
