= Alison Morris =

American journalist and news anchor

- Born: Long Island, New York, U.S.
- Education: Yale University (BA)
- Occupations: Journalist, news anchor
- Years active: 2002–present
- Spouse: Scott Roslyn (m. 2013)

Alison Morris is an American journalist. She is a former news anchor at NBC News.

== Early life and education ==
Alison Morris was born and raised on Long Island, New York, where she attended Our Lady of Mercy Academy, an all-female private Catholic college preparatory school. She later graduated with a bachelor's degree in sociology from Yale University in 2001.

== Career ==
Morris began her career in 2002 when she worked for CNBC Europe and The Wall Street Journal Europe as a reporter in Paris, France. In 2005, Morris returned to the United States and became a reporter for KDKA-TV in Pittsburgh. In 2010, she moved to FoxCT (now known as WTIC-TV), where she became one of the channel's news anchors. In 2014, Morris switched to Fox 5 New York, working as the channel's business news anchor. In July 2019, Morris was then hired by NBC News, where she has been a news anchor for the network's streaming service NBC News Now. In January 2020, Morris additionally became a weekend anchor for MSNBC.

On her January 26, 2020 broadcast on MSNBC, Morris was reporting on the death of retired basketball player Kobe Bryant, who was one of nine people killed in a helicopter crash earlier in the day. When Morris referred to Bryant's former team of the Los Angeles Lakers, she claims to have verbally stumbled and said "Los Angeles Nakers", immediately self-correcting to "Los Angeles Lakers". This caused many people to accuse her of saying the racial slur "nigger" on air, which she denied. The controversy led to the starting of a petition to have her fired, which gained over 184,000 signatures. Morris said she had stuttered, combining the words "Knicks" and "Lakers" into "Nakers".

Morris left her role at NBC in May 2022, stating in social media posts that she planned to become a sommelier.

== Personal life ==
Alison Morris lives in Manhattan with her husband, Scott. Morris is fluent in French and regularly travels to Paris to visit friends she made while working in the French capital. She is also a fan of the New York Yankees.
