= Carleton H. Sheets =

American businessman (1939–2020)

Carleton Hunter Sheets (August 25, 1939 - January 25, 2020) was a real estate investor and author who was notable for television infomercials which marketed real estate business learning materials. Sheets appeared on numerous radio and television talk shows.

Sheets was born in Illinois and moved to Delaware, Ohio, where his father worked for Procter & Gamble. One of his early jobs was marketing soft-drink bottle caps and later became director of marketing for a Florida orange juice processor.

In 1984 Sheets teamed up with businessmen from Chicago, Mark S. Holecek and Donald R. Strumillo, to form their venture "Professional Education Institute." The privately held "Professional Education Institute" is incorporated as AMS Direct, Inc. It was founded in 1983 and is based in Burr Ridge, Illinois with coaching locations and operations in Salt Lake City, Utah. The Better Business Bureau has reported hundreds of complaints from customers of Mr. Sheets and P.E.I., many of them contending that they were overbilled and had difficulties securing refunds. A few state attorney general offices say they have received a handful of similar complaints over the years.

Sheets died January 25, 2020. He was survived by a wife, two children, a stepson and one grandchild.
