= Ken Barlow (disambiguation) =

Ken Barlow is a fictional character in Coronation Street.

Ken Barlow may also refer to:

- Ken Barlow (harness racing) (born 1936), American harness horse driver
- Ken Barlow (meteorologist) (born 1962), American meteorologist
- Ken Barlow (basketball) (born 1964), American basketball player
