= Glenn Burns =

American television meteorologist (born 1952)

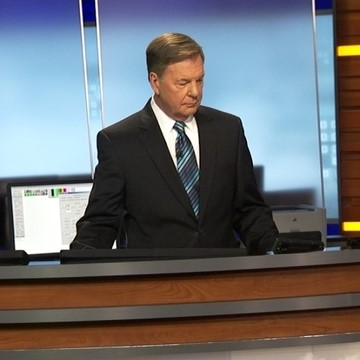
- Burns in Severe Weather Center 2 in 2016
- Born: July 21, 1952 (age 73)
- Education: University of Florida; University of Minnesota
- Occupation: Meteorologist
- Spouse: Susan Burns

Glenn N. Burns (born July 21, 1952) is an American meteorologist, who was the chief meteorologist at WSB-TV in Atlanta, Georgia, a position he held for just over 40 years. In October, 2022, Glenn announced his retirement. Glenn's last day was November 22, 2022. He is an AMS certified meteorologist and appeared on the 4 and 6 p.m. newscasts Monday-Friday. He also hosted the weekly Mega Millions lottery drawings, based in Atlanta.

== Biography ==
At age 14, Burns began working for WSVN-TV in Miami, Florida. He received a journalism degree from the University of Florida. After this, he interned at the National Hurricane Center working for Drs. Neil Frank and Joseph Pellisier. He then became chief meteorologist at WPTV-TV in West Palm Beach, Florida. He has received numerous awards for his work in meteorology from the American Red Cross, United States Coast Guard and Civil defense, Best of Cobb Magazine, Best of Atlanta Magazine, the Associated Press, and Best of Gwinnett Magazine. After working for three years in Florida, he went to the University of Minnesota to begin his postgraduate work in astrophysics. At the time, he was chief meteorologist for WTCN-TV in Minneapolis, Minnesota. During that time, he received numerous awards, including a Minnesota Teacher's Award for his work in weather education. He joined WSB-TV’s Severe Weather Team in 1982.

On 10/27/2022, Glenn Burns announced that he would be retiring after 40 years at WSB-TV, His final day was 11/22/2022.

== Personal life ==
Burns lives with his wife, Susan, in Marietta. They work for many area charities including the March of Dimes, Boys and Girls Clubs of Metro Atlanta, The Center for Family Resources, and the Starlight Foundation. His hobbies include fishing, hiking, and astronomy. Glenn and Susan have two children, Kimberly and Chris.
