= Foshay Tower =

Skyscraper in Minneapolis, Minnesota

- U.S. National Register of Historic Places
- Minneapolis Landmark
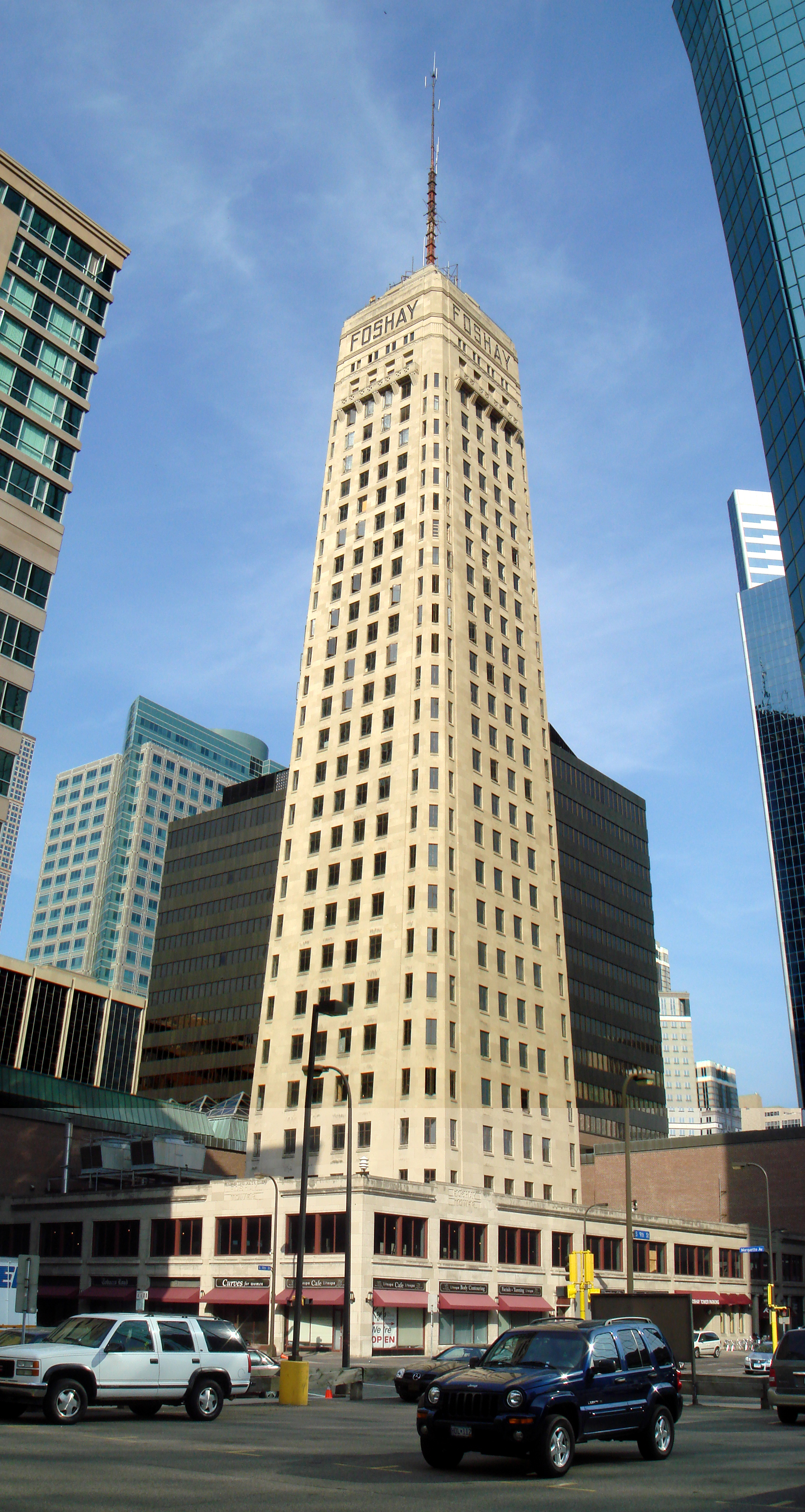
- The Foshay Tower, looking east.
- Location: Minneapolis, Minnesota
- Coordinates: 44°58′28″N 93°16′17.5″W
- Built: August 30, 1929; 97 years ago
- Architect: Léon Eugène Arnal, Magney & Tusler, Inc.
- Architectural style: Art Deco
- NRHP reference No.: 78001538

Significant dates
- Added to NRHP: September 20, 1978
- Designated MPLSL: 1984

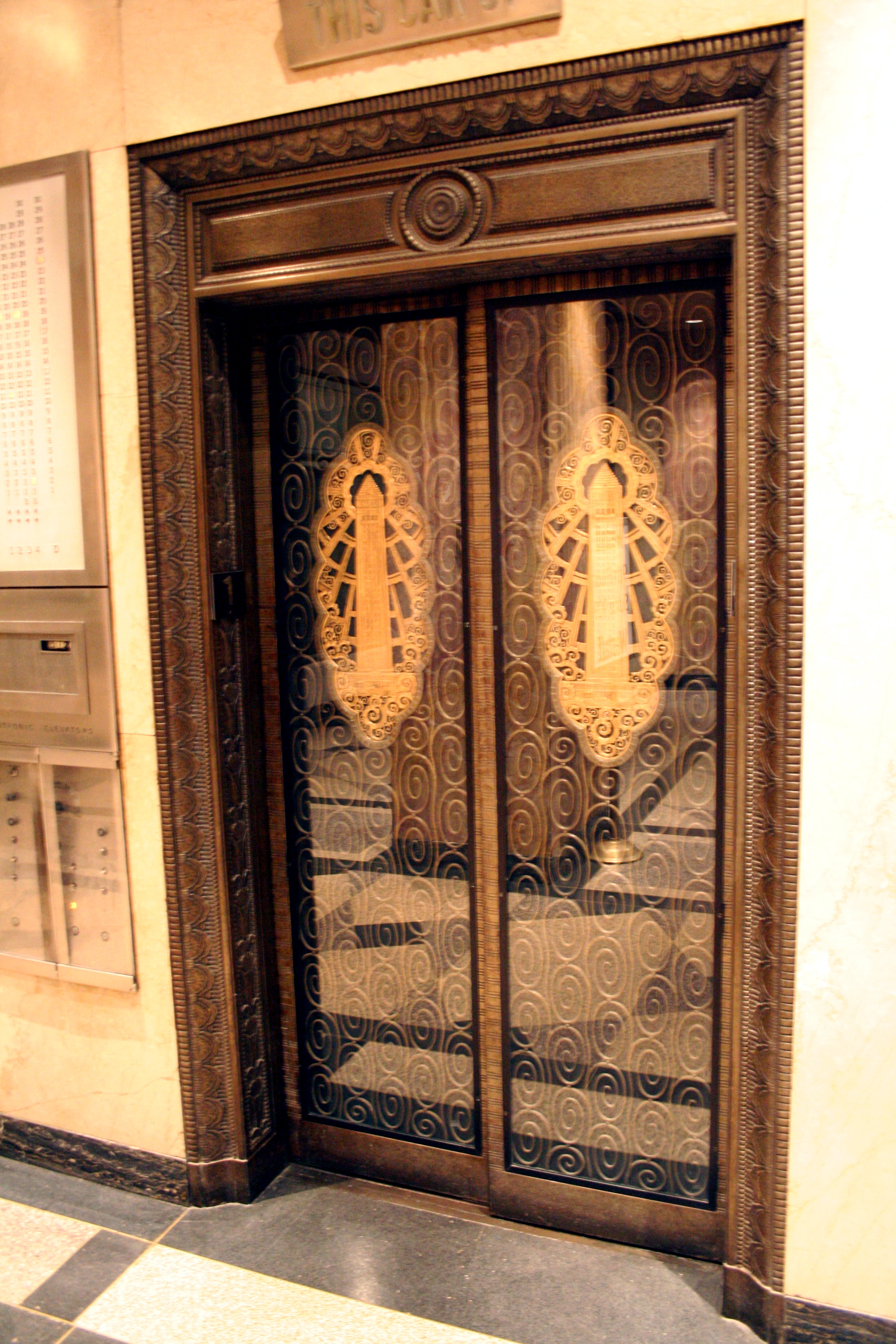
Elevator doors

The Foshay Tower, now the W Minneapolis – The Foshay hotel, is an Art Deco skyscraper in Minneapolis, Minnesota. Modeled after the Washington Monument, the building was completed in 1929. It has 32 floors and stands 447 feet (136 m) high, which made it the tallest building in Minneapolis until 1972 when the IDS Center was completed. The antenna mast extends the total height of the structure to 607 feet (185 m). The building was added to the National Register of Historic Places in 1978. Its address is 821 Marquette Avenue, although it is set well back from the street and is actually closer to 9th Street than Marquette.

== Early skyscraper ==
The Foshay Tower marked a significant landmark locally in the push skyward, as the tower was the first in the city to surpass the height of Minneapolis City Hall, completed in 1906. It remained one of the tallest buildings in the Midwest for 48 years and was the tallest building in Minneapolis until the IDS Center surpassed it in 1972.

Elevators served the 32-floor tower and the observation deck. The elevators were converted to automatic in 1957. The fee to ride the elevator was 50 cents from its opening in 1929 until the late 1960s. The current fee is $18.

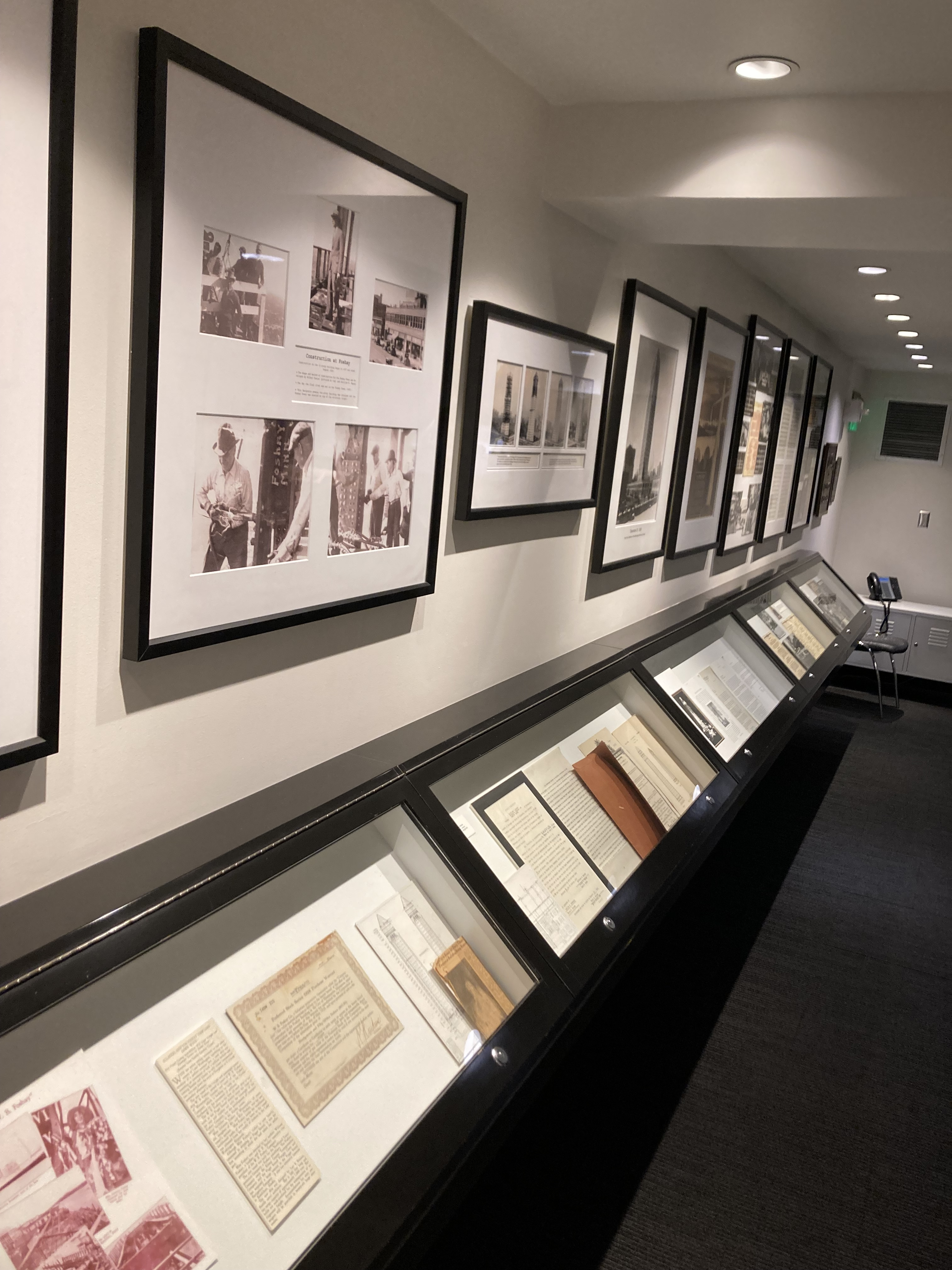
Foshay Tower Museum Below the Observation Platform

== Structure and interior ==
As the building was designed to echo the Washington Monument, the sides of the building slope slightly inward, and each floor of the Foshay Tower is slightly smaller than the one below it. It is also unusual in that the tower is set back from the street, with a two-story structure surrounding it on the Marquette Avenue and 9th Street sides. The other two sides of the building, facing 8th Street and 2nd Avenue, are now surrounded by 121 South Eighth, which rises to 17 stories on the 2nd Avenue side and entirely obscures the views from the windows of the first seven stories of the Foshay Tower on the 2nd Avenue and 8th Street sides. Internally the building uses steel and reinforced concrete. The exterior is faced with Indiana limestone, while the interior features African mahogany, Italian marble, terrazzo, gold-plated doorknobs, a silver and gold plated ceiling, ornamental bronze entrances and work throughout the building (made by Crown Iron Works Company of Minneapolis), hand wrought iron and three commissioned busts of George Washington. It cost US$3.75 million to build. From the Marquette Avenue side of the structure, the name, "Foshay," is visible in concrete four times on the exterior of the building (once on the top and three times on the street level).

== Dedication ==
Foshay Tower was the lifelong dream and namesake of Wilbur Foshay, an art student turned businessman who amassed his fortune by building up three utility company empires (operating as the W. B. Foshay Company). Foshay had built it as homage to the Washington Monument. At the time the tower was being built, he had sold his previous two empires in turn and was building up his third (which was eventually to stretch from Alaska to Nicaragua). He planned to locate his business and residence on the 27th and 28th floors where a three-bedroom, three-bath suite was built, with a fireplace and library, Italian Siena marble walls and glass-paneled ceilings.

Foshay invited 25,000 guests to the dedication ceremony and provided all-expenses paid trips to many including cabinet members, senators, and congressmen. Half-nude dancers entertained. Each guest received a gold pocket watch. The military gave 19-gun salutes. John Philip Sousa conducted music, including the "Foshay Tower–Washington Memorial March," a march he wrote for the occasion. Foshay presented Sousa with a check for US$20,000.

The march was only played once during Foshay's lifetime. Six weeks after the building's opening on November 2, 1929, Foshay's corporate empire was thrown into receivership at the onset of the Great Depression. Ignominiously, Foshay's check to Sousa bounced, and in retaliation, Sousa prohibited the playing of the march so long as Foshay's debt to him remained outstanding. Foshay never lived in his new home, which also went into receivership. It wasn't until 1988 when a group of Minnesota investors repaid Foshay's debt to Sousa's estate that the march was permitted to be played in public again.

== Magney & Tusler ==
The Foshay was designed by Léon Eugène Arnal (1881–1963), chief designer for the architects Magney & Tusler, later known as Setter, Leach & Lindstrom, which was acquired by Leo A. Daly in 2003.

The building has the name "FOSHAY" in 10 foot (3 m) lighted letters on all four sides just below the top. A U.S. patent for this display technique was filed in 1929 by Gottlieb R. Magney, Wilbur Tusler and Arnal and granted in 1931, assigned to the W. B. Foshay Co.

== Later use ==
The tower was headquarters for Citizens Utilities, the successor to Foshay's company.

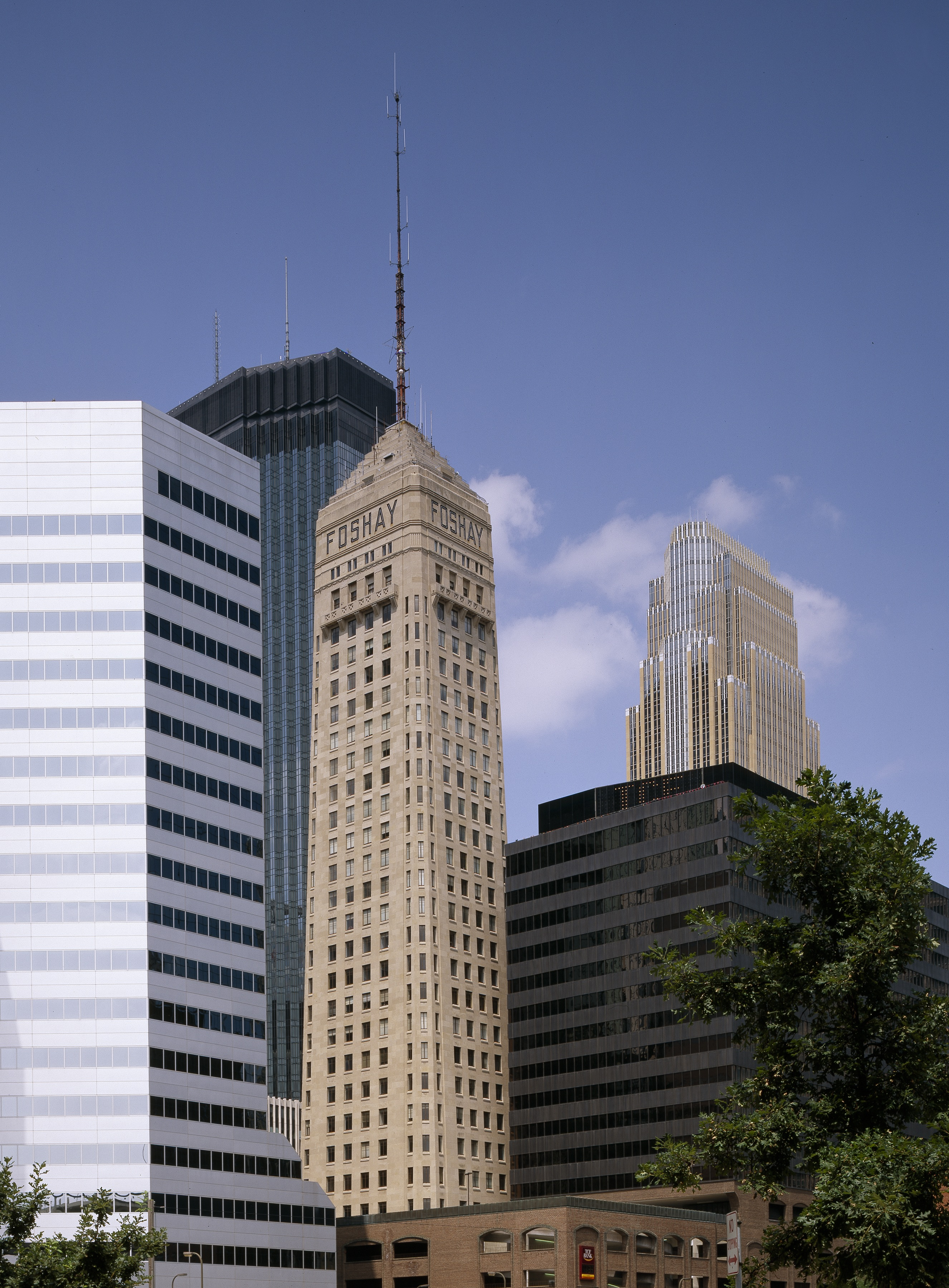
Foshay Tower and surrounding buildings, with the IDS Center, the current tallest building, in the background

In January 1981, the building was wrapped in a huge yellow ribbon during the final days of the Iran hostage crisis. Once the hostages returned to the United States, the ribbon was moved to the Minnesota State Capitol in Saint Paul so that people could sign it. The ribbon is now in the Minnesota Historical Society.

The antenna on the roof has been used by various broadcasters, including television stations WTCN (now KARE), WCCO and KMSP. Radio station KFAI has been broadcasting from the tower since 1984, but moved their transmission tower to the IDS Center in March 2007, due to the W Hotel renovation. Around 1980, when the Foshay was still one of the tallest buildings in Minneapolis, the pyramidal top was covered with numerous pieces of radio transmitting equipment.

The structure's street level establishments once included Cafe Un Deux Trois, notable for having Andrew Zimmern as Executive Chef for its first 4 1/2-years, and Peter's Grill, Minneapolis's oldest restaurant, was located across the street.

The Norwegian consulate was located in the tower until 2007, when it moved to the AT&T Tower across the street.

== Conversion to W Hotel ==
On September 4, 2006, it was reported that developers Ralph W. Burnet and Minneapolis-based Ryan Companies would spend as much as $90 million to convert the 32-story office tower into a 230-room W Hotel. All tenants with the exception of Keys Café on the first floor moved out.

A unique finding occurred at the tower when workers were replacing the ceiling in the hotel's lobby. When the lobby ceiling was removed, they discovered the room's original ceiling, complete with intricate engravings and embossed with various logos. However, due to past renovation work and age, the ceiling had deteriorated and was badly damaged. The original ceiling was restored at the behest of the National Register of Historic Places.

The renovated W Minneapolis – The Foshay opened on August 13, 2008. The hotel retains the 30th floor observation deck and converted Wilbur Foshay's former boardroom on the 27th floor into the Prohibition Sky Bar.

== See also ==
- List of tallest buildings in Minnesota
- List of tallest buildings in Minneapolis

Preceded by Plummer Building	Tallest building in Minnesota; 1929—1973; 447 feet (136 m)	Succeeded by IDS Tower
