= Michigan Lottery =

Lottery run by the state of Michigan

Agency overview
- Jurisdiction: Michigan
- Headquarters: 101 E Hillsdale St, Lansing, Michigan 48933
- Agency executive: Director

The Michigan Lottery was initiated under the authority of Public Act 239 in 1972, and collects funds to support Michigan's public school system.

== History ==
The Michigan Lottery began when the Green Ticket game started on November 13, 1972. Hermus Millsaps of Taylor, Michigan won the first $1 million prize on February 22, 1973. When he won, Mr. Millsaps was 53 years old, a native of Tennessee and worked at a Chrysler Automobile plant. He and his wife spent all their money on bus fare to Lansing and the first Michigan Lottery Commissioner, Gus Harrison, had a lottery agent drive the couple home. On October 7, 1975, the first instant game ticket was purchased. Terminal-based games commenced on June 6, 1977, when the Daily 3 game was introduced. The first "Michigan Lotto" game was introduced on August 13, 1984. The first The Big Game (now Mega Millions) ticket was sold on August 31, 1996. Since its commencement, the Michigan Lottery has donated more than $27 billion to the School Aid Fund.

== Lottery Products ==
The Michigan Lottery offers a number of games in different styles of play, including:

- "Scratch-off" games;
- Terminal-based games, where drawings are held to pick winning numbers. These include Mega Millions, Lotto 47 and Powerball;
- Pull-tabs, which are similar to scratch tickets; however, players pull perforated tabs instead of "scratching off" the ticket;
- Online versions of scratch-off games, as well as digital tickets for terminal-based games, available for purchase through the internet.

Lottery tickets are offered to the public through more than 10,000 licensed Michigan Lottery retailers, as well as online at the Michigan Lottery's website.

=== Scratch games ===
To play Michigan Lottery scratch games, a player scratches off a ticket; each game consists of different themes, play styles and prize structures. The Lottery averages over 70 new scratch games per year. These games are priced from $1 to $50, with prizes up to $6 million.

=== Terminal-based games ===
Tickets for these games are sold from lottery terminals connected to a central system. Lottery drawings are held to determine the winning numbers. Depending on the lottery game, drawings are held four minutes apart (Club Keno), twice a day (Daily 3, Daily 4 and Daily 5), daily (Fantasy 5 with Double Play, Poker Lotto and Keno!) or twice a week (Powerball, Mega Millions, and Lotto 47 with Double Play).

== Current draw games ==
=== In-house draw games ===
==== Daily 3, Daily 4, and Daily 5 ====
Players select either a three-digit, four-digit, or five-digit number; to win, the player's number must match exactly the number drawn. The prize is $500, $5,000, or $50,000 for Daily 3, Daily 4, and Daily 5 respectively. Optional methods of play allow players to improve their odds in exchange for a lower payout.

==== Fantasy 5 + ezMatch ====
Fantasy 5 began on September 12, 2004, replacing a game called Rolldown. Players select 5 numbers from 1 to 39. Jackpots begin at $100,000 with drawings held daily. Fantasy 5 jackpots increase by a minimum of $5,000 per drawing if there is no jackpot winner. The odds of winning the jackpot are 1 in 575,757. Players also win for matching 4($100), 3($10) or 2($1) numbers. Fantasy 5 results are shown on the nightly version of the Michigan Lottery Show. "ezMatch" is a separate game that can be purchased and played separately from the nightly draw. The game functions as a terminal-based instant game, offering prizes ranging from $2 to $500.

==== Lotto 47 + ezMatch ====
Introduced on May 15, 2005, Lotto 47 replaced Winfall. Players pick 6 numbers from 1 to 47(hence the name). Lotto 47 drawings are held twice weekly with jackpots starting at $1 million. The odds of winning the jackpot are approximately 1 in 11 million. Players also win for matching 5($2,500), 4($100) or 3($5) numbers. As with Fantasy 5, "ezMatch" is an add-on game to Lotto 47. Prizes offered are identical to those of Fantasy 5's EZ match.

===== Double Play =====
In January 2019, Michigan Lottery introduced an add-on feature for Fantasy 5 & Lotto 47 games. For only an extra $1, players have another chance to match their numbers in a second drawing. The odds for winning the top prizes are the same.

Fantasy 5 match	DP prize	Fantasy 5 odds	Lotto 47 match	DP prize	Lotto 47 odds
5 of 5	$110,000	1 : 575,757	6 of 6	$1,500,000	1 : 10,737,573
4 of 5	$200	1 : 3,387	5 of 6	$5,000	1 : 43,649
3 of 5	$20	1 : 103	4 of 6	$200	1 : 873
2 of 5	$2	1 : 10	3 of 6	$10	1 : 50

==== Poker Lotto ====
Poker Lotto is drawn daily and also has an instant win feature. Each Poker Lotto play costs $2 and only one play will be printed on a ticket. Each ticket is a quick pick play with five card symbols, no card knowledge or skill is needed to play. Players can win instantly at the time of purchase if the card symbols on their ticket match a specified winning hand from the prize structure. The top prize for an instant win is $5,000. The top prize for the nightly drawing is $100,000. At the nightly drawings, players also win by matching 4($500), 3($25) or 2($3) cards.

Unlike Daily 3, Daily 4, and Daily 5 (which draw numbered balls), Keno!, Lotto 47, Fantasy 5, and Poker Lotto are drawn using a random number generator (RNG).

=== In-house Club Games ===
Added in 2003, Club Games consist of the Club Keno game and pull-tabs, available mostly in social settings, such as bars, restaurants, and bowling centers.

==== Club Keno ====
For Club Keno players choose up to 10 numbers out of 80. With results displayed on television sets three and a half minutes apart, the Lottery draws 20 numbers. Wagers are $1 to $20; the top prize is $100,000 for a $1 bet. In 2010, Club Keno was made available to all retailers across the state.

==== Pull-tabs ====
With top prizes ranging from $1,000 to $30,000, pull-tab games are similar to "scratch-off" games. Instead of scratching off a ticket, a player pulls perforated tabs.

==== Keno! ====
Initiated in 1990, Keno! players select 10 numbers out of 80. During the daily drawings, 22 numbers are chosen. A player matching 10 numbers wins $250,000. Players also win money by matching 9, 8, 7, or 6 numbers. There also is a prize for matching zero numbers, which is a $1 scratch ticket (rather than a free Keno! play). Keno! results are available online shortly after each drawing

=== Multi-jurisdictional games ===
==== Lucky for Life ====
Lucky for Life is a lottery drawing game available in 23 states and the District Of Columbia. Players select 5 numbers from 1–48 and a sixth number from 1–18. Prizes range from $1 to $1,000 per day, every day, for the winner's life.

==== Mega Millions ====
On September 6, 1996, six lotteries (including Michigan's) began The Big Game. It became Mega Millions six years later. Players select six numbers from two number pools: 5 numbers from 1 through 70, and the Mega Ball number (1 through 25) for a chance to win a multimillion-dollar jackpot. Currently, Mega Millions jackpots begin at $20 million (annuity value), and increases when there is no top prize winner. Drawings are held on Tuesdays and Fridays. Jackpot winners in Michigan, as with most Mega Millions jurisdictions, choose either the annuity (30 annual payments) or the cash option after winning. The Megaplier option, which multiplies a non-jackpot prize by 2, 3, 4, or 5, became available in Michigan in January 2011.

==== Powerball ====
Powerball began in 1992 and Michigan joined in 2010. Players select six numbers from two pools as in Mega Millions: five numbers from 1 through 69, and one red Powerball number from 1 through 26. Jackpots begin at $20 million annuity. Drawings are Mondays, Wednesdays, and Saturdays. For only an extra $1, players have another chance in a second Double Play drawing, like Fantasy 5 and Lotto 47.

== Online Gaming ==
In August 2014, the Michigan Lottery re-launched its website, giving players the opportunity to buy tickets for some draw games and a host of "virtual" scratch-off games over the internet. Over time, the selection of games has evolved to include nearly all draw-based terminal games (the well-known exceptions are Daily 3 & Daily 4), several different versions of instant Keno games, and many different virtual scratch-off games. Prizes for online games range vary depending on the cost of the ticket purchased, but can be as high as $500,000. In order to purchase these online games, a player must be a Michigan resident, as well as physically present in the state when playing. Depositing funds can be accomplished easily through various options. Withdrawing funds requires an additional submission of a valid, color copy, driver's license and a copy of a voided check.
