= Bernie Grace =

Bernie Grace is a television news reporter, most notably with KARE 11 in Minnesota. Early in his career, he was a news director at radio stations in Virginia and Rhode Island. He then worked at television stations in Orlando, Florida, and Richmond, Virginia. In February 1979 he joined the KARE 11 News Team as a general assignment reporter.

Mr. Grace has received awards from the Associated Press, Northwest Broadcast News Association, the Academy of Television of Arts and Sciences (Emmys) and the New York Film Festival. He retired from KARE 11 on July 14, 2006.
