= Calhoun Beach Club =

- The Beach Club Residences
- U.S. National Register of Historic Places
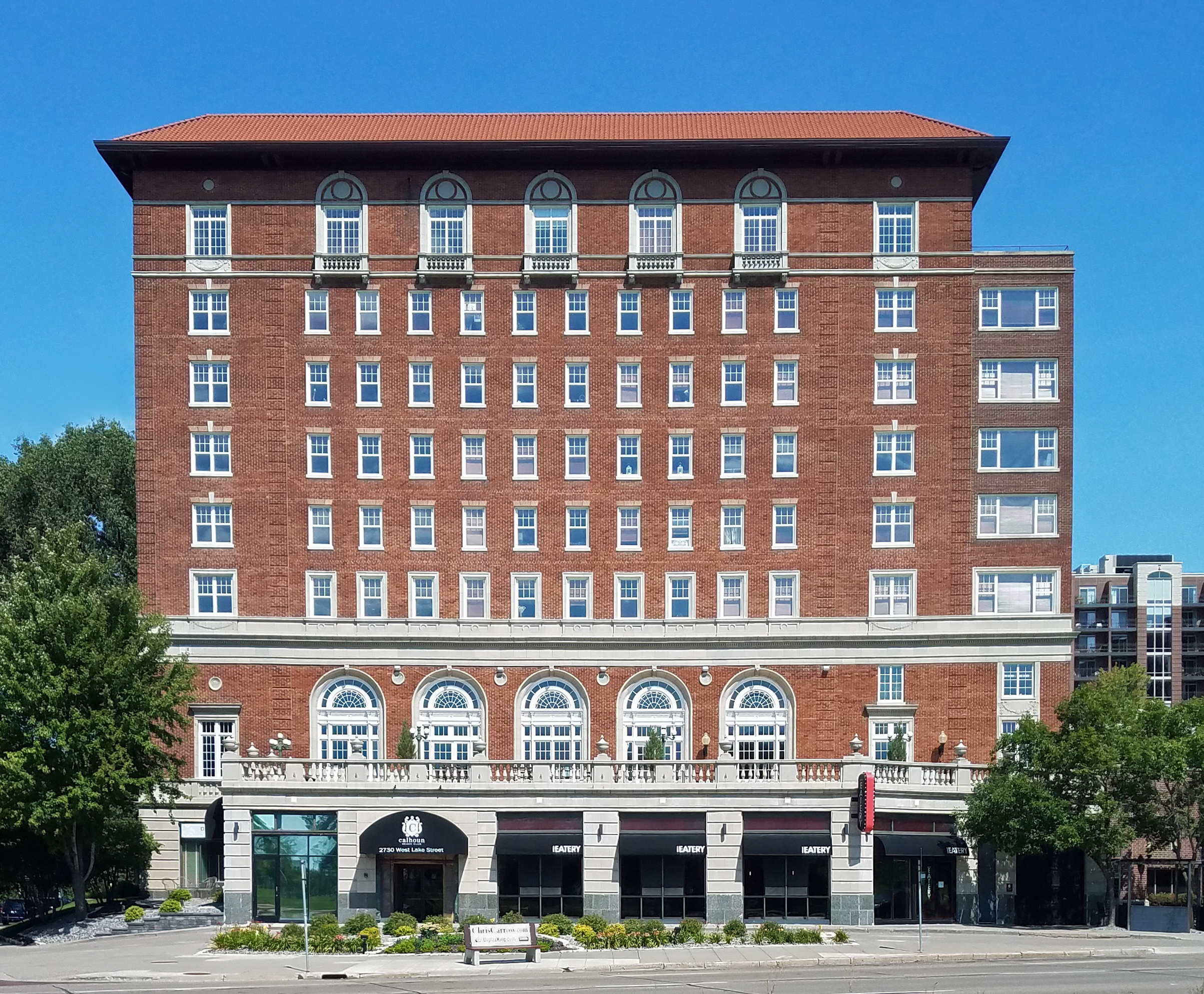
- The Beach Club viewed from the south

- Location within Minnesota Location within the United States
- Location: 2730 West Lake Street, Minneapolis, Minnesota
- Coordinates: 44°56′59″N 93°18′54″W
- Area: 2.128 acres (0.861 ha)
- Built: 1928–9, 1946
- Architect: Nicol, Charles Wheeler; Magney & Tusler
- Architectural style: Colonial Revival
- NRHP reference No.: 03001335
- Added to NRHP: December 23, 2003

The Beach Club Residences (formerly, Calhoun Beach Club) is an apartment community, health club, and commercial center in Minneapolis, Minnesota, United States, just across Lake Street from its namesake Lake Calhoun (now called Bde Maka Ska). Its founders intended the club to meet their residential, recreational, and entertainment needs in one building. The original building was listed on the National Register of Historic Places on December 23, 2003. It is considered significant as a rare local example of an apartment hotel, a distinctive urban housing option of American cities in the 1920s.

== History ==
Construction of the building began in 1928, but it was delayed for approximately 18 years due to the Great Depression. After World War II construction was completed, and it became a lively social club. Financial hard times in the early 1950s forced the club into bankruptcy. The building was converted to a hotel in 1954 and was marketed as a place for social events such as proms, parties, luncheons, banquets, and wedding receptions. The upper floors were converted into fashionable apartments. WTCN (now KARE television and WWTC radio) moved its radio and TV studios to the second and third floors around that time. Staples of WTCN programming, such as the children's program Lunch with Casey with Roger Awsumb, Matinee Movie with Mel Jass and All Star Wrestling with Verne Gagne, aired live in the building. From 1963 to 1972, the property was renamed Calhoun Beach Manor, operating as a home for the elderly.

In 1977 the building was restored to its intended use as a sports and social club. The handball and squash courts and the swimming pool were restored, and the club installed tennis courts, steam rooms, saunas, sunrooms, and a jogging track. At that time, the lobby was restored in an Art Deco style. Later, in the 1980s, the club added more facilities, such as an aerobics studio, volleyball and basketball courts, and additional exercise equipment.

In 1997 a tower addition designed by KKE architects was constructed.

In 2001 the property was renovated and converted to luxury apartments.

The original building – the oldest high-rise residential building outside of downtown Minneapolis' core – was listed on the National Register of Historic Places on December 23, 2003.

In 2020, the owner and operator of the luxury apartment community updated the building's name to The Beach Club Residences

== The Beach Club Residences ==
The Beach Club Residences community is located in the Uptown-Lakes area, overlooking Bde Maka Ska, Lake of the Isles, Cedar Lake and downtown Minneapolis, MN. The community consists of 332 apartment homes, divided among 57 different floorplans. Apartment homes vary from studios up to 4-bedrooms, which range from 600 sq ft (56 m^{2}) to 3,400 sq ft (320 m^{2}). The property is currently owned and operated by RPM Living.

== Calhoun Beach Club Commercial Tenants ==
The Beach Club includes 11 retails spaces, seven of which are currently occupied by the Chilango restaurant, Sash Salon, Strauman Holistic Chiropractic, Uptime Nutrition, D'Amico Catering and Sales, Beck and Tysver, and the Beach Health Club.

The 40,000 sq ft (3,700 m^{2}) Beach Health Club features high-tech fitness equipment, a full range of exercise and fitness classes including Pilates, ballroom dancing, strength-building, yoga and a running club. In addition, The Beach Club has indoor and outdoor pools, restaurants, a full-service salon, fitness classes, outdoor recreational equipment, and a tanning salon.

== Gallery ==
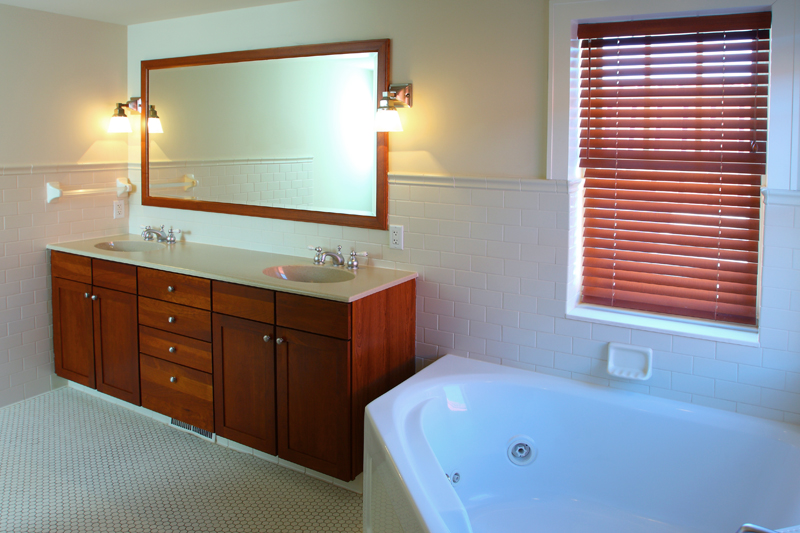
An apartment's bathroom in the historic Beach Club Residences apartment community

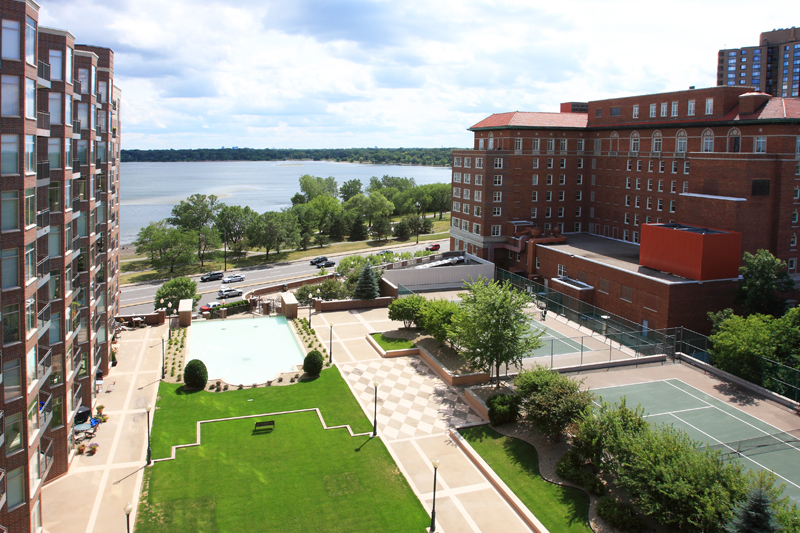
The apartment community's courtyard

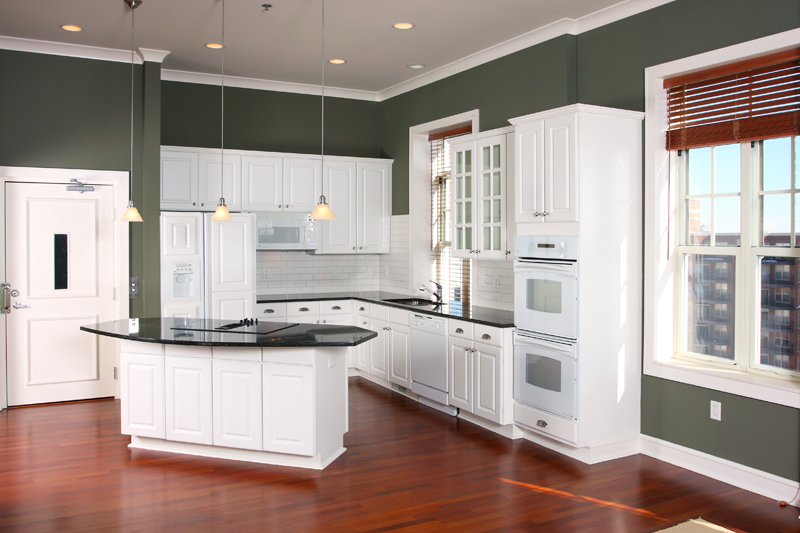
An apartment's kitchen in the apartment community.

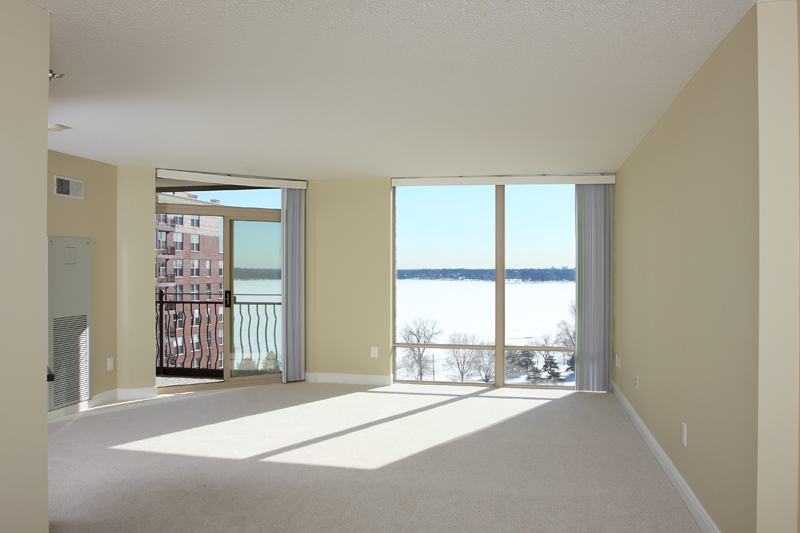
An apartment's living room in the apartment community

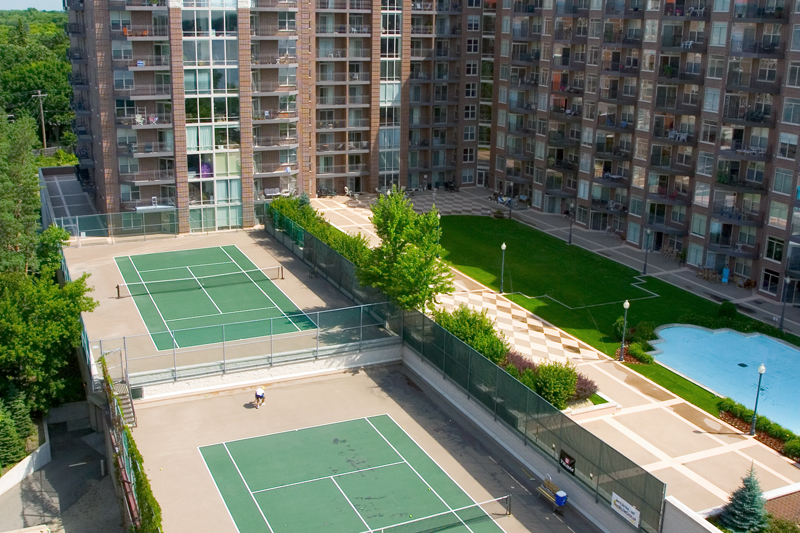
Tennis courts on the property.

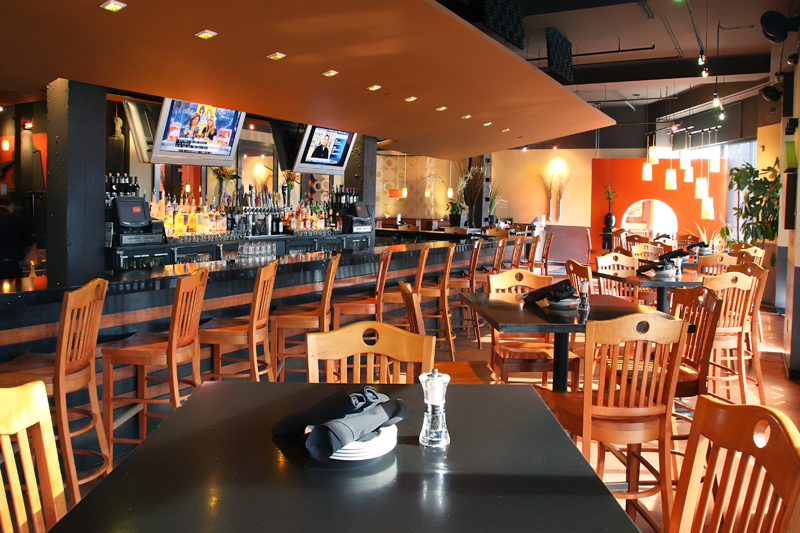
The View restaurant and bar.
