= KARE (TV) =

Television station in Minneapolis

- Minneapolis–Saint Paul, Minnesota; United States
- City: Minneapolis, Minnesota
- Channels: Digital: 31 (UHF); Virtual: 11
- Branding: KARE 11 (pronounced "care")

Programming
- Affiliations: 11.1: NBC; for others, see § Subchannels

Ownership
- Owner: Tegna Inc., a subsidiary of Nexstar Media Group; (Multimedia Holdings Corporation)

History
- First air date: September 1, 1953
- Former call signs: WTCN-TV (1953–1985); WMIN-TV (shared operation, 1953–1955); WUSA (1985–1986)
- Former channel numbers: Analog: 11 (VHF, 1953–2009); Digital: 35 (UHF, 1999–2009), 11 (VHF, 2009–2021)
- Former affiliations: ABC (1953–1961); Independent (1961–1979); DuMont (secondary, 1953–1956)
- Call sign meaning: Sounds like "care"

Technical information
- Licensing authority: FCC
- Facility ID: 23079
- ERP: 1,000 kW
- HAAT: 455.9 m (1,496 ft)
- Transmitter coordinates: 45°3′45″N 93°8′22″W
- Translator(s): see § Translators

Links
- Public license information: Public file; LMS
- Website: www.kare11.com

KARE (channel 11) is a television station licensed to Minneapolis, Minnesota, United States, serving as the NBC affiliate for the Twin Cities area. Owned by the Tegna subsidiary of Nexstar Media Group, the station maintains studios on Olson Memorial Highway (MN 55) in Golden Valley and a transmitter at the Telefarm Towers in Shoreview, Minnesota.

Channel 11 began broadcasting on September 1, 1953. It was originally shared by WMIN-TV in St. Paul and WTCN-TV in Minneapolis; the two stations shared an affiliation with ABC and alternated presenting local programs. In 1955, Consolidated Television and Radio bought both stations and merged them as WTCN-TV from the Minneapolis studios in the Calhoun Beach Hotel. The station presented several regionally and nationally notable children's shows in its early years as well as local cooking, news, and sports programs. Time Inc. purchased the station in 1957. Under its ownership, ABC switched its affiliation to KMSP-TV (channel 9), leaving channel 11 to become an independent station that broadcast games of the Minnesota Twins baseball team, movies, and syndicated programs. This continued under two successive owners: Chris-Craft Industries and Metromedia. By the late 1970s, WTCN was one of the nation's most financially successful independent stations.

In 1978, NBC's Twin Cities affiliate, KSTP-TV, announced it would switch its affiliation to ABC. This forced NBC to select between KMSP and WTCN for its new local outlet. It chose WTCN on the strength of its facilities, ownership, and promise to build a first-class news operation, for which KMSP had never been known as an ABC station. On March 5, 1979, channel 11 became an NBC affiliate and began airing newscasts under the branding NewsCenter 11. In spite of a major promotional campaign, the news product was a high-profile commercial failure, beaten by entertainment shows on KMSP in the ratings, as viewers rejected the new news team and continued to prefer market leaders WCCO-TV and KSTP-TV.

Metromedia agreed to buy Chicago independent station WFLD in 1982 and sold WTCN to Gannett to raise capital and make room in its station group. Gannett engineered a comprehensive overhaul of the station's news programming. Between 1983 and 1987, the station moved from last to first in late news ratings, battling WCCO for two decades. It changed call signs twice in that period, to WUSA in 1985 and KARE in 1986, when Gannett moved the WUSA call sign to its Washington, D.C., station. More recently, as of 2022, the station has been a second-place finisher in local news.

== History ==
=== Early years ===
==== WMIN-TV and WTCN-TV: The shared-time era ====
The WMIN Broadcasting Company of St. Paul applied in February 1948 for a new station licensed to that city on channel 2. The application was frozen when the Federal Communications Commission (FCC) halted all grants of new TV stations in 1948.

In February 1952—two months before the FCC lifted the freeze—the Minnesota Television Public Service Corporation, a company headed by former ambassador Robert Butler and headquartered in St. Paul, filed for channel 11 in Minneapolis. Weeks later, Mid Continent Radio Television, which owned station WTCN-TV on channel 4 as well as WTCN (1280 AM), announced it would take over WCCO radio, combine its operations with channel 4, and divest WTCN radio. Minnesota Television Public Service then acquired WTCN radio, which had to be sold to allow Mid Continent to purchase WCCO. The transactions were approved in August 1952, at which time channel 4 changed from WTCN-TV to WCCO-TV.

After the freeze was lifted, WMIN refiled its pre-freeze application in July to specify channel 11, as channel 2 had been set aside for educational broadcasting by the FCC. Later that month, Meredith Publishing filed for channel 11 in Minneapolis alongside stations in Rochester, New York, and St. Louis. Meredith owned three stations and had three pending station applications when the FCC ruled that companies could only have as many applications as additional stations it could own—the limit being five—in February 1953. With six stations and applications for stations, the company was one over the limit; it then dropped out of the channel 11 fight. WMIN and WTCN—each seeking to avoid a lengthy comparative hearing—proposed to share time on channel 11, which the FCC accepted in April 1953.

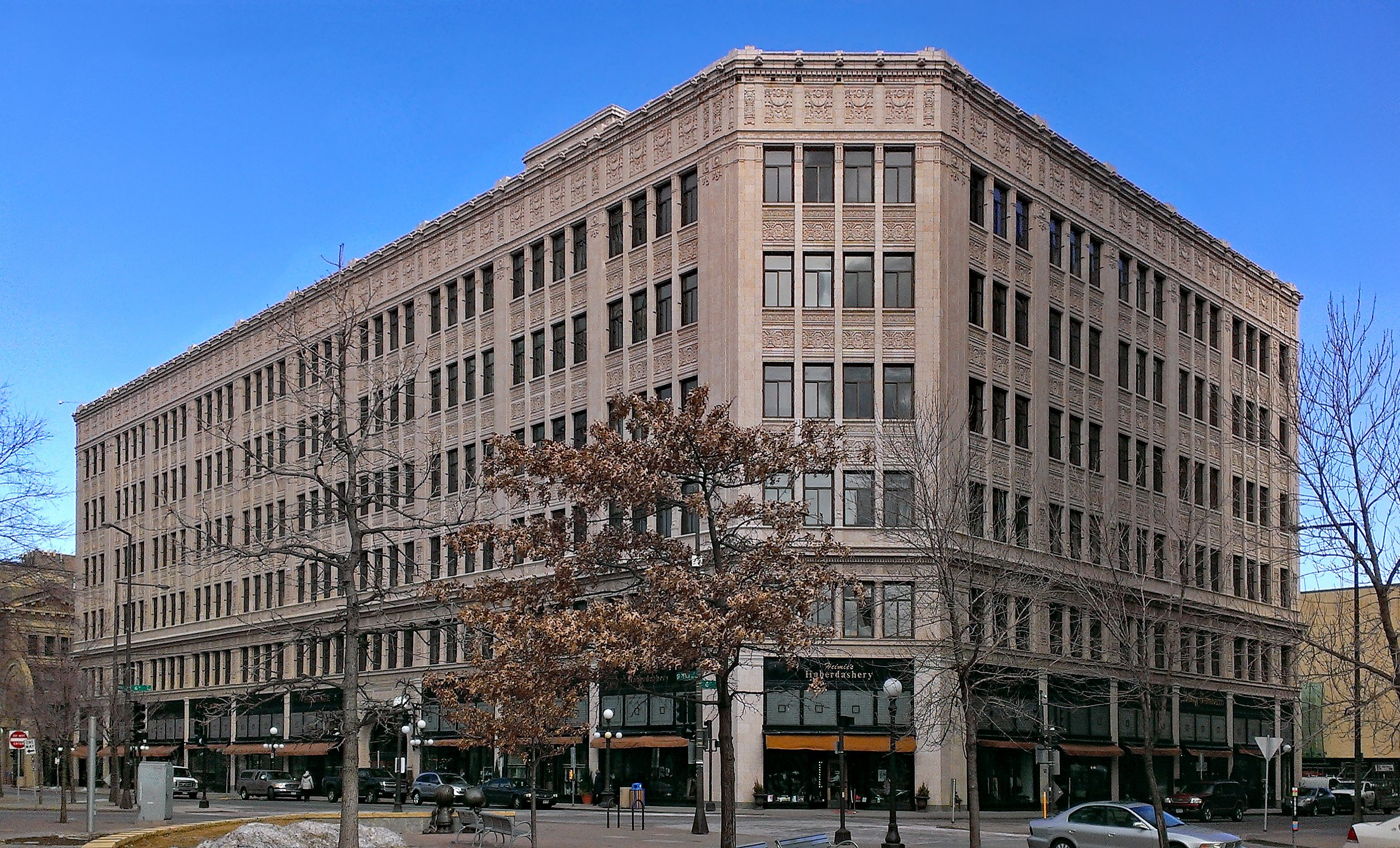
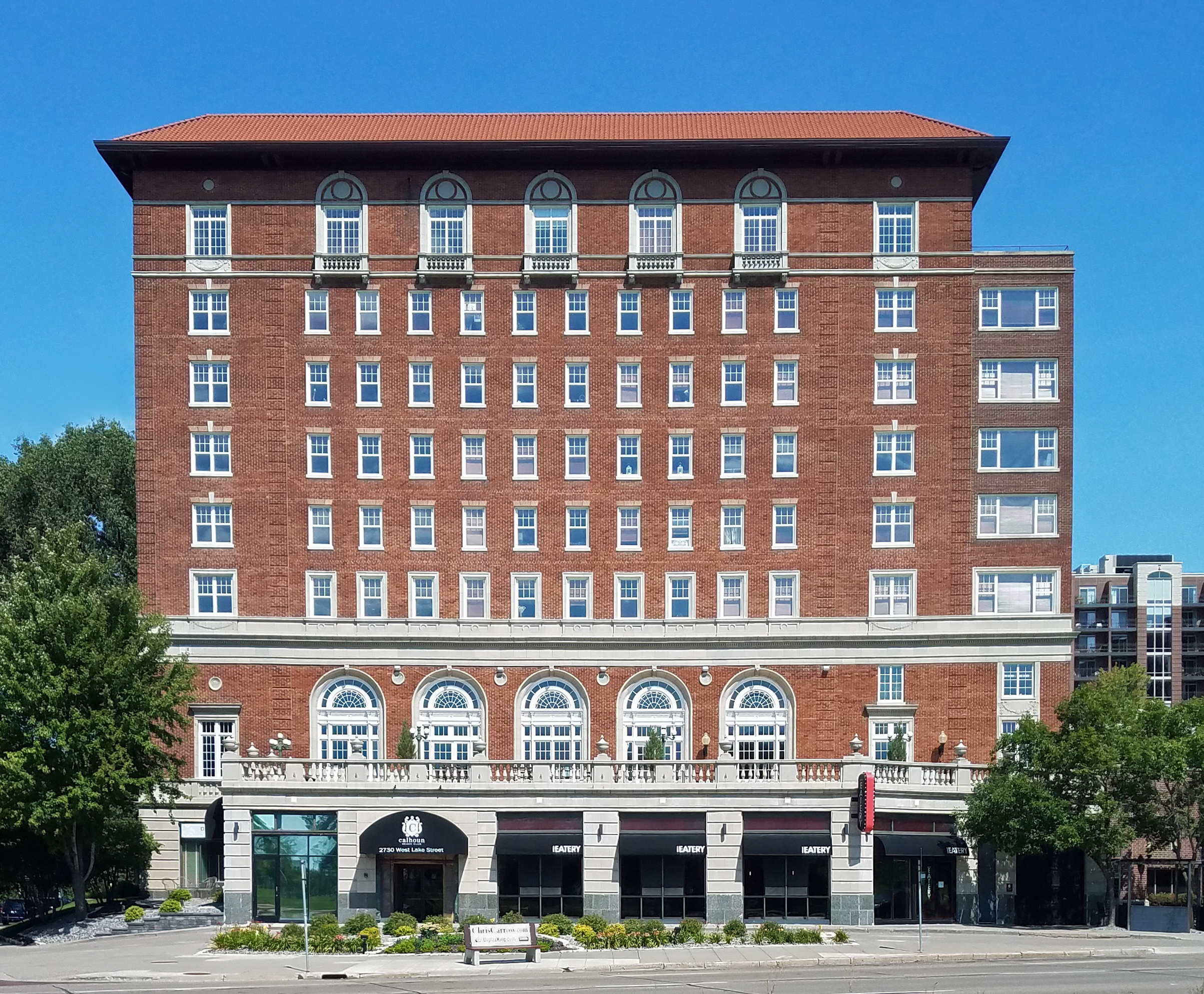
The Hamm Building (above) housed the studios of WMIN-TV between 1953 and 1955, while WTCN-TV originated from the Calhoun Beach Hotel between 1953 and 1974.

On September 1, 1953, channel 11 began broadcasting. At 2 p.m., the first WMIN-TV programs aired: a news show, the women's program Talk About the Town, and a movie. Two hours later, WTCN-TV greeted viewers with a dedication, the cooking show Man Around the House, and a teen music bandstand program, Corner Drug. Channel 11's signal originated from the Foshay Tower in downtown Minneapolis; the tower had a master antenna inspired by the Empire State Building in New York and designed to broadcast multiple stations, including the antenna for WCCO-TV and provision for antennas for channels 9 and 11 before any applicant had a construction permit for them.

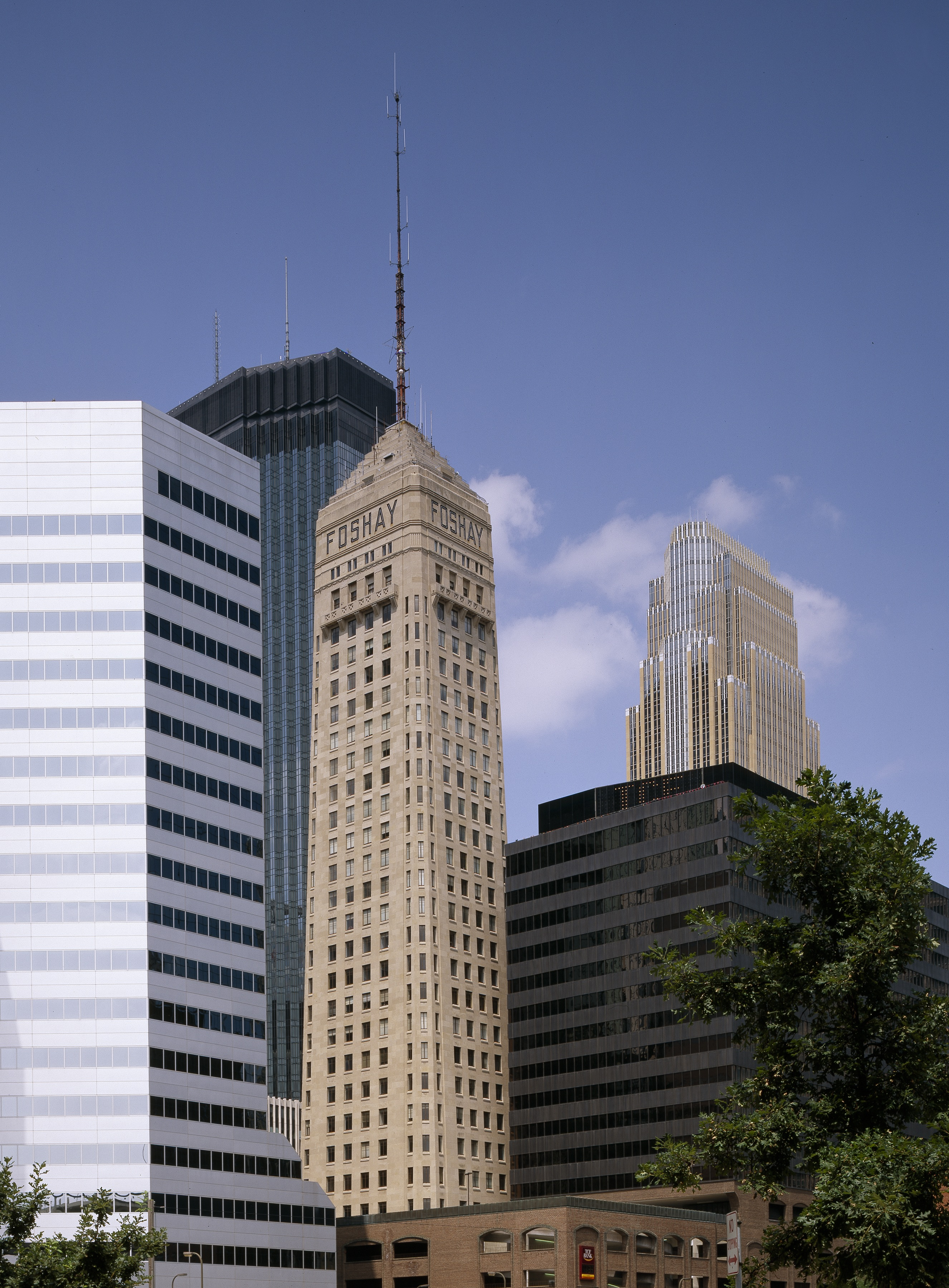
The Foshay Tower was designed to transmit channel 11 even before a construction permit had been awarded and did so between 1953 and 1971.

The transmitter and antenna were the only physical facilities shared by the stations. While WMIN-TV and WTCN-TV were affiliates of ABC, in keeping with WTCN radio, their programs and even network shows during each station's airtime originated from separate facilities. WMIN-TV set up in the former WMIN radio studios in the Hamm Building in St. Paul, the radio station having relocated to its transmitter site; it had no film developing equipment, so films had to be airmailed to and from sister station KELO-TV in Sioux Falls, South Dakota. WTCN-TV established itself in the Calhoun Beach Hotel in Minneapolis. The hotel offered the station the use of its ballroom; its former gymnasium, left unfinished when the former beach club converted to a hotel, became the largest TV studio to that time in the Twin Cities.

Each station offered its own local programs. WMIN had the children's show Captain 11, featuring host Jim Lange in a space-themed outfit. (Note: KELO-TV cloned Captain 11 for itself. In 1955, it sent Dave Dedrick to WMIN-TV to learn the role. In Sioux Falls, the program ran for 41 years until Dedrick's retirement in December 1996.) It also featured Wrangler Steve, a host of Westerns played by WMIN radio disc jockey Steve Cannon. For kids, WTCN had the clown J. P. Patches, originally played by Daryl Laub and then by Chris Wedes. Wedes left for the new KIRO-TV in Seattle in 1958; Patches aired on the Seattle station until 1981. For 19 years, Roger Awsumb played Casey Jones on WTCN's Lunch with Casey.

By 1954, channel 11 was offering some programming from the DuMont Television Network, though the network's shows moved to new station KEYD-TV (channel 9) when it launched in January 1955.

==== Consolidated consolidation and purchase by Time, Inc. ====
In January 1955, Consolidated Television and Radio Broadcasters of Indianapolis, a company owned by the Bitner family, agreed to acquire WTCN radio and television and WMIN-TV for about $3 million. Bitner believed that the channel 11 stations made for an attractive purchase because their values were artificially lowered by confusion stemming from the shared-station setup. It announced that it would keep the WTCN call letters. When Consolidated completed the purchase in April, WMIN left the air and merged into the full-time WTCN. At that time, the new owner consolidated the station's activities at WTCN's Minneapolis studios and closed WMIN's St. Paul facilities, with only a handful of WMIN technical employees not continuing with channel 11. During this time, the station affiliated with the NTA Film Network, which began in 1956.

The Bitner group had owned the WTCN stations for less than two years when it announced the sale of three of its broadcasting properties—the WTCN stations, WFBM radio and television in Indianapolis, and WLAV radio and television in Grand Rapids, Michigan—to Time, Inc. in December 1956. The $15.75 million deal came after the Crowell-Collier Publishing Company backed out of a transaction for the stations plus WFDF in Flint, Michigan. FCC approval followed in April 1957. Time improved station revenues by expanding its movie library and sharpening its promotion of feature films. It offered a large schedule of local sports, including select games of Minneapolis Millers minor league baseball, which WTCN radio broadcast all season long; the station cut back its sports broadcasts on radio and TV due to difficulty selling advertising time and intense competition, particularly for the radio broadcasts of Minnesota Golden Gophers football.

=== As an independent station ===
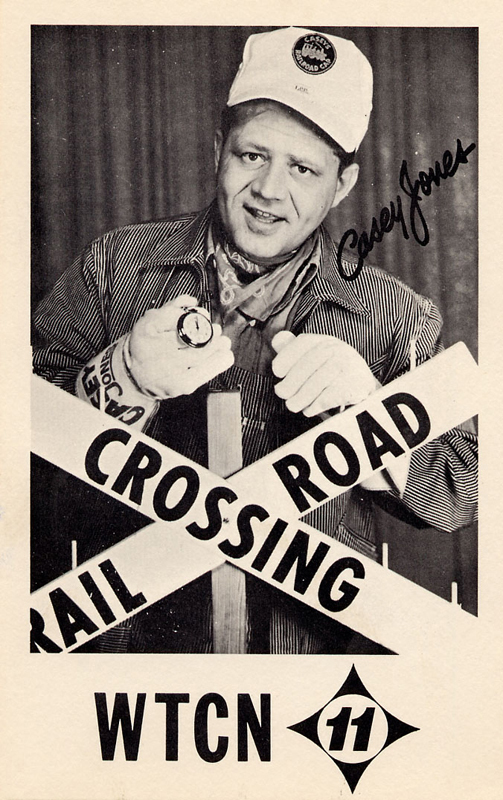
Roger Awsumb played Casey Jones on WTCN-TV's Lunch with Casey children's show for nearly two decades.

==== Loss of ABC affiliation ====
By the start of the 1960s, Time's relationship with ABC had become strained. Variety reported in March 1960 that station management was insisting on a protection clause, a guarantee that ABC would not go to KMSP-TV (channel 9), an independent station then owned by 20th Century Fox. KMSP was already carrying some ABC shows that were not seen on channel 11's schedule. Channel 11's fears were well-founded; in January 1961, ABC announced it would move its programs to KMSP effective April 16.

The newly independent channel 11 became the market's first station to telecast major league baseball with the newly relocated Minnesota Twins; WCCO-TV had agreed to broadcast the games, but CBS refused to allow the station to preempt prime-time network programs for baseball, forcing channel 4 to back out. The station agreed to telecast 50 night and weekend games, simulcast with WCCO radio, with Bob Wolff and Ray Scott as announcers. The Twins, movies, and feature programs became the station's top program draws, as well as newscasts timed to air just before the network affiliates, including hourly news breaks and a 9 p.m. newscast. To support its new local programming, the station expanded its footprint in the Calhoun Beach Hotel to include space on the lower level and acquired new equipment. Despite this, Time noted in its annual report that losing ABC was "forcing a re-adjustment to the economies of independent television station operations" at channel 11.

The Twins proved key to channel 11's survival without a network affiliation. Telecasts reached audience shares averaging 58 percent and as high as 79 percent in 1962. A major advertising contract with Hamm's beer for the baseball games helped the station acquire programming and get on steadier footing—its first profitable footing in its ten-year history. An American Research Bureau report found that the station had the largest relative audience share of any independent in the country, even in months without baseball. Twins games earned channel 11 placement on cable systems far from the Twin Cities, including Mankato and Rochester, Minnesota, and Eau Claire and La Crosse, Wisconsin. Building on the success of the Twins telecasts, the station sought to broaden its image as a sports outlet by adding wrestling (broadcast from the studio) and college sports to its lineup.

==== Chris-Craft ownership ====
In the three years Time owned WTCN-TV as an independent, it negotiated with several groups to sell the television station and WTCN radio. In July 1961, Variety reported that Chicago-based WGN Inc. was considering buying WTCN-TV from Time; other buyers looked at and passed on the station at this time. A Twin Cities–based consortium agreed to pay $2 million for the WTCN stations in 1963 but failed to come up with the money. Chris-Craft Industries agreed to purchase WTCN-TV alone for $4 million in a deal announced in May 1964; it was the company's third TV property after two other independents, KCOP in Los Angeles and KPTV in Portland, Oregon. WTCN radio was sold separately to the Buckley-Jaeger Company and became WWTC that October.

Chris-Craft fortified the station's children's and movie offerings to complement its strong sports coverage. The children's relaunch included a kids club and 6 1/2 hours a day of weekday shows promoted as "Kidville 11". The company stated in its 1965 annual report that WTCN-TV's performance "exceeded expectations". By 1966, the Twins games were being fed by WTCN-TV to a network of 15 television stations, which grew to 16 with the inclusion of WVTV in Milwaukee the next year; the Twins were joined on channel 11 in 1967 by the new Minnesota North Stars hockey team.

In June 1971, WTCN-TV joined other local stations in moving its tower to the Telefarm site in Shoreview, Minnesota. The relocation to the newer, taller masts was necessitated because of the construction of the IDS Center, a Minneapolis skyscraper that shaded many viewers from the Foshay Tower site. The new tower, which was shared by the former Foshay stations—WCCO-TV, KSTP-TV, and WTCN-TV—collapsed on September 7 during further construction work, killing seven workers. In lieu of the collapsed candelabra, Telefarm proposed constructing one tower for WTCN-TV and an FM station and another for WCCO and KSTP. The replacements were erected in late 1972.

==== Metromedia ownership ====
We are in negotiations for a very large station and, frankly, we need the cash. ... We're sorry to sell it. We did a lot for them and it did a lot for us. It was a loser when we bought it.

— A Chris-Craft official, on selling WTCN-TV

Chris-Craft announced the sale of WTCN-TV to Metromedia for $18 million on July 29, 1971. Chris-Craft sold the station as part of its pursuit of a large-market VHF television station elsewhere. After taking over, Metromedia made major changes in the station's programming. Citing declining ratings and a company policy against live children's hosts, Lunch with Casey finished its run at the end of 1972. Channel 11 dropped the Twins, also due to falling viewership, with the team moving telecasts to WCCO-TV; the team returned to channel 11 in 1975. Under Metromedia, WTCN-TV became one of the nation's most financially lucrative independent stations, even though it was less profitable than the network affiliates.

Metromedia's purchase of WTCN-TV included a parcel of land at the corner of Boone Avenue and Minnesota State Highway 55 in Golden Valley, intended for the construction of new studios. Metromedia broke ground on a $5 million, 65,000-square-foot (6,000 m^{2}) studio complex on the site in May 1973; it featured two broadcast studios, an outdoor sculpture garden, and space for Metromedia's corporate art collection.

While the network affiliates intensified their competition for the news audience, WTCN's small news effort—a 9:30 p.m. newscast known as Total News—was not considered much of a factor in the market, although it was just behind KMSP-TV in total viewers. Until moving to Golden Valley, all the station's news film was developed by a company in downtown Minneapolis that closed at dinnertime, preventing the broadcast of late-breaking news items. Gil Amundson doubled as the news director and anchor. WTCN had the only TV news team in the market without a professional meteorologist. TV Guide ran a feature calling WTCN the real-life equivalent to WJM-TV, the Minneapolis station depicted on The Mary Tyler Moore Show.

=== Affiliating with NBC ===
KMSP-TV, the Twin Cities' ABC affiliate, was a distant third in the news ratings race. Channel 9 was traditionally the most profitable station in the market, but under Donald Swartz, it was a lean operation with a reputation for penny-pinching. As early as 1974, KMSP was rumored to have made changes to its news operation to appease the network, which threatened to re-affiliate with WTCN, and further rumors of network dissatisfaction with KMSP's news effort surfaced in 1977. Channel 9's news budget was reportedly less than half that of WCCO-TV or KSTP-TV. In the late 1970s, as ABC soared to number one in the national ratings, the network began a campaign to upgrade its affiliate base and approached WCCO-TV, KSTP-TV, and WTCN-TV. KSTP-TV, the NBC affiliate and the market's news ratings leader, wished to expand its signal beyond the Twin Cities to take advantage of recently relaxed rules relating to the feeding of broadcast translators by microwave transmission, and there were fewer ABC affiliates in surrounding areas—notably Alexandria and Eau Claire—than NBC affiliates. On August 29, 1978, KSTP announced it would switch from NBC to ABC in March 1979, ending a 50-year relationship between KSTP and NBC dating to the days of radio. The size of the market and tenure of KSTP with NBC made the switch particularly stunning; KSTP's defection was seen as a coup, the largest engineered by the network.

Even before KSTP's affiliation switch was publicly announced, NBC reached out to Metromedia as it began to evaluate KMSP-TV and WTCN-TV for potential affiliation with the network. As part of the process, it reached out to former employees of KMSP-TV, at least one of whom told NBC that its management "didn't care about news" and that it was "a stepchild of their operation". At the end of September, NBC announced its decision: it would affiliate with WTCN-TV. The network picked channel 11 over channel 9 on the strength of its facilities and performance.

In reaching a deal, Metromedia promised NBC that it would launch a "first-class news operation" for the station, which was weak in the area of news (though better than many independents) and had a news staff totaling 10 people at the time. Most of the $4 million Metromedia spent ahead of the affiliation switch was invested in the news department, on new reporters, largely coming from TV stations in the South; a new news set; weather radar; and electronic news gathering, replacing film. The only member of the news department who did not continue after the switch was weather anchor Toni Hughes, who had presented channel 11's weathercasts for a decade; she was dismissed because she was not a meteorologist. Though she was technically a freelancer, her duties for WTCN prevented her from simultaneously working for another station.

WTCN-TV became the Twin Cities' NBC affiliate on March 5, 1979. Ahead of the switch, the station launched a $1 million promotional campaign titled "We've Got It Now", featuring billboards of such NBC stars as Johnny Carson, a visit by network president Fred Silverman and other NBC stars, and the live broadcast of Today from Minneapolis. That same day, NewsCenter 11 launched with weeknight news anchor Jim Dyer, meteorologist Glenn Burns, and sportscaster Bob Kurtz. (Note: Not Bob Kurtz, who called Minnesota North Stars hockey games.)

NewsCenter 11 arrived on the air as a strident production that local viewers instantly recognized as foreign to their tastes. From its sickening theme music to its cream puff wrap-up features by Chick McCuen, NewsCenter 11 has been a commercial failure.

— John Carman, The Minneapolis Star

==== NewsCenter 11: Lackluster performance ====
NewsCenter 11 was a ratings and critical disaster. Neal Gendler in the Minneapolis Tribune was unimpressed and found the program pedestrian, formulaic, overdone, and out of tune with Twin Cities viewers' tastes. He criticized Kurtz for laughing at skiers in bikinis, writing, "Someone also ought to let him in on a fact of Minnesota life: Sexism is out of style." John Carman of The Minneapolis Star called it "a near-perfect case history of how not to put together a successful and respected news operation", calling its format too conventional and Gil Amundson (later relieved of news director duties) too weak a leader. Carman and Karl Vick (also of The Minneapolis Star) assigned some blame for the failure to the direction of the station by out-of-town consultants—particularly Ted Kavanau, the former news director of Metromedia's WNEW-TV in New York—and executives unfamiliar with the market. Kavanau wanted a tabloid-style newscast in the mold of WNEW and hired people for such a program, but general manager Robert Fransen believed a more conventional format was advisable in the market and prevailed in a meeting of Metromedia executives.

In its first ratings survey, the station placed fourth out of three newscasts (and KMSP, airing entertainment shows) at 6 p.m., enough to be described as "about as popular as the measles" by Vick in The Star; its performance was so poor that the station, having pledged advertisers a certain level of viewership, had to offer costly makegood ads. During NBC prime time, the station had 21 percent of the audience, half of which left for other stations during the 10 p.m. news, but viewers returned to channel 11 to watch The Tonight Show Starring Johnny Carson. The station attracted 8 to 10 percent of the evening news audience, far behind KSTP and WCCO, which commanded shares of 30 percent or more. The station's poor performance also sank the NBC network newscasts, which fell to third place. Meanwhile, freed of its network programming and having picked up the North Stars and Twins rights, KMSP-TV became one of the nation's leading independents, beating NewsCenter 11 in the ratings just as WTCN had done when KMSP was an ABC affiliate. Kevin O'Brien, WTCN's general manager at the time, later told The Mercury News that switching to NBC "tore that station asunder because we didn't have that much time to plan such a dramatic change".

While the news product improved under new news director Brink Chipman and as reporters settled into the market, turmoil engulfed the troubled newsroom. An investigative reporter was fired in July before her reports even appeared on air due to poor-quality work. Dyer, unhappy nearly from the start, was switched with weekend anchor Stan Bohrman in August and left in December. At year's end, Kurtz was taken off the weeknight newscasts and replaced with Tom Ryther, formerly of KSTP-TV, returning to the Twin Cities from WKYC-TV in Cleveland. Burns was the last of the original three news presenters to leave WTCN; in January 1982, he accepted a position with WSB-TV in Atlanta, where he would spend 40 years. Ratings improved modestly when channel 11 shifted its early newscast from 6 to 5:30 p.m., moving it out of direct competition with WCCO and KSTP, though it still trailed the national newscasts they offered at that time. This did not stanch turmoil in the newsroom, nor did it forestall Metromedia from shuttering the profitable Metro Productions commercial production unit of WTCN in December 1980. One bright spot for the station was a 1982 series on herpes reported by anchor John Bachman, Herpes Is Forever, which won an Alfred I. duPont–Columbia University Award.

To increase revenue, which lagged behind other major-market network affiliates, Metromedia ceased airing the network's The Tomorrow Show in favor of sitcoms from which it earned all the advertising, doing the same with the occasional network movie. In early 1982, the station temporarily lost the ability to air the Tonight Show; NBC strictly enforced the show airing at 10:30 p.m. and would take the show to another station in the market if it was aired on tape delay, which WTCN did to air syndicated repeats of M*A*S*H. WTCN defended its decision by citing Carson's older demographics at a time when his ratings were slipping nationally. When KMSP refused to air Tonight for the same reason, NBC was forced to acquiesce to WTCN's delay. Asked in 1981 by the Boston Herald American to appraise Metromedia's management of WTCN, M. Howard Gelfand of the Minneapolis Tribune noted that "it has taken WTCN-TV ... just a couple of years to turn a silk purse into a sow's ear".

=== Gannett purchase and news overhaul ===
In August 1982, Metromedia agreed to buy WFLD, an independent station in Chicago. It needed to sell one TV station and a Chicago radio station to stay within ownership limits, but it chose to divest itself of a second TV station to raise the money necessary for the $136 million purchase—the second-highest for a single station—without incurring debt. First to be sold was WXIX-TV, an independent station in Cincinnati, followed by WTCN-TV, acquired by the Gannett Company for $75 million. Gannett, in turn, needed to sell one VHF television station to make room in its portfolio and chose KARK-TV in Little Rock, Arkansas, for divestiture.

We're coming in here humbly with the understanding that we have a lot of problems and trying to figure out what we have to do in order to do a good news job. Gannett is in the news business, and that's what we're proud of. We better have the best source of local news and information that we can offer to the public or else we're down the drain.

— Jeffrey Davidson, president of broadcasting, Gannett

Gannett took control of WTCN in April 1983 and began implementing a top-to-bottom overhaul of the station's local news programming, promising to raise its quality to match WCCO and KSTP. A new station manager and vice president of news were brought in, both from KBTV, Gannett's market-leading station in Denver, to replace the existing management which remained with Metromedia. Nearly immediately, the new management moved to distance the news product from its image under Metromedia, changing the name from NewsCenter 11 to 11 News, similar to the 9 News title used by KBTV. Armed with research identifying WCCO and KSTP as having older-skewing viewership and seeing a void for a newscast for a younger audience, the station added as many as 40 new staff members in addition to the 40 that it had at the time of purchase—compared to 100 apiece for the newsrooms at WCCO-TV and KSTP-TV. To keep pace with its competitors, the station acquired a news helicopter, as well as new cameras and vehicles.

Gannett filled the meteorologist position, left unfilled on a permanent basis since Burns's departure in January 1982, by hiring Paul Douglas, who had worked for the Satellite News Channel. The station cut a hole through the wall of its studio to create an outdoor weather set for Douglas's forecasts. It replaced the existing anchor pairing of John Bachman and Cora-Ann Mihalik (Note: Mihalik's tenure at WTCN was very short-lived. She arrived at the station in January as a weekend anchor, was promoted to weeknight news in June, was demoted back to weekends with the hiring of Magers and Pierce, then left at the end of November for WLS-TV in Chicago.) with Paul Magers and Diana Pierce, both hired in August from California stations. The station increased its emphasis on news photography; in addition to hiring anchors, it hired new news photographers.

The revamped newscasts debuted quietly in September 1983. Along with the new anchor team and set improvements, the newscasts were rebranded News 11, the second change in title in three months. Ratings did not improve immediately, but they began to rise slowly as early as November 1983. By November 1984, the station had increased its audience share at 10 p.m. to 15 percent, a significant increase from the previous year. The gap with second-place KSTP narrowed as the station increased its audience share to 23 percent by February 1986.

==== Two call sign changes in a year ====
The FCC liberalized rules around call signs in late 1983. Gannett—the publisher of USA Today—acquired the rights to the call sign KUSA in early 1984 and won approval to use the letters on the former KBTV in Denver after years of being stymied under the old rules. While Gannett initially intended to do the same immediately after acquiring WTCN-TV, it instead focused on rebuilding the news operation and beating back a challenge to the KUSA assignment from the USA Network cable service. After Gannett won that fight, it sought and received permission to change WTCN-TV's call sign to WUSA effective July 4, 1985. The new designation replaced WTCN-TV—a call sign associated with the station's independent days—at a time when the station was finally becoming a local news competitor.

The WUSA call letters lasted less than one year in Minneapolis. Gannett acquired the Evening News Association in February 1986; among its holdings was WDVM, the CBS affiliate in Washington, D.C., near Gannett's corporate headquarters in nearby Rosslyn, Virginia. From the moment Gannett took that station over, it mulled moving the WUSA call letters to Washington to provide a solid co-association with USA Today as well as Washington being the nation's capital. In March, John Carmody of The Washington Post reported that Gannett had instructed the Minneapolis station to come up with a new call sign. The station reached a deal with a radio station in Atchison, Kansas, that had used the KARE call sign since 1949 to use "KARE" and switched to it on June 11. The new designation was in keeping with the station's heavy community service component since its acquisition by Gannett, including an awards event titled "11 Who Care". This freed its new sister station, channel 9 in Washington, to switch from WDVM to WUSA.

==== Ratings rise ====
We questioned their news judgment. Was it news, or news entertainment? ... This place said we'd get our news from lots of different places, not just the Capitol, City Hall, the courts and the classic news beats, but from within the community. They got out and talked to people, they found things that were interesting, not necessarily newsworthy. They looked for story ideas by listening to what people were talking about.

— Tom Lindner, WCCO-TV news manager and producer in the 1980s, later KARE news director

Channel 11's rising news fortunes continued after the call sign change to KARE, coinciding with a turnaround in ratings for the NBC network. Weeks after becoming KARE came another pivotal moment. On July 18, 1986, helicopter pilot Max Messmer was in the air headed to an assignment when he heard that a funnel cloud was forming in Brooklyn Park, eventually touching down in Fridley. He piloted the helicopter, known as Sky 11, to the scene and ad-libbed commentary as the aircraft flew within a quarter-mile of the tornado. The tornado coverage aired live on KARE's 5 p.m. newscast, providing startling pictures of the storm. It was the first time a tornado had been filmed from creation to dissipation. The newscast was a ratings milestone for the station—in 2011, Douglas recalled that it led many WCCO and KSTP viewers to sample KARE's news—and the raw footage was widely requested by scientists and meteorologists.

In 1986, the station took the lead among the coveted demographic of adults 25–54, a demographic with which it placed first in all but one ratings survey between 1986 and 2000. In October 1986, the station notched its first-ever second-place finish in local news ratings, sending KSTP-TV's 10 p.m. news to third. But the station lagged badly in early evening news, contending that its younger viewers were still at work and not able to watch 5 or 6 p.m. newscasts. The July 1987 sweeps period brought another historic achievement for KARE: it finished first at 10 p.m., with an audience share of 29 percent. This momentum was sustained through late 1987 and early 1988, even as an expansion to the Twin Cities market gave WCCO an edge in counting viewers in Alexandria. The ratings increase boosted the station's bottom line, as the cost of a 30-second commercial during channel 11's newscasts rose from $200 in 1983 to as much as $2,300 by 1987.

KARE attracted criticism for its newscasts' style: trendy and designed to draw an emotional response. The latter was evident in its photojournalism style, which the Star Tribune later called "highly visual and emotional"; KARE became a regular winner of National Press Photographers Association awards. This prompted WCCO-TV, a station known for its hard news format, to become more image-conscious, and the other TV news outlets in the Twin Cities began incorporating longer, photojournalism-driven stories into their newscasts. KARE became the first Twin Cities station to offer closed captioning of its local news in 1988. When the Minnesota Poll in 1988 found KARE's viewership concentrated among young adults, Noel Holston of the Star Tribune predicted that the station could be dominant "for years to come" based on the age of its news watchers.

In September 1988, Pat Miles left her job at WCCO-TV and signed a five-year agreement to work at KARE, including a year where she could not appear on camera under a non-compete clause. The pact brought Miles, who wanted more personal time, together with channel 11, seeking an anchor to improve the lagging ratings of its early evening newscasts. Meanwhile, WCCO found renewed ratings strength and pushed KARE back to second.

Under the leadership of general manager Linda Rios Brook, from 1989 to 1991, the station tried several unsuccessful initiatives, most notably a morning talk show titled Between Friends that failed to make an impact in the ratings, but its newscasts regained the local news lead for the first time in several years. Rios Brook resigned after mixed programming results and a controversy over her evangelical Christianity and resurfaced in the market as the president and general manager of family-oriented KLGT. At KARE, she was replaced by Hank Price, who had managed WFMY-TV in Greensboro, North Carolina. In 1992, KARE became one of the television homes of the NBA's Minnesota Timberwolves, joining KITN-TV (channel 29, now WFTC) and effectively replacing KSTP-TV with seven to eight games a year of a 25-game broadcast TV package. This was the first time since carrying the Twins as an independent station that channel 11 had broadcast local professional sports. Beginning in 1994, KLGT replaced KITN-TV in the arrangement. By the 2000–01 season, KARE had 15 games and channel 23, by then known as KMWB, had 20. The team moved its broadcast games to WFTC ahead of the 2001–02 season.

In the early 1990s, two of the original team of anchors that made KARE a competitor in the 1980s left. The more acrimonious departure was that of sportscaster Tom Ryther, who was forced out in 1991 after suing the station for age discrimination. Ryther alleged that his job duties had been progressively reduced in order to bring younger faces—such as his replacement, Jeff Passolt—on screen. KARE defended itself by pointing to research from 1990 that it conducted on local TV personalities. Ryther's lawsuit was successful; a jury issued a $715,000 judgment in his favor in 1993. KARE appealed, but a federal appeals court upheld the verdict in 1996, and the Supreme Court rejected KARE's final appeal in 1997. In 1994, Douglas departed KARE in search of a job closer to family in the eastern U.S. He was replaced by weekend meteorologist Ken Barlow on the weeknight newscasts.

The 1990s were a decade of strength for KARE news. The station continued its domination of viewers 25–54 while narrowly trailing or narrowly leading WCCO-TV in total ratings in late news, though channel 4 had more total viewers for its early evening newscasts. During the decade, KARE added Saturday morning newscasts, in 1992.

KARE aired the locally produced game show Let's Bowl for several years in the late 1990s; it ran after Saturday Night Live. The audience support for the program was sufficient to help its creators, Tim Scott and Rick Kronfeld, secure a pickup for their show from the Comedy Central cable channel.

=== Post-2000 ===
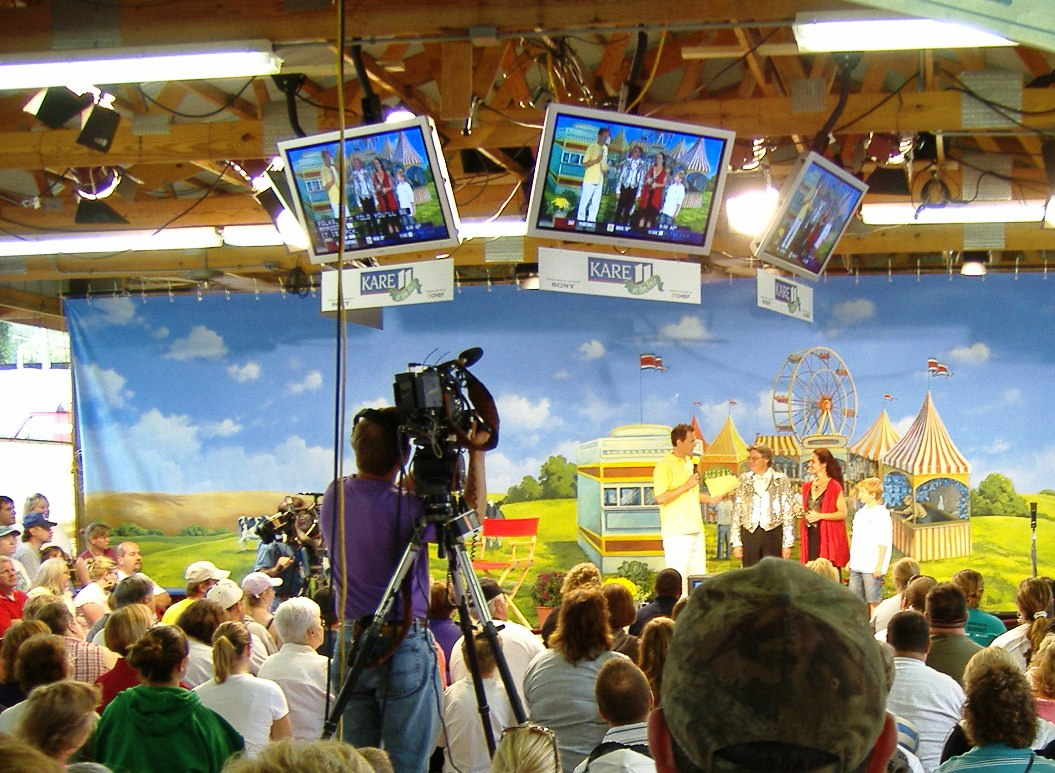
KARE at the Minnesota State Fair, 2006

KARE launched a high-definition digital signal on channel 35 on August 31, 2001. KARE and WCCO on the Telefarm tower had intended to launch digital service as early as November 1999, but bad weather and high demand for tower crews stalled the project.

Magers—the anchor commonly credited with helping KARE remain number one in late evening news—left the station in 2003 to work for KCBS-TV in Los Angeles, ending the Magers–Pierce tandem that had become the longest-running anchor duo in the Twin Cities. Without Magers—and what competitor Don Shelby called his "magical formula"—on channel 11, interest heightened in the local stations' ratings performance. Frank Vascellaro, the man hired to replace Magers on the anchor desk, was the husband of WCCO evening news anchor Amelia Santaniello. Vascellaro's departure in 2005 coincided with that of Barlow, who was hired by WBZ-TV in Boston. In the wake of these departures and the replacement of Vascellaro by Mike Pomeranz on the anchor desk, WCCO slowly crept closer to KARE and then took the lead in 2006, with a swing of three percent of the audience share to WCCO. When Pomeranz left to take a position with the San Diego Padres in 2012, sports anchor Randy Shaver moved to the news desk.

The station experimented with several formats for its mid-morning program. In 2006, it replaced KARE 11 Today with a new program, Showcase Minnesota, that also featured advertiser-paid sponsored segments. It was replaced in 2011 with a revival of KARE 11 Today; Pierce left her evening anchor duties to host the revamped show and KARE's 4 p.m. newscast.

The loss of ratings momentum continued in the early 2010s, as KARE slumped while WCCO locked up most of the number-one positions by demographic and time slot. A special month of newscasts by WCCO led that station to its first 25–54 win in late news since 1986. While, as of 2022, KARE has been competitive—particularly in the 25–54 demographic—WCCO has generally been the market leader in total viewers. Pierce retired in 2016 after taking a buyout package offered by Tegna, which became the new name for the former Gannett broadcast division when its TV stations and newspapers split into separate companies in 2015.

The KARE newsroom won multiple national journalism awards in the late 2010s and early 2020s. Three different investigative series together won the Alfred I. duPont–Columbia University Award in 2017, followed by two awards in 2020 for On the Veteran Beat and Love Them First. An investigation on prisons, Cruel and Unusual, won the duPont–Columbia in 2022; the next year, the station won another duPont–Columbia for a series on violent criminals titled The Gap: Failure to Treat, Failure to Protect. This series also won a Peabody Award, the second for the station after a joint award to KARE and KUSA in Denver in 2022.

KARE, which relocated its digital signal from its pre-transition UHF channel 35 to VHF channel 11 upon the digital transition in 2009, was approved in 2020 to relocate to UHF channel 31 to aid reception after the spectrum incentive auction. The station switched to the new UHF signal on October 20, 2021.

On December 11, 2024, KARE announced an agreement with the Timberwolves to simulcast five games with FanDuel Sports Network North during the 2024–25 season. The deal also included the rights to simulcast pre- and post-game coverage. This marked the first time since 2000–01 that the Timberwolves were aired locally on KARE. In May 2025, KARE announced a similar agreement with the WNBA's Minnesota Lynx to simulcast four games with FanDuel Sports Network North.

A transformer at the KARE studios in Golden Valley exploded on July 22, 2025, causing a power outage and subsequent evacuation of the facility. The resulting fire was quickly contained, but station operations were disrupted; the station presented its evening newscasts from the transmitter site in Shoreview and flew its morning anchors to sister station WXIA-TV in Atlanta, where they presented the morning newscast the next day. WXIA had a second studio and control room with capacity to produce the additional newscast. The incident resulted primarily in smoke damage to the building.

Nexstar Media Group acquired Tegna in a deal announced in August 2025 and completed in March 2026, though integration action on the merger was later halted by a federal judge.

== Notable on-air staff ==
=== Current ===
- Boyd Huppert – reporter since 1996, national storytelling coach for Tegna

=== Former ===
- Andre Bernier – weekday morning meteorologist, 1980s
- Asha Blake – reporter and anchor, early 1990s
- Dennis Bounds – weekend news anchor, 1980–1982
- Bernie Grace – crime news reporter, 1979–2006
- Jack Horner – sportscaster

== Technical information ==
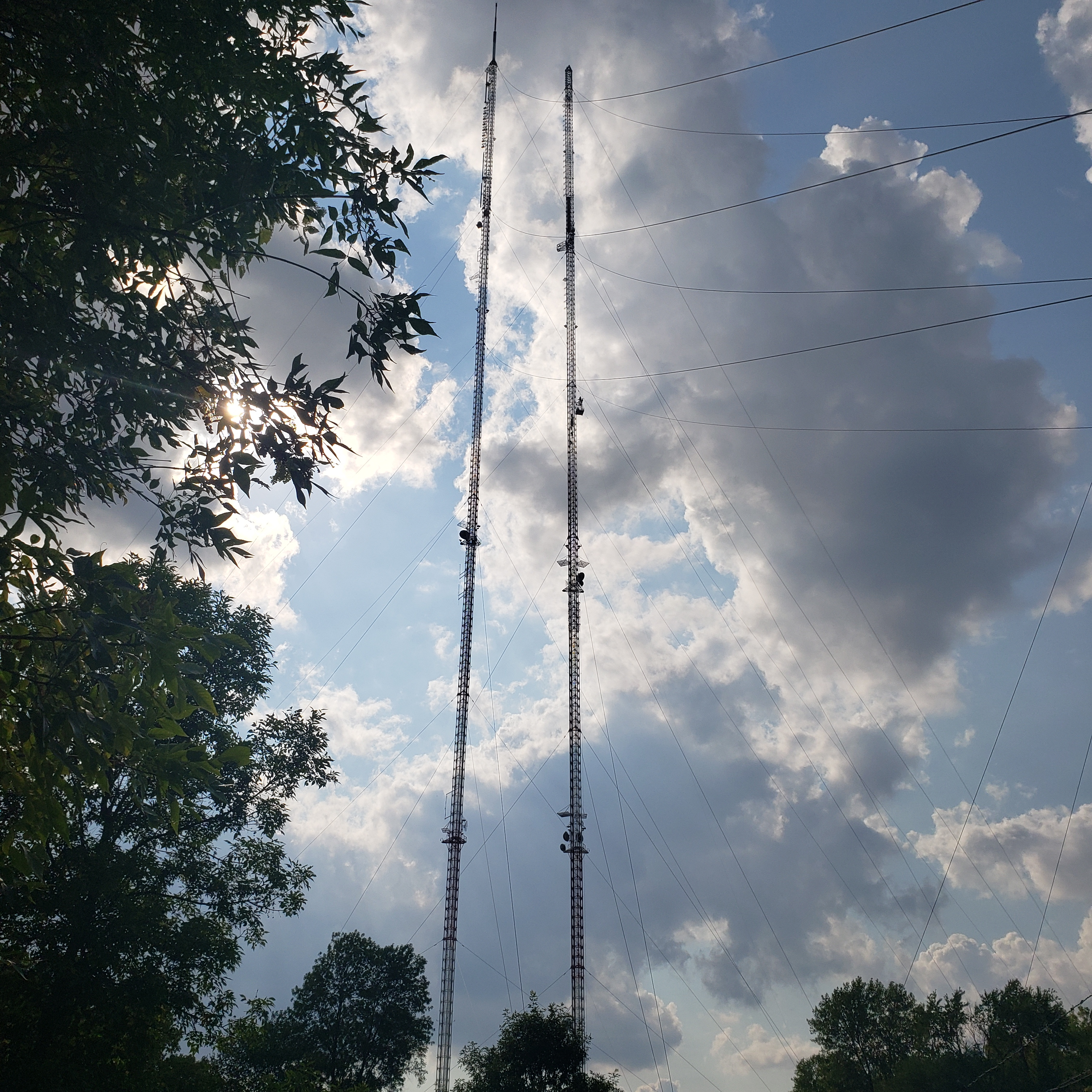
KARE's tower site at the Telefarm Towers in Shoreview, Minnesota

=== Subchannels ===
KARE is broadcast from a tower at the Telefarm Towers in Shoreview, Minnesota. Its signal is multiplexed:

Subchannels of KARE
Subchannel	Res.	Short name	Programming
11.1	1080i	KARE-HD	NBC
11.2	480i	Quest	Quest
11.3	480i	Crime	True Crime Network
11.4	480i	SHOP LC	Shop LC
11.5	480i	NEST	The Nest
11.7	480i	365BLK	365BLK
11.8	480i	HSN	HSN
23.5	480i	Rewind	Rewind TV (WUCW)

Broadcast on behalf of another station

=== Translators ===
Transmitter locations for KARE's translator network. Click on each marker to reveal details.; Originating station; Low-power translators

In addition to the main transmitter in Shoreview, KARE's signal is relayed to outlying parts of Minnesota through a network of translators owned by various translator associations.

- Alexandria: K14LZ-D
- Frost: K31EF-D (11.1 as 11.4)
- Jackson: K19HZ-D (11.1 as 11.4)
- Olivia: K20JY-D
- Redwood Falls: K22KU-D
- St. James: K32GX-D (11.1 as 11.4)
- Walker: K24KT-D (11.1 as 24.1)
- Willmar: K17FA-D

KARE formerly had a translator serving Breezy Point and Brainerd, KLKS-LP (channel 14), which was owned by the Lakes Broadcasting Group, owner of KLKS radio. The repeater signed on in 1995 and operated until July 16, 2011, when its use as a repeater of KARE was discontinued due to a corporate decision made by Gannett management.
