= Martin Olav Sabo Post Office =

Central post office in Minneapolis, Minnesota

Coordinates: 44°59′00″N 93°15′54″W

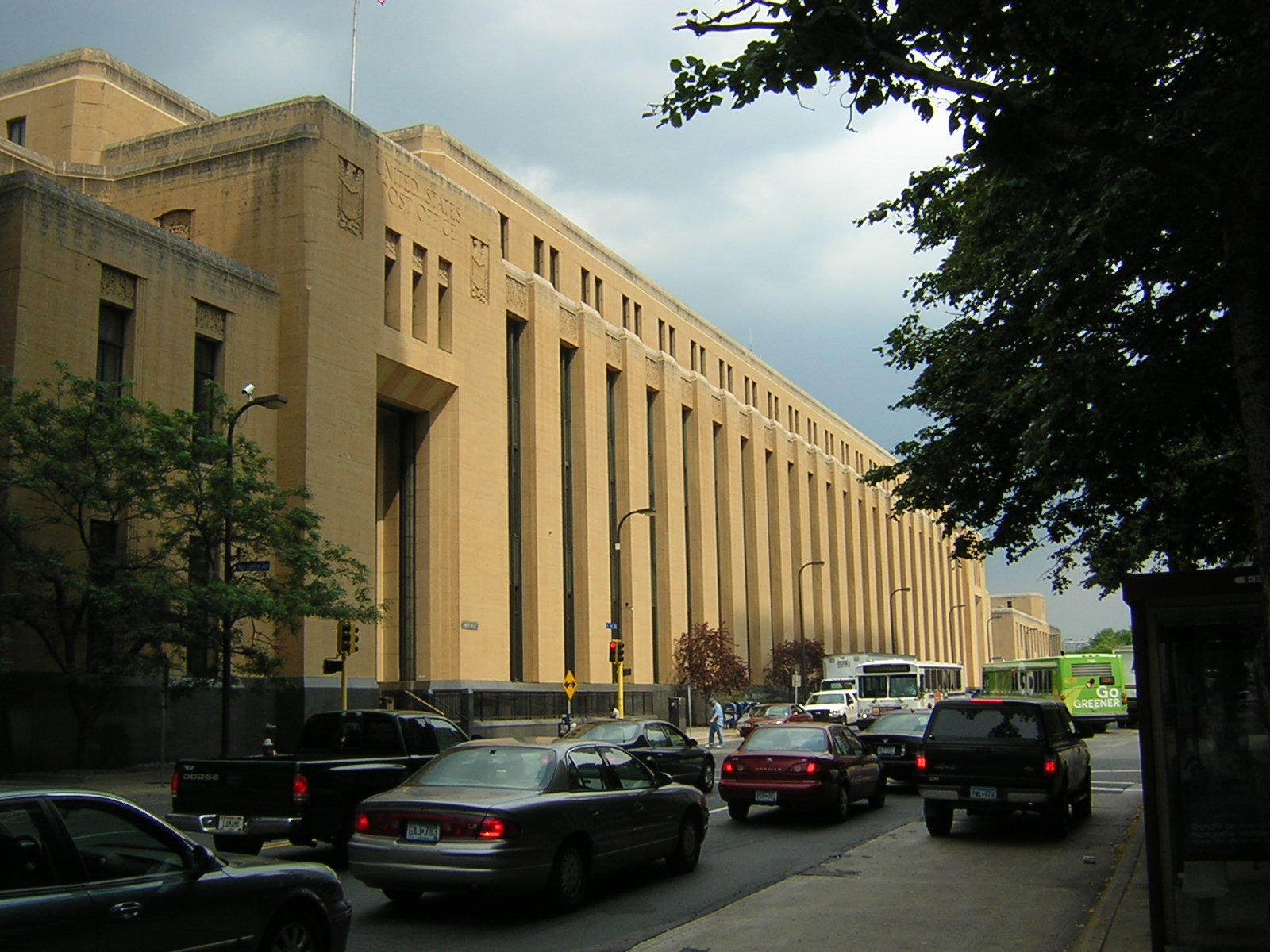
- The main building of the Minneapolis Post Office, viewed from 1st Street
- Interactive map of the Martin Olav Sabo Post Office area

General information
- Type: Post office
- Architectural style: Art Deco
- Location: 100 South 1st Street, Minneapolis, MN, United States
- Completed: 1933
- Cost: $4.5 million
- Owner: United States Postal Service

Dimensions
- Other dimensions: 540 feet (165 m) long

Design and construction
- Architect: Léon Eugène Arnal
- Architecture firm: Magney & Tusler
- Minneapolis Post Office
- U.S. Historic district – Contributing property
- Part of: St. Anthony Falls Historic District (ID71000438)
- Designated CP: March 11, 1971

The Martin Olav Sabo Post Office is the central post office for the city of Minneapolis, Minnesota in the United States. Located on the west bank of the Mississippi River, the facility extends west to east from Hennepin Avenue Bridge to the Third Avenue Bridge and north to south from the West River Parkway on the Grand Rounds Scenic Byway to First Street. Its ZIP code is 55401.

== History ==
Ard Godfrey operated the area's first post office in the village of Saint Anthony on the Mississippi's east bank during the early 1850s. At first unpredictably, deliveries came by messenger from Fort Snelling through Saint Paul, Minnesota. Later, mail arrived by stagecoach every ten to fourteen days. The first post office in Minneapolis was built on the west bank on High Street in 1854 and operated by postmaster Hezekiah Fletcher.

The present day post office was completed in 1933 and occupies nearly the same site. The main building faced Pioneer Square park, which is now occupied by an apartment tower. A companion federal office building at a right angle to the post office on the park's western perimeter was suggested in 1934 but not built.

A seven-level parking ramp and loading dock for bulk mail were added to the west in 1976.

In 2023, it was renamed in honor of former Minnesota Congressman Martin Olav Sabo.

== Structure and interior ==
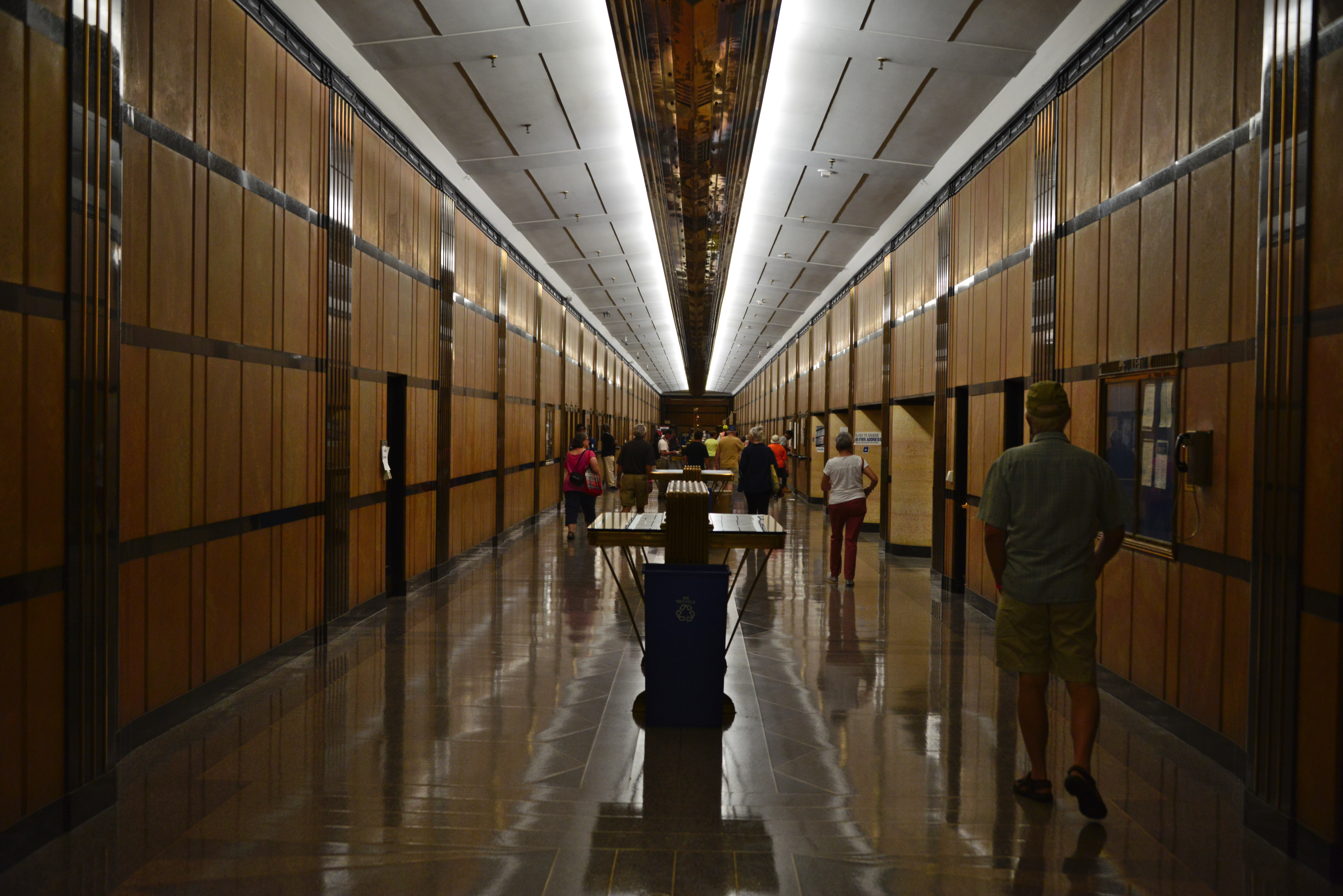
Main interior corridor

The post office was built of granite and stone in the PWA Moderne Art Deco style at the cost of $4.5 million or about $64 million in 2006 USD. Léon Eugène Arnal, the chief designer for the architects Magney & Tusler, designed the building. Between 1885 and 1946, Magney & Tusler designed the post office, and designed or co-designed the Foshay Tower downtown, the Calhoun Beach Club on Bde Maka Ska, the Lehmann Center on Lake Street, the Young-Quinlan Department Store on the Nicollet Mall and the former home of Teener's Theatrical costume and props store on Hennepin Avenue among other buildings in Minneapolis. The firm was later known as Setter, Leach & Lindstrom, acquired by Leo A. Daly in 2003.

The main building is 540 feet (165 m) long. Its interior is unchanged and postal customers still utilize its original bronze teller cages and fixtures, marble terrazzo floor and sandstone walls. Perhaps the longest light fixture in the world, a 350-foot (107 m), 16-ton (16256.8 kg) bronze chandelier runs the length of the lobby, originally designed to regulate temperature.

Peepholes were installed in the corridors so that inspectors could protect the mail and observe employees. The main building contained a three-room suite paneled in walnut for the postmaster, recreation rooms and a hospital unit for employees as well as a rifle range in the basement.

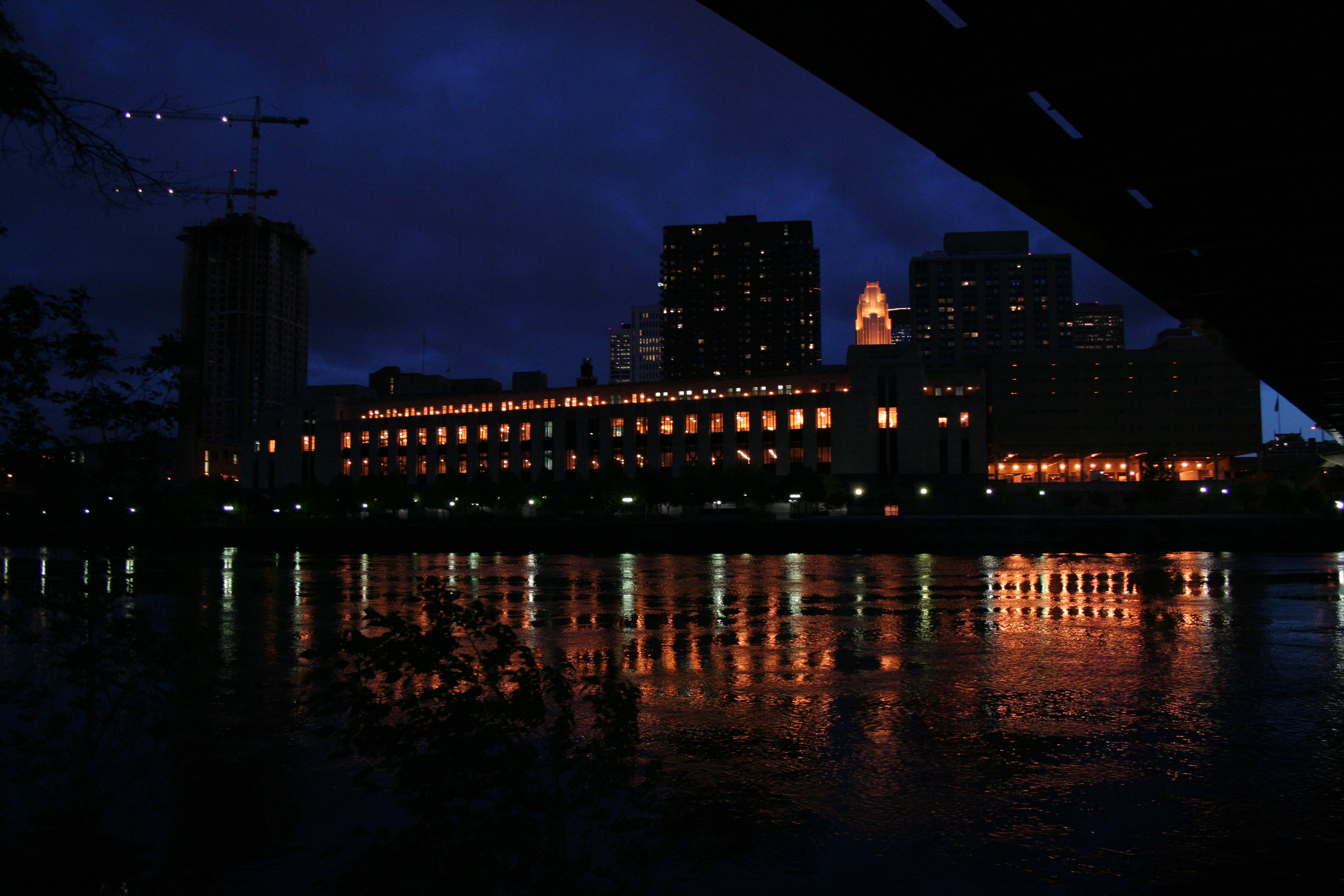
Post office on the Mississippi River at night, seen from under the Hennepin Avenue Bridge
