= Boyd Huppert =

American journalist

- Born: January 22, 1962 (age 64); River Falls, Wisconsin, U.S.
- Education: University of Wisconsin–River Falls (1984)
- Occupations: Reporter; photojournalist; writer; television personality
- Employer: KARE 11
- Spouse: Sheri Heltne
- Children: 2

Boyd Huppert (born January 22, 1962) is an American journalist and television personality. He is a news reporter for KARE 11 in Minneapolis–Saint Paul, Minnesota. He is the lead writer, producer and host of KARE 11's Land of 10,000 Stories news segment, which has received numerous awards for photojournalism. Huppert has been recognized for his emotional storytelling ability in television news; Neal Justin of the Star Tribune described Huppert as "one of the most admired and celebrated TV reporters in the country."

== Early life and career ==
Huppert, a native of River Falls, Wisconsin, was born on January 22, 1962. He first began his career in journalism as an announcer for the radio station WEVR-FM at the age of 16. He graduated from University of Wisconsin–River Falls in 1984 with degrees in journalism and political science. He was named the university's 2013 Distinguished Alumnus for his contributions to broadcast journalism.

== Television work ==
Huppert first worked in television at WSAW-TV in Wausau, Wisconsin, beginning in 1984. He then worked at KETV and WITI before joining KARE 11 in 1996. Regarding Huppert's work in television news, film critic Duane Dudek said that Huppert's "curiosity and craftsmanship are unique, which explains why we don't see more of it." Huppert's Land of 10,000 Stories segment has been noted for its showcase of local heroes and stories of compassion, as well as his use of natural sounds in story production. Huppert often collaborates with photojournalists, Chad Nelson & Devin Krinke for his Land of 10,000 Stories segment.

Huppert has also worked as a journalism educator, holding writing workshops for broadcast journalism worldwide. In 2007, Huppert received a national News & Documentary Emmy Award for "Portrait of Compassion", a six-minute feature on a Utah-based artist who created portraits of deceased soldiers. The story ran on NBC's Today Show and CNN, leading to its nomination for a national Emmy and eventual win. Huppert has won 20 RTDNA Edward R. Murrow Awards, multiple National Headliner Grant Awards and Scripps Howard Awards, and 128 regional Emmy Awards.

== Personal life ==
Huppert is married to his wife Sheri Huppert (née Heltne), who works as a law librarian. The couple have two adult sons together, Sam and Matt Huppert.

In 2021, Huppert was diagnosed with multiple myeloma, an uncommon form of blood cancer. There is no cure for the cancer, though Huppert plans to undergo chemotherapy and a bone marrow transplant. His diagnosis was announced in an interview with KARE 11 anchor and long-time colleague Randy Shaver; the interview ran as a Land of 10,000 Stories segment on October 31, 2021.
