= Maryland Lottery =

Independent agency in Maryland, US

Maryland Lottery and Gaming Control Agency
- Company type: Lottery
- Industry: Gambling
- Founded: 1973
- Founder: Maryland government
- Headquarters: Baltimore, Maryland, United States
- Number of locations: Headquarters: Baltimore
- Area served: Maryland
- Key people: John Martin (Director); Jim Nielsen (Deputy Director); James Butler (Assistant Deputy Director/Chief of Staff); Holly Citko (Principal Counsel); James Logue (Managing Director of Gaming); John Mooney (Managing Director of Regulatory Enforcement); Paula Yocum (Chief Financial Officer); Carole Gentry (Managing Director of Communications)
- Products: Pick 3, Pick 4, Pick 5, scratch-offs, Keno, Racetrax, Bonus Match 5, Multi Match, Cash4Life, Mega Millions, Powerball
- Website: mdlottery.com mdgaming.com

The Maryland Lottery and Gaming Control Agency (MLGCA) is an independent agency of the Maryland government. The MLGCA operates the Maryland Lottery and serves as regulator for Maryland's casino and sports wagering programs and a number of ancillary gaming programs.

The Lottery offers 10 draw games, instant FAST PLAY games and instant scratch-off tickets. Daily drawings were once shown on Baltimore television station WBAL-TV. Maryland has six privately owned licensed casinos that each offer slot machines and table games. The MLGCA is headquartered in Suite 330 at 1800 Washington Boulevard, in Montgomery Business Park, Baltimore. The minimum age to buy Maryland Lottery tickets is 18, and casino patrons must be at least 21.

== History ==
In 1972, citizens of Maryland approved a constitutional amendment to begin a government-run lottery. The Maryland Lottery began on January 2, 1973. The Lottery opened its doors for the first time with 94 employees to handle operations, 3,800 sales agents to sell tickets and 51 banks to distribute tickets to agents and handle deposits. Approximately 60% of sales are returned to players, 30% is used for state-funded programs, 7% is used for commissions to retailers, and 3% is given to the Lottery for operating expenses. The first game Twin Win went on sale on May 15, 1973, and the first drawing was May 24, 1973. Scratch-offs, now the Lottery's best-selling game, became available on February 10, 1976. Pick 3 were introduced in July 1976. In April 1983, Pick 4 began. Keno, initially played only at Lottery retailers equipped with monitors, began in January 1993. (Keno expanded to Keno Bonus in 1999, and Keno Super Bonus in 2009). In September 1995, Maryland introduced Bonus Match 5. (It ended in 1998, but returned in 2002). In 1996, Maryland help launched The Big Game, which became Mega Millions in 2002. (Mega Millions now is offered by 44 lotteries). In March 2012, a Maryland player won a one-third share of the then largest jackpot in American history, $656 million. In November 2005, the Maryland Lottery signed an $81 million deal with Scientific Games. As a result, Racetrax began in August 2006. Racetrax a Tabcorp International product, is a thoroughbred horse racing game. Racetrax became Racetrax Bonus in August 2009. Maryland Lotto was replaced by Multi-Match in 2006. Maryland, as part of the January 2010 cross-sell expansion, joined Powerball. In January 2022, the Maryland lottery announced that the 5 card cash game would end on Sunday, February 6, 2022, replacing it with the pick 5 game. As of December 19, 2022, Maryland lottery drawings are conducted using a digital drawing system. Until December 18, 2022, Maryland lottery drawings were conducted using mechanical drawing machines that mix and select numbered balls. On May 6, 2024, the Maryland lottery introduced cash pop with 4 drawings each day.

In 2007, the Maryland government passed a bill allowing 15,000 video lottery terminals in five locations throughout Maryland. The following year, voters passed the referendum, Maryland's first casino opened in 2010. As of June 2012, video lottery terminals at the three casinos had generated over $297 million in revenue. Of that revenue, 49.25% is given to education, 33% is given back to the casino operators, 7% is used for horse racing purses, 5.5% is used for local impact grants, 2.5% is used to help renew the racetracks, 1.75% is given to the Lottery for operational expenses, and 1.5% is given to small businesses.

== Drawings ==
Drawing	Drawing days	WBAL broadcast
Pick 3/4/5 (Mid-day)	Daily	12:27 pm, M-F 12:28 pm, Sat-Sun
Pick 3/4/5 (Evening)	Daily	7:56 pm, M-Sat 8:22-8:30 pm, Sun
Cash Pop (Morning)	Daily	9 AM, M-Sun
Cash Pop (Midday)	Daily	1 PM, M-Sun
Cash Pop (Evening)	Daily	6 PM M-Sun
Cash Pop (Night)	Daily	11 PM M-Sun
Bonus Match 5	Daily	7:56 pm, M-Sat 8:22-8:30 pm, Sun
Multi-Match	Mon & Thur	11:22 pm
Mega Millions	Tues & Fri	11:22 pm
Cash4Life§	Daily	9pm‡
Powerball	Mon, Wed, & Sat	11:22 pm

§ Maryland joined the multi-state Cash4Life on January 26, 2016.

‡ Drawing takes place on Livestream.

== Gaming Control Commission ==
The Maryland Lottery and Gaming Control Commission (MLGCC) serves as an advisory board to the MLGCA. The commission is made up of seven members who are appointed to five-year terms by the Governor with the advice and consent of the Senate. In November 2008, the Commission assumed responsibility for regulating casino gaming in Maryland. In May 2021, with the enactment of the state's sports wagering law, the MLGCC also assumed responsibility for regulating sports wagering in Maryland.

Commission members:

- E. Randolph Marriner (chair)
- George L. Doetsch Jr. (Vice Chair)
- F. Vernon Boozer
- Michelle Fager
- Harold E. Hodges
- James J. Stakem
- Jerry E. Williams
