= Ken Barlow (harness racing) =

American harness horse driver

Kenneth Barlow
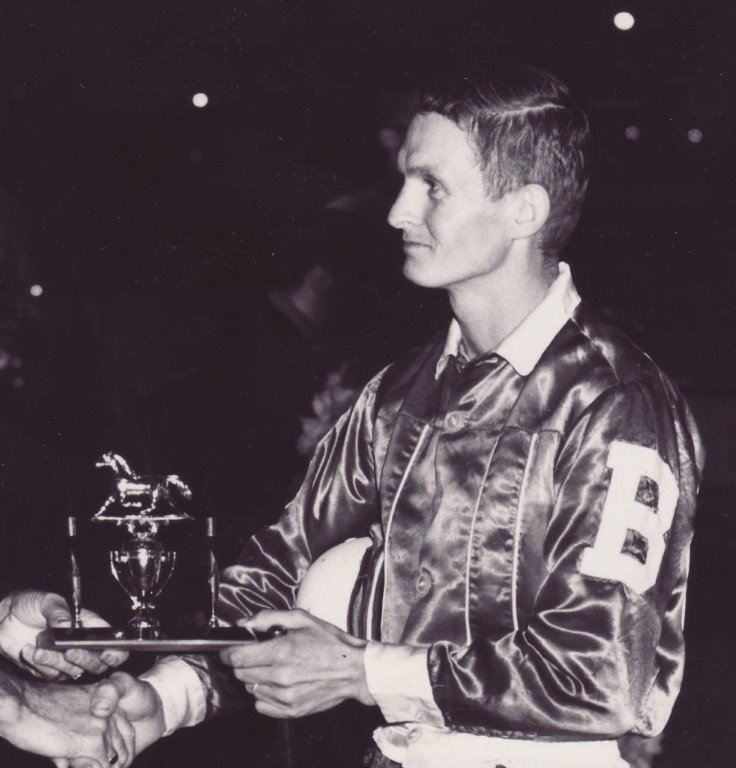
- Ken Barlow Harness Racing Award Recipient 1964
- Born: July 28, 1936 (age 89)
- Occupation: Harness Horse Driver

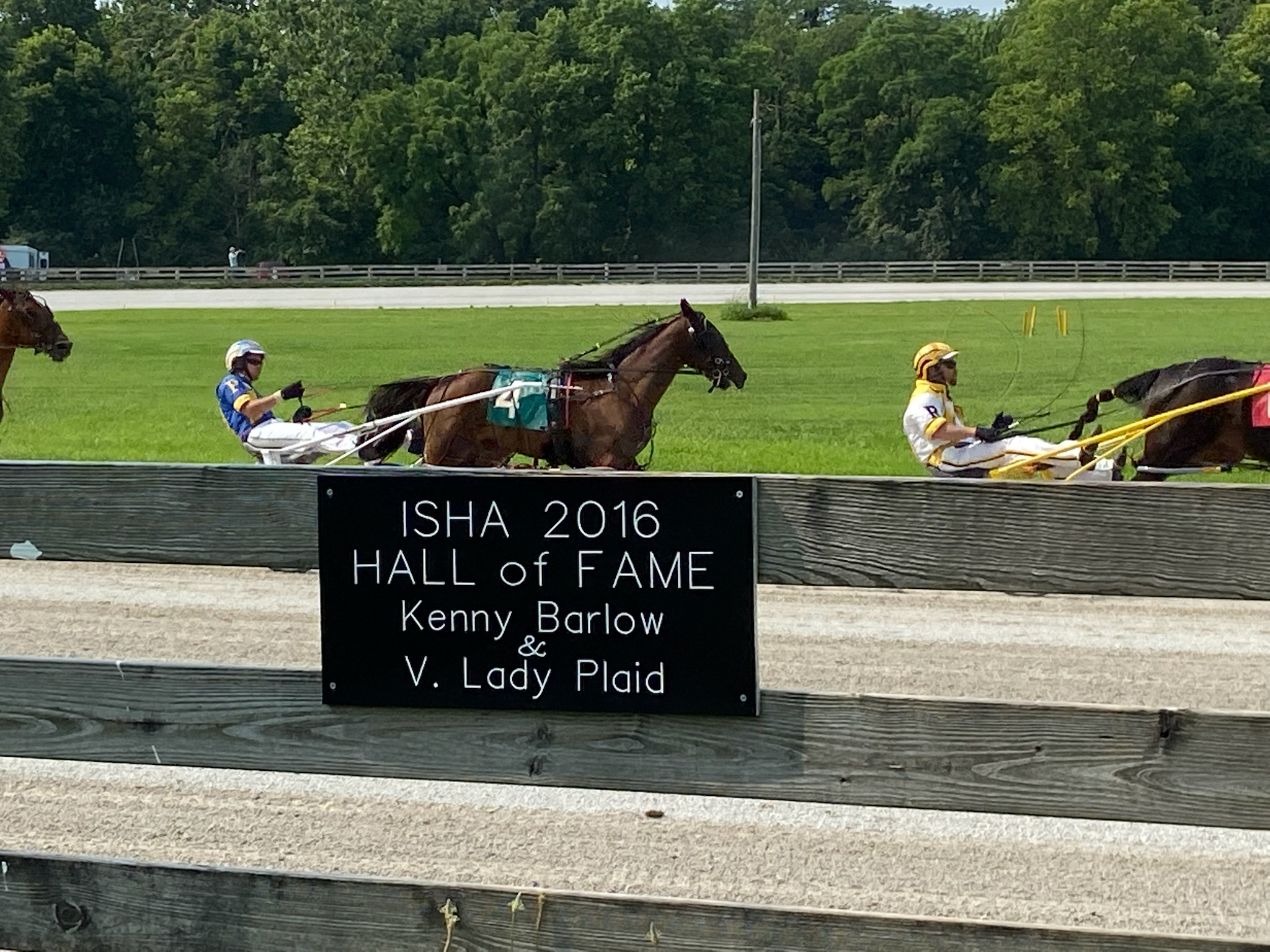
Hall of Fame plaque for Kenny Barlow and V. Lady Plaid

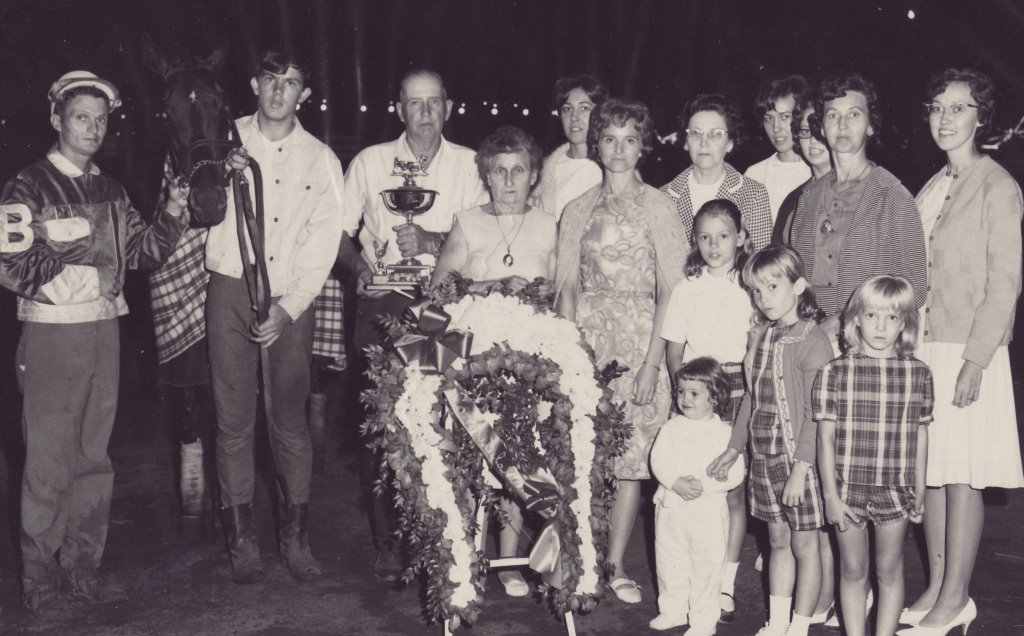
Ken Barlow and Virgnes Lady Plaid 1966

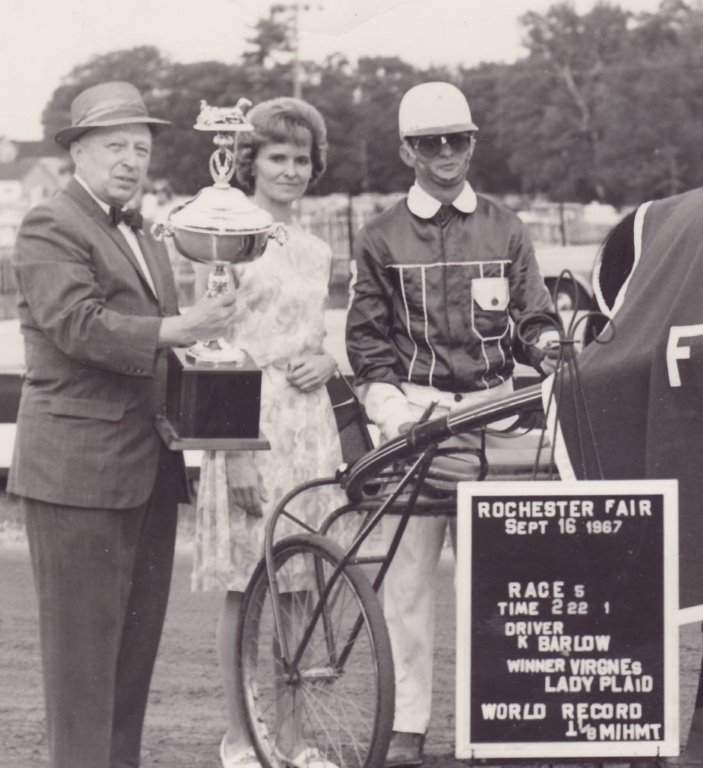
Ken Barlow - 1967 Harness Racing World Record

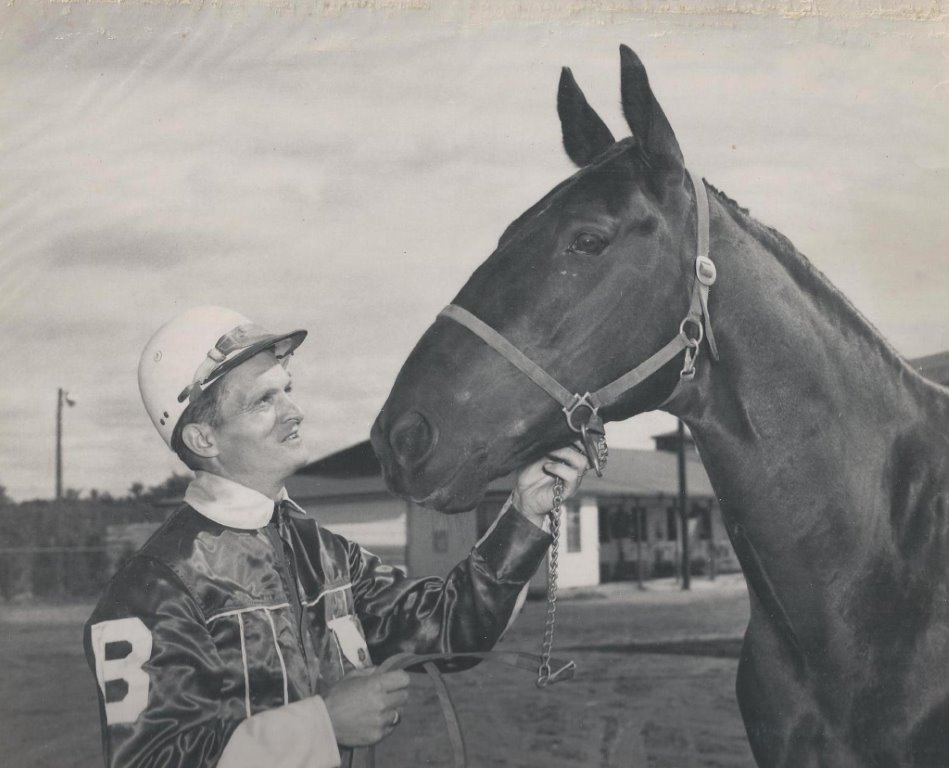
Ken Barlow 1967

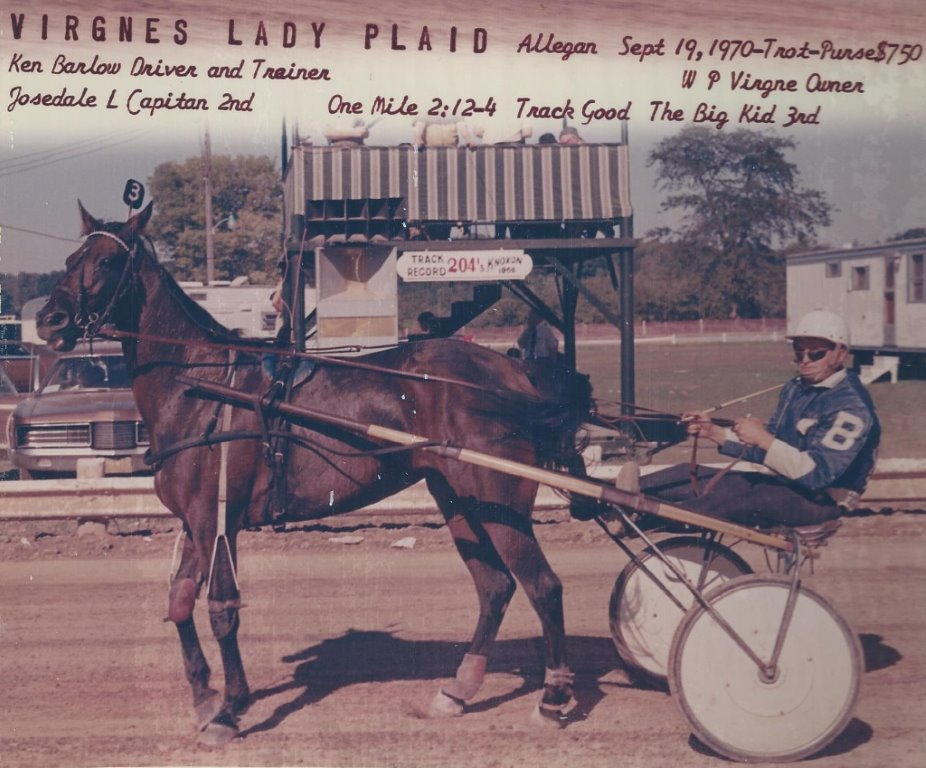
Ken Barlow and Virgnes Lady Plaid 1970

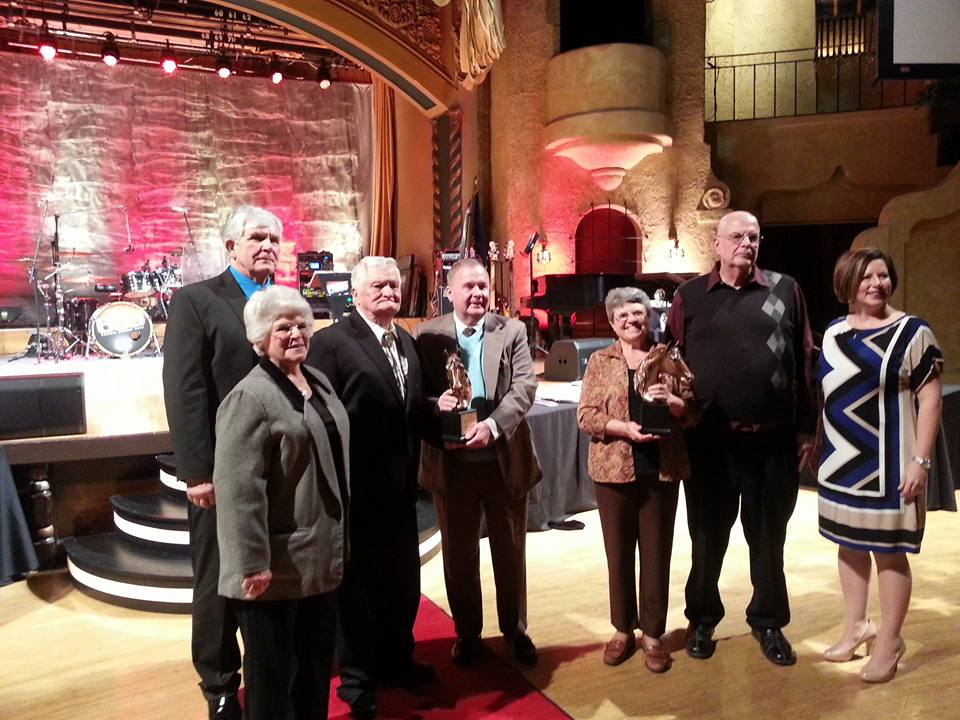
February, 6th 2016, Ken Barlow induction into Indiana Standardbred Association Hall Of Fame

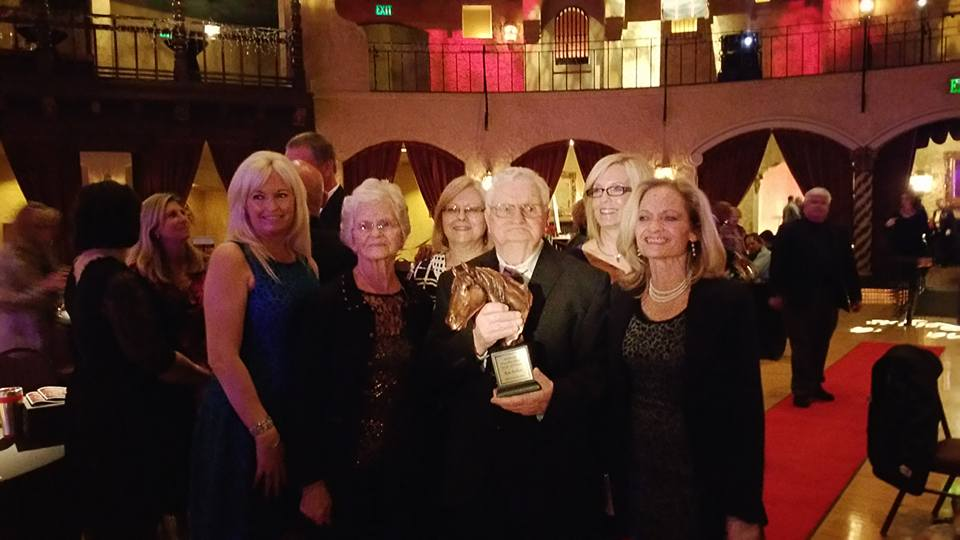
A Horse Family - Pictured here at the Indiana Standardbred Association Hall Of Fame Award Ceremony is Ken Barlow, wife Sharlene and four daughters who all played a part in Ken Barlow's distinguished Horse Harness Racing Career.

Kenneth D. Barlow (born July 28, 1936) professionally known as Ken Barlow, was an American Harness Horse Driver.

== Career ==
His professional career began in 1960 with a horse named Lucky Jim and he won his first race with a horse named Tommy Goose. Ken Barlow was a two time Champion and Winner of the “Indiana Harness Horse Driver of the Year” award in 1964 and 1965. He started racing a horse named Virgne’s Lady Plaid in 1965, who in 1966 won "Indiana's 3 year old Trotting Crown" by winning 13 straight victories and “Indiana Horse of the Year” with 21 out of 30 wins overall. That same year they tied for the “National Lead in Harness Horse Race Wins by a Trotter”and set the seasons record of 2:06.4 on a half mile track at Anderson Indiana. On April 19, 1968 Ken Barlow and Virgnes Lady Plaid set the season record at Saratoga Raceway of 2:05.1 and then lowered it to 2:04.3 on April 26 and then lowered it again to 2:03.4 on May 10, 1968.

On September 16, 1967 Ken Barlow and Virgnes Lady Plaid set a new World Harness Horse Racing Record of 2:25.1 for a mile and an eighth on a half mile track, the previous record had stood for 22 years. By 1968 the newspapers and Barlow's friends were calling him the "Hoosier Hop Shot" as he raced in Indiana then traveled by plane to race in New York the same night. In 1970 Ken Barlow was named the leading driver at Jackson Raceway in Michigan. He also broke colts for the Hanover Shoe Farms.

Ken Barlow's good friends and racing colleagues included George Sholty, Jimmy and John Simpson, Billy Haughton, Jay Sears, Billy Herman, Stanley Dancer, and Howard Bessinger among other highly respected drivers. Barlow raced his last race in 1989 with a horse named Racy Mark at the Meadowlands Racetrack in New Jersey.

During his 28-year career he raced 3,118 races, had 477 wins (1st Place), 390 seconds (2nd Place), and 366 thirds (3rd Place). Ken Barlow and Virgnes Lady Plaid have been inducted to the Indiana Standardbred Association Hall of Fame on February 6, 2016.

== Family ==
Ken Barlow married Sharlene Ryle on July 2, 1955, and they had four daughters Debbie, Dianne, Donna, and Darlene.
