= Ken Barlow (meteorologist) =

American television meteorologist

Kenneth John Barlow (born 1962) is an American television meteorologist currently with KSTP-TV in Minneapolis.

Barlow has a B.S. in meteorology from Plymouth State University.

From 1991 to 2006, Barlow worked at KARE-TV in Minneapolis. He then moved to Boston to become chief meteorologist at WBZ-TV. After four years with WBZ, Barlow joined KXTV in Sacramento, California in May 2010.

In 2011, Barlow returned to the Twin Cities and joined KSTP.

Ken has been awarded 4 Emmys through his career.

With the KSTP 5 Eyewitness News Morning team, Barlow won an Upper Midwest Emmy Award in 2016 for his role on the program that aired after the death of Prince.

Barlow was diagnosed with bipolar I disorder in 2007.

. Ken Barlow is a mental health advocate

Ken decided to share his story.He continues to talk about mental health and the importance of knowing that you are not alone in your mental health journey.

Ken Barlow recently received the 2026 Alumni Achievement Award from Plymouth State University—for his 42 year (and counting) meteorology career and his strong mental health advocacy over the years.

.
