= Mass media in Minneapolis–Saint Paul =

Minneapolis–Saint Paul, also known as the Twin Cities of Minneapolis and Saint Paul, in the state of Minnesota, has two major general-interest newspapers. The region is currently ranked as the 15th largest television market in the United States. The market officially includes 59 counties of Minnesota and Wisconsin, and extends far to the north and west. The radio market in the Twin Cities is estimated to be slightly smaller, ranked 16th in the nation.

== Print ==
The two major general-interest newspapers are the Star Tribune in Minneapolis and the Saint Paul Pioneer Press. Mpls.St.Paul Magazine covers arts and culture, shops, and the dining scene in the Twin Cities. The Minnesota Daily serves the University of Minnesota's Twin Cities campus and surrounding neighborhoods. The Minnesota Spokesman-Recorder, One Nation News and the Finance and Commerce business daily are published in Minneapolis, as is the Web-based MinnPost.com.

A number of other weekly and monthly publications (most of which are fully supported by advertising) are also available. The most prominent of these was Village Voice Media's City Pages, the alternative weekly which was sold to the Star Tribune in 2015 and ceased publication in 2020. 2002 newcomer The Rake offered some competition in the form of a free monthly, but ceased publication in 2008.) Pulse of the Twin Cities (1997–2007) was another weekly which had less advertising and more coverage of local music and activism. La Matraca News is a Spanish-language weekly print and online publication.

There are also numerous weekly student publications at area colleges, including the University of Minnesota's The Wake student magazine, Macalester College's The Mac Weekly, and St. Thomas' TommieMedia.com, which replaced student newspaper The Aquin that was shuttered in 2009.

Minneapolis community newspapers include the sister publications Downtown Journal, formerly Skyway News, and Southwest Journal, which cover downtown and southwest Minneapolis, respectively, as well as numerous neighborhood papers such as the North News, Seward Profile, Southside Pride, and Whittier Globe.

Only one weekly newspaper is devoted to neighborhood news in either city: St. Paul's East Side Review. Saint Paul also has a monthly, Highland Villager, and a bi-monthly neighborhood newspaper for Frogtown, Greening Frogtown.

Instead of neighborhood or general-interest news, some periodicals are topical, such as those covering the Minnesota music scene. Others are audience-specific, such as Lavender Magazine for the state's gay community. The Minnesota Women's Press, one of the few feminist newspapers in the country, serves the local feminist community. Another periodical of note is the Asian American Press.

=== List of newspapers and magazines ===
The following is a list of print and online publications in the Minneapolis–St. Paul metropolitan area:

==== Daily ====
- Finance and Commerce (Minneapolis)
- St. Paul Pioneer Press (St. Paul)
- Star Tribune (Minneapolis)

==== Weekly ====
- Minneapolis/St. Paul Business Journal (Minneapolis)
- Minnesota Spokesman-Recorder (Minneapolis)
- La Matraca News (Spanish/Latino newspaper)
- One Nation News

==== College ====
- The Echo (Augsburg University student newspaper)
- The Mac Weekly (Macalester College student newspaper)
- The Minnesota Daily (University of Minnesota student newspaper)
- TommieMedia (University of St. Thomas student news website)
- The Wake (University of Minnesota student magazine)
- The Clarion (Bethel University student newspaper and magazine)
- The Oracle (Hamline University student newspaper)
- The Metropolitan (Metro State University student newspaper)

==== Online ====
- Axios Twin Cities
- MinnPost
- Minnesota Reformer
- Patch.com
- Racket
- Sahan Journal

==== Other ====
- Bring Me The News
- CCX Media
- DUNation
- Game Informer
- Minnesota Monthly
- Mpls.St.Paul Magazine
- Twin Cities Arts Reader

==== Neighborhood press ====
In Minneapolis:

- Bryn Mawr Bugle, published monthly
- Camden Community News, published monthly
- Longfellow Nokomis Messenger, published monthly
- North News, published monthly
- Northeast Beat, online only
- Northeaster, published bimonthly
- Seward Profile, published monthly
- Southside Pride, published monthly
- Whittier Globe, published monthly

In St. Paul:

- East Side Review, published weekly
- Midway-Como-North End Monitor, published monthly
- Park Bugle, published monthly
- Villager, published twice-monthly
- West Seventh Community Reporter, published monthly

==== Special interest ====
- Asian American Press
- La Matraca News in Spanish for Minnesota's Latino community
- Catholic Spirit
- Lavender Magazine, for Minnesota's LGBT community
- Minnesota Women's Press, feminist newspaper
- Profane Existence, the world's largest circulating anarcho-punk magazine
- Whistling Shade, a Twin Cities literary journal

== Radio ==
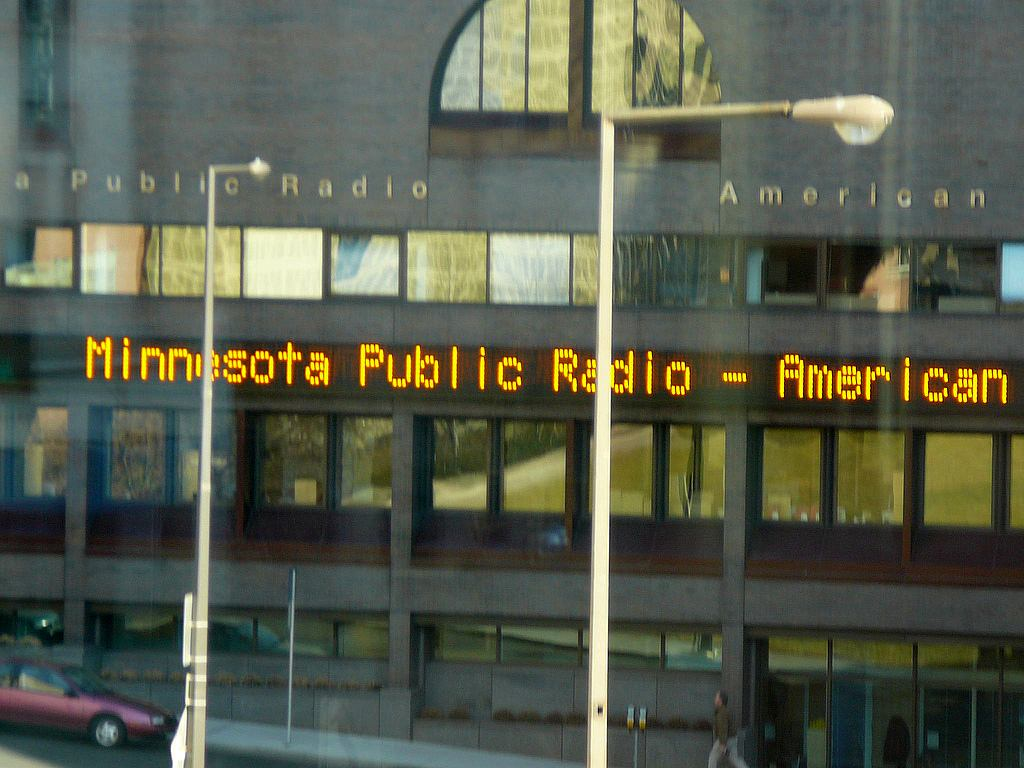
Minnesota Public Radio, St. Paul

Most of the major TV and radio transmitters are located in Shoreview, Minnesota, and backup facilities for some are maintained atop the IDS Center in downtown Minneapolis (though a few low-power broadcasters use the IDS as their primary transmitter location).

=== List of radio stations ===
==== AM stations ====
- 630 WREY Saint Paul (Regional Mexican)
- 690 KFXN Minneapolis (Hmong)
- 740 WDGY Hudson, WI (Oldies)
- 770 KUOM Minneapolis (College/University of Minnesota Twin Cities)
- 830 WCCO Minneapolis (News/talk)
- 900 KTIS Minneapolis (Christian)
- 950 KTNF St. Louis Park (Progressive talk)
- 1030 WCTS Maplewood (Christian)
- 1130 KTLK Minneapolis (Conservative talk)
- 1280 WWTC Minneapolis (Conservative talk)
- 1330 WLOL Minneapolis (Catholic/Relevant Radio)
- 1400 KMNV Saint Paul (Regional Mexican)
- 1440 KYCR Golden Valley (Business news)
- 1470 KMNQ Brooklyn Park (Regional Mexican)
- 1500 KSTP Saint Paul (Sports/ESPN)
- 1570 KDIZ Golden Valley (Conservative talk)
- 1590 WIXK New Richmond, WI (Hmong)

==== FM stations ====
- 88.5 KBEM-FM Minneapolis (Jazz)
- 89.3 KCMP Northfield (Adult album alternative)
- 89.9 KMOJ Minneapolis (Urban contemporary/talk)
- 90.3 KFAI Minneapolis (Eclectic/Free-form/talk)
- 91.1 KNOW-FM Saint Paul (NPR/News/talk/MPR)
- 91.7 WMCN Saint Paul (College/Macalester College)
- 92.5 KQRS-FM Golden Valley (Classic rock)
- 93.7 KXXR Minneapolis (Active rock)
- 94.5 KSTP-FM Saint Paul (Hot AC)
- 95.3 KNOF Saint Paul (Contemporary worship music)
- 95.9 WLKX-FM Forest Lake (Classic country)
- 96.3 KMWA Edina (Air1)
- 97.1 KTCZ-FM Minneapolis (Modern AC)
- 98.5 KTIS-FM Minneapolis (Contemporary Christian)
- 99.5 KSJN Minneapolis (NPR/Classical/MPR)
- 100.3 KFXN-FM Minneapolis (Sports/FSR)
- 101.3 KDWB-FM Richfield (CHR)
- 102.1 KEEY-FM Saint Paul (Country)
- 102.9 KMNB Minneapolis (Country)
- 104.1 KZJK St. Louis Park (Adult hits/Jack FM)
- 105.1 WGVX Lakeville (Soft AC/oldies/WWWM-FM simulcast)
- 105.3 WLUP Cambridge (Soft AC/oldies/WWWM-FM simulcast)
- 105.7 WWWM-FM Eden Prairie (Soft AC/oldies)
- 106.1 KLCI Elk River (Classic country)
- 106.5 KUOM-FM St. Louis Park (College/University of Minnesota Twin Cities/KUOM simulcast)
- 107.1 KTMY Coon Rapids (Female-oriented talk)
- 107.9 KQQL Anoka (Classic hits)

==== Low-power FM stations and translators ====
- 91.5 K218DK Bloomington (Christian/Moody Radio)
- 92.1 W221BS Saint Paul (Oldies/WDGY simulcast)
- 92.9 W225AP Saint Paul (Christian hip-hop/KMWA-HD2 simulcast)
- 93.3 W227BF Shoreview (Black news/talk/BIN/KQQL-HD2 simulcast)
- 94.1 WFNU-LP Saint Paul (Community)
- 95.7 K239CJ Saint Paul (Regional Mexican)
- 96.7 K244FE Calhoun Beach (Sports/KQQL-HD3 simulcast)
- 97.5 KPPS-LP Saint Paul (Community)
- 97.5 W248CU Minneapolis (Christian radio/KTIS simulcast)
- 97.9 K250BY Maplewood (Christian/WCTS simulcast)
- 97.9 KEFE-LP Lakeville (Spanish Christian)
- 98.1 KENL-LP Saint Paul (Christian)
- 98.9 KRSM-LP Minneapolis (Community)
- 99.1 WVIC-LP Saint Paul (Community)
- 99.9 K260BA Coon Rapids (K-LOVE)
- 100.7 W264BR Falcon Heights (College/University of Minnesota Twin Cities/KUOM simulcast)
- 101.7 KALY-LP Minneapolis (Community)
- 102.5 K273BH Fridley (K-LOVE)
- 103.5 K278BP Cottage Grove (Conservative talk/KTLK simulcast)
- 104.5 K283BG Minneapolis (College/University of Minnesota Twin Cities/KUOM simulcast)
- 104.7 WEQY-LP Saint Paul (Community)
- 105.3 K287CH Minnetonka (Catholic/Relevant Radio/WLOL simulcast)
- 105.5 K288GR Bayport (Regional Mexican/WREY simulcast)
- 106.7 K294AM West Saint Paul (Hmong/WIXK simulcast)
- 107.5 K298CO Minneapolis (Conservative talk/WWTC simulcast)

== Television ==
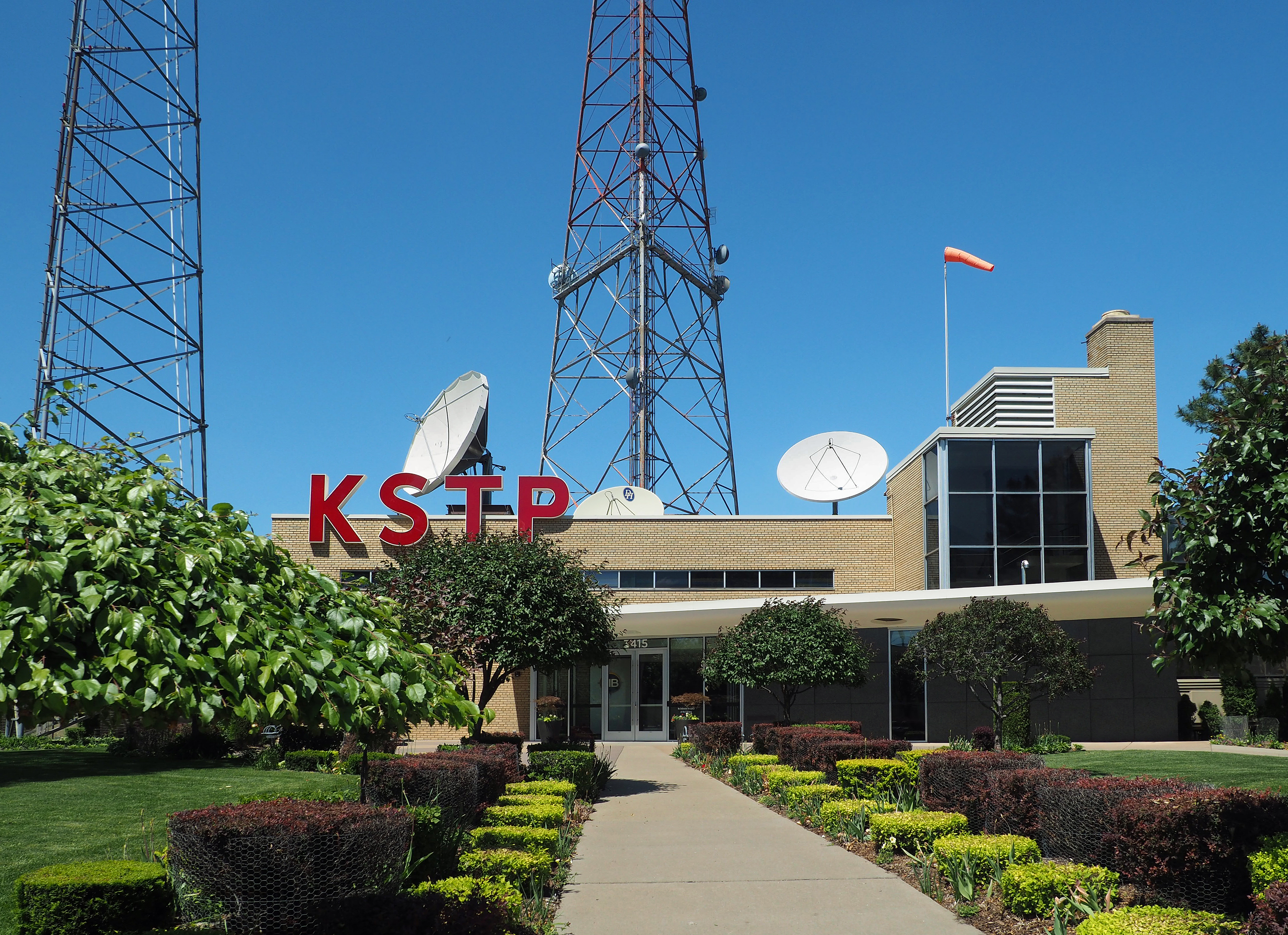
KSTP-TV

Two major television stations in the Twin Cities have main studios located in downtown Minneapolis. WCCO-TV, a CBS owned-and-operated station, broadcasts from studios along Nicollet Mall, and WUCW, the local CW affiliate owned by Sinclair Broadcast Group, broadcasts from the Pence Automobile Company Building. Four other stations maintain studios in St. Paul. Twin Cities Public Television operates both of the Twin Cities' PBS member stations, KTCA and KTCI, and ABC affiliate KSTP-TV and independent station KSTC-TV are owned by Hubbard Broadcasting.

Three other stations serve the Twin Cities from studios in suburban areas. Fox O&O KMSP-TV and MyNetworkTV O&O WFTC are co-owned by Fox Television Stations, with studios located in Eden Prairie. KARE is the NBC affiliate in the Twin Cities, owned by Tegna and based in Golden Valley.

For much of the last two decades, KARE had the most popular evening newscasts. Since around 2010, however, WCCO has become the most watched station in the market in nearly all time slots. On the other end, KSTP has struggled to maintain ratings on its news programs. KMSP has had a 9 p.m. newscast since at least the early 1990s when it was a UPN affiliate.

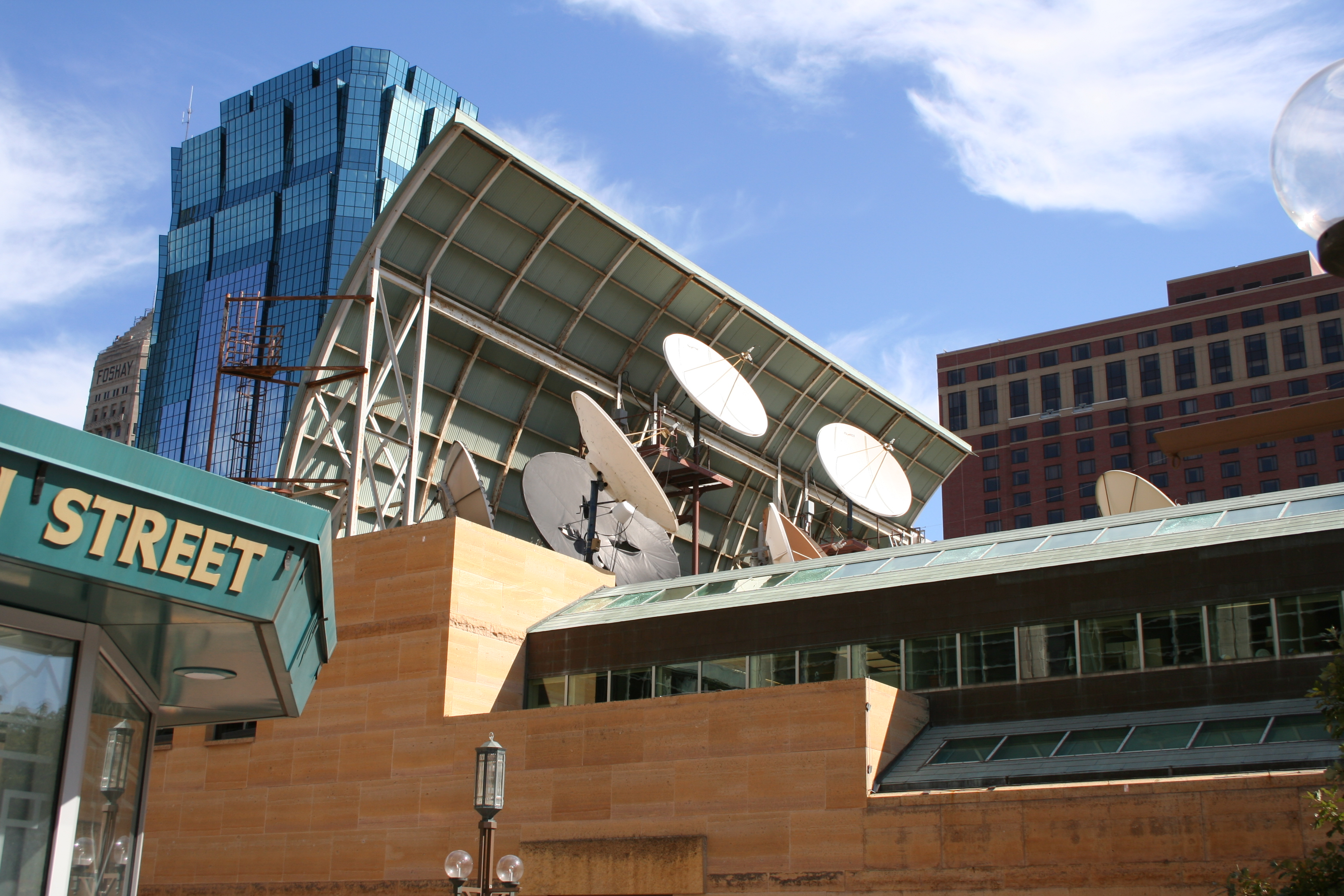
WCCO-TV satellite dishes Minneapolis

KSTP claims to have been the first station in the country to run a regular nightly newscast. It is the oldest station in the state to still be operating, having first gone on the air in 1948. TV broadcasts first occurred more than a decade earlier during the 1930s when engineers for radio station WDGY (now KFAN) experimented with a mechanical television system. Mechanical TV quickly lost favor, and the station's owner decided to let the license expire in 1938.

Communities in the region have their own Public, educational, and government access (PEG) cable TV channels. One channel, the Metro Cable Network, is available on channel 6 on cable systems across the seven-county region. Minneapolis Telecommunications Network (MTN) has three public-access television cable TV channels and Saint Paul Neighborhood Network (SPNN) has two.

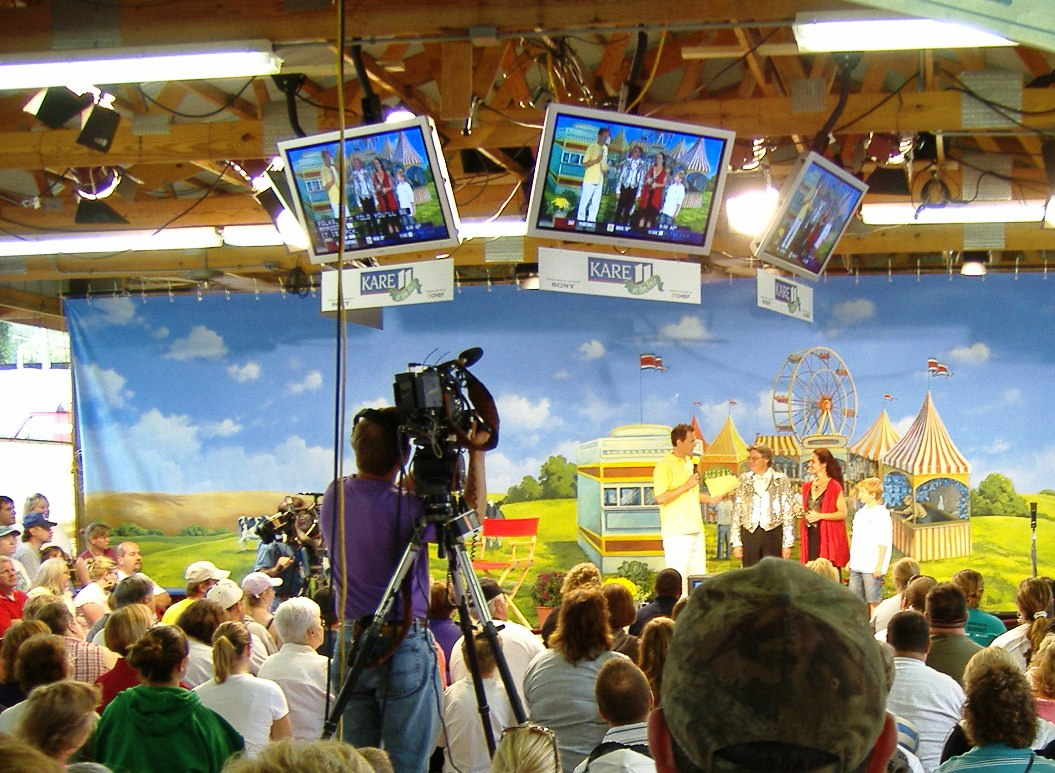
KARE television broadcast, Minnesota State Fair

Area residents of the right age look back fondly on many of the locally produced shows that were on the air for about two decades, from the early days of TV in Minnesota up until the 1970s. WCCO, KSTP, KMSP, and WTCN (now KARE) all had children's shows, though there were a few other notable shows targeting an older audience.

Several television programs originating in the Twin Cities have been aired nationally on terrestrial and cable TV networks. KTCA created the science program Newton's Apple and distributes a children's program today. A few unusual comedic shows also originated in the area. In the 1980s, KTMA (now WUCW) created a number of low-budget shows, including the cult classic Mystery Science Theater 3000 (which later aired on The Comedy Channel/Comedy Central from 1989 to 1996 and the Sci-Fi Channel from 1997 to 2004). The short-lived Let's Bowl (which aired on Comedy Central) started on KARE, and the PBS series Mental Engineering originated on the St. Paul public-access television network.

Two episodes of Route 66 were made in Minneapolis in the 1960s. The 1970s CBS situation comedy set in Minneapolis, The Mary Tyler Moore Show, won three Golden Globes and 29 Emmy Awards. The show's opening sequences were filmed in the city.

=== List of television stations ===
This is a list of television stations in the Minneapolis–Saint Paul area.

==== Full-power ====
- 2 KTCA-TV Saint Paul (TPT/PBS)
- 2.3 KTCI-TV Saint Paul (TPT Life)
- 4 WCCO-TV Minneapolis (CBS)
- 5 KSTP-TV Saint Paul (ABC)
- 5.2 KSTC-TV Minneapolis (Independent)
- 9 KMSP-TV Minneapolis (Fox)
- 9.2 WFTC Minneapolis (Independent with MyNetworkTV)
- 23 WUCW Minneapolis (The CW)
- 41 KPXM-TV St. Cloud (Ion Television)

==== Low-power ====
- 14 K14RB-D Saint Paul (Local programming, EWTN on 14.2)
- 15 KWJM-LD Minneapolis
- 17 KMWE-LD Saint Paul (Telemundo, TeleXitos on 17.2)
- 19 KKTW-LD Minneapolis
- 21 WUMN-LD Minneapolis (Univision)
- 25 KJNK-LD Minneapolis
- 33 K33LN-D Minneapolis
- 38 K28PQ-D St. Cloud
- 43 KMBD-LD Minneapolis
- 49 KMQV-LD Rochester
- 62 WDMI-LD Minneapolis (Daystar)

==== Cable ====
- Metro Cable Network (cable channel 6)
- Minneapolis Telecommunications Network (MTN)
- Spectrum News 1 Wisconsin (on Spectrum systems on Wisconsin side of market)

== Movies ==
Movies filmed in Minneapolis include Airport (1970), The Heartbreak Kid (1972), Slaughterhouse-Five (1972), Ice Castles (1978), Foolin' Around (1980), Take This Job and Shove It (1981), Purple Rain (1984), That Was Then, This Is Now (1985), The Mighty Ducks (1992), Untamed Heart (1993), Little Big League (1994), Beautiful Girls (1996), Jingle All the Way (1996), Fargo (1996), and Young Adult (2011).
