= KALY-LP =

- Minneapolis, Minnesota; United States
- Frequency: 101.7 MHz

Programming
- Format: Somali music

Ownership
- Owner: Somali American Community

History
- First air date: September 24, 2015

Technical information
- Licensing authority: FCC
- Facility ID: 196857
- Class: L1
- Power: 100 Watts
- HAAT: 17.92 m (59 ft)
- Transmitter coordinates: 44°56′53″N 93°16′25.8″W

Links
- Public license information: LMS
- Website: kalyradio.org

KALY-LP (101.7 FM) is a low-power broadcast radio station licensed to Minneapolis, Minnesota. The station broadcasts from a tower in the Phillips West neighborhood of Minneapolis, near I-35W, shared with KRSM-LP.

== History ==
The station signed on September 24, 2015, with the primary audience intended to be Minnesota's Somali-American population. It was one of several LPFM stations to sign on in Minnesota in 2015. The others included WEQY-LP in St. Paul, and the early stages of WFNU-LP, also in St. Paul. KALY's mission was to bridge the gap between those who spoke English, and those who spoke Somali. The station worked with KFAI to help train volunteers.

The station also received assistance from the Prometheus Radio Project, based in Philadelphia. It was among over a thousand LPFMs to sign on thanks to the FCC's new class of stations.

The station was the first in the United States to broadcast programming of its type 24 hours a day, seven days a week. 3,000 people were surveyed before the station came to air, regarding their preferences for a radio station. KALY's 7 miles (11 km) to 10 miles (16 km) range affords it a potential listenership of 200,000 people. It is likely the station can be heard beyond that, due to the line of sight nature of FM broadcasting. Because the station streams, it has listeners around the world.

KALY is not the only station in Minnesota that caters to the Somali-American population. KZYS-LP in St. Cloud also features programming directed toward the Somalian population there.
