= KYCR =

KYCR may refer to:

- KYCR (AM), a radio station (1440 AM) licensed to Golden Valley, Minnesota, United States
- KDIZ (AM), a radio station (1570 AM) licensed to Golden Valley, Minnesota, United States, which used the call sign KYCR from 1988 to 2015
