= KDIZ =

KDIZ may refer to:

- KDIZ (AM), a radio station (1570 AM) licensed to Golden Valley, Minnesota, United States
- KYCR (AM), a radio station (1440 AM) licensed to Golden Valley, Minnesota, United States, which used the call sign KDIZ from 1996 to 2015
