= KASM =

Radio station in Albany, Minnesota

- Albany, Minnesota; United States
- Frequency: 1150 kHz (HD Radio via KDDG-HD2)
- Branding: 1150 AM KASM

Programming
- Format: News/Talk

Ownership
- Owner: Lucas Carpenter; (Crystal Media Group, LLC)
- Sister stations: KDDG, WQPM, KLCI, WLKX, KBGY

History
- First air date: November 20, 1950

Technical information
- Licensing authority: FCC
- Facility ID: 33464
- Class: D
- Power: 2,100 watts (day); 21 watts (night)
- Transmitter coordinates: 45°37′53″N 94°36′0″W
- Translator: 107.7 K299BT (Albany)

Links
- Public license information: Public file; LMS
- Webcast: Listen Live
- Website: www.mykasm.com

KASM (1150 AM) is a radio station licensed to serve Albany, Minnesota, United States. The station, established in 1950, is currently owned by Lucas Carpenter, through licensee Crystal Media Group, LLC.

KASM broadcasts a news-talk radio format. It receives reports from Brownfield Ag News network and the Minnesota Farm Network. It also carries Albany High School Huskies boys' and girls' athletics, including football, basketball, and hockey.

== History ==
KASM is a "heritage" radio station that officially signed on the air on November 20, 1950, licensed to Albany, Minnesota. For several decades, the station was owned and operated by the Wester family. However, in 2023, the station was acquired by Crystal Media Group, LLC, led by Lucas Carpenter. A central figure in KASM's history was Cliff Mitchell, who served as the station's Farm Director for 50 years, beginning in 1952. Mitchell was legendary for his 2:00 a.m. wake-up calls and his presence on programs like the "Dairyland Quiz" and "Party Line." His work helped KASM develop its unique identity as "The Dependable Neighbor."
