= KUXL =

KUXL may refer to:

- KRWD, a radio station (93.3 FM) licensed to serve Muleshoe, Texas, United States, which held the call sign KUXL from 2022 to 2023; see List of radio stations in Texas
- KDIZ (AM), a radio station (1570 AM) licensed to serve Golden Valley, Minnesota, United States, which held the call sign KUXL from 1961 to 1988
