= WZBY (FM) =

Radio station in Grand Portage, Minnesota

Coordinates: 47°58′40″N 89°41′05″W

- Grand Portage, Minnesota; United States
- Broadcast area: Far northeastern Minnesota
- Frequency: 92.7 MHz

Ownership
- Owner: Lucas and Dennis Carpenter; (Carpenter Broadcasting LLC)

History
- First air date: Summer 2021

Technical information
- Licensing authority: FCC
- Facility ID: 191572
- Class: A
- ERP: 100 watts
- HAAT: 197 meters (646 ft)

Links
- Public license information: Public file; LMS

WZBY is a radio station licensed to Grand Portage, Minnesota, broadcasting on 92.7 MHz FM. The station serves the far northeastern tip of Minnesota along Lake Superior, and is owned by Lucas and Dennis Carpenter, through licensee Carpenter Broadcasting LLC.

== History ==
The station was co-owned with WOTO, which signed on at the same time. The license for WOTO was returned to the FCC. Multi-Cultural Diversity Radio, Inc. also owned stations in the Twin Cities, including KLCI, and WLKX. The station could potentially upgrade to class C, which is the highest power class available for a radio station. The potential 100,000 watt signal would allow coverage into Thunder Bay in Canada, and along the North Shore of Lake Superior. It was one of two newer radio stations operated by the same group.
