= KDDG =

Coordinates: 45.631°N 94.600°W

Simulcasting KLCI Elk River
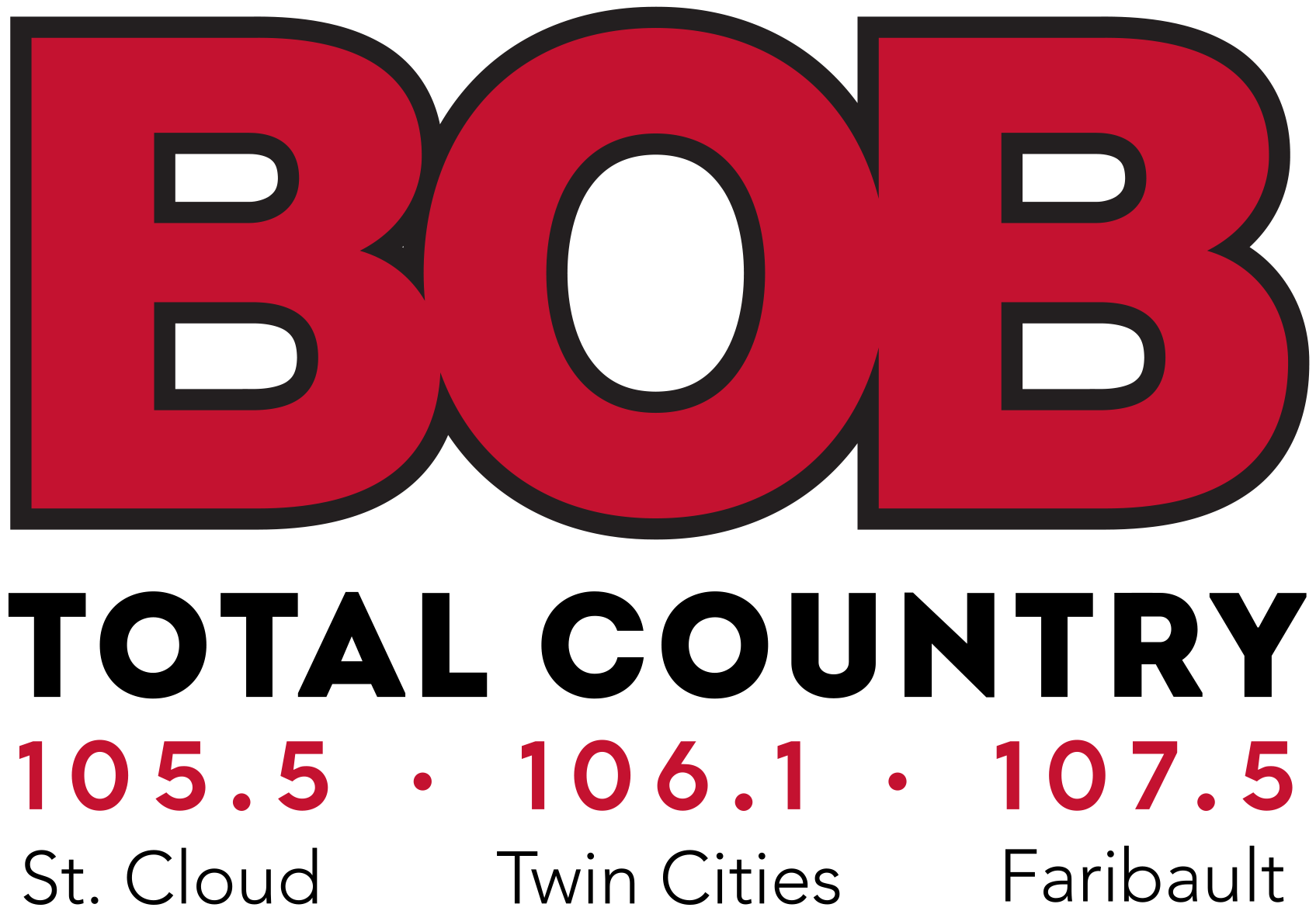
- Albany, Minnesota; United States
- Broadcast area: St. Cloud, Minnesota
- Frequency: 105.5 MHz (HD Radio)
- Branding: BOB Total Country

Programming
- Format: Classic country
- Subchannels: HD2: KASM simulcast (News/Talk); HD3: KLCI-HD3 simulcast (Oldies)
- Affiliations: Compass Media Networks; Westwood One; Minnesota Lynx

Ownership
- Owner: Lucas Carpenter; (Crystal Media Group, LLC)
- Sister stations: KLCI, WQPM, WLKX-FM, KASM, KBGY

History
- First air date: February 1994

Technical information
- Licensing authority: FCC
- Facility ID: 33463
- Class: A
- ERP: 6,000 watts
- HAAT: 100 meters (330 ft)

Links
- Public license information: Public file; LMS
- Webcast: Listen Live; Listen Live (HD3)
- Website: mybobcountry.com HD3: bigqradio.com

KDDG (105.5 FM, "BOB-FM") is a commercial radio station in St. Cloud, Minnesota, airing a classic country music format. The station is owned by Lucas Carpenter, through licensee Crystal Media Group, LLC, along with sister station KASM.

== History ==
KDDG officially signed on in February 1994. The station was established by StarCom (under Milestone Radio LLC), led by Dennis and Lucas Carpenter, to serve the western expansion of the St. Cloud market. In its early years, the station aired a satellite-fed Alternative Rock format branded as "105.5 The Edge." Following the rock format, the station flipped to an Oldies format, branding itself as "Fun Lovin' 105.5." In March 2006, the station transitioned to its current Classic Country format, becoming a primary simulcast partner for KLCI 106.1 ("BOB 106") in Elk River. This move allowed the "BOB FM" brand to reach listeners from the Twin Cities northwestern suburbs through the St. Cloud metropolitan area and into Alexandria.

The KDDG call sign was previously used for KRBI-FM in Mankato, Minnesota.

Former logo
