= KQRS =

KQRS may refer to:

- KQRS-FM, a radio station (92.5 FM) licensed to Golden Valley, Minnesota, United States
- KYCR (AM), a radio station (1440 AM) licensed to Golden Valley, Minnesota, United States, which used the call sign KQRS until November 1982 and from March 1984 to November 1996
