= KKMS (AM) =

Coordinates: 44°47′18″N 93°12′54″W

- Richfield, Minnesota; United States
- Broadcast area: Minneapolis-St. Paul
- Frequency: 980 kHz
- Branding: AM 980 The Mission

Programming
- Format: Christian talk and teaching
- Affiliations: Salem Radio Network; SRN News

Ownership
- Owner: Salem Media Group; (Salem Communications Holding Corporation)
- Sister stations: KDIZ, KYCR, WWTC

History
- First air date: October 18, 1949 (as WPBC)
- Former call signs: WPBC (1949–1972); WYOO (1972–1976); WAYL (1976–1982); KKSS (1982–1984); KMFY (1984–1988); WAYL (1988–1990); KMZZ (1990–1993); KRXX (1993–1994); KEGE (1994–1996)
- Call sign meaning: Minneapolis-St. Paul

Technical information
- Licensing authority: FCC
- Facility ID: 18518
- Class: B
- Power: 5,000 watts

Links
- Public license information: Public file; LMS
- Webcast: Listen Live!
- Website: am980themission.com

KKMS (980 kHz "The Mission") is a commercial AM radio station licensed to Richfield, Minnesota, and serving the Minneapolis-St. Paul radio market. It is owned by the Salem Media Group and broadcasts a Christian talk and teaching radio format. The transmitter and radio studios are on Cliff Road near Minnesota State Highway 77 in Eagan.

The station uses a brokered programming system, where national and local religious leaders buy time on the station and may use their programs to seek donations to their ministries. Some national hosts on KKMS include John MacArthur, Alistair Begg, David Jeremiah, J. Vernon McGee, June Hunt and Jim Daly. Several Salem Radio Network conservative talk hosts are also heard on the station, Eric Metaxas, Jay Sekulow and Charlie Kirk. The station produces a local afternoon show, "Crosswalk with Lee Michaels."

== History ==
=== WPBC ===
The People's Broadcasting Company, founded by former WCCO announcer Bill Stewart and his wife Becky Ann, obtained a construction permit for a new radio station at 980 kHz in Minneapolis on May 18, 1949. It signed on five months later on October 18. An independent station, WPBC played a variety of middle-of-the-road pop music and standards, and was even considered an innovator in the concept of singing jingles. To protect other stations on 980 AM from interference, WPBC was a daytimer, required to go off the air at night.

The Stewarts took a rather conservative approach in programming the station. They shied away from performers such as Elvis Presley and most early rock and roll music, which they described as "junky music with morally degrading lyrics." Their philosophy extended to commercials as well, to the point that they rejected advertising from beer and tobacco companies. Allegedly, the Stewarts would go so far as to use the sharp end of a compass to scratch away the grooves of tracks on albums that didn't meet their standards of "nice" music, in order to prevent rebellious DJs from playing them.

The daytime-only station expanded to FM when WPBC-FM 101.3 began simulcasting 980 AM on July 18, 1960. The FM station was able to continue WPBC's programming into the night while the AM stations was silent. Four years later, the Stewarts were approved to move both stations from Minneapolis to Richfield, increase the AM's power to 5 kW, and begin broadcasting at night using a directional antenna.

In 1969, the AM and FM stopped simulcasting. The FM retained the "good music" format, while the AM shifted even further to adult standards.

=== WYOO ===
The Stewarts, citing increased competition from larger companies, sold WPBC-AM-FM in 1972 to Fairchild Industries for $1.5 million. Fairchild subsequently dismissed the entire staff and overhauled both stations. On November 3, 1972, WPBC became WYOO, airing an oldies format, while WPBC-FM went off the air for technical adjustments, to emerge as album-oriented rock station WRAH. One unusual program feature was newscasts that consisted of four and a half minutes of sports and a handful of news headlines—the opposite of most radio newscasts.

After debuting to middling ratings that later declined, WYOO went in a new direction in April 1974, spearheaded by new general manager Mike Sigelman, the former sales manager of Top 40 outlet KDWB. A shift to an adult contemporary format was met with even lower ratings. Management saw a gap for a Top 40 station on FM, so both stations flipped on August 26, 1974. The change occurred during the Minnesota State Fair. The programmers wanted to call the station "Y100”, but WHYI in Miami, which also used the “Y100” moniker, sent the station a cease and desist order. As a result, WYOO became "U100", and quickly turned into a competitive station in the market.

=== WAYL and the Entercom years ===
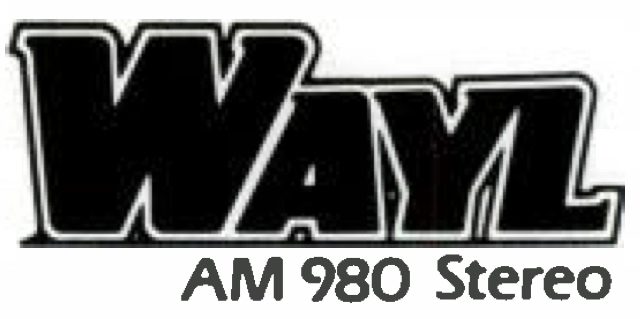
WAYL logo as it appeared in 1989

In early 1976, Fairchild Industries decided to put both stations up for sale, and the pair were broken up. In February, the owners of KDWB (630 AM) purchased the FM facility for $850,000. The AM station was then sold for $625,000 to Entertainment Communications, Inc. (which later became Entercom, now Audacy), owners of beautiful music/easy listening outlet WAYL (93.7 FM). It was WAYL's interest in the AM frequency—sewn up first, but announced second—that led to a search for a buyer for the FM facility. WYOO-FM became KDWB-FM on September 16, 1976, and WYOO (AM) became WAYL on September 20.

WAYL (whose mascot was a whale) simulcasted easy listening music on both 93.7 FM and 980 AM until March 1982, when the AM broke off and flipped to adult contemporary as KKSS. The format change caused the cancellation of a talk show, heard only on the AM frequency, and hosted by Bob Allard. Allard committed suicide in late May. In August 1984, the station changed formats again, this time to adult standards, as KMFY. Low ratings in the station's final months prompted Entercom to return the AM to a simulcast of WAYL in 1987 and lay off its nine separate staff.

=== Hard rock ===
As the 1980s progressed, the easy listening format was fading in popularity. While it had long been a strong ratings draw across the country, advertisers began to shun the older demographics of its listeners. In July 1988, WAYL-FM finally dropped easy listening and switched to classic hits as KLXK. WAYL's call letters and easy listening format initially remained on 980 AM. The AM station also became the new radio home of Minnesota North Stars hockey. On January 15, 1990, the AM also gave up on easy listening and switched to a simulcast of the FM station.

In December 1990, the AM station branched off from its FM sister again when the station picked up the satellite-delivered Z-Rock network, which previously aired on KZOW (950 AM). The new call letters became KMZZ and it began airing hard rock and heavy metal. As the Z-Rock network itself later shifted to a more mainstream rock presentation, KMZZ dropped it on January 1, 1993, and began programming an in-house automated hard rock format as "Mega Rock". Mega Rock did not last long, and the following May, 980 AM returned to simulcasting the FM sister station, now active rock KRXX ("93X").

When Entercom sold KRXX-FM to Capital Cities/ABC in 1994, the AM station was not part of the deal. As a buyer was being sought, 980 was still owned by Entercom, though programmed by local ABC station KQRS-FM through a local marketing agreement (LMA). It continued to simulcast 93.7 FM until a buyer could be found. Upon taking control of the two stations in February, ABC immediately changed the format of KRXX-FM to modern rock as KEGE ("The Edge"). AM 980's call letters remained KRXX until finally picking up the KEGE call letters later that year.

=== Sale to Salem ===
After more than two years on the market, the AM station was finally sold in December 1996 to the Salem Media Group, America's largest Christian radio broadcaster. It adopted a Christian talk and teaching format. The call letters switched to KKMS on December 6, 1996. Today, Salem currently owns three other AM stations in the Twin Cities market. They are based at the same Eagan studios that have housed 980 AM and its broadcast facilities through its many incarnations.

On January 18, 2015, KKMS rebranded as "The Mission". Salem's Christian talk and teaching station in New York City, WMCA 570 AM, also calls itself "The Mission."

== See also ==
- KDWB-FM
- KXXR
