= WZBY =

WZBY may refer to:

- WZBY (FM), a radio station (92.7 FM) licensed to serve Grand Portage, Minnesota, United States; see List of radio stations in Minnesota
- WNFL, a radio station (99.7 FM) licensed to serve Sturgeon Bay, Wisconsin, United States, which held the call sign WZBY from 2006 to 2009
