= Paddy O'Brien (musician and author) =

Irish-American accordionist and author

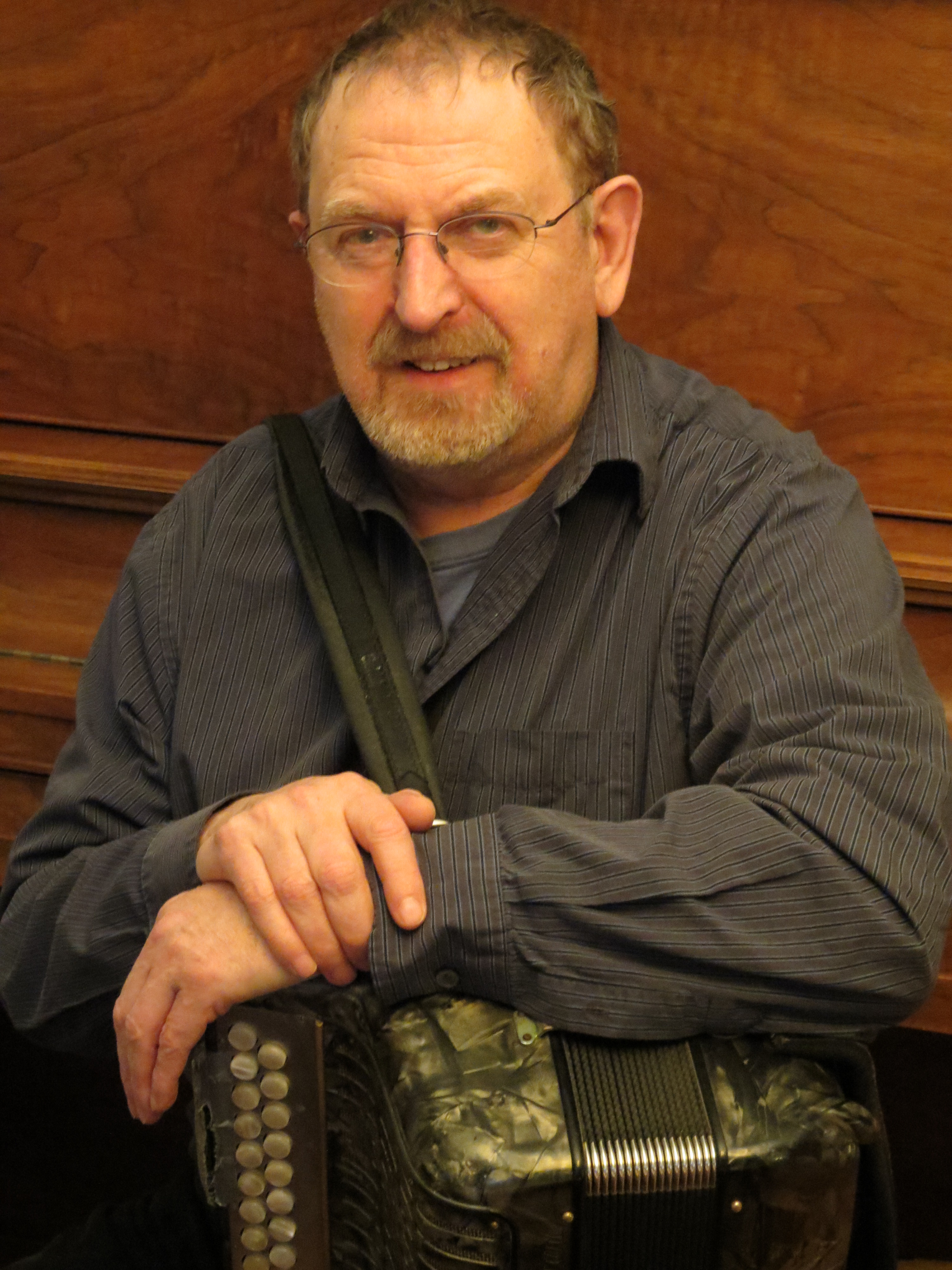
- Born: 13 September 1945 (age 80); Castlebarnagh, County Offaly, Ireland
- Citizenship: US
- Occupations: Musician, author
- Spouse: Erin Hart
- Writing career
- Subject: Irish traditional music
- Notable work: Paddy O'Brien Tune Collection
- Notable awards: All-Ireland, Oireachtas, TG4 Gradam Ceoil Composer of the Year
- Website: paddyobrien.net

Paddy O'Brien (born 13 September 1945) is an Irish accordion player and memoirist, author of The Road from Castlebarnagh: Growing Up In Irish Music and creator of the Paddy O'Brien Tune Collection: A Personal Treasury of Irish Traditional Music, the first published oral collection of Irish traditional music.

== Life and career ==
Paddy O'Brien was born in Castlebarnagh, a small townland outside of Daingean, County Offaly, in the Midlands of Ireland. He is the son of Christopher and Molly O'Brien, who had a small farm in Castlebarnagh. He attended National School in Daingean, and Tullamore Vocational School, and then became an apprentice for Bord na Mona at Boora, where he worked from 1961 to 1969. From an early age, he was interested in traditional music, and played in competitions and on television for RTE. In 1969, O'Brien moved to Dublin and became involved in the Irish traditional music scene there.

Paddy O’Brien is a collector of Irish traditional music; in a musical career that spans more than sixty years, he has collected more than 3,000 compositions—jigs, reels, hornpipes, airs, and marches, including many rare and unusual tunes. He was named Oireachtas champion four times, and All-Ireland senior accordion champion in 1975. In Ireland, he played and recorded with the Castle Ceili Band and Ceoltoiri Laighean.

In 1978, Paddy O'Brien began recording and playing in the United States, in Washington D.C., Saint Louis, Saint Paul, San Francisco, Boston, and New York. He has been featured on six recordings with Shanachie Records since 1978, and in 1988 released his first solo album, "Stranger at the Gate," on the Green Linnet label. His second solo recording, "Mixing the Punch," was released by New Folk Records in 2011, and his work has been included on live recordings and compilations of Irish traditional music.

O'Brien has taught at the Swannanoa Gathering, the Goderich Celtic Week, and the Catskills Irish Arts Week, and at the Willie Clancy Summer School held in Milltown Malbay, County Clare, and has served several times as a master artist in the Minnesota State Arts Board Folk Arts Apprenticeship Program. He has played and toured with other Irish traditional musicians, including James Kelly, Martin Hayes, Susan McKeown, Tommy Peoples, Peter Ostroushko, Patrick Ourceau, and others at concerts and festivals in North America, Ireland, and Europe. In 2007 he was invited to play Irish traditional music for audiences in Moscow.

In 1994, O'Brien embarked on an Irish traditional music project, to record and assemble background information on 500 jigs and reels from his repertoire of traditional melodies. The result was Volume One of The Paddy OBrien Tune Collection: A Personal Treasury of Irish Traditional Music. In 2011, he released The Paddy O'Brien Tune Collection, Volume Two, featuring another 500 tunes, including jigs, reels, hornpipes, slip jigs, and polkas. A third volume of the Paddy O'Brien Tune Collection, Volume Three. containing another 500 tunes, was released in 2013.

O'Brien currently tours nationally and internationally as a solo musician and with his trio Chulrua, and also plays dances and concerts around the American midwest with his seven-piece Irish traditional music group, O'Rourke's Feast. He lives in Saint Paul, Minnesota with his wife, crime novelist Erin Hart.

=== Discography ===
- Castle Céilí Band / Irish Pub Music / Arfolk SB 314 (1970)
- Castle Céilí Band / Castle Céilí Band / Comhaltas Ceoltoiri Éireann (1971)
- Ceoltoiri Laighean / The Crooked Road / Gael-Linn CEF 035 (1973)
- Paddy O’Brien and Seamus Connolly / The Banks of the Shannon / Comhaltas Ceoltóirí Éireann (1973) / Green Linnet (1993 reissue)
- Ceoltoiri Laighean / The Star of Munster / Gael-Linn CEF 047 (1975)
- James Kelly, Paddy O'Brien, and Dáithí Sproule / Is It Yourself? / Shanachie 29015 (1978)
- James Kelly, Paddy O'Brien, and Dáithí Sproule / Spring in the Air / Shanachie 29018 (1982)
- Hill 16 / Hill 16 / Meadowlark101 (1984)
- Paddy O'Brien, Dáithí Sproule, Karen Andersen, Erin Hart / Stranger at the Gate / Green Linnet GLCD 1091 (1988)
- Irish accordion anthology / The Big Squeeze / Green Linnet 9014 (1988)
- Seán O'Driscoll / Up the Airy Mountain (guest) Green Linnet (1988)
- Peter Ostroushko / Blue Mesa (guest)/ Red House Records RHR30 (1989)
- Paddy O'Brien Paddy O'Brien Tune Collection, Volume One (1995)
- James Kelly, Paddy O'Brien, Dáithí Sproule / Traditional Music of Ireland / Shanachie 34014 (1995, re-release)
- Irish music anthology / Hunger No More / Eire Arts, MN Food Share (1997)
- Live concert recording / Gaelic Roots Festival 1995 / Boston College, Kells 9514 (1997)
- Chulrua / Barefoot on the Altar / Pied Piper Productions PPP 301 (2000)
- Irish music anthology / The Ice Palace / Irish Music & Dance Association (2001)
- Chulrua / Down the Back Lane / Shanachie 22001 (2003)
- Paddy O'Brien, Jamie Gans, and Dáithí Sproule / Snug in the Blanket / Black Tea Tunes BTT012 (2004)
- Accordion anthology / Minnesota All Stars / Rounder 82161-6110-2 (2005)
- The Doon Céilí Band / Around the World for Sport / Shanachie 23001 (2006)
- Chulrua / The Singing Kettle / Shanachie 23002 (2007)
- Paddy O'Brien, Dáithí Sproule, Karen Andersen, Erin Hart / Stranger at the Gate / Green Linnet GLI 1091 (re-release by Compass Records, 2008)
- Live concert recording / Young Irish Musicians Weekend / Center for Irish Music (2008)
- Irish music anthology / Hooley in the Heartland / Irish Music & Dance Association (2009)
- Paddy O'Brien, Tom Schaefer, Paul Wehling, Erin Hart / The Sailor's Cravat / New Folk Records WCM001 (2011)
- Paddy O'Brien / Paddy O'Brien Tune Collection, Volume Two (2011)
- Paddy O'Brien, Theresa Baker / Mixing the Punch / New Folk Records WCM003 (2011)
- Paddy O'Brien / Paddy O'Brien Tune Collection, Volume Three (2013)

=== Awards ===
- 1969 Oireachtas / First place Solo Accordion, First place Céilí Band (Castle Ceili Band)
- 1970 Oireachtas / First Place Solo Accordion
- 1973 Oireachtas / First Place Solo Accordion
- 1975 Fleadh Cheoil (All-Ireland) / First Place Senior Accordion
- 1975 Fleadh Cheoil (All-Ireland) / First place Trio with fiddler Joe Ryan and flute player Micheál Ó hAlmhain
- 1977 Oireachtas / First place Solo Accordion, First place Duet with Joe Ryan
- 1989 Minnesota State Arts Board / Master Artist—Folk Arts Apprenticeship
- 1993 Minnesota State Arts Board / Master Artist—Folk Arts Apprenticeship
- 1994 National Endowment for the Arts / Folk Arts Project Grant (To Minnesota Folklife Society)
- 1996 Minnesota State Arts Board / Master Artist—Folk Arts Apprenticeship
- 1998 Minnesota State Arts Board / Master Artist—Folk Arts Apprenticeship
- 2006 Minnesota Irish Fair / Legacy Fund Grant
- 2008 Minnesota State Arts Board / Artist Initiative Grant
- 2009 Bush Foundation, Saint Paul MN / Bush Artist Fellowship
- 2010 Irish Music & Dance Association / IMDA Honors Lifetime Achievement
- 2012 TG4 Gradam Ceoil (Irish Traditional Music Awards)/ Cumadóir – Composer of the Year
- 2013 Minnesota State Arts Board / Folk and Traditional Arts Grant

=== Publications ===
- Dal gCais, Journal of Clare (Vol. 11, 1993) Poems about Willie Clancy and Seamus Ennis
- Paddy O'Brien Tune Collection: Volume One (1995) Library of Congress Card Catalog Number 95-92420
- Paddy O'Brien Tune Collection: Volume Two (2011) Library of Congress Card Catalog Number 95-92420
- The Road from Castlebarnagh: Growing Up In Irish Music, Orpen Press, Dublin (2012) ISBN 978-1871305692
