= WQPM =

- Princeton, Minnesota; United States
- Broadcast area: St. Cloud, Minnesota
- Frequency: 1300 kHz

Programming
- Format: Silent (open-carrier)

Ownership
- Owner: Dennis and Lucas Carpenter; (Milestone Radio LLC)
- Sister stations: KLCI, KDDG, WLKX-FM, KASM, KBGY

History
- First air date: June 28, 1967
- Call sign meaning: W Q Princeton Minnesota (previous format)

Technical information
- Licensing authority: FCC
- Facility ID: 59618
- Class: D
- Power: 1,000 watts day 83 watts night
- Transmitter coordinates: 45°32′58″N 93°34′52″W
- Translator: 107.5 W298CE (Big Lake)

Links
- Public license information: Public file; LMS

WQPM (1300 AM) is a silent radio station licensed to Princeton, Minnesota and serving the St. Cloud area. The station is currently owned by Dennis and Lucas Carpenter, through licensee Milestone Radio LLC.

Radio station KPCS 89.7 licensed to Princeton, shares its tower with WQPM.

On August 17, 2026, a reputable Minnesota-based DXer noted WQPM as being on-air but at very low power with an open-carrier.

== History ==
WQPM signed on June 28, 1967. It was initially licensed for 500 watts, but upgraded to 1,000 watts in 1968.

In the 1980s, WQPM AM was simulcast on FM at 106.3 (now KLCI on 106.1). WQPM-FM at the time, was licensed for 3,000 watts, covering much the same area as its AM counterpart. The format at the time was much the same as it is today.

On September 13, 2018, WQPM changed formats from The Big Q (oldies) to classic hits, branded as "Killer Bee Radio".

On December 21, 2019, the station began stunting. On January 1, 2020, the station returned to The Big Q, playing oldies music once again. It was at the time a simulcast of WLKX-FM in Forest Lake.

On February 13, 2022, WQPM changed its format from oldies to a simulcast of classic country-formatted KLCI 106.1 FM Elk River, branded as "Total Country Bob FM". Big Q Radio, however, continues streaming oldies on the internet: Big Q Live, as well as on KDDG & KLCI 105.5 & 106.1 HD3.

Sister station WLKX in Forest Lake also joined the BOB-FM network.

The station is an affiliate of the Minnesota Lynx basketball team, and games are broadcast on KLCI, as well as its sister stations.
