= WWTC =

Coordinates: 44°47′17.9″N 93°12′54.8″W

- Minneapolis, Minnesota; United States
- Broadcast area: Minneapolis-St. Paul
- Frequency: 1280 kHz
- Branding: AM 1280 The Patriot

Programming
- Format: Talk radio
- Affiliations: Salem Radio Network; Westwood One; Townhall News

Ownership
- Owner: Salem Media Group; (Salem Media of Massachusetts, LLC)
- Sister stations: KDIZ; KKMS; KYCR

History
- First air date: August 10, 1925; 100 years ago (as WRHM)
- Former call signs: WRHM (1925–1934); WTCN (1934–1964); WWTC (1964–1986); KSNE (1986–1988)
- Call sign meaning: Twin Cities (Newspapers) modification of former WTCN calls by new ownership

Technical information
- Facility ID: 9676
- Class: B
- Power: 10,000 watts days; 15,000 watts nights
- Translator: 107.5 K298CO (Minneapolis)

Links
- Webcast: Listen live (via iHeartRadio)
- Website: www.am1280thepatriot.com

WWTC (1280 AM, "The Patriot") is a commercial radio station licensed to Minneapolis, Minnesota, and serving the Twin Cities region. It is owned by Salem Media Group and broadcasts a conservative talk radio format.

By day, WWTC transmits with 10,000 watts. At night, the power is increased to 15,000 watts. WWTC has a directional signal using a four-tower array. The transmitter and radio studios are on Cliff Road near Minnesota State Highway 77 and Interstate 35E in Eagan. Programming is also heard on 250-watt FM translator K298CO at 107.5 MHz.

== Programming ==
On weekdays, WWTC carries nationally syndicated conservative talk shows, largely from the co-owned Salem Radio Network. They include Hugh Hewitt, Mike Gallagher, Chris Stigall, Larry Elder, Charlie Kirk and Eric Metaxas. One program is produced by Westwood One, "The Mark Levin Show."

On weekends, shows on money, health, real estate, movies, the military and aviation are heard, as well as repeats of weekday shows. Some weekend hours are paid brokered programming. Most hours begin with news from Townhall News.

== History ==
=== WRHM and WTCN ===
WWTC is one of the oldest radio stations in the Twin Cities. On August 10, 1925, it signed on as WRHM (for "Rosedale Hospital") at 4429 Nicollet Avenue in Minneapolis. It shared time for a few months with WDGY at both 1140 AM and 1150 AM.

Also that year, the transmitter was moved from the hospital to Fridley. In 1929, WRHM became an affiliate of the CBS Radio Network. It switched to NBC's Blue Network on January 1, 1937. The Rosedale Hospital Company sold the station to the Minnesota Broadcasting Company in 1930.

The studio relocated from the hospital to the new Wesley Temple Building at 123 East Grant Street in Minneapolis. WRHM was purchased in September 1934 by Twin Cities Newspapers, a partnership between the St. Paul Pioneer Press and the Minneapolis Tribune, and the call sign was changed to WTCN at that time. The station remained an NBC Blue Network affiliate through the network's selloff, becoming an ABC affiliate in 1945 when NBC Blue formally became ABC. The station kept the ABC affiliation until December 31, 1962.

WTCN began broadcasting from a new transmitter and tower in Roseville at the intersection of North Snelling Avenue and Minnesota Highway 36 during 1935, a site that was used until 1962 when the station's transmission facilities were moved to the other side of the expanding Twin Cities metro in St. Louis Park, at a point south of what is now Interstate 394 and west of Minnesota Highway 100, using four towers. WTCN moved from 1250 AM to 1280 AM in March 1941 as required by the North American Regional Broadcasting Agreement (NARBA) under which most American, Canadian and Mexican AM radio stations changed frequencies.

=== Forays into FM ===
The station had an experimental FM transmitter by 1939. W9XTC at 26.05 MHz operated for several years, but by 1944, was only being activated intermittently. Local stations KSTP and WCCO also experimented with FM broadcasts around this time.

Once the modern FM band was established, WTCN attempted again to broadcast on WTCN-FM 97.1 from 1947 to 1954. However, few people owned FM receivers in that era and the FM license was surrendered in 1954.

=== Expansion into television ===
On July 1, 1949, Twin Cities Newspapers expanded to television broadcasting with the launch of WTCN-TV on channel 4, becoming the second modern television station in the state after KSTP-TV launched a year earlier. The original studios were in the Radio City Theater building at 9th Street and LaSalle Avenue. WTCN followed its TV sister to Radio City in September 1949. WTCN-FM also moved to the Radio City location around the same time. However, WTCN-TV channel 4 was short-lived.

Twin Cities Newspapers decided to sell WTCN-AM-FM and purchase a majority share of WCCO Radio from CBS three years later. The TV station's call letters were changed to match the newly acquired radio station on August 17, 1952. A new company, Midwest Radio and Television, was formed as a holding company for the WCCO stations; it was later spun off to the Murphy and McNally families. WCCO-TV is currently owned by CBS directly. This TV station has always had a primary CBS affiliation, an affiliation that has remained consistent to this day (although it aired ABC programming as a secondary affiliation in its early years). WCCO-TV remained at the 9th Street location until 1983, when it moved to Nicollet Mall at 11th Street.

WTCN was at the same time sold to the Minnesota Television Service Corporation headed by St. Paul businessman Robert Butler, a former ambassador to Cuba and Australia. The company quickly applied for a new license for channel 11, but had to negotiate for the frequency with the owner of WMIN (1400 AM), which also applied for the channel. The two stations, WTCN and WMIN, arranged to share the channel, alternating every two hours. This became the area's third TV station on September 1, 1953, and the WTCN-TV call sign remained with it until 1985 when it became known as WUSA. Channel 11 was merged and sold to the H.M. Bitner Group in 1955, and eventually was owned by Metromedia for many years. Tegna, Inc. is the current licensee of KARE.

This second incarnation of WTCN-TV was ABC's first full-time television network affiliate in the Twin Cities, but in April 1961, it lost ABC affiliation to then-independent KMSP (now a Fox owned and operated station). For the next 18 years, channel 11 operated without a network affiliation as an independent TV outlet until it picked up the NBC affiliation in March 1979 during a market-wide affiliate switch. Prior to the TV station's current studio location in Golden Valley, its original studios were in the Calhoun Beach Hotel on Lake Street at Dean Boulevard, where the radio station had moved in 1952 following a three-year occupancy downtown with its former TV sister, WTCN-TV (channel 4).

WTCN Radio and TV were sold to Time, Inc., in 1957, and in 1964, the siblings were separated with the TV going to Chris-Craft Industries (which would later own KMSP) while the radio station was purchased by Buckley-Jaeger Broadcasting. The call letters were changed to WWTC on October 1. This change was made due to an FCC rule in place at the time that prohibited stations in the same market, but with different ownership, from having the same fundamental call signs. In early 1965, the radio station relocated to downtown Minneapolis in the Builders Exchange Building at 609 2nd Avenue South, to studios formerly occupied by WDGY. In 1970, WWTC began broadcasting 24 hours a day and played soft popular music.

=== "Golden Rock" ===
Over the years, WWTC had a number of formats, including the distinction of being the Twin Cities' first all-news radio station (using NBC's News and Information Service), beginning in June 1975. In 1979, WWTC switched to a full service adult contemporary format called the "Splendid Blend", which evolved to an oldies format known as the "Golden Rock." The oldies sound achieved the station's highest ratings in years. With a number of quirky DJs such as "Ugly Del" Roberts, Mick "King Kracker" Wagner, and Steve "Boogie" Bowman, the station managed to win an audience.

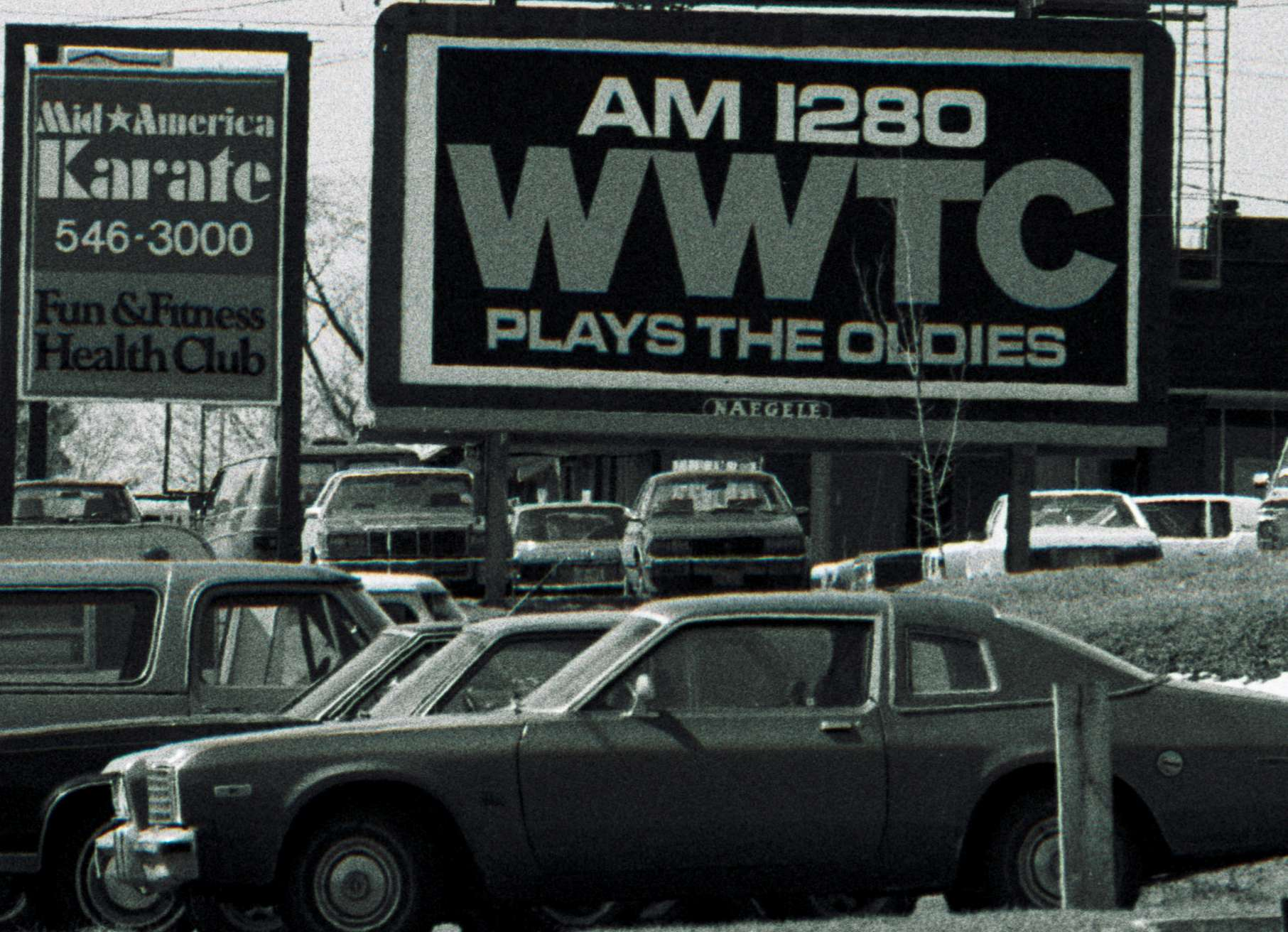
WWTC billboard in 1982

In 1981, WWTC relocated seven blocks south, back to the Wesley Temple Building on East Grant Street, where it occupied the entire top floor until 1986.

=== Various format changes, then a return to oldies ===
The "Golden Rock" format fizzled after a few years, and the station went through a long string of format changes. On November 12, 1984, WWTC adopted a unique locally oriented urban contemporary/alternative rock hybrid format that was called "Metro Music." "Metro Music" ended in September 1985 and, following a month of top-40/Adult Contemporary music, an "all-weather" format made its debut. The automated format was unsuccessful for a few reasons, one of which was WCCO Radio's news/weather dominance, especially during extreme conditions. And WWTC's weather format was sometimes heard playing inaccurate information, such as the day's forecast for sunny weather while a storm was overtaking the area. "Weather Radio 1280" was blown out after 10 months.

"Sunny 1280" was next, a 16-month run as adult standards using new call letters, KSNE (effective June 20, 1986). In November 1987, the station became known as "The Breeze", taking a satellite feed of an early and more diverse form of what is now known as "smooth jazz" from a service run by the former owner of KTWN 108. On May 27, 1988, the station switched back to the legacy WWTC call letters and a second run with the 'Golden Rock' format. During this period, it operated from 215 South 11th Street, in a building in which WCCO-FM (now KMNB) was located for many years.

=== Children's Broadcasting and Radio AAHS ===
WWTC was sold by the Short family to Christopher Dahl in 1990, and launched on May 12 as the flagship of Radio AAHS, a new radio network which aired children's music and programming for kids. The station moved its studios to a former bank at Excelsior Boulevard and Minnesota Highway 100 in St. Louis Park. In 1994, WWTC's new parent company under Dahl's ownership, Children's Broadcasting Corporation, would acquire religious station KYCR, which soon relocated to the WWTC facility. While Radio AAHS would bring some success to WWTC, it would soon face competition from Disney. Disney had been a marketing partner with AAHS; it launched its own network, Radio Disney, on November 18, 1996. ABC-owned station KQRS was Radio Disney's Minneapolis affiliate and one of four charter network stations.

Finding it difficult to compete with Radio Disney, Dahl sued Disney for breaching its agreement with the network, and Radio AAHS ceased operations on January 31, 1998. In 2002, the former Children's Broadcasting owners (who now operate Intelefilm) won their court case against Disney and were awarded $9.5 million. Payments totaling $12.4 million, including $2.6 million in interest, were finally made in 2004.

Following the demise of Radio AAHS, Children's Broadcasting enlisted longtime area programmer, DJ and unlicensed broadcaster Alan Freed to provide interim programming every night for its 10 stations until the stations could be sold. WWTC played random music and syndicated programs during the day. Freed, in addition to having worked at WWTC twice before during its "Golden Rock" and "Metro Music" periods, had set up a pirate radio station in downtown Minneapolis in 1996, broadcasting electronic dance music from his apartment on 97.7 FM. Beat Radio gained a positive response from the public, but was shut down by the FCC after operating at 20 watts for a few months. "Beat Radio" aired across Children's Broadcasting's stations beginning in February 1998 between the shutdown of Radio AAHS and the sale of the CBC stations in late October 1998 to a company planning to run a syndicated service called "Catholic Family Radio." When CFR went bankrupt in 2000, that company sold its stations, including WWTC and sister KYCR, to Salem Communications.

=== "The Patriot" ===
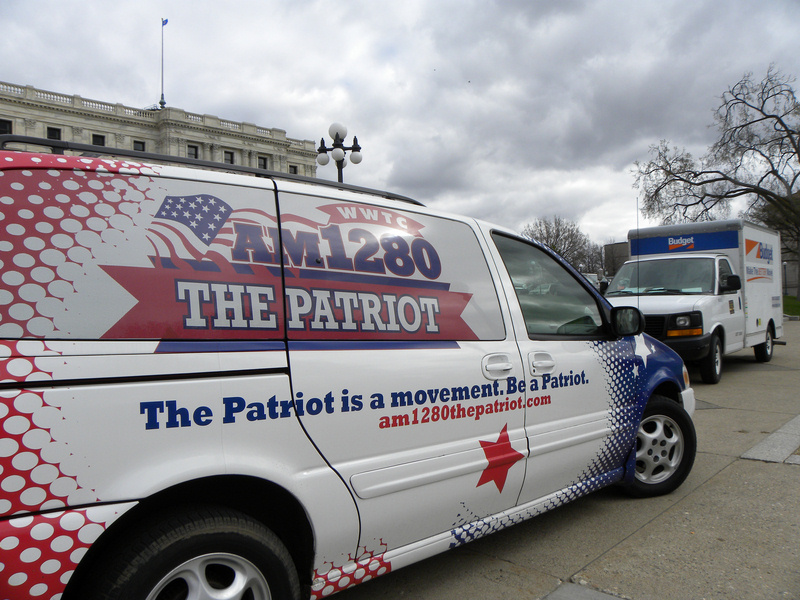
Vehicle at a Tea Party Express rally in 2010

Following the purchase by Salem, WWTC began simulcasting new sister station KKMS, until its new co-located studios in Eagan were ready. On March 19, 2001, Salem branded WWTC as "The Patriot" with a talk format, broadcasting Salem's national stable of conservative hosts, including Dennis Prager, Hugh Hewitt, Larry Elder, Sebastian Gorka, Mark Levin, and Eric Metaxas. The Patriot's locally-focused programs include the long-running Northern Alliance Radio Network, which airs on Saturday and Sunday afternoons and focuses on Minnesota news and related politics.

Salem also ran "The Patriot II" on sister station KYCR in Golden Valley. KYCR's program schedule was initially almost the same as WWTC, with the addition of Bill O'Reilly's midday show, and mostly aired repeats of shows already on WWTC. In 2007, KYCR changed to a separate talk format as "AM 1570: The New Talk of the Twin Cities", and would later shift to a business news format as "Business 1570, Twin Cities Business Radio." In December 2015, KYCR flipped to a health-oriented talk format known as "Wellness Radio 1570". KYCR swapped call letters with KDIZ the same year, with KYCR taking on the business news and talk format.

== Books ==
Area author Jeff Lonto wrote a book about the station in 1998, "Fiasco At 1280" (ISBN 0-9660213-4-7), which covered many of the station's missteps during the 1980s. The book was published just before the demise of "Radio Aahs," so it doesn't include that part of the station's story.
