= Villager (Saint Paul, Minnesota) =

Coordinates: 44.939959°N 93.167011°W

- Type: Twice monthly newspaper
- Format: Tabloid
- Owner: Villager Communications Inc.
- Publisher: Michael Mischke
- President: John Rauch
- Founded: 1953
- Language: English
- Headquarters: 7757 Snelling Ave. S. St. Paul, MN 55116
- City: Saint Paul
- Country: United States
- Circulation: 60,000
- Website: myvillager.com

The Villager, formerly the Highland Villager, is a Saint Paul, Minnesota newspaper. It was founded by Barry Prichard and Arnold Hed in 1953 as the Highland Villager, after Saint Paul's Highland Park neighborhood, and is the Twin Cities' oldest community newspaper. It was the first paper to be distributed in both Minneapolis and Saint Paul. In 2007, it absorbed a sister paper, Avenues (which had been called Grand Gazette till 2003).

As of 2021, the Villager circulates in the Saint Paul neighborhoods of Highland Park, Macalester–Groveland, Merriam Park, Snelling–Hamline, Lexington–Hamline, Summit–University, Summit Hill, West 7th/Fort Road, and Downtown; the Minneapolis neighborhoods of Hiawatha and Minnehaha; and suburban Mendota, Mendota Heights, and Lilydale.

The Villager is published twice a month on Tuesday evenings. It reports a readership of 90,000. The newspaper used to be unavailable online but now its website has digital copies of current editions as well as an archive that subscribers may peruse.
