= Downtown Journal =

Downtown Journal, founded during the 1970s as a print newspaper, was an online and print newspaper serving Minneapolis, Minnesota, in the United States. The paper covered the Minneapolis Mill District, Loring Park, North Loop, Elliot Park and the Mississippi riverfront.

Minnesota Premier Publications, Inc., its parent company, acquired the paper as the Skyway News in 2001 and renamed it Downtown Journal in September 2005. MPP also publishes Southwest Journal, Minnesota Parent and Minnesota Good Age. In April 2007, MPP redesigned its Web sites to concentrate more on online news; and, in July of that year, the Downtown Journal became a biweekly in print.

The Downtown Journal ceased publication in December, 2018.

== See also ==
- Media in Minneapolis-St. Paul
