= KBGY =

Coordinates: 44.212°N 93.339°W

Simulcasting KLCI Elk River
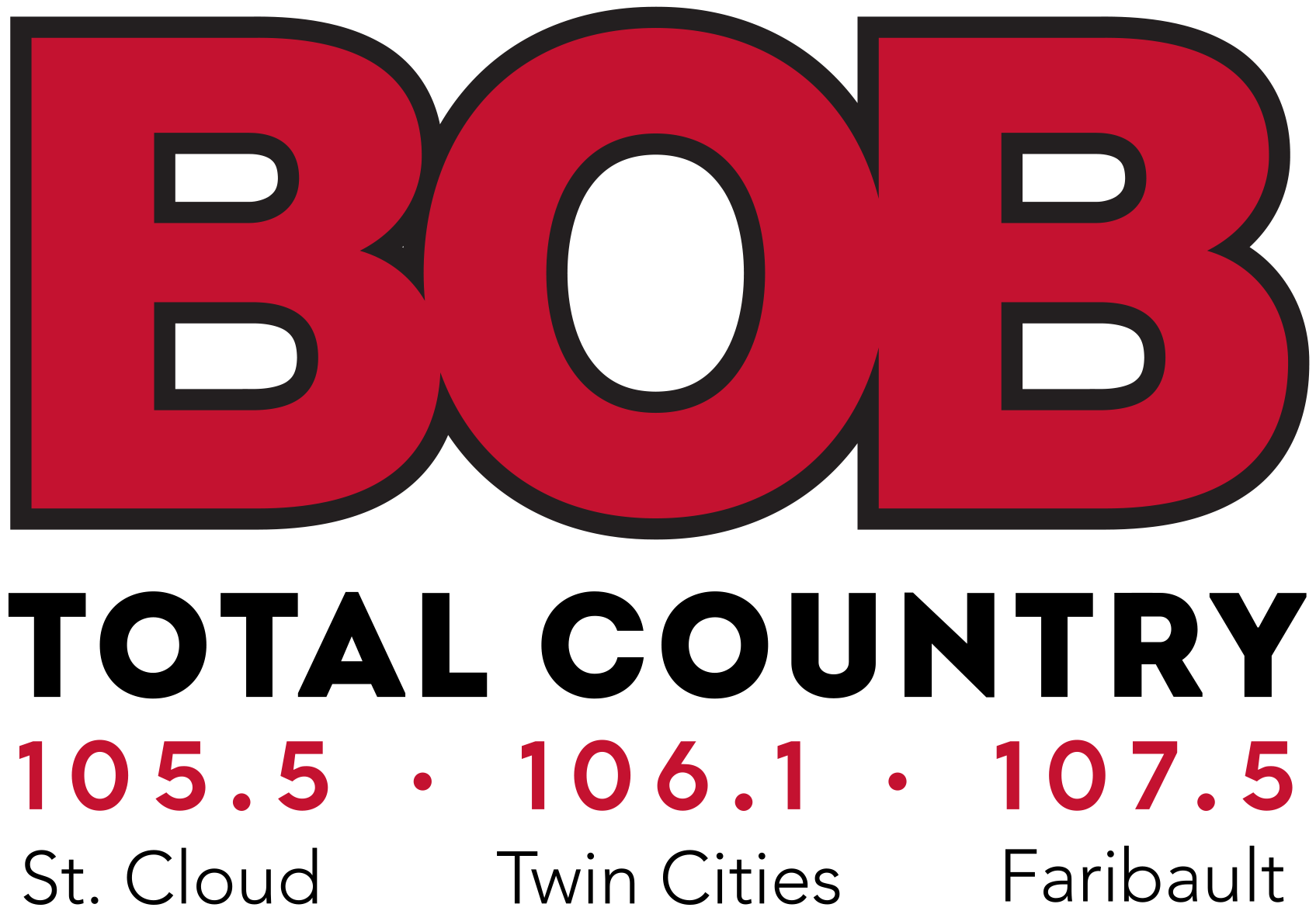
- Faribault, Minnesota; United States
- Frequency: 107.5 MHz
- Branding: Total Country Bob-FM

Programming
- Format: Classic country
- Affiliations: Compass Media Networks; Westwood One

Ownership
- Owner: Dennis and Lucas Carpenter; (Carpenter Broadcasting LLC)
- Sister stations: KLCI, WLKX-FM, WQPM

History
- First air date: 2001

Technical information
- Licensing authority: FCC
- Facility ID: 84475
- Class: C2
- ERP: 48,000 watts
- HAAT: 120 meters (390 ft)

Links
- Public license information: Public file; LMS
- Webcast: Listen Live
- Website: mybobcountry.com

Logo with former format

KBGY (107.5 FM "Bob FM") is a commercial radio station licensed to Faribault, Minnesota, with a signal that reaches Mankato, Rochester and the southern suburbs of the Twin Cities. It simulcasts a classic country radio format along with 106.1 KLCI Elk River and 105.5 KDDG Albany. KBGY is owned by Dennis and Lucas Carpenter, through licensee Carpenter Broadcasting LLC.

== History ==
The station signed on in 2001. After receiving its license, KBGY aired a simulcast of the Christian Contemporary music programming of 95.9 WLKX Forest Lake ("Spirit FM").

In late 2004, KBGY was leased to a radio group which flipped the station's format to Spanish language contemporary hits, the first such station on FM in Minnesota. The station aired Spanish-language broadcasts of select Minnesota Twins games.

On August 4, 2006, the NBA announced that twelve Minnesota Timberwolves basketball games during the 2006–07 season would air on KBGY in Spanish.

KBGY also carries the Minnesota Lynx, WNBA team games along with its sister stations.

KBGY was also a secondary outlet for Minnesota Wild hockey games, when pre-empted by Wild flagship station WCCO 830 AM. These games, however, were in English. The Wild are now on KFXN-FM 100.3 MHz in Minneapolis.

In January 2008, KBGY started simulcasting the morning show from KLCI 106.1 in Elk River, MN, and KDDG 105.5 in Albany, MN. The rest of the day, KBGY had separate programming. In 2015, KBGY started simulcasting KLCI and KDDG full-time, with all three stations calling themselves "Bob FM." In 2022, BOB-FM added a simulcast on WLKX-FM 95.9 in Forest Lake, and WQPM 1300 in Princeton (with its translator on 107.5), effectively bringing the network to six stations.
