= KRSM-LP =

- Minneapolis, Minnesota; United States
- Frequency: 98.9 MHz
- Branding: 98.9 KRSM

Programming
- Format: Public

Ownership
- Owner: Pillsbury United Communities
- Sister stations: WFNU-LP, WEQY-LP

History
- First air date: November 22, 2017
- Call sign meaning: Radio Of South Minneapolis

Technical information
- Licensing authority: FCC
- Facility ID: 196844
- Class: L1
- ERP: 100 Watts
- HAAT: 28.1 meters (92 ft)
- Transmitter coordinates: type:city 44°56′55.00″N 93°16′12.00″W

Links
- Public license information: LMS
- Website: www.krsmradio.org

KRSM-LP (98.9 FM) is an FM radio station broadcasting on a frequency of 98.9 MHz. KRSM-LP has a Public broadcasting format and is licensed to the city of Minneapolis, Minnesota. The station is based out of the Phillips neighborhood of Minneapolis. The station broadcasts programming in six languages: English, Spanish, Somali, Ojibwe, Hmong, and Haitian Creole. The station's studios are located in the Waite House Community Center.

The stations mission is to amplify the voices, stories, cultures and conversations happening in your neighborhood. KRSM is a social enterprise of Pillsbury United Communities. In the past, the station has held fundraisers to help the local community.

KRSM was one of six independent media companies in Minneapolis to form a media partnership. The goal of the group is to create hyper-local advertising for diverse audiences, such as those KRSM serves. Other members of the partnership are Heavy Table, North News, NewsPrensa, and Racket

The station's primary coverage area is from downtown Minneapolis, south to Richfield. The station shares its transmitter with KALY-LP on 101.7.
