= WFNU-LP =

- Saint Paul, Minnesota; United States
- Broadcast area: Frogtown, Saint Paul, Minnesota
- Frequency: 94.1 MHz
- Branding: "Frogtown Community Radio"

Programming
- Format: Variety

Ownership
- Owner: Frogtown Tuned-In
- Sister stations: KRSM-LP, WEQY-LP

History
- First air date: August 3, 2016

Technical information
- Licensing authority: FCC
- Facility ID: 195511
- Class: L1
- Power: 100 Watts
- HAAT: 29.1 m (95 ft)
- Transmitter coordinates: 44°57′22.0″N 93°07′33.0″W

Links
- Public license information: LMS
- Webcast: http://listen.optimizedmedia.net/wfnu128
- Website: Official website

WFNU-LP is a community low-power broadcast radio station licensed to Saint Paul, Minnesota, serving Frogtown and much of Saint Paul on 94.1 MHz. The station has a hyper-local focus on the Frogtown community and surrounding neighborhoods. Programming is varied, with multiple genres of music to local talk with community members. WFNU-LP broadcasts from an antenna on top of the Frogtown Square building on the corner of University Avenue and Dale Street in Frogtown.

Although the station is considered hyper-local due to its small coverage area, it has joined the larger local stations in fundraising for causes over the years. The station's programming is varied, with a mix of local music, talk, and even programs hosted by children. Local celebrities have also donated time to the station to help its hosts.

== History ==
WFNU-LP is the second LPFM radio station in St. Paul (the first being WEQY-LP). The station launched on August 3, 2016 after the organization had been streaming programming online for over a year. The station received help from the Prometheus Radio Project based out of Philadelphia.

== See also ==
- List of community radio stations in the United States
