= WEQY-LP =

- Saint Paul, Minnesota; United States
- Broadcast area: Dayton's Bluff/East Side neighborhoods
- Frequency: 104.7 MHz
- Branding: Power FM 104.7

Programming
- Format: Community radio

Ownership
- Owner: Dayton's Bluff District Four Community Council
- Sister stations: KRSM-LP, WFNU-LP

History
- First air date: September 15, 2015

Technical information
- Licensing authority: FCC
- Facility ID: 194073
- Class: L1
- ERP: 100 watts
- HAAT: 3.5 meters (11 ft)
- Transmitter coordinates: 44°58′2.76″N 93°02′46.09″W (NAD 27)

Links
- Public license information: LMS
- Webcast: Listen live
- Website: www.power1047.fm

WEQY-LP (104.7 FM) is a community radio station licensed to Saint Paul, Minnesota and serves the Dayton's Bluff/East Side neighborhoods. Its broadcast license is held by Dayton's Bluff District Four Community Council.

The station is hyper-local. Its coverage area extends from just east of downtown St. Paul through most of southern Maplewood into Oakdale.

== History ==
The station signed on air in 2015, part of the FCC's roll out of LPFM licenses. The sign on of the station was mostly testing the signal, with a variety of programming. The expected coverage radius was 3.5 miles (6 km), but the station could likely be heard much farther, up to 10 miles (16 km) away. The goal of the station was to cater to the ethnic populations on St. Paul's east side, including broadcasts in different languages. St. Paul's Dayton's Bluff neighborhood is known for its diversity.

The goal of the station was to create a voice for St. Paul's east side.

The station now primarily carries hip hop music, branding itself as Power 104.7. The station's website provides news catered to the St. Paul area. The station is one of three low power FM stations in the Minneapolis/St. Paul metropolitan area that share resources.

This station received its original construction permit from the Federal Communications Commission on March 24, 2014. The new station was assigned the WEQY-LP call sign by the FCC on July 4, 2014. WEQY-LP received its license to cover from the FCC on September 15, 2015.

WEQY is one of two LPFM radio stations on St. Paul's east side. The other station is WVIC-LP 99.1 FM, owned by the Victoria Theater project.

== See also ==
- List of community radio stations in the United States
