= KLCI =

Radio station in Elk River, Minnesota

Coordinates: 45.239°N 93.687°W

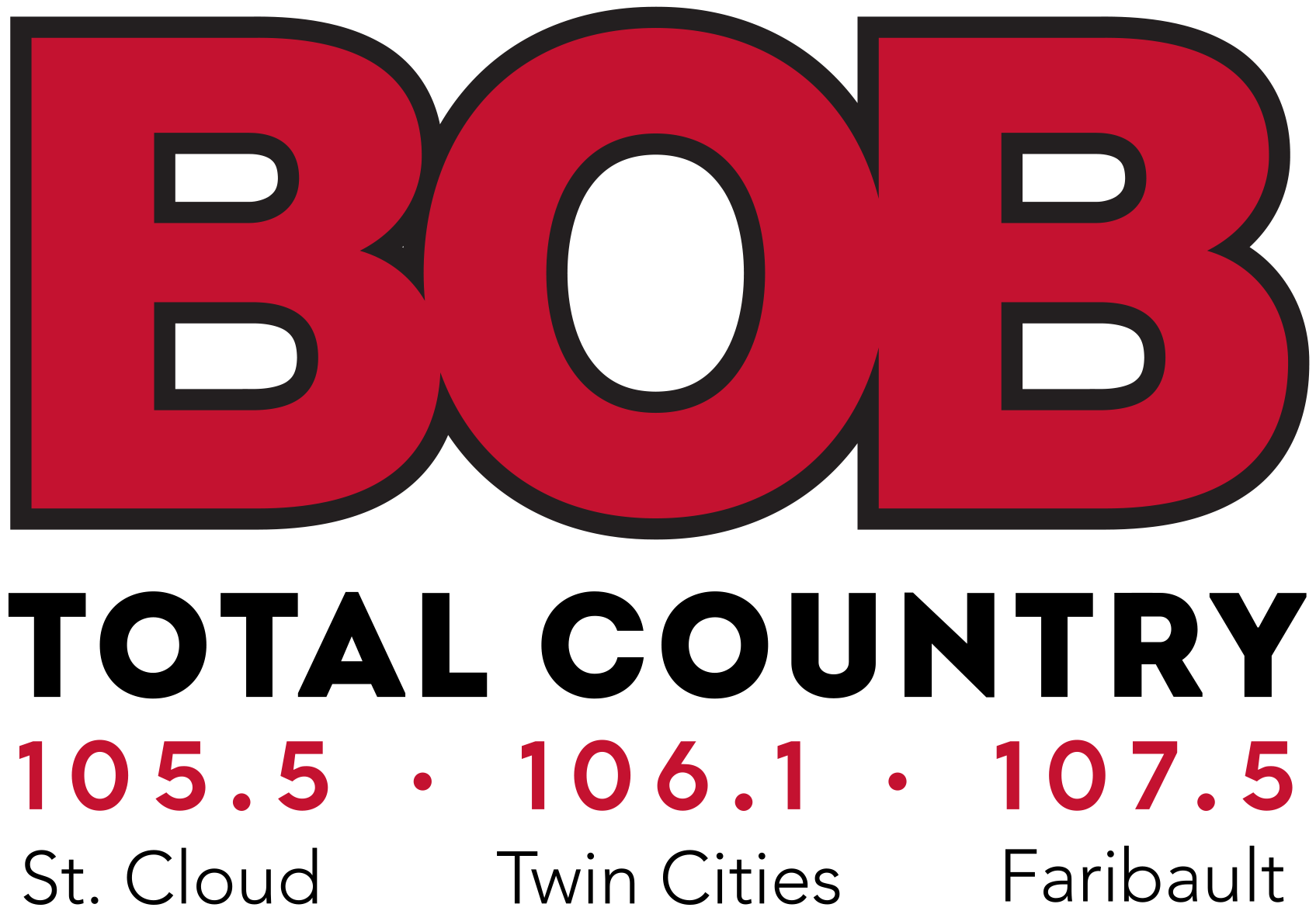
- Elk River, Minnesota; United States
- Broadcast area: Minneapolis-St. Paul
- Frequency: 106.1 MHz (HD Radio)
- RDS: PI: 2D48; PS/RT: Title - Artist - BOB-FM
- Branding: Total Country Bob-FM

Programming
- Format: Classic country
- Affiliations: Compass Media Networks; Westwood One; Minnesota Lynx

Ownership
- Owner: Dennis and Lucas Carpenter; (Milestone Radio LLC)
- Sister stations: KASM, KBGY, KDDG, WLKX-FM, WQPM

History
- First air date: December 1, 1974
- Former call signs: WQPM-FM (1974–1998); KSLI (5/1998-6/1998)
- Former frequencies: 106.3 MHz (1974–1992)

Technical information
- Licensing authority: FCC
- Facility ID: 59617
- Class: C3
- ERP: 9,100 watts
- HAAT: 164 meters (538 ft)
- Repeaters: 1300 WQPM (Princeton); 95.9 WLKX-FM (Forest Lake); 105.5 KDDG (Albany); 107.5 KBGY (Faribault)

Links
- Public license information: Public file; LMS
- Webcast: Listen Live; Listen Live (HD3)
- Website: mybobcountry.com HD3: bigqradio.com

KLCI (106.1 FM) is a commercial radio station serving the Minneapolis-Saint Paul area of Minnesota. It is licensed to Elk River and it simulcasts a classic country radio format with several other stations owned by Dennis and Lucas Carpenter. Its studios are on Armstrong Boulevard, off U.S. Route 10 in Ramsey. KLCI has a playlist of past country hits, mainly focusing on the 1980s and 1990s, with some newer titles sprinkled in, branded as "TOTAL Country BOB-FM."

KLCI has an effective radiated power (ERP) of 9,100 watts. The transmitter is off Kadler Avenue NE in Otsego.

Bob 106 logo used until March 2008

== History ==
The station signed on the air as WQPM-FM on December 1, 1974. It was the sister station of WQPM 1300 AM, largely simulcasting its programming. WQPM-FM was powered at 3,000 watts, broadcasting from a tower next to Highway 169 in Princeton, its initial city of license.

The station's nickname, "BOB-FM", came from a former Twin Cities country station, BOB 100, which changed formats in 1997 to an all-rock format with The Howard Stern Show in morning drive time. KLCI picked up the nickname and referred to itself as "The New BOB". The station was previously known as Q-106 (WQPM-FM), with the same country format.

In 1992, WQPM-FM changed frequencies from 106.3 to 106.1 and went from 3,000 watts to a 5,000 watt signal off of the then-KXLI Tower (now KPXM Tower). The first song played on 106.1 was the 1992 number one hit single "There Ain't Nothin' Wrong with the Radio" by Aaron Tippin. The signal was upgraded to 9,100 watts when its facilities moved from Big Lake to Albertville. The station's city of license went from Princeton to Elk River in October 2001.

Since 2006, BOB-FM has been flagship station of Minnesota Lynx. The Lynx are part of the Women's National Basketball Association.

In 2007, BOB 106 hired the long-time Twin Cities morning duo of Chuck & Jon (Chuck Knapp and Jon Engen). They had been the number-two morning show in the Twin Cities area at KTIS-FM. Jim Erickson later became the station's wake-up host.

BOB-FM programming can be heard on KLCI/106.1; KDDG/105.5 in Albany-St. Cloud; WQPM/1300 in Princeton; WLKX-FM/95.9 in Forest Lake; and KBGY/107.5 in Faribault, covering Southern Minnesota.

== Programming ==
=== Monday–Friday ===
The BOB Morning Show is hosted by Jim Erickson. He also hosts the All Request Lunch Hour. Erickson is a play-by-play announcer for the Minnesota State Hockey Tournament.

The No-Repeat Workday is hosted by Geoff Jones, who also hosts the BOB Classic Vault on Sundays.

=== Other programming ===
MN Military Radio is hosted by Doug Wortham and volunteer host and Vietnam veteran Tom Lyons. The show features interviews with veterans and family members about their stories.

The Homegrown Show is hosted by Brandon Backstrom. The show features local independent music.

JimBob Sports Jamboree is hosted by Jim Rich and Bob Sansevere with former Minnesota Vikings running back Chuck Foreman and former NFL longsnapper Mike Morris. The show focuses on a mix current and past sports discussions with the guest NFL players and the long-time radio and TV personalities.
