= KDIZ (AM) =

Coordinates: 44°59′18.9″N 93°21′7.8″W

- Golden Valley, Minnesota; United States
- Broadcast area: Minneapolis-St. Paul
- Frequency: 1570 kHz
- Branding: Freedom 1570

Programming
- Format: Conservative talk
- Network: Townhall News
- Affiliations: Radio America; Salem Radio Network; Westwood One; Saint John's University Football

Ownership
- Owner: Salem Media Group; (Salem Communications Holding Corporation)
- Sister stations: KKMS; KYCR; WWTC

History
- First air date: October 27, 1961; 64 years ago (as KUXL)
- Former call signs: KUXL (1961–1988); KYCR (1988–2015)
- Call sign meaning: Taken from sister station and former Radio Disney owned-affiliate KYCR

Technical information
- Licensing authority: FCC
- Facility ID: 10828
- Class: B
- Power: 4,000 watts days; 220 watts nights

Links
- Public license information: Public file; LMS
- Webcast: Listen live
- Website: freedom1570.com

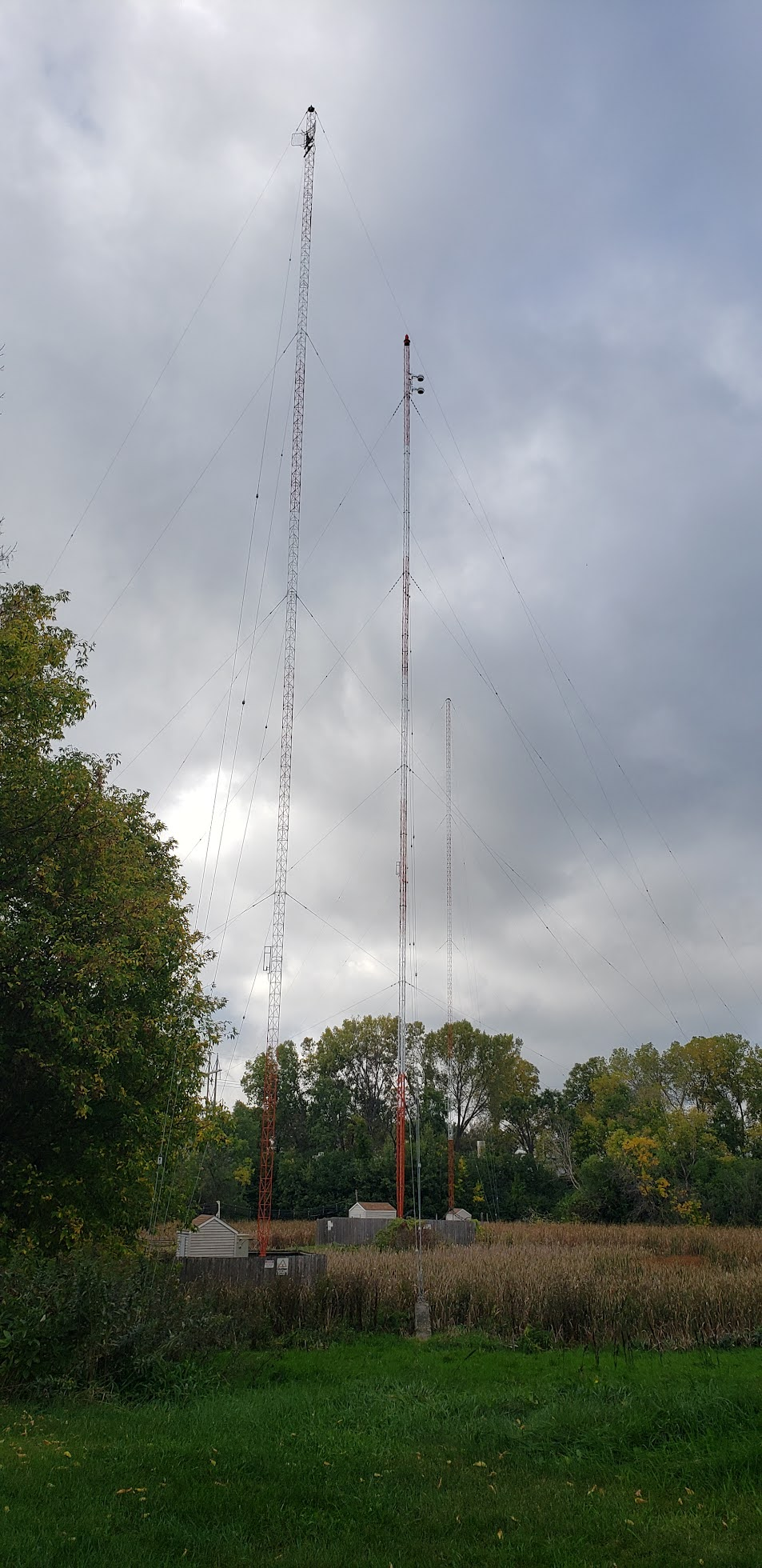
Radio towers for KDIZ 1570 shared with KYCR 1440.

KDIZ (1570 kHz "Freedom 1570") is a commercial AM radio station licensed to Golden Valley, Minnesota, and serving the Twin Cities radio market. It is owned by the Salem Media Group and it airs a conservative talk radio format. KDIZ's radio studios are on Cliff Road near Minnesota State Highway 77 and Interstate 35E in Eagan.

By day, KDIZ transmits 4,000 watts; because 1570 AM is a Mexican clear channel frequency, KDIZ reduces power at night to 220 watts to avoid interference. The signal is non-directional at all times. The transmitter is on Lilac Drive North in Golden Valley, near Minnesota State Highway 100.

== Programming ==
Salem Media owns two talk stations in the Twin Cities: WWTC carries mostly programs from the co-owned Salem Radio Network. Meanwhile, KDIZ carries nationally syndicated hosts from Westwood One (Vince Coglianese, Red Eye Radio and Mark Levin) and CBS Radio (Dana Loesch) as well as some Salem hosts (Charlie Kirk, Chris Stigall, Jay Sekulow and Eric Metaxas).

In the fall, KDIZ airs St. John's University college football games. Weekends feature shows on health, money, guns, veterans, golf, technology and cars, some of which are paid brokered programming. Most hours begin with Townhall News, similar to WWTC.

== History ==
=== KUXL ===
The station signed on the air on October 27, 1961. The original call sign was KUXL and it had a long history of being a Christian radio station. In the 1960s and 1970s, KUXL played urban gospel and R&B music, among other programming, prior to becoming a full-time religious station.

For much of its history, the station was a daytimer, required to go off the air at night because it broadcast on a Mexican clear channel frequency. Its studios and offices were originally located at 4820 Olson Highway in Golden Valley. The operations later moved to Duluth Street. The transmitter and antenna were first co-located with KQRS (1440 AM) on Minnesota State Highway 100 and later on the station's own tower, a block away from the Duluth Street studios, next to Highway 100.

In the mid-1960s, the station was operated by Marvin Kosofsky. Kosofsky hired Bob Smith (a.k.a. Wolfman Jack), who relocated from Del Rio, Texas, to run the station with a mostly R&B format. Also at KUXL at this time were Art Hoehn (a.k.a. Fat Daddy Washington) and former KDWB personality Ralph Hull (a.k.a. Preacher Paul Anthony and The Nazz). It was this trio of broadcasters who took control of "border blaster" station XERB, in Baja California, in 1965. They operated the "Big X" from Minneapolis initially, then relocated to Southern California in 1966.

KUXL sponsored numerous concerts by such artists as Ike and Tina Turner, the Four Tops, B. B. King, Solomon Burke, the Temptations, Jimmy Reed, Jr. Walker, the Impressions and Fats Domino.

KUXL was a ratings success in the early 1970s. Some of the on-the-air talent from that era included Maury Bernstein, a noted musicologist/folklorist who later hosted for National Public Radio. Bernstein was the major authority on Scandinavian music in the U.S. Bob Allard was famed Twin Cities talk show host and television (KMSP) newscaster. Allard was one of the best-known voices in Twin Cities broadcasting history. Allard was known for portraying the character "Cactus Jim" on both radio and television on WOC Television in Davenport, Iowa in the 1950s. Chris Robbins, also known as John Ryan, also worked for WTCN-TV. Brian Tolzmann was the youngest major market news director in the country at the time. He later hosted a nationally syndicated radio show, and worked with former KUXL manager Wolfman Jack on several national concert shows. Steve Blitz and talk show hosts Joe Barbeau and Jim King were also part of the staff in the early 1970s.

=== KYCR ===
The call letters changed to KYCR in May 1988.

KYCR was in 1994 purchased by Children's Broadcasting Corporation, parent of the Radio Aahs children's format, becoming a sister to Aahs flagship station WWTC (1280 AM). KYCR retained its religious format as studios were co-located with WWTC at Excelsior Boulevard and Highway 100 in St. Louis Park. In 1995, the transmitter was moved a few miles south of its longtime tower to WWTC's 4-tower transmission facility in St. Louis Park, west of Highway 100 and south of Interstate 394.

KYCR was acquired by religious and conservative broadcast company Salem Communications in 1998. Two years later, they bought WWTC, and both stations moved to the facility of Salem's KKMS in Eagan (transmission continued from the WWTC/KYCR site in St. Louis Park). From 2002 until 2007, KYCR was a time-shifted version of WWTC "The Patriot" as "The Patriot II". The format was then changed to a general talk format with its own identity, simply known as "AM 1570: The New Talk of the Twin Cities". In April 2007, KYCR lost syndicated talk-show host Don Imus from the lineup after the network cancelled the show. After two months of a Dr. Laura replay in the slot, the show was replaced by The War Room with Quinn and Rose from WPGB in Pittsburgh, becoming the first affiliate for the show in the midwest. Until April 2009, other programming included Dennis Miller, The Radio Factor, Laura Schlessinger, Lars Larson, Janet Parshall, and Mark Levin.

On August 13, 2008, North Dakota State University announced that KYCR would become the home of NDSU Bison football broadcasts for the 2008 season. This makes the station the first affiliate in the Twin Cities area for NDSU sports.

The station attempted yet another format change on March 30, 2009, this time to an all-business format, carrying programming from the Bloomberg News business network. The station's slogan changed to "Business 1570 -- Twin Cities Business Radio."

=== KDIZ and Freedom 1570 ===
On December 15, 2015, KYCR began stunting with a loop directing listeners to KDIZ (1440 AM), with KYCR's business news format moving to that station. On December 24, Salem changed the call letters of 1570 AM to KDIZ. On January 11, 2016, the station relaunched as "Wellness Radio", a first-of-its-kind Health & Wellness talk format.

On November 30, 2019, KDIZ began stunting with a loop of morse code, unusual noises, radio crackle, and voice messages, and advising listeners to tune in on the morning of December 2 for an announcement. On the promised date, KDIZ flipped to conservative talk as "Freedom 1570".

== See also ==
- WWTC
