= Eric Metaxas =

American conservative talk show host

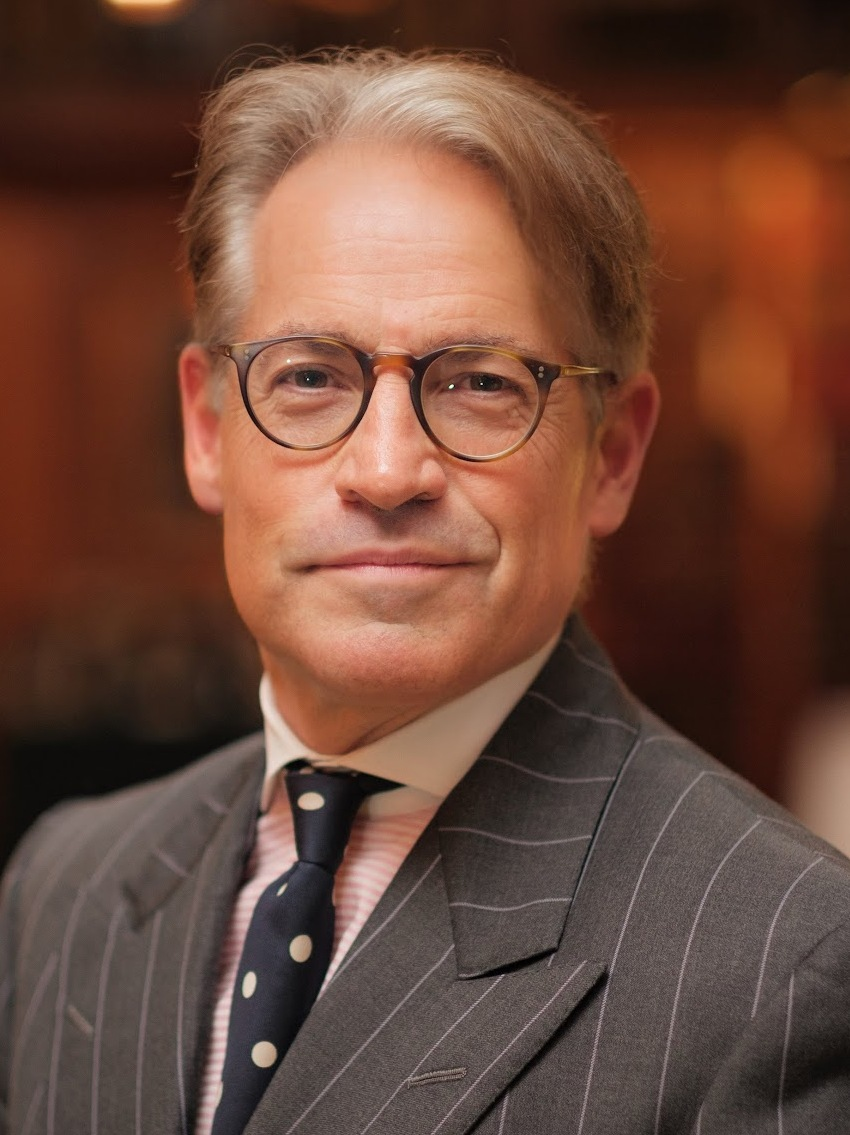
- Metaxas in 2022
- Born: June 27, 1963 (age 63); New York City, U.S.
- Education: Yale University (BA)
- Occupations: Author, talk show host
- Writing career
- Genres: Biographies; history; Christian
- Website: ericmetaxas.com

Eric Metaxas (/məˈtæksəs/; born June 27, 1963) is an American author, speaker, and conservative radio host. He has written three biographies, Amazing Grace: William Wilberforce and the Heroic Campaign to End Slavery about William Wilberforce (2007), Bonhoeffer: Pastor, Martyr, Prophet, Spy about Dietrich Bonhoeffer (2011), and Martin Luther: The Man Who Rediscovered God and Changed the World (2017). He published a memoir, Fish Out of Water: A Search for the Meaning of Life (2021) as well as several books, including If You Can Keep it (2017) and Letter to the American Church (2022). He has also written humor, children's books, including political ones praising Donald Trump, and scripts for VeggieTales. He has called those acknowledging the election of US President Joe Biden in 2020 "enemies of this country."

== Biography ==
Metaxas was born in the New York City neighborhood of Astoria, Queens, and grew up in Danbury, Connecticut. He is Greek on his father's side and German on his mother's; he was raised in the Eastern Orthodox Church. He graduated from Yale University (1984, B.A., English). While there, he edited The Yale Record, the nation's oldest college humor magazine.

=== Writing ===
Metaxas is the author of more than thirty children's books, including the bestsellers Squanto and the Miracle of Thanksgiving and It's Time to Sleep, My Love, illustrated by Nancy Tillman. His books have been translated into more than twenty-five languages.

Metaxas' works If You Can Keep It: The Forgotten Promise of American Liberty and Miracles: What They Are, Why They Happen, and How They Can Change Your Life are both New York Times bestselling books, though both were flagged in the rankings for bulk purchases. Metaxas' biography of Wilberforce, Amazing Grace: William Wilberforce and the Heroic Campaign to End Slavery, was the companion book to the 2006 film.

Bonhoeffer: Pastor, Martyr, Prophet, Spy was named the 2010 Evangelical Christian Publishers Association Christian Book of the Year. Bonhoeffer is a New York Times best seller, climbing to No. 1 in the e-book category. It also won the 2011 John C. Pollock Award for Christian Biography awarded by Beeson Divinity School and a 2011 Christopher Award. Although the book is popular in the United States among evangelical Christians, Bonhoeffer scholars have criticized Metaxas' book as unhistorical, theologically weak, and philosophically naive. Professor of German history and Bonhoeffer scholar Richard Weikart, for example, credits his "engaging writing style" but claims that Metaxas has a lack of intellectual background to interpret Bonhoeffer properly. The biography has also been criticized by Bonhoeffer scholars Victoria Barnett and Clifford Green. Despite these widespread and substantial criticisms of his work by experts on Bonhoeffer, Metaxas' book has been praised by popular magazines as a "weighty, riveting analysis of the life of Dietrich Bonhoeffer" which "bring[s] Bonhoeffer and other characters to vivid life".

Martin Luther: The Man Who Rediscovered God and Changed the World became a New York Times bestselling book in October 2017 and claimed a New York Times Editor's Pick in December 2017. Carlos Eire gave the book a full-page review in The New York Times, stating, "Metaxas knows how to tell a story and how to develop characters, and this talent makes his narrative at once gripping and accessible." But he also accused Metaxas of doing naive Whig history, portraying Luther as "a titanic figure who single-handedly slays the dragon of the Dark Ages, rescues God from an interpretive dungeon, invents individual freedom and ushers in modernity." Catholic church historian John Vidmar writes that Metaxas ignored more than a century of scholarship on Luther in order to write a "sweeping and largely uncritical endorsement for Martin Luther." To reach his conclusions, Vidmar writes, "Metaxas needs to misunderstand, denigrate, and then caricature centuries of human effort and achievement in language that is colloquial, casual, and often flippant."

If You Can Keep It: The Forgotten Promise of American Liberty was released on June 14, 2016. Seven Women was released in November 2016. Seven More Men, released in April 2020, is the sequel to Seven Men. Is Atheism Dead?, released October 19, 2021, is a response to the 1966 Time cover "Is God Dead?". Fish Out of Water: A Search for the Meaning of Life, released February 2, 2021. Letter to the American Church, released September 20, 2022.

Metaxas' other writing has been published in the Atlantic Monthly, The New York Times, and The Wall Street Journal.

=== Other work ===
Metaxas is the founder and host of a New York City event series, called "Socrates in the City: Conversations on the Examined Life," where he interviews thinkers and writers, and is labeled as a forum on "life, God, and other small topics" in Metaxas' book about the series. Guests to SItC have been the likes of, and not limited to Francis Collins, Malcolm Gladwell, Sir John Polkinghorne, Kathleen Norris, Richard John Neuhaus, Dick Cavett, N. T. Wright, Jean Bethke Elshtain, Dm. Alice von Hildebrand, Peter Hitchens, Sir Jonathan Sacks, and Caroline Kennedy.

In the late 1990s, Metaxas wrote BreakPoint radio commentaries for former Richard Nixon aide and Prison Fellowship founder Charles "Chuck" Colson. Upon Colson's death in 2012, Metaxas, along with John Stonestreet, became the voice of BreakPoint, which now airs weekdays on 1350 outlets across the country.

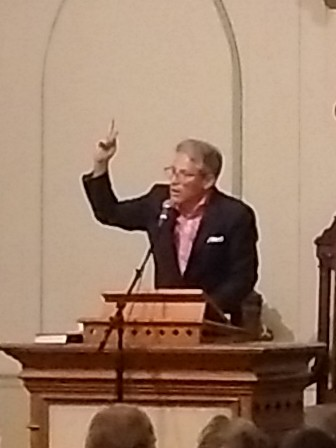
Metaxas speaking at Ocean Grove, New Jersey, in 2018

On February 2, 2012, Metaxas was the keynote speaker for the 2012 National Prayer Breakfast. Metaxas has testified before Congress about the rise of anti-Semitism in the U.S. and abroad, and he spoke at the Conservative Political Action Conference in 2013 and 2014 on the issue of Religious Freedom.

Metaxas was awarded the Becket Fund's Canterbury Medal in 2011 and the Human Life Review's Defender of Life Award in 2013. Metaxas has received honorary doctoral degrees from Hillsdale College, Liberty University, Sewanee: The University of the South, Ohio Christian University, and Colorado Christian University.

In April 2015, Metaxas began hosting The Eric Metaxas Show. The show is a two-hour, daily, nationally syndicated radio program broadcast from the Empire State Building in New York and syndicated by the Salem Radio Network. Notable guests have included Dick Cavett, David Brooks, Kirsten Powers, Kathie Lee Gifford, N. T. Wright, Peter Hitchens (brother of Christopher Hitchens), Jimmie "J.J." Walker, Andrew Garfield, Maria Butina, Milo Yiannopoulos, Ross Douthat, Tony Shalhoub, Morgan Freeman, Jeff Allen, Senator Rand Paul, Joseph Fiennes, Darryl Strawberry, and Suzy Welch.

On August 27, 2020, Metaxas was at Trump's Republican National Convention acceptance speech on the White House lawn. Afterwards, Metaxas left the White House with a crowd of people, entering streets where protesters had been staging demonstrations. Video footage (shared on Instagram and later removed) showed anti-Trump protester Anthony Harrington biking past a group of Trump supporters, yelling "Fuck Trump, fuck you!" As Harrington passed by, Metaxas punched him in the head. Metaxas later admitted punching Harrington because Harrington was verbally abusive and he "felt threatened." Harrington disputed this characterization, stating, "He attacked me. I wasn't threatening or intimidating. I was on a rented bicycle", and that he may pursue a civil case against Metaxas.

In October 2025, The Guardian reported that it had received leaked documents which revealed that in 2022 the Ziklag organization emailed its members to ask them to donate money for the filming of pilot episodes of a right-wing Christian-leaning late night talk show hosted by Metaxas that Ziklag said would provide a more inclusive alternative to what he deemed the predominantly left-wing content of existing late-night talk shows. Four pilot episodes of the show, titled The Talk Show with Eric Metaxas, were produced, but no network picked up the show. In reviewing the four pilot episodes, The Guardian stated that the show was modeled closely on existing late night shows, but that Metaxas's attempts at telling jokes demonstrated that he lacked comedic talent and that the show's interview segments were boring, failing to land interviews with any guests of recent note or to explore topical issues with the guests it did book.

== Personal life ==
Metaxas lives in Manhattan with his wife and daughter. In 2025, Metaxas was appointed as one of the inaugural Distinguished President's Fellows at Cornerstone University and serves the community through mentorship, teaching, public dialogue and more.

Though he has not formally left the Greek Orthodox Church (saying he has "great respect" for it), Metaxas later began attending Calvary-St. George's Episcopal Church in Manhattan. He has spoken at Times Square Church. he describes himself as a "mere Christian", drawing on C. S. Lewis. In 2007, he said his books "don't touch upon anything at all where Protestants, Catholics, and Orthodox Christians differ. They express just the basics of the faith, from a basic, ecumenical Christian viewpoint. They only talk about the Christian faith that they have agreement on." In his book Martin Luther, however, Metaxas criticized the political power structures that had emerged from the medieval Catholic Church and stated that it was only with Luther that the "true Gospel" was rescued "from under its crushing welter of ecclesiastical and political medieval structures."

== Political views ==
Metaxas is a prominent supporter of Donald Trump. In 2019, he published two children's books called Donald Builds the Wall and Donald Drains the Swamp in a series called "Donald the Caveman". Other characters in the book include those Metaxas has called "an angry little girl who looks a little bit like AOC" and "an angry, crazy old man who looks a little bit like a guy named Bernie." In a November 2019 interview with Franklin Graham, Metaxas said that "screaming protesters" to Trump were "almost demonic".

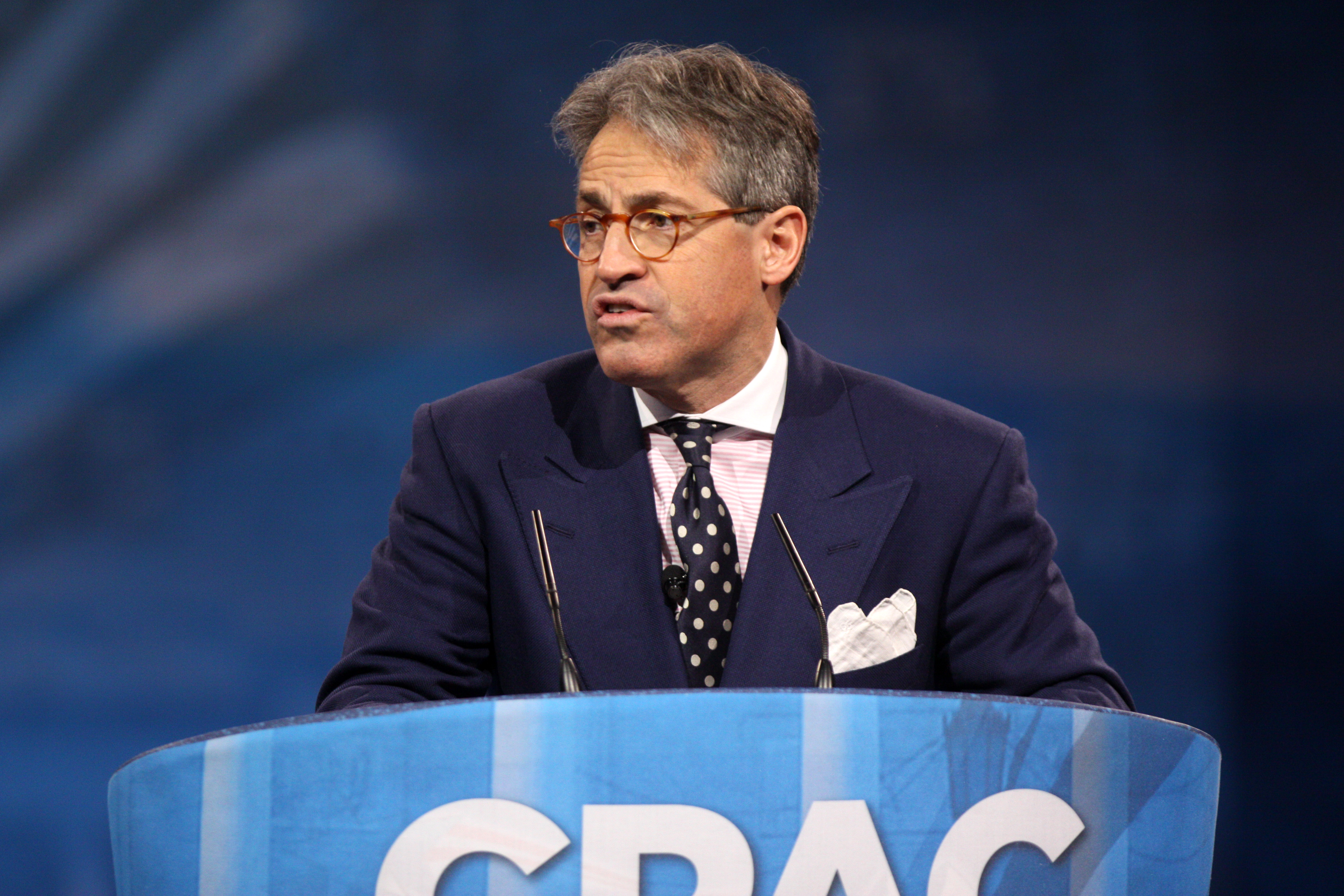
Metaxas speaking at the 2013 Conservative Political Action Conference

After the 2020 presidential election, Metaxas endorsed Donald Trump's false claim that the election was tainted by voter fraud, predicting on Twitter: "Trump will be inaugurated. For the high crimes of trying to throw a U.S. presidential election, many will go to jail." Metaxas also told Trump on Metaxas' radio show that "Jesus is with us in this fight" to overturn the 2020 election. "I'd be happy to die in this fight", Metaxas added. In an appearance on Charlie Kirk's show, he repeated the claim saying, “We need to fight to the death, to the last drop of blood.”

Amid the COVID-19 pandemic, Metaxas told his followers not to get the vaccine.
