= WLKX-FM =

Coordinates: 45.294°N 93.073°W

Simulcasting KLCI Elk River
- Forest Lake, Minnesota; United States
- Broadcast area: Northeastern Twin Cities area
- Frequency: 95.9 MHz
- Branding: Total Country Bob-FM

Programming
- Format: Classic country
- Affiliations: Compass Media Networks; Westwood One; Minnesota Lynx

Ownership
- Owner: Dennis and Lucas Carpenter; (Carpenter Broadcasting LLC)
- Sister stations: KBGY, WQPM, KLCI

History
- First air date: 1978
- Call sign meaning: derived from "Lakes"

Technical information
- Licensing authority: FCC
- Facility ID: 36404
- Class: A
- ERP: 6,000 watts
- HAAT: 100 meters (330 ft)

Links
- Public license information: Public file; LMS
- Webcast: Listen Live
- Website: mybobcountry.com

WLKX-FM (95.9 MHz) is a commercial radio station licensed to Forest Lake, Minnesota, and serving the northern suburbs of the Twin Cities. It is owned by Dennis and Lucas Carpenter, through licensee Carpenter Broadcasting LLC. Their holdings include WQPM in Princeton, KLCI in Elk River, and KBGY in Faribault.

The station airs a classic country radio format, and has an effective radiated power (ERP) of 6,000 watts.

== History ==
WLKX-FM traces its origins to 1978, when the Forest Lake-area station signed on at noon. A Forest Lake local-history timeline states that the first official broadcast opened with the announcement, "Good Afternoon. This is the first official broadcast of WLKX FM coming to you from Forest Lake, Minnesota," followed by the National Anthem. Early programming included news, weather, a "Pet Patrol" segment, and Sunday-morning religious programming. FCCdata lists the station as WLKX-FM on 95.9 MHz, with Facility ID 36404, and shows that its license to cover was granted on May 23, 1979.

In its early years, WLKX was operated by Lakes Broadcasting Co. A Minnesota broadcast directory listed Ed Cary as president and Joanne Rusch-Cary as vice president, and described WLKX-FM's format as AC/MOR, with NBC, Talknet, and UPI affiliations. By the mid-1990s, WLKX was known as "Lakes Country 95.9", serving the northern Twin Cities metro area.

In 1995, Billboard reported that WLKX changed from ABC/Satellite Music Network's country format to Morningstar's "Today's Christian Music" format. The Christian format was later known first as "Spirit 95.9" and then as "Hope 95.9".

A major ownership change followed in 2000. Broadcasting & Cable reported a $1.9 million stock sale of WLKX-FM from Lakes Broadcasting Co. to Polaris Communications LLC, associated with Daniel Peters and HomeNet Inc.; the sellers were identified as Lakes Broadcasting Co., with Eddie S. and Joanne M. Cary owning 98 percent of the company. FCCdata shows a transfer from Eddie S. Cary and others to Polaris Communications LLC granted in September 2000, followed by a transfer from Polaris to HomeNet Inc. granted in October 2000.

WLKX continued with its Christian format until 2013, when the station changed to a Spanish-language format mixing Regional Mexican and Tropical music as "La Neta". NorthPine reported that some weekend English-language programming remained on WLKX, including NDSU Bison football and "Bear Facts and Fish Tales", while the former "Hope" Christian format continued on KLCI-HD2. In 2014, KDDG 105.5 began a nighttime simulcast of WLKX's "La Neta" programming from 9 p.m. to 5 a.m.

By the late 2010s, WLKX was part of an oldies format known as "The Big Q". In September 2018, the group changed to a rock-based classic hits/classic rock format called "Killer Bee". After a Christmas-music interlude in December 2019, "The Big Q" returned at midnight on January 1, 2020, on WLKX, WQPM 1300 Princeton, translator W298CE Big Lake, KLCI-HD3, and KDDG-HD3.

In 2021, WLKX and co-channel KQCL Faribault completed coordinated upgrades. NorthPine reported that the two short-spaced 95.9 MHz stations had to agree to the upgrades so both could increase from 3,000 watts to 6,000 watts. For WLKX, the upgrade pushed its 60 dBu contour closer to Interstate 694.

In February 2022, WLKX joined the classic country "Bob FM" simulcast. NorthPine reported that WLKX, WQPM, and W298CE began carrying Bob FM, while "The Big Q" became an HD Radio and online-only format on KLCI/KDDG HD3.

Later in 2022, following the death of Daniel Peters, the D.M. Peters Family Trust sold WLKX-FM, KBGY, and the remaining 75 percent interest in KLCI/WQPM to Carpenter Broadcasting LLC for $2.2 million. The FCC approved the transaction in August 2022, and Carpenter closed on the purchase on September 15, 2022. FCCdata lists Carpenter Broadcasting LLC as the station's licensee and lists WLKX as a Class A facility with 6,000 watts ERP and 100 meters HAAT.
