= KYCR (AM) =

- Golden Valley, Minnesota; United States
- Broadcast area: Minneapolis-St. Paul
- Frequency: 1440 kHz
- Branding: The Biz AM 1440

Programming
- Format: Business journalism; Talk radio
- Affiliations: Bloomberg Radio; SRN News

Ownership
- Owner: Salem Media Group; (Salem Communications Holding Corporation)
- Sister stations: KDIZ; KKMS; WWTC

History
- First air date: May 1948 (78 years ago)
- Former call signs: KEYD (1948–1956); KEVE (1956–1964); KQRS (1964–1982); KGLD (1982–1984); KQRS (1984–1996); KDIZ (1996–2015)
- Call sign meaning: "Your Christian Radio" (former format of 1570 AM)

Technical information
- Licensing authority: FCC
- Facility ID: 35504
- Class: B
- Power: 5,000 watts (day); 500 watts (night)
- Transmitter coordinates: 44°59′19.9″N 93°21′6.8″W

Links
- Public license information: Public file; LMS
- Webcast: Listen live
- Website: www.twincitiesbusinessradio.com

KYCR (1440 kHz) is an AM radio station serving the Minneapolis-St. Paul metropolitan area. It is owned by Salem Media Group, and is carrying a business radio format.

KYCR's studios are located in Eagan, while its transmitter is located in Golden Valley.

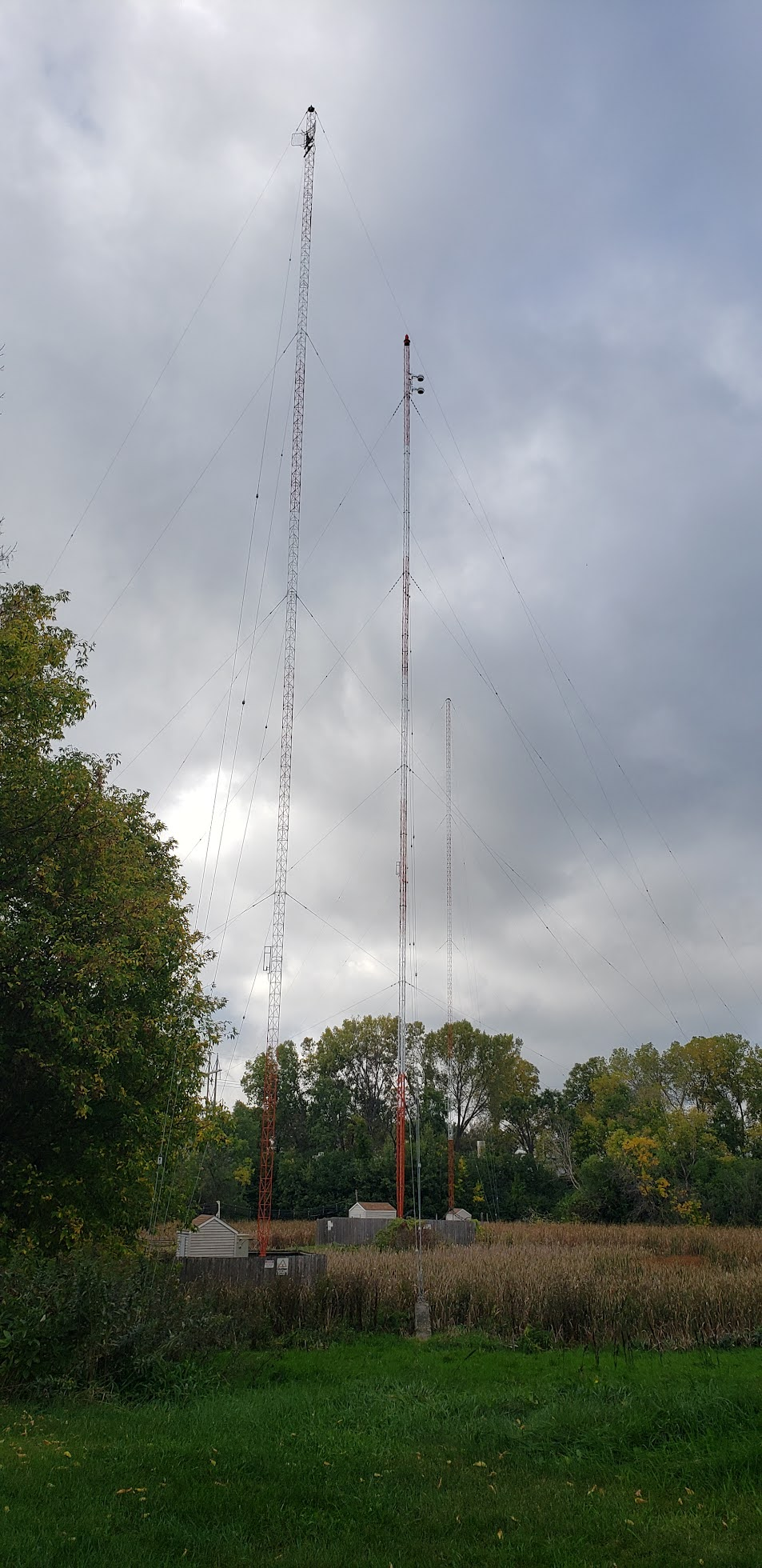
Radio towers for KYCR 1440 shared with KDIZ 1570.

== History ==
The original call letters were KEYD and the station played country music for many years. The station was launched in May 1948 by former management and advertisers of WDGY, who had become disenchanted with the owners of that station over the discontinuance of religious programming. Family Broadcasting basically started the station as a new home for the spurned WDGY programming. KEYD got a sister TV station in 1955, KEYD-TV (now KMSP-TV), and the two stations were co-owned by Family Broadcasting until mid-1956. The original KEYD radio studios were located in downtown Minneapolis on 9th Street off of Hennepin Avenue adjacent to the Orpheum Theatre. According to the 1955 Broadcasting Yearbook, both the AM and TV stations were co-located in the Foshay Tower.

The call sign was changed to KEVE in June 1956, and the studios moved to the station's transmitter and antenna site at 917 Lilac Drive in Golden Valley. During that time, the station played country music. KEVE-FM (92.5 FM) signed on September 1, 1962, and by October 1963, it was given the call letters KADM to match its AM sister as the pair became known as "Adam and Eve in the Valley"; the city of license for the two stations is the suburb of Golden Valley. A gradual shift from country music to a mix of classical music, show tunes and adult standards began in 1960, and was completed on both stations by March 1963. On December 1, 1964, the call letters for both stations became KQRS for "Quality Radio Stations".

In 1967, the stations began experimenting with freeform rock music from midnight to 5 am every night via the "Night Watch" program, playing R&B, jazz and psychedelic rock. The foray proved successful, and by the end of 1968, it became the full-time format.

The two KQs were a simulcast until 1982, when the AM briefly switched to an oldies format as KGLD before returning to the simulcast. The KGLD calls became effective November 22, 1982, with the KQRS calls returning on March 28, 1984.

In 1985, ABC Radio Network, then a division of the original ABC, Inc. bought the station and its FM counterpart with it from Hudson Communications Corporation, a radio broadcasting company owned by Washington D.C. lawyer Joe McKenna, which owned the station from 1956 to 1985. Along with its FM sister, the acquisition was ABC's first foray into Minnesota broadcasting.

The station again broke away from the simulcast on November 18, 1996, at 4 am, this time permanently, when it became one of the first four affiliates of the new Radio Disney with a children's/contemporary hit radio format that competed with WWTC, then the flagship station of "Radio AAHS", which had its own children's format. The station's call letters changed to KDIZ on November 15.

Disney had been collaborating with Radio AAHS, which was based in Minneapolis and had launched its children's format in 1990. Radio Aahs had grown to approximately 30 affiliate stations around the country. Disney withdrew from the Aahs contract and began competing against Aahs with Radio Disney. Children's Broadcasting Corp. sued Disney and was awarded $9.5 million in 2002. Disney appealed, and after the court upheld the judgement, it was paid in 2005; with accumulated interest, the total was $12.4 million.

On November 12, 2005, the station made world news when a riot erupted at its "Jingle Jam Concert" featuring B5, forcing the venue, Brookdale Mall, to be closed. Members of the group were stripped of shirts, shoes and earrings.

On August 13, 2014, Disney put KDIZ and 22 other Radio Disney stations up for sale, in order to focus more on digital distribution of the Radio Disney network. KDIZ held the distinction of being not only the longest-tenured Radio Disney station in its history, but also one of ABC's longest-tenured non-mainstream radio stations in its history. It was also the last-remaining Disney/ABC broadcast property in Minnesota, having had sold the others in 2007, with ABC Radio going to Citadel Broadcasting (KXXR, acquired in 1993, Love 105, acquired in 1997, and KQRS-FM, acquired in 1985).

Logo as The Wall Street Business Network from 2015 to 2021

On September 15, 2015, it was announced that Salem Media Group acquired the last five Radio Disney owned-and-operated stations for sale (including KDIZ) for $2.225 million. KDIZ was acquired through Common Ground Broadcasting, Inc., for $375.000. Salem put a business news/talk format, which moved from KYCR (1570 AM) on the station in December, after a brief period of silence beginning on December 11, 2015. The format features Dave Ramsey and other business-talk oriented shows. The sale of KDIZ was completed on December 15. The station changed its callsign to KYCR on December 24. On January 29, 2021, KYCR rebranded as "The Biz AM 1440".
