= KSTP =

KSTP may refer to:

- KSTP (AM), a radio station (1500 AM) licensed to St. Paul, Minnesota, United States
- KSTP-FM, a radio station (94.5 FM) licensed to St. Paul, Minnesota, United States
- KSTP-TV, a television station (virtual channel 5 / RF digital channel 35) licensed to St. Paul, Minnesota, United States
- KSTP, the ICAO airport code for the St. Paul Downtown Airport in St. Paul, Minnesota, United States
