= Telefarm Towers =

Radio and television broadcasting site in Minnesota

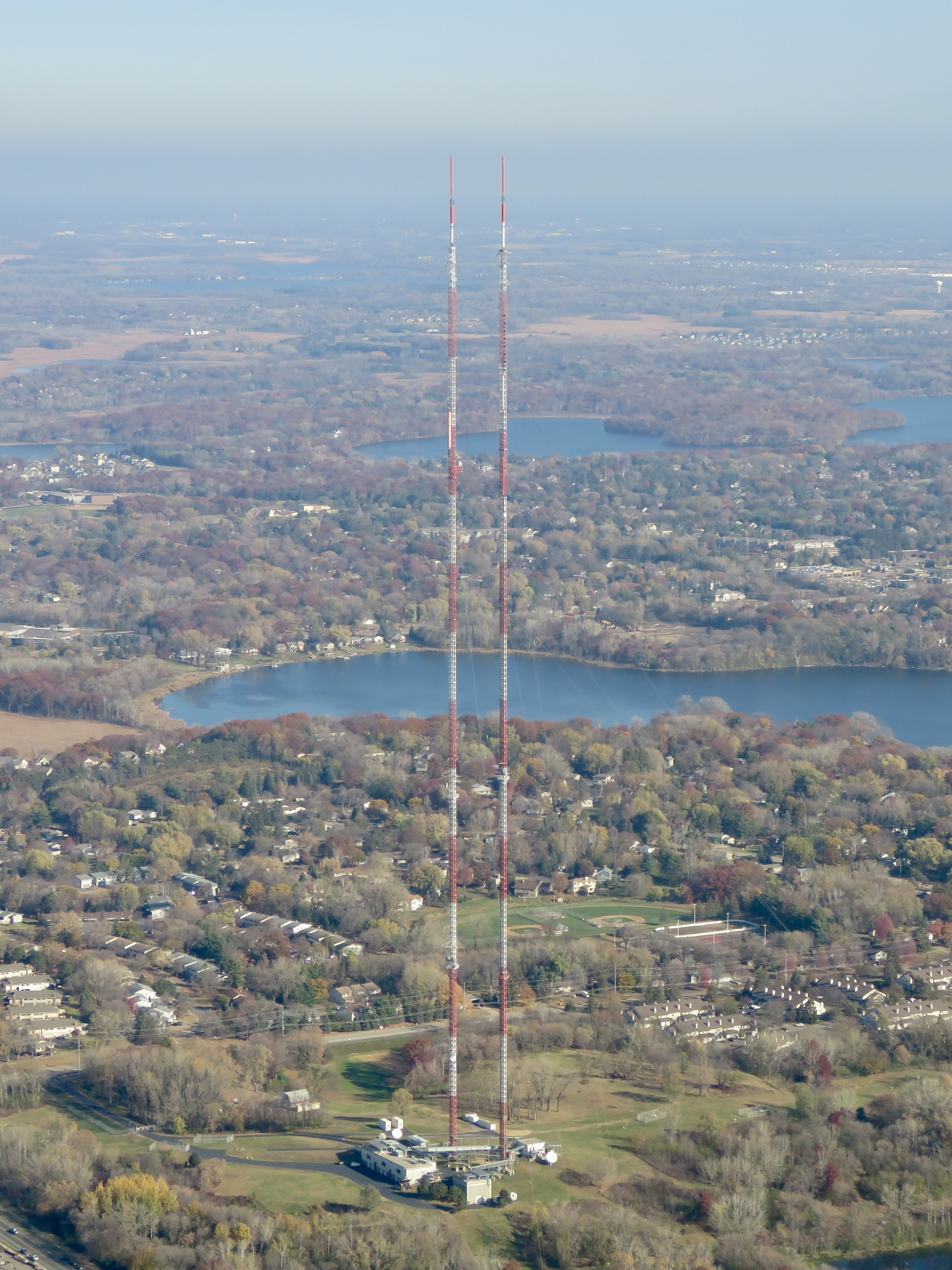
- Both masts from the air (pictured in 2024)

- Location within Minnesota

General information
- Type: TV & Radio transmission towers
- Location: Shoreview, Ramsey County, Minnesota, U.S.
- Coordinates: North mast: 45°03′44.7″N 93°08′22.0″W, South mast: 45°03′43.7″N 93°08′22.0″W
- Owner: Telefarm, Inc.

Height
- Height: North Mast: (1,394 feet (425 m)), South Mast: (1,361 feet (415 m))

The Telefarm Towers is a transmission site for FM radio and television broadcasting in Shoreview, Minnesota consisting of two guyed towers.

The towers, called Shoreview Towers by local residents, are owned by Telefarm, Inc., a joint venture of Twin Cities broadcasters CBS Television Stations (WCCO channel 4), Hubbard Broadcasting (KSTP channel 5, KSTC channel 5.2, KSTP-FM 94.5 FM, and KTMY 107.1 FM), and Nexstar Media Group (KARE channel 11) for the transmission of digital television and FM radio throughout the Greater Twin Cities. Along with Sinclair Broadcast Group's WUCW (channel 23), Minnesota Public Radio flagship station KNOW-FM (91.1 MHz) are additional tenants on the tower.

== History ==
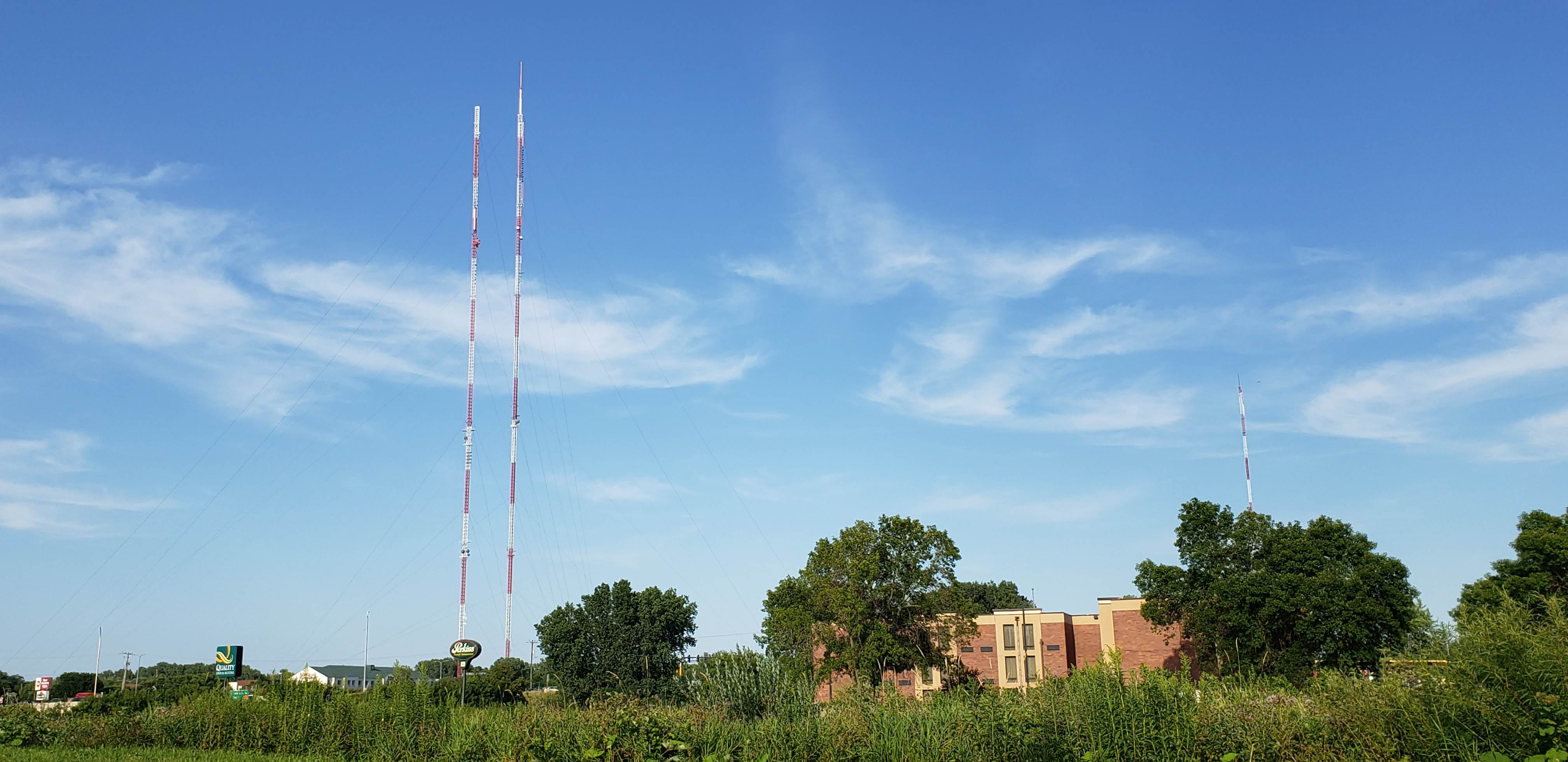
The Telefarm Tower complex (left) and KMSP Tower (right)

The towers were built in the 1970s for analog television, and were replacements for a single "candelabra" style tower that collapsed prior to completion in 1971, killing six workers on the tower and one on the ground.

The towers were upgraded at the turn of the century to support digital TV transmitters to meet Federal Communications Commission requirements. Because each antenna assembly weighs many tons, the towers had to be strengthened. Work took longer than expected, and KSTP notably used its original broadcast tower along University Avenue in Saint Paul, Minnesota for digital transmission for about a year starting in late 1999 before construction was finished.

Digital television upgrades to the South facility were completed in 2000 and the North facility was finished in 2001.

During the summer of 2019, an antenna section on the north tower was removed. Television station KSTC moved to RF channel 30, from its previous channel of 45. This was due to the spectrum reallocation of the late 2010s. This move was completed by early September. On October 4, 2021, the new transmitter was installed on the north tower.

== FM ==
FM radio stations
Frequency	Call sign	Name	Format	Owner
91.1; 91.1 HD-2; 91.1 HD-3	KNOW	MPR News; Radio Heartland; BBC World Service	News/Talk; Folk Music; News/Talk	Minnesota Public Radio
94.5; 94.5 HD-2	KSTP	KS95; Skor North	Hot AC; Sports	Hubbard Broadcasting
107.1; 107.1 HD-2; 107.1 HD-3	KTMY	myTalk 107.1; 74 WDGY; The Power Loon	Female-Oriented Talk; Oldies; Classic rock	Hubbard Broadcasting

== Television ==
Channel	Callsign	Affiliation	Branding	Subchannels		Owner
(Virtual)	Callsign	Affiliation	Branding	Channel	Programming	Owner
32 (4.1)	WCCO-TV	CBS	CBS Minnesota	4.2; 4.3; 4.4; 23.3; 23.4	Start TV; Dabl; Fave TV; Charge! (WUCW); Roar (WUCW)	CBS News and Stations
35 (5.1)	KSTP-TV	ABC	5 Eyewitness News	5.5; 5.7; 23.1	Traffic cameras Heroes & Icons; The CW (WUCW)	Hubbard Broadcasting
30 (5.2)	KSTC-TV	Independent	45 TV	5.3; 5.4; 5.6	MeTV; Get TV; MeTV Toons	Hubbard Broadcasting
31 (11.1)	KARE	NBC	KARE 11	11.2; 11.3; 11.4; 11.5; 11.7; 11.8; 23.5	Quest; True Crime Network (blank); The Nest; Confess; HSN; Rewind TV (WUCW)	Nexstar Media Group
22 (23.1)	WUCW (ATSC 3 Lighthouse)	CW	The Twin Cities CW	4.1; 5.1; 9.1; 11.1	CBS (WCCO); ABC (KSTP); FOX (KMSP); NBC (KARE)	Sinclair Inc.

== See also ==
- KMSP Tower - Another major tower in Shoreview.
- List of tallest structures
