= KLIZ =

KLIZ may refer to:

- KLIZ (AM), a radio station (1380 AM) licensed to Brainerd, Minnesota, United States
- KLIZ-FM, a radio station (107.5 FM) licensed to Brainerd, Minnesota, United States
- ICAO code of Loring Air Force Base
- Old High German equivalent of Glitnir
