= WFMP =

WFMP may refer to:

- WFMP-LP, a low-power radio station (106.5 FM) licensed to serve Louisville, Kentucky, United States
- KTMY, a radio station (107.1 FM) licensed to serve Coon Rapids, Minnesota, United States, which held the call sign WFMP from 2002 to 2010
