= KVBM =

KVBM may refer to:

- KVBM-LP, a low-power radio station (104.7 FM) licensed to serve Killeen, Texas, United States
- KSTC-TV, a television station (channel 30, virtual 5) licensed to serve Minneapolis, Minnesota, United States, which held the call sign KVBM from 1994 to 2000
