= KVBR =

Simulcasts KTMY, Coon Rapids, MN
- Brainerd, Minnesota; United States
- Broadcast area: Brainerd Lakes area
- Frequency: 1340 kHz
- Branding: MyTalk 1340 AM & 95.1 FM

Programming
- Format: Entertainment talk
- Affiliations: ABC News Radio

Ownership
- Owner: Hubbard Broadcasting, Inc.; (HBI Radio Brainerd/Wadena, LLC)
- Sister stations: KBLB, KLIZ, KLIZ-FM, KUAL-FM, WJJY-FM

History
- First air date: May 16, 1964
- Former call signs: KVBR (1964–1982); KQBR (1982–1986)
- Call sign meaning: Voice of Brainerd

Technical information
- Licensing authority: FCC
- Facility ID: 60496
- Class: C
- Power: 1,000 watts
- Transmitter coordinates: 46°20′51.00″N 94°10′52.00″W
- Translator: 95.1 W236DF (Brainerd)

Links
- Public license information: Public file; LMS
- Website: www.kvbr.com

KVBR (1340 AM, "MyTalk 1340 AM and 95.1 FM") is a commercial radio station broadcasting an entertainment talk format. Licensed to Brainerd, Minnesota, United States, the station serves the Brainerd Lakes area. Founded in 1964 by the Persons family, the station is owned by Hubbard Broadcasting, Inc., and features programming from ABC News Radio. KVBR is also relayed over low-power FM translator W236DF (95.1 FM).

== History ==
Former logo

KVBR first went on the air on May 16, 1965, licensed to Greater Minnesota Broadcasting Corporation, Charlie Persons, president. The station changed its call sign from KVBR to KQBR on November 15, 1982, when the station was purchased by Jim and Larry Lakoduk of Fargo, North Dakota. The Lakoduks also owned KQWB AM-FM in Fargo and WEBC in Duluth, Minnesota. The station format was changed to full service country with the image "1340 Q-Country" under General Manager Chuck Whittman. The air staff for KQBR included Bob Randall (PD), Don Kelley (news), Barbara Ann, Don Jahnke, Charlie Kampa, Steve Sedall, H.P Thomas, Chuck Sargent, Dave Torkelson, Ken Adams and Jeff Butler.

On August 15, 1986, the station returned its call sign to KVBR when the Lakoduks sold the station back to station founder Charlie Persons. The Persons family operated the station on a smaller scale than the Lakoduks, focusing on a news/talk format. Persons sold the station, as well as an FM construction permit, to Jim Ingstad's Sioux Valley Broadcasting, Inc., in March 1994. In April 1996, KVBR was sold to Kommerstad Communications Company, LLC. BL Broadcasting, Inc., a unit of Omni Broadcasting, acquired KVBR in January 2004, operating from studios located in Baxter, Minnesota.

Hubbard Broadcasting announced on November 13, 2014, that it would purchase the Omni Broadcasting stations, including KVBR. The sale was completed on February 27, 2015, at a purchase price of $8 million for the 16 stations and one translator.
