= Steve Patterson (TV and radio host) =

American TV and radio host

- Education: Degree in Communication Studies
- Alma mater: Azusa Pacific University
- Occupations: TV and radio host
- Known for: Hosting Twin Cities Live on KSTP-TV, Host of "Donna & Steve" radio show and podcast, Appearances on ABC's Live with Kelly & Mark

Steve Patterson is an American TV and radio host based in Minneapolis–Saint Paul, Minnesota.

== Career ==
From 2014 to 2021, Patterson served as a co-host of Twin Cities Live, a local afternoon talk show broadcast on KSTP-TV (Channel 5), the Minneapolis–Saint Paul ABC affiliate. He hosted the program alongside Elizabeth Ries, who continues to lead the show.

Patterson made his first appearance on ABC’s Live with Kelly & Michael in 2015, alongside Kelly Ripa and Michael Strahan. Over the years, he has had regular appearances through Ripa’s tenure with Ryan Seacrest (Live with Kelly & Ryan) and currently alongside her husband, Mark Consuelos (Live with Kelly & Mark). In addition to his recurring correspondent and feature segments, Patterson has occasionally stepped into the co-host chair alongside Ripa, filling in for her regular on-air partner.

In 2018, Patterson began co-hosting the weekday radio show Donna & Steve alongside Donna Valentine on Minneapolis-Saint Paul station myTalk 107.1 (KTMY). Airing weekdays from 9:00 a.m. to 12:00 p.m. CT, the program focuses on entertainment news, lifestyle, and pop culture. In addition to the live broadcast, the show is distributed digitally across major podcast platforms, both as full-length episodic replays and as curated clips featuring popular individual segments.

Patterson was previously a host on REELZ.

== Education and personal life ==
Patterson has a degree in Communication Studies with an emphasis in Media Studies from Azusa Pacific University in California.

Patterson is married to Lauren and they have 4 children together.
