= KBLB =

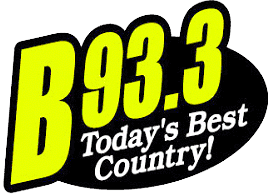
- Nisswa, Minnesota; United States
- Broadcast area: Brainerd, Minnesota; Brainerd Lakes area
- Frequency: 93.3 MHz
- Branding: B-93.3

Programming
- Format: Country music
- Affiliations: Premiere Networks; Westwood One

Ownership
- Owner: Hubbard Broadcasting, Inc.; (HBI Radio Brainerd/Wadena, LLC)
- Sister stations: KLIZ, KLIZ-FM, KUAL-FM, KVBR, WJJY-FM

History
- First air date: 2002
- Former call signs: KBPQ (1999–2002)
- Call sign meaning: BL Broadcasting (former owner)

Technical information
- Licensing authority: FCC
- Facility ID: 4337
- Class: C1
- ERP: 100,000 watts
- HAAT: 170 meters (560 ft)
- Transmitter coordinates: 46°26′34″N 94°22′55″W

Links
- Public license information: Public file; LMS
- Webcast: Listen live
- Website: Official website

KBLB (93.3 FM, "B93.3") is a radio station broadcasting a country music format. Licensed to Nisswa, Minnesota, United States, the station serves the Brainerd area. The station is owned by Hubbard Broadcasting, Inc. (through licensee HBI Radio Brainerd/Wadena, LLC) and features programming from Premiere Networks and Westwood One.

KBLB is a sister station to KVBR 1340 (Business News/Talk), KLIZ 1380 (Sports), KUAL-FM 103.5 (Oldies), WJJY-FM 106.7 (Adult Contemporary), and KLIZ-FM 107.5 (Classic Rock). All are located in a brand new modern broadcast facility located at 13225 Dogwood Drive, Baxter.

== History ==
The Federal Communications Commission issued a construction permit for the station to BDI Broadcasting, Inc. on August 5, 1999, and assigned it the call sign KBPQ. On December 11, 2000, BDI assigned the permit to BL Broadcasting (both companies were subsidiaries of Omni Broadcasting). On January 2, 2002, the station changed its call sign to the current KBLB. The station received its license to cover on March 28, 2002.

Hubbard Broadcasting announced on November 13, 2014, that it would purchase the Omni Broadcasting stations, including KBLB. The sale was completed on February 27, 2015, at a purchase price of $8 million for the 16 stations and one translator.
