= KSTP-TV =

Television station in Saint Paul, Minnesota

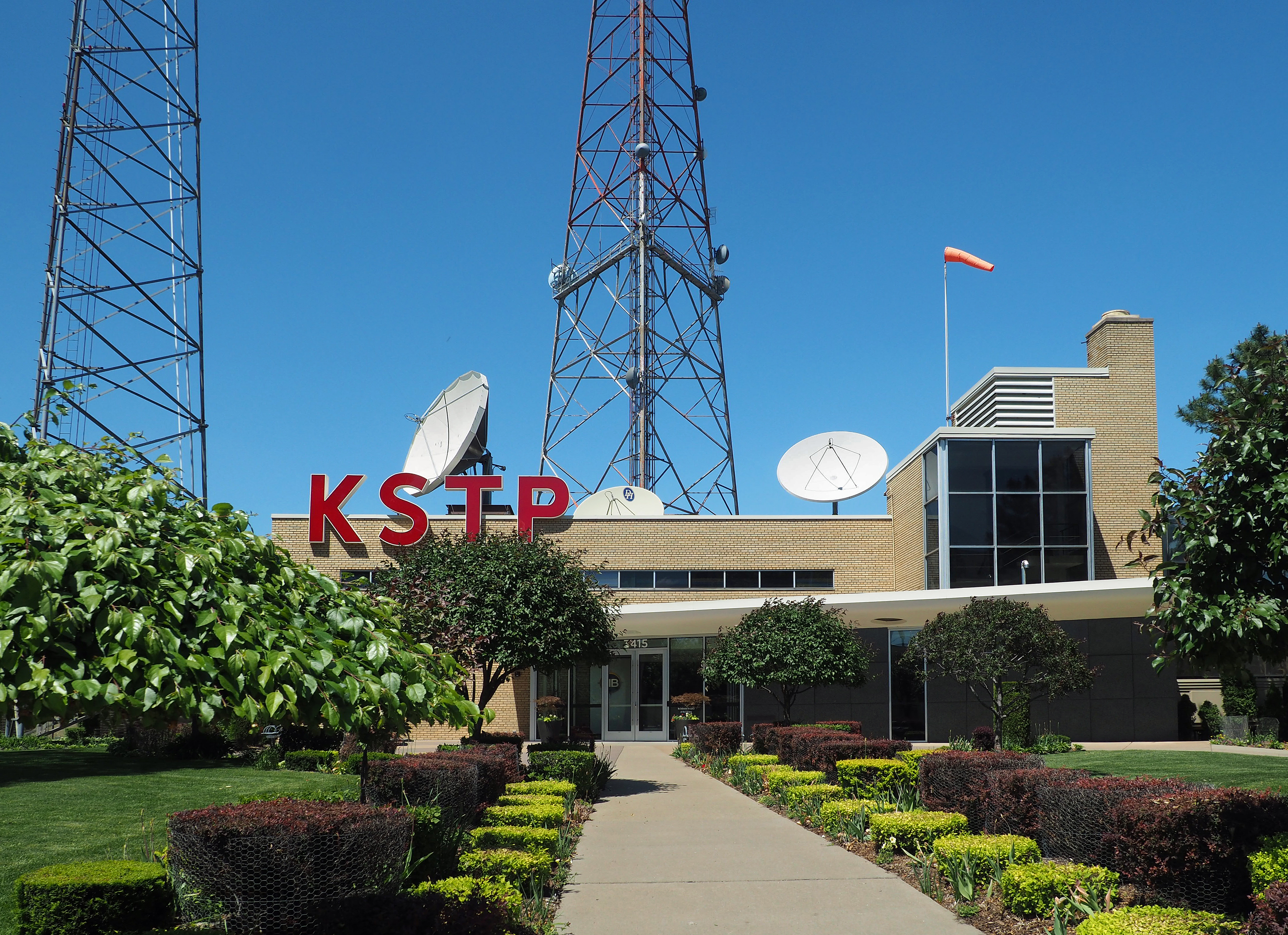
- Entrance to the KSTP studios on University Avenue in Minneapolis and Saint Paul, Minnesota in 2020. The sidewalk leading to the building lies precisely on the city and county line, as does the central leg of the tower.
- Saint Paul–Minneapolis, Minnesota; United States
- City: Saint Paul, Minnesota
- Channels: Digital: 35 (UHF); Virtual: 5
- Branding: Channel 5; 5 Eyewitness News

Programming
- Affiliations: 5.1: ABC; 5.5: Defy TV; 5.7: Heroes & Icons

Ownership
- Owner: Hubbard Broadcasting; (KSTP-TV, LLC)
- Sister stations: KSTC-TV, KSTP, KSTP-FM, KTMY

History
- Founded: May 1946
- First air date: April 27, 1948
- Former channel numbers: Analog: 5 (VHF, 1948–2009); Digital: 50 (UHF, 1999–2009)
- Former affiliations: NBC (1948–1979); DuMont (secondary, 1948–1956)
- Call sign meaning: Saint Paul (derived from sister station KSTP radio)

Technical information
- Licensing authority: FCC
- Facility ID: 28010
- ERP: 1,000 kW
- HAAT: 454 m (1,490 ft)
- Transmitter coordinates: 45°3′44″N 93°8′22″W
- Translator(s): see § Translators

Links
- Public license information: Public file; LMS
- Website: kstp.com

KSTP-TV (channel 5) is a television station licensed to Saint Paul, Minnesota, United States, serving the Twin Cities area as an affiliate of ABC. It is the flagship television property of locally based Hubbard Broadcasting, which has owned the station since its inception, and is sister to Minneapolis-licensed independent station KSTC-TV (channel 5.2) and radio stations KSTP (1500 AM), KSTP-FM (94.5), and KTMY (107.1 FM). The five outlets share studios on University Avenue, on the Saint Paul–Minneapolis border; KSTP-TV's transmitter is located at Telefarm Towers in Shoreview, Minnesota.

KSTP-TV operates two full-power satellite stations: KSAX (channel 42) in Alexandria (with transmitter near Westport), and KRWF (channel 43) in Redwood Falls (with transmitter near Vesta). KSTP-TV also serves as the default ABC affiliate for the Mankato market, as that area does not have an ABC affiliate of its own. The station's signal is also relayed in St. James, Minnesota, over translator K30FN-D, which also serves the Mankato market.

Nielsen Media Research treats KSTP-TV and its satellites as one station in local ratings books, using the identifier name KSTP+.

== History ==
=== Founding ===
Stanley E. Hubbard, founder of KSTP radio, was one of broadcasting's foremost pioneers. In June 1939, he purchased one of the first television cameras available from RCA and began experimenting with television, but the television blackout brought on by World War II prevented any transmissions from being made. The first telecast by KSTP-TV reportedly occurred on December 7, 1947, when Jack Horner hosted a 25-minute program. On April 27, 1948, KSTP-TV signed on as the first commercial television station in Minnesota, although an experimental mechanical television station had been set up by WDGY station engineers more than a decade earlier. That station's license expired in 1938 as the Federal Communications Commission (FCC) was not interested in continuing mechanical TV broadcasts.

=== National affiliation ===
KSTP-TV was originally an NBC affiliate, as KSTP radio had been an affiliate of the NBC Red Network since 1928. Channel 5 claims to have been the NBC television network's first affiliate located west of the Mississippi River; however, this distinction is actually held by KSD-TV (now KSDK) in St. Louis, which signed on one year earlier. (Also, both the studios and the transmitter are located east of the river.) It was part of NBC's Midwest Network, a regional group of NBC affiliates that fed programming in the days before the coaxial cable link to New York City. In 1961, due to its status as an NBC affiliate, it was the first television station not owned by a network to broadcast all of its local programs in color.

=== 1970s ===
In the mid-1970s, ABC—which had become the top-rated television network in the United States—began looking for stronger affiliates across the country. KMSP-TV (channel 9), the Twin Cities' ABC affiliate since 1961, had long struggled in the ratings. ABC had approached independent station WTCN-TV (channel 11, now KARE), CBS affiliate WCCO-TV (channel 4), and KSTP-TV to affiliate with the network. Channel 5 surprised the industry on August 29, 1978, by announcing its intention to sever ties with then third-place NBC after 30 years to join ABC. The affiliation switch occurred on March 5, 1979, and was ABC's biggest coup at the time; the NBC affiliation subsequently went to WTCN-TV that same day. One of the last prime time NBC programs to air on channel 5 was The Wonderful World of Disney; the first ABC program to air in general on the station was Good Morning America, as announced by then-news anchor Tom Ryther. Later on, the first prime time ABC program to air on the station was a first-run episode of the short-lived series, Salvage 1. "We want to go into the 1980s in a leadership position with a network which we think has the management, team and depth to be the best. That's ABC. We're just absolutely thrilled," said KSTP's Stanley S. Hubbard, son of station founder Stanley E. Hubbard.

=== 2000s ===
In 2000, Hubbard Broadcasting purchased independent station KVBM-TV (channel 45; now KSTC), creating Minnesota's first commercial television station duopoly (though there is a longstanding public television duopoly: KTCA/KTCI).

== Logo ==
KSTP-TV has used its "groovy 5" logo or variations on it since April 1969—it is the longest-used station logo in the Upper Midwest. By 1982, the design contained a white '5' on a red rounded edge square background. The number was italicized for a time in the mid-to-late 1980s. In the early 1990s, the logo endured a more dramatic makeover, with a gold colored '5' on a blue ABC-style disc (with either the call letters or the Eyewitness News name imprinted upon it), with the center colored in green. By the late 1990s, a brighter logo—still with a gold '5'—returned to the rectangular look, adding a black ABC logo. In the 2000s through mid-2010s, a white '5' was used on a red parallelogram, also featuring the ABC logo. On November 30, 2014, the logo was redesigned, and now features the "groovy 5" logo in blue with red lines circling the left part of the logo, with the ABC logo again. On March 22, 2021, the logo got its current redesign, putting a white 5 inside a red "app" shaped square with rounded corners (an updated version of the 1982–1986 logo), similar to the logo used in the 2000s. An updated graphics and music package debuted on the same day.

== Broadcast center ==
KSTP-TV's studios and offices—also serving as the corporate offices of Hubbard Broadcasting and, from 1989 to 2002, the studios of sister operation All News Channel—are located at 3415 University Avenue, precisely on the Minneapolis–St. Paul boundary. The sidewalk in the adjacent photo of the building is on the city line. The principal production facilities, including the news studio, are on the Minneapolis side of the building. However, the station has a St. Paul mailing address (55114-2099) and telephone number (area code 651) because its business and advertising offices are on the St. Paul side. The large 594-foot-tall (181 m) freestanding transmitting tower, which was amongst the tallest in the country when completed in 1948, has one leg in each city, with the third leg precisely on the city line. This tower is primarily used as a studio transmitter link relaying the signals for both KSTP-TV and KSTP-FM to the Telefarm paired tower setup in Shoreview (shared with KSTP-FM, WCCO-TV, KARE, and WUCW), along with backup transmitter facilities in case of failure at Shoreview. The tower also houses the transmitter for KEC65, the NOAA Weather Radio station serving the Twin Cities area.

== Programming ==
KSTP clears most ABC network programming. In the late 1970s, KSTP was the base for Country Day, a half-hour weekday agricultural news program that aired on a "network" of stations in Minnesota, Wisconsin, Iowa, North Dakota, and South Dakota. Steve Edstrom was the main host. From 1982 to 1994, when nationally syndicated talk shows started ruling the daytime airwaves, KSTP ran a talk program of its own called Good Company, that was hosted by married couple Sharon Anderson and Steve Edelman. Both of them had appeared briefly in the movie Fargo as TV hosts, and continue to be recognized as area celebrities from time to time. Currently, Edelman runs Edelman Productions, a company that produces series for Food Network, HGTV, History and DIY Network, with his wife Anderson hosting a few of them. Edelman Productions is headquartered in California where both Edelman and Anderson now live, but it has offices both in California and Minnesota, where they produce their shows.

In 2007, KSTP decided to bring back an hour-long afternoon talk program similar to Good Company. Twin Cities Live, described as "a show about Minnesotans created by Minnesotans", began airing on April 21, 2008, and airs weekdays at 3 p.m. A public casting call at the Mall of America attracted a Burnsville, Minnesota native, John Hanson, who was selected from over 500 people. A few months later, former Milwaukee news anchor Rebekah Wood was hired as his partner. Wood was replaced by Elizabeth Ries on June 15, 2009. Ries and Hanson co-hosted together for over three years until Hanson received an offer to become the program director of KCSP in Kansas City. Hanson's last day on Twin Cities Live was December 21, 2012. Over the next four months, numerous television personalities served as guest co-hosts on TCL until the producers could find the best fit. KSTP weekend anchor Chris Egert was chosen to be Ries' new co-host on April 29, 2013. Egert and Ries co-hosted the show for nine months until Egert was promoted to weekday morning news anchor in February 2014. The station again had to go through a process of finding the next co-host, this time taking five months. On July 21, 2014, Steve Patterson was named the new co-host of TCL. Ries is the current host of Twin Cities Live. On April 16, 2018, close to ten years after the program first hit the airwaves, Twin Cities Live was expanded to 90 minutes to include an extra half-hour at 4 p.m. called Twin Cities Live at Four, also hosted by Patterson and Ries. The extra half-hour replaced Who Wants to Be a Millionaire (which was canceled in May 2019) which was moved to 2 p.m. Patterson left Twin Cities Live in 2021.

The title Twin Cities Live was first used from 1985 to 1991 for a short-lived morning talk show that debuted at a time when KSTP was trying to reinvent its news image. The other talk show that aired on KSTP-TV is Live with Kelly and Ryan, which was on KSTP for 33 years beginning in the late 1980s under prior hosts Kathie Lee Gifford and Regis Philbin and ending in 2021, when it moved to KARE.

During the trial of Derek Chauvin, KSTP launched a digital subchannel showing the court feed without commentary.

=== News operation ===
KSTP-TV presently broadcasts 37 hours of locally produced newscasts each week (with six hours each weekday and 3 1/2 hours each on Saturdays and Sundays). In addition, the station produces a political discussion show called At Issue, which is hosted by Tom Hauser, and Sports Wrap, a sports highlight program that airs on Sunday evenings at 10:45 p.m. and on special occasions, such as when KSTP airs ESPN Monday Night Football telecasts featuring the Minnesota Vikings, or the final game of the NBA Finals. The station formerly ran a Friday night edition of the program focusing on high school sports that aired from September through May. These segments were usually hosted by Rod Simons and Anne Hutchinson, but Simons was later fired by the station in 2008 and Hutchinson also was let go in December of that year. A week prior to Hutchinson's departure, High School Sports Wrap was canceled due to low revenues. For much of the time since the 1980s, KQRS-FM morning show host Tom Barnard has served as the station's voice-over announcer.

A longtime trademark of the station is the use of the letter "V" in Morse code (standing for 'victory') as a sonic identity, a hallmark of Stanley E. Hubbard's operation of the KSTP stations since World War II, when he held an interest in teaching Morse code to his listening audience.

For a time in the early 1990s, KSTP aired overnight news under the banner of Eyewitness News All Night, featuring half-hour local news blocks, alternating with blocks of content from the Hubbard-owned All News Channel (which originated from KSTP's facilities and utilized the station's on-air personalities).

The station ran advertisements in 2005 featuring Ed Asner (emulating Lou Grant).

Meteorologist Dave Dahl was hired in 1977, began doing on-air weather reporting in 1979, and was named chief meteorologist in 1986. Dahl denies global warming and states that the earth has been stable or cooling for the last two decades. Dave Dahl retired at the end of 2020.

Joe Schmit was a sports reporter and later sports director from 1985, until switching to news anchor in 2005; Schmit left the station in June 2006 to join Petters Media and Marketing Group. After the collapse of the company and the arrest and conviction of founder Tom Petters, Schmit returned to KSTP-TV on January 14, 2010.

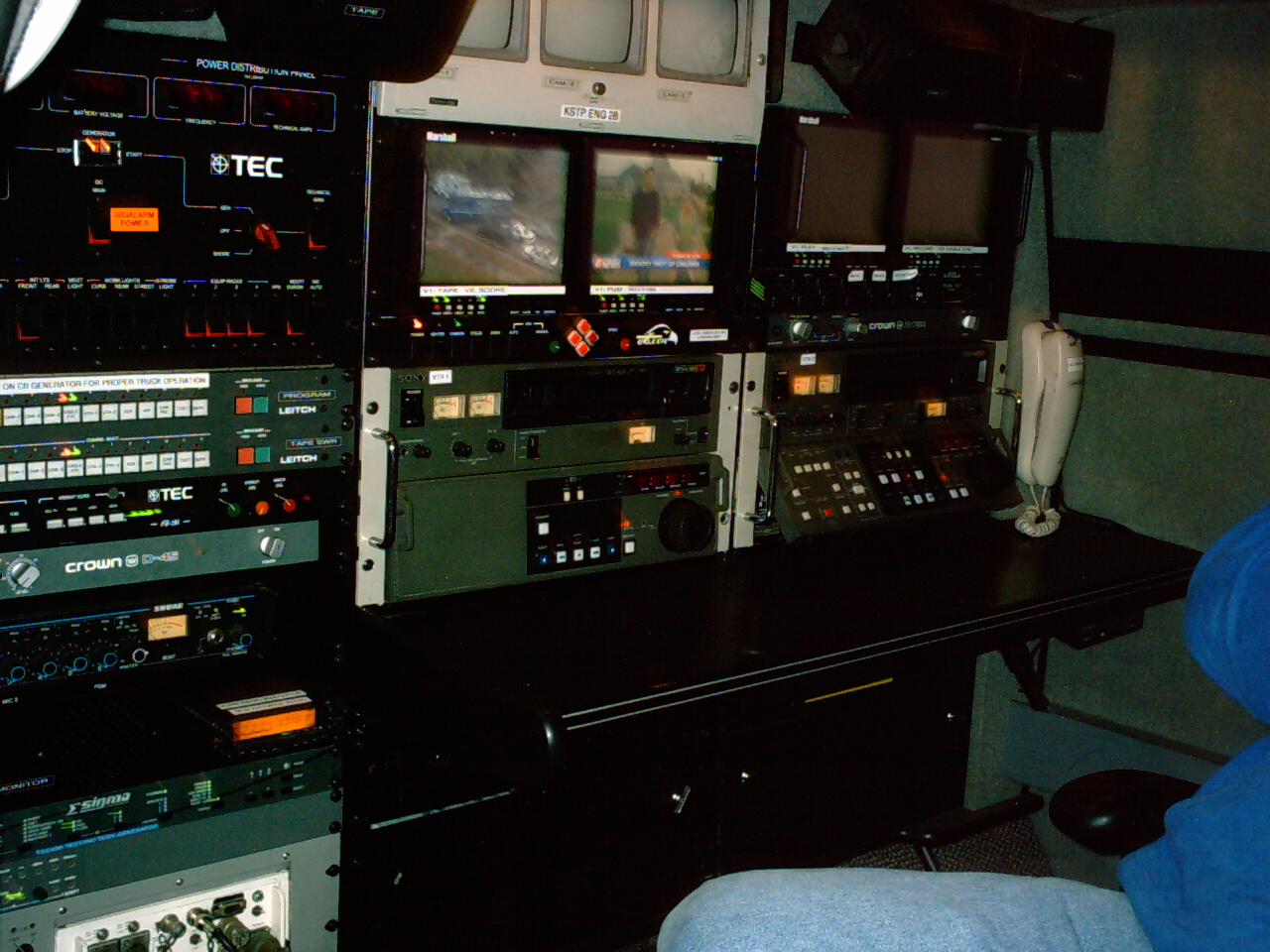
Equipment inside a KSTP-TV news van.

On May 12, 2006, KSTP debuted a half-hour newscast at 4 p.m. On September 10, 2007, it was moved to 4:30 p.m., serving as a lead-in to the 5 p.m. newscast. For the first year, KSTP began to have news competition in that timeslot, when KARE debuted an online/television lifestyle program at 4 p.m. in May 2007. KSTP began broadcasting its newscasts in high-definition on June 14, 2009, the first Hubbard-owned station and also, the last major network station in the Twin Cities to do so (KMSP and WCCO had already transitioned their local newscasts to HD the previous month, on May 11 and 28, respectively). On August 30, 2010, KSTP expanded its weekday morning newscast a half-hour earlier, now running from 4:30 to 7 a.m.

==== Notable former on-air staff ====
- Ron Magers – anchor (1974–1981)
- Frank Somerville – anchor
- Stan Turner – anchor (1968–1989)

== Technical information ==
=== Subchannels ===
The signal of KSTP-TV contains four subchannels, while KSTC-TV's signal contains five. KSTP hosts the ATSC 1.0 signal of CW affiliate WUCW (channel 23) through an agreement with Sinclair Broadcast Group. Through the use of virtual channels, KSTC-TV's subchannels are associated with channel 5.

Subchannels of KSTP-TV and KSTC-TV
| Subchannel | Station | Res. | Short name | Programming |
|---|---|---|---|---|
| 5.1 | KSTP-TV | 720p | KSTPDT | ABC |
| 5.2 | KSTC-TV | 720p | 45TV | Independent |
| 5.3 | KSTC-TV | 480i | MeTV | MeTV |
| 5.4 | KSTC-TV | 480i | GetTV | Great |
| 5.5 | KSTC-TV | 720p | KSTCCam | Traffic cameras |
| 5.6 | KSTC-TV | 480i | MeTOONS | MeTV Toons |
| 5.7 | KSTP-TV | 480i | H & I | Heroes & Icons |
| 5.8 | KSTP-TV | 480i | IonPlus | Ion Plus |
| 23.1 | KSTP-TV | 1080i | The CW | The CW (WUCW) |

Broadcast on behalf of another station

Subchannels of KSAX and KRWF
| Subchannel | | Res. | Short name | | Programming |
| KSAX | KRWF | Res. | KSAX | KRWF | Programming |
|---|---|---|---|---|---|
| 42.1 | 43.1 | 720p | KSAX-DT | KRWF-DT | ABC (KSTP-TV) |
| 42.2 | 43.2 | 720p | KSAXDT2 | KRWFDT2 | KSTC-TV (Independent) (Note: 480i on KRWF-DT2) |
| 42.3 | 43.3 | 480i | KSAXDT3 | KRWFDT3 | MeTV (KSTC-TV) |
| 42.5 | 43.5 | 720p | KSAXCam | KRWFCam | Traffic cameras (KSTC-TV) |

=== Analog-to-digital conversion ===
KSTP-TV signed on its digital television signal in 1999. The station ended regular programming on its analog signal, over VHF channel 5, on June 12, 2009, the official date on which full-power television stations in the United States transitioned from analog to digital broadcasts under federal mandate. The station moved its digital signal from its pre-transition UHF channel 50 to channel 35, using virtual channel 5.

The station participated in the "Analog Nightlight" program until its analog transmitter was turned off for good on July 12, 2009.

== Satellite stations and translators ==
=== Satellites ===
KSTP-TV operates two satellite stations northwest of the Twin Cities area. These two stations carry KSTP on their DT1 signal, KSTC on DT2, and MeTV on DT3, leaving the other four subchannel services exclusive to the Twin Cities.

| Station | City of license | Channels (RF / VC) | Licensee | First air date | Callsign meaning | ERP | HAAT | Transmitter coordinates | Facility ID | Public license information |
|---|---|---|---|---|---|---|---|---|---|---|
| KSAX | Alexandria | 24 (UHF); 42 | KSAX-TV, Inc. | September 15, 1987 | KSTP for Alexandria | 55.3 kW | 361 m (1,184 ft) | 45°41′59″N 95°10′36″W | 35584 | Public file LMS |
| KRWF | Redwood Falls | 27 (UHF); 43 | KSAX-TV, Inc. | April 14, 1987 | Redwood Falls | 58 kW | 151 m (495 ft) | 44°29′3″N 95°29′28″W | 35585 | Public file LMS |

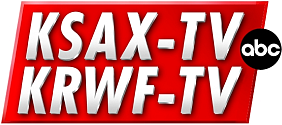
Former KSAX/KRWF logo

KSAX's schedule was virtually identical to that of KSTP-TV, though it aired separate identifications and commercials. It also placed local inserts into KSTP's weeknight broadcasts. KRWF was a full-time repeater of KSAX. Expanding their operations in 1999, the stations hired their first meteorologist. This continued in 2004 with the launch of a half-hour high school sports highlight show. The stations have won numerous broadcast journalism awards from various broadcaster associations. On June 25, 2012, Hubbard Broadcasting shut down KSAX/KRWF's local operations, converting the two stations into full-time satellites of KSTP-TV outside of occasional local advertising and community calendar notices.

=== Translators ===
In addition, KSTP-TV's signal is further extended by way of twelve translators in central and southern Minnesota. Seven of them nominally repeat KSAX and are part of that station's license.

- K18DG-D Alexandria (translates KSAX)
- K17NW-D Alexandria (translates KSTC-TV)
- K28DD-D Bemidji (translates KSAX)
- K16BQ-D Brainerd (translates KSAX)
- K14KD-D Frost (translates KSTP-TV)
- K34NV-D Frost (translates KSTC-TV)
- K17MY-D Jackson (translates KSTP-TV)
- K29LV-D Jackson (translates KSTC-TV)
- K21NS-D Olivia (translates KSTP-TV)
- K31OR-D Olivia (translates KSTC-TV)
- K32FY-D Park Rapids (translates KSAX)
- K35NY-D Redwood Falls (translates KSTP-TV)
- K28LL-D Redwood Falls (translates KSTC-TV)
- K30FN-D St. James^{1} (translates KSTP-TV)
- K14KE-D St. James^{1} (translates KSTC-TV)
- K17FE-D Wadena (translates KSAX)
- K21HX-D Walker (translates KSAX)
- K35KH-D Walker (translates KSTC-TV)
- K19IH-D Willmar (translates KSAX)

^{1}Translator is in the Mankato market.

== Carriage in Canada ==
On September 11, 2014, KSTP-TV filed a complaint with the Canadian Radio-television and Telecommunications Commission (CRTC) regarding its carriage in Canada and simultaneous substitution (simsubbing), as well as notifying the CRTC of viewer complaints of problems with closed captioning and poorly-timed simsubbing on its cable feed in Canada. In particular, KSTP is stating it is authorized for broadcast by the FCC, and not the CRTC, and is concerned that it may not have the appropriate broadcast rights for viewing in Canada. Hubbard Broadcasting, the owners of KSTP-TV, also argued concerns about their video feed being modified for Canadian viewers via simsubbing, removal of its closed-captioning information (a Broadcast Act violation, if proven), not having its digital subchannels carried as well, and that this might be a potential Copyright Act of Canada violation for its programming to air in Canada. Similar to other American stations, KSTP has also asked for compensation for its carriage in Canada or to have its unauthorized coverage cease, as it was never asked for permission to be relayed on cable services in Canada. The CRTC ultimately ruled against KSTP-TV on September 16, 2014, regarding their request to be removed from the CRTC's list of stations eligible for carriage in Canada, a fear that was shared by Shaw Media (owners of Shaw Direct/Shaw Cable/CANCOM) and Thunder Bay MP Bruce Hyer. A secondary concern posed by Shaw Media was that KSTP-TV would try to ask for fee-for-carriage in a cross-border retransmission consent agreement, which does not currently exist under the Copyright Act of Canada, and as the CRTC explained, is outside the scope of the Broadcast Act of 1968 or its regulatory responsibilities.

== See also ==
- KAAL
- WDIO-DT / WIRT-DT
