= KUAL-FM =

- Brainerd, Minnesota; United States
- Broadcast area: Brainerd micropolitan area
- Frequency: 103.5 MHz
- Branding: Cool 103.5

Programming
- Format: Oldies; classic hits
- Affiliations: ABC News Radio; Compass Media Networks; Premiere Networks; Westwood One; Minnesota Twins

Ownership
- Owner: Hubbard Broadcasting, Inc.; (HBI Radio Brainerd/Wadena, LLC)
- Sister stations: KBLB, KLIZ, KLIZ-FM KVBR, WJJY-FM

History
- First air date: 1994 (as KABD)
- Former call signs: KABD (1994, CP); KVBR-FM (1994–1996); KFGI (1996–2004)
- Call sign meaning: sounds similar to the word "Cool"

Technical information
- Licensing authority: FCC
- Facility ID: 60495
- Class: C3
- ERP: 20,000 watts
- HAAT: 85 meters (279 ft)
- Transmitter coordinates: 46°19′56.00″N 94°10′26.00″W

Links
- Public license information: Public file; LMS
- Webcast: Listen live
- Website: www.cool1035.com

KUAL-FM (103.5 MHz; "Cool 103.5") is a radio station licensed to Brainerd, Minnesota, United States. The station is owned by Hubbard Broadcasting, Inc. and the broadcast license is held by HBI Radio Brainerd/Wadena, LLC. KUAL broadcasts an oldies/classic hits format. During the holiday season, the station broadcasts holiday music along with the program "This Was Christmas".

KUAL is a sister station to KVBR 1340 (business news/talk), KLIZ 1380 (sports), KBLB 93.3 (country), WJJY-FM 106.7 (adult contemporary), and KLIZ-FM 107.5 (classic rock). All are located in a brand new modern broadcast facility located at 13225 Dogwood Drive, Baxter.

== History ==
The Brainerd 103.5 facility began as a construction permit under the call sign KABD. In 1993, FMedia! reported that June Persons was the new grantee for 103.5 MHz in Brainerd. The newsletter later clarified that June Persons was the wife of Charlie Persons and reported that the sale of KABD to Jim Ingstad Broadcasting had been announced. By spring 1994, FMedia! reported that June and Charlie Persons were still involved with building the station, with hopes of putting it on the air in June.

The station changed call signs from KABD to KVBR-FM on June 1, 1994. The new KVBR-FM carried a country format; The M Street Journal listed the station as carrying Westwood One's Hot Country format, while FMedia! listed it as "The Bear 103.5" and noted an identification with Baxter.

In early 1996, Jim Ingstad Broadcasting agreed to sell nine northern Minnesota stations to Robert Kommerstad's Provident Investment Counsel. The Brainerd stations in the transaction included KVBR, KLIZ, KLIZ-FM and KVBR-FM. Broadcasting & Cable listed the sale price as $4.1 million and described KVBR-FM as a 103.5 MHz facility with 6,000 watts and a hot-country format. KVBR-FM changed call signs to KFGI on May 15, 1996.

The KUAL-FM call sign moved to 103.5 on April 1, 2004, as part of a call-sign and format swap with 101.5 FM in Crosby. NorthPine reported that, after BL Broadcasting's takeover of the former Kommerstad stations, KUAL-FM's "Kool" oldies format moved from 101.5 to the 103.5 Brainerd facility, while the "Froggy" country format moved from 103.5 to 101.5. The Federal Communications Commission's call-sign action report confirmed that KUAL-FM was assigned to the Brainerd facility, formerly KFGI, effective April 1, 2004.

In 2015, Hubbard Broadcasting closed on its purchase of 16 Minnesota stations and one translator from Omni Broadcasting for $8 million. The acquired stations included KUAL-FM in Brainerd, along with other Brainerd-area stations. Hubbard currently identifies the station as Cool 103.5, "The Lakes Greatest Hits", and lists it as a home for Minnesota Twins baseball and Minnesota Wild hockey.
