= KSTC-TV =

Television station in Minneapolis

- Minneapolis–Saint Paul, Minnesota; United States
- City: Minneapolis, Minnesota
- Channels: Digital: 30 (UHF); Virtual: 5.2
- Branding: 45tv; 45 Eyewitness News; MeTV Twin Cities (5.3)

Programming
- Affiliations: 5.2: Independent / ABC (alternate); for others, see § Subchannels

Ownership
- Owner: Hubbard Broadcasting; (KSTC-TV, LLC)
- Sister stations: KSTP-TV, KSTP, KSTP-FM, KTMY

History
- First air date: June 19, 1994
- Former call signs: KVBM (1994–2000)
- Former channel numbers: Analog: 45 (UHF, 1994–2009); Digital: 44 (UHF, 2003–2009), 45 (UHF, 2009–2019); Virtual: 45 (2003–2011)
- Former affiliations: HSN (1994–2000)
- Call sign meaning: KSTP Twin Cities (co-owned with KSTP)

Technical information
- Licensing authority: FCC
- Facility ID: 35843
- ERP: 1,000 kW
- HAAT: 436 m (1,430 ft)
- Transmitter coordinates: 45°3′45″N 93°8′22″W
- Translator(s): see § Translators

Links
- Public license information: Public file; LMS
- Website: www.45tv.com

KSTC-TV (channel 5.2) is an independent television station licensed to Minneapolis, Minnesota, United States, serving the Twin Cities area. Owned by Hubbard Broadcasting, it is sister to Saint Paul–licensed ABC affiliate and company flagship KSTP-TV (channel 5), and radio stations KSTP (1500 AM), KSTP-FM (94.5), and KTMY (107.1 FM). The five outlets share studios on University Avenue, on the Saint Paul–Minneapolis border; KSTC-TV's transmitter is located at Telefarm Towers in Shoreview. The station is branded as 45TV in reference to its former analog, digital, and virtual channel number; it is still carried on channel 45 on some cable systems in outlying areas of the market, as well as on DirecTV and Dish Network.

KSTC-TV also serves the Mankato market (via K14KE-D in nearby St. James through the local municipal-operated Cooperative TV [CTV] network of translators), as that area does not have an independent station of its own.

KSTC-TV's main signal is also seen on the second subchannel of both of KSTP-TV's full-power satellite stations, KSAX (channel 42.2) in Alexandria, and KRWF (channel 43.2) in Redwood Falls; both stations carry KSTC-TV over-the-air in widescreen standard definition due to transmitter multiplexer limitations, though it is available in high definition on pay-TV services otherwise. KSTC-TV is also carried in high definition on KSTP-TV's main signal and translator stations as a repeater signal, classed as KSTP-DT5.

KSTC-TV is the only television station in the area with its own mascot, Dr. Chuck Ells, who is often seen at community events. The former mascot was the "45 Guy".

== History ==
The station began operations under the KVBM call letters. Although Federal Communications Commission (FCC) records indicate that a license for this station was granted in 1987, it did not take to the airwaves until June 1994. The station aired Minnesota Department of Transportation traffic information as well as the Home Shopping Network (HSN) until it was purchased by Hubbard Broadcasting on April 24, 2000. Hubbard relaunched the station as KSTC on September 1. To get attention for the switch from KVBM to KSTC, Hubbard ran an advertising campaign around the theme of people with an assortment of ages saying "I'm 45!" to build word of mouth about what the phrase meant, knowing few in the market ever watched KVBM (or even knew a channel 45 existed) and would be curious about what the phrase actually referred to.

In 2003, KSTC began broadcasting its digital signal. KSTC-DT, on ATSC channel 45.1 in standard definition, simulcast the station's regular content. On 45.2 was HDnet in high definition (the network's only ever over-the-air presence outside of encrypted over-the-air subscription services). After its contract with the network ended, channel 45.2 was taken off-the-air. It signed-on again December 1, 2006, as a high definition sports channel which included a schedule of live Minnesota Wild and Minnesota Timberwolves games in the format, along with Minnesota State High School League sports. On or around June 30, 2010, KSTC began carrying This TV in standard definition, with KSTC's main channel beginning to be transmitted in high definition with sports content merged into the main KSTC schedule.

Until late 2008, KSTC heavily promoted its ties to KSTP-TV. It branded itself as "FORTY5," and used a logo in which the "Y" in "FORTY" was converted into a digital "4" superimposed on channel 5's longtime "groovy 5" logo.

== Programming ==
As an independent station, the station runs a variety of syndicated programming mostly consisting of off-network shows. Indeed, Hubbard signed on KSTC primarily as a home for a large inventory of syndicated programming that KSTP-TV no longer had time to air. Movies considered one and two-star are aired frequently while some locally produced material is aired each week. In the decades it has been operating under the KSTC call letters, several other low-budget programs made specifically for this station have come and gone. These included a weekly horror movie broadcast under the name Horror Incorporated (hosted by Count Dracula played by Jake Esau, the actual owner of the countdracula.com domain name). The last incarnation of Horror Incorporated was hosted by Uncle Ghoulie (Thom Lange), Carbuncle (Tim McCall), 13 (Sasha Yvonne Walloch), Gordon the Gorilla, and Wolfie. As of 2004, at least one KSTC-specific program was still airing: Nate on Drums, a comedy and variety show hosted by Nate Perbix, is reportedly syndicated to a network of stations across Minnesota.

Today, most local programs come from KSTP including On the Road with longtime KSTP reporter Jason Davis and Sports Wrap. In 2004, KSTC announced a six-year over-the-air partnership with the Minnesota Timberwolves allowing the station to broadcast a number of the team's regular-season and postseason basketball games. Also that year, the station entered into an eleven-year partnership with the Minnesota State High School League to broadcast state athletic tournaments as well as educational and student programs. KSTC pays the league $9.7 million in rights fees and provides an additional $10.6 million worth of promotion for those tournaments and other league programs. KSTC-TV also televised Minnesota Golden Gophers men's basketball games from 2006 to 2007.

In 2009, KSTC and the MSHSL extended their broadcast partnership until 2021. Starting in 2010, some tournaments were broadcast online. Additionally in December 2004, they established a multi-year partnership to air Minnesota Wild hockey games. Other sports have also aired on the station in the past including Minnesota Twins and Saint Paul Saints baseball, boxing, and even Robot Wars-style combat between mechanical competitors. As of summer 2006, KSTC has been including actual viewers in their programming promotions. Most include a viewer describing their favorite scene or character from one of the shows on the station. The station may also take on the responsibility of airing shows from ABC whenever KSTP cannot do so as a result of extended breaking news or severe weather coverage, or special programming.

== Newscasts ==
In the early 2000s, KSTC experimented with carrying a two-hour extension of KSTP's weekday morning newscast from 7 to 9 a.m., providing an all-local alternative to Good Morning America on channel 5. On July 19, 2009, KSTP began to produce daily newscasts for KSTC full-time. The newscasts run for two hours starting at 7 a.m. and hour-long noon newscast on weekdays and for an hour at 9 p.m, (a half-hour on Saturdays), which respectively compete with Fox owned-and-operated station KMSP-TV (channel 9)'s in-house morning newscast and KMSP's prime time newscast at 9 p.m. In the late 2010s, the station also began to carry an hour-long noon newscast on weekdays from KSTP, along with the previous day's edition of Twin Cities Live at 9 a.m.

== Technical information ==
=== Subchannels ===
The signal of KSTP-TV contains four subchannels, while KSTC-TV's signal contains five. KSTP hosts the ATSC 1.0 signal of CW affiliate WUCW (channel 23) through an agreement with Sinclair Broadcast Group. Through the use of virtual channels, KSTC-TV's subchannels are associated with channel 5.

Subchannels of KSTP-TV and KSTC-TV
| Channel | Station | Res. | Short name | Programming |
|---|---|---|---|---|
| 5.1 | KSTP-TV | 720p | KSTPDT | ABC |
| 5.2 | KSTC-TV | 720p | 45TV | Independent |
| 5.3 | KSTC-TV | 480i | MeTV | MeTV |
| 5.4 | KSTC-TV | 480i | GetTV | Great |
| 5.5 | KSTC-TV | 720p | KSTCCam | Traffic cameras |
| 5.6 | KSTC-TV | 480i | MeTOONS | MeTV Toons |
| 5.7 | KSTP-TV | 480i | H & I | Heroes & Icons |
| 5.8 | KSTP-TV | 480i | IonPlus | Ion Plus |
| 23.1 | KSTP-TV | 1080i | The CW | The CW (WUCW) |

Broadcast on behalf of another station

Subchannels of KSAX and KRWF
| Channel | | Res. | Short name | | Programming |
| KSAX | KRWF | Res. | KSAX | KRWF | Programming |
|---|---|---|---|---|---|
| 42.1 | 43.1 | 720p | KSAX-DT | KRWF-DT | ABC (KSTP-TV) |
| 42.2 | 43.2 | 720p | KSAXDT2 | KRWFDT2 | KSTC-TV (Independent) (Note: 480i on KRWF-DT2) |
| 42.3 | 43.3 | 480i | KSAXDT3 | KRWFDT3 | MeTV (KSTC-TV) |
| 42.5 | 43.5 | 720p | KSAXCam | KRWFCam | Traffic cameras (KSTC-TV) |

=== Analog-to-digital conversion ===
KSTC-TV shut down its analog signal, over UHF channel 45, on June 12, 2009, the official date on which full-power television stations in the United States transitioned from analog to digital broadcasts under federal mandate. The station's digital signal relocated from its pre-transition UHF channel 44 to channel 45. In October 2011, KSTP and KSTC unified all of their over-the-air channels as virtual subchannels of KSTP. As a result, the virtual channels of KSTC changed. The main KSTC channel is now on 5.2, with This TV now being tuned to 5.6.

On September 2, 2019, KSTC moved from physical channel 45 to 30 as part of the ongoing spectrum reallocation. The station continues to use the 45TV branding.

=== Translators ===
In addition, KSTP-TV's signal is further extended by way of twelve translators in central and southern Minnesota. Seven of them nominally repeat KSAX and are part of that station's license.

- K18DG-D Alexandria (translates KSAX)
- K17NW-D Alexandria (translates KSTC-TV)
- K28DD-D Bemidji (translates KSAX)
- K16BQ-D Brainerd (translates KSAX)
- K14KD-D Frost (translates KSTP-TV)
- K34NV-D Frost (translates KSTC-TV)
- K17MY-D Jackson (translates KSTP-TV)
- K29LV-D Jackson (translates KSTC-TV)
- K21NS-D Olivia (translates KSTP-TV)
- K31OR-D Olivia (translates KSTC-TV)
- K32FY-D Park Rapids (translates KSAX)
- K35NY-D Redwood Falls (translates KSTP-TV)
- K28LL-D Redwood Falls (translates KSTC-TV)
- K30FN-D St. James^{1} (translates KSTP-TV)
- K14KE-D St. James^{1} (translates KSTC-TV)
- K17FE-D Wadena (translates KSAX)
- K21HX-D Walker (translates KSAX)
- K35KH-D Walker (translates KSTC-TV)
- K19IH-D Willmar (translates KSAX)

^{1}Translator is in the Mankato market.
