= Stanley Hubbard =

American billionaire heir and businessman

- Born: Stanley Stub Hubbard; 1933 (age 92–93)
- Education: University of Minnesota
- Occupation: Businessman
- Title: Chairman and CEO, Hubbard Broadcasting
- Spouse: Karen Hubbard
- Children: 5
- Father: Stanley Eugene Hubbard

Stanley Stub Hubbard (born 1933) is an American billionaire heir and businessman. He is the chairman and chief executive officer (CEO) of Hubbard Broadcasting, founded by his father. Much of his fortune was earned through the operations of family-owned media holdings which include dozens of radio and television stations in the US. He was also the founder of United States Satellite Broadcasting, a forerunner to DirecTV, which absorbed USSB in 1998.

== Early life ==
Stanley Stub Hubbard was born in 1933. His father, Stanley E. Hubbard, was the founder of Hubbard Broadcasting. He has a bachelor's degree from the University of Minnesota.

== Career ==
Hubbard started working for Hubbard Broadcasting in 1951, became president in 1967, and became chairman and CEO in 1983.

As of February 2021, he had a net worth of US$1.9 billion.

== Political activity ==
Hubbard is a prolific Republican and Conservative donor. Hubbard made political contributions to Scott Walker's presidential campaign in 2015. Hubbard also donated money to Our Principles PAC, a Super PAC dedicated to stopping the presidential nomination of Donald Trump in the 2016 election, but then donated to Trump-aligned Super PACs after Trump became the presumptive nominee.

Together with his spouse, Hubbard contributed $25,000 to Donald Trump's 2020 presidential campaign.

== Personal life ==
Hubbard is married to Karen. They have five children and live in St Paul, Minnesota.

== Awards ==
In 1991, he was inducted into the Broadcasting & Cable Magazine's first Hall of Fame.

In 1992, he was inducted into the Society of Satellite Professionals International Hall of Fame.

In 1994, he was a recipient of the SBCA's Arthur C. Clarke Award.

In 1995, Hubbard was the co-recipient (along with his father) of the Distinguished Service Award from the National Association of Broadcasters.

In 1997, he received the Golden Plate Award of the American Academy of Achievement.

In 2017, he received the First Amendment Leadership Award from the Radio Television Digital News Foundation.
