= WJJY-FM =

Coordinates: 46.443°N 94.382°W

- Brainerd, Minnesota; United States
- Broadcast area: Brainerd micropolitan area
- Frequency: 106.7 MHz
- RDS: PI: 6D6E; PS/RT: Title By Artist On WJJY
- Branding: 106.7 WJJY

Programming
- Format: Hot adult contemporary
- Affiliations: ABC News Radio

Ownership
- Owner: Hubbard Broadcasting, Inc.; (HBI Radio Brainerd/Wadena, LLC)
- Sister stations: KLIZ; KLIZ-FM; KVBR; KBLB; KUAL-FM

History
- First air date: July 21, 1978

Technical information
- Licensing authority: FCC
- Facility ID: 5394
- Class: C1
- ERP: 100,000 watts
- HAAT: 170 meters (560 ft)

Links
- Public license information: Public file; LMS
- Webcast: Listen live
- Website: www.1067wjjy.com

WJJY-FM (106.7 MHz) is a radio station that is located in Baxter, Minnesota, with a hot adult contemporary format.

WJJY-FM's sister stations include KVBR 1340, KLIZ 1380, KBLB 93.3, KUAL-FM 103.5, and KLIZ-FM 107.5. All of the aforementioned stations are located in a broadcast facility located at 13225 Dogwood Drive, Baxter.

WJJY-FM is not licensed by the Federal Communications Commission to broadcast in HD.

== History ==
The 106.7 MHz facility that became WJJY-FM was developed in the late 1970s. Federal Communications Commission (FCC) application records show a construction-era minor modification filed in 1976 and granted in 1978, followed by a license-to-cover application filed July 10, 1978 and granted April 1, 1980. The station's registered tower record lists a build date of June 1, 1978.

By 1980, Fred Directory of Radio listed WJJY-FM in Brainerd at 106.7 MHz with 100,000 watts. The station was owned by Tower Broadcasting Corp.; James R. Pryor was listed as general manager, James J. O'Rourke as program director and music director, Margaret Ames as news director, Richard Tyner as chief engineer, and Bruce Salberg as sales manager.

The station was originally associated with the WJJY call sign before becoming WJJY-FM. In 1986, Broadcasting reported that Tower Broadcasting had received the WJJY call sign for a new AM station in Baxter, while the existing Brainerd FM was listed as changing from WJJY to WJJY-FM. FCCInfo's call-sign history lists WJJY-FM from April 28, 1986, with WJJY as the earlier call sign.

During the Tower Broadcasting era, WJJY-FM operated as part of an AM/FM operation in Brainerd. A Minnesota station directory listing from the early 1990s showed Tower Broadcasting officers James Pryor and Mary Pryor at 410 Front Street in Brainerd. The directory's FM entry listed the station with an adult contemporary format, affiliations with the Mutual Broadcasting System and CBS Radio Network, 100,000 watts, a 626-foot (191 m) antenna height, and 24-hour operation.

The station changed ownership in the 1990s. FCC records show an assignment of authorization for WJJY-FM filed January 12, 1994 and granted March 2, 1994. Later FCC records identify BL Broadcasting, Inc. as the applicant for WJJY-FM, with Louis H. Buron Jr. listed as certifier on a 2002 application. Under BL Broadcasting and the Buron/Campbell Omni Broadcasting group, WJJY-FM was part of a larger cluster of central and northern Minnesota radio stations. FCC records list technical modification and license-to-cover activity for WJJY-FM in 1998, 2000, 2001, and 2002, with the 2002 minor modification becoming the active license record.

WJJY-FM also became known for community service. The Radiothon to End Child Abuse history says Omni Broadcasting expanded the radiothon to the Brainerd Lakes area in 1994, with WJJY-FM 106.7 among the participating stations. The National Association of Broadcasters (NAB) lists WJJY-FM as a Crystal Radio Award winner in 2001, 2003, 2007, 2021 and 2024. In 2025, NAB named WJJY-FM the recipient of the Crystal Heritage Award, which recognizes stations that have won five Crystal Radio Awards for long-term community service.

On November 13, 2014, Hubbard Broadcasting announced an agreement to acquire 16 radio stations from Omni Broadcasting Company in the Alexandria, Bemidji, Brainerd and Wadena markets, including WJJY-FM. FCC records show the assignment from BL Broadcasting, Inc. to HBI Radio Brainerd/Wadena, LLC was granted January 26, 2015. The sale closed on February 27, 2015, for $8 million for 16 stations and one translator.

WJJY-FM remains licensed to Brainerd as a class C1 station on 106.7 MHz. FCCInfo lists the station with 100,000 watts effective radiated power and an antenna height above average terrain of 170 meters.

== Programming ==
Every Saturday night, the station plays music from the 1980s entitled "All 80's Saturday Night".

The morning show is hosted by Ken Thomas, who may be better known for doing the station's Cash Calls. Some of the clips from the Cash Call contestants over the years are part of classic bit used on KQRS-FM in Minneapolis titled the "Brainerd Cash Call".
