= WIXK =

- New Richmond, Wisconsin; United States
- Broadcast area: Minneapolis-St. Paul
- Frequency: 1590 kHz
- Branding: Hmong Radio WIXK 1590

Programming
- Format: Hmong language programming

Ownership
- Owner: Mai Yia Vang; (Hmong Radio Broadcast, LLC)

History
- First air date: September 29, 1960
- Call sign meaning: Variation of "Kix" branding used by country radio stations, transposed

Technical information
- Licensing authority: FCC
- Facility ID: 60643
- Class: D
- Power: 5,000 watts (day); 95 watts (night)
- Transmitter coordinates: 45°5′10.00″N 92°34′19.00″W
- Translators: 103.3 W277CW (New Richmond); KEEY-HD3: 106.7 K294AM (West St. Paul)
- Repeater: 102.1 KEEY-HD3 (St. Paul)

Links
- Public license information: Public file; LMS
- Webcast: Listen live
- Website: WIXK Online

WIXK (1590 AM, "Hmong Radio 1590") is a commercial radio station licensed to New Richmond, Wisconsin, United States, and serves the Minneapolis-St. Paul area. Owned by Mai Yia Vang, through licensee Hmong Radio Broadcast, LLC., it broadcasts a music, news and talk radio format for the Hmong community of the Twin Cities.

By day, WIXK transmits with 5,000 watts non-directional; at night, to avoid interference with other stations on 1590 AM, it reduces power to 95 watts. WIXK's transmitter is on Road A near Road G in New Richmond. WIXK programming is also heard on two FM translators: 103.3 W277CW in New Richmond and 106.7 K294AM in West St. Paul (which is fed by an HD Radio digital subchannel of KEEY-FM).

== History ==
On September 29, 1960, the station first signed on the air. For much of its early history, it had a full service, middle of the road (MOR) format of popular adult music, news, sports and community information. It had been a network affiliate of the Mutual Broadcasting System. In 1968, it added an FM station, WIXK-FM, which today is KTMY.

WIXK used to be owned by Hubbard Broadcasting. On August 10, 2012, Hubbard announced that it would sell WIXK to Zoe Communications. The purchase was consummated on December 12, 2012, at a purchase price of $10,000.

WIXK was sold by Zoe Communications to Hmong Radio Broadcast, LLC for $125,000 on terms. The sale was consummated on November 19, 2014.

In the fall of 2017, the station added an FM translator on 103.3 FM, W277CW, which allows the station to reach a wider audience in eastern communities in the Twin Cities. This includes North St. Paul, White Bear Lake, Stillwater and Woodbury. In contrast, the station's AM signal covers most of the metro adequately during the day but due to a drop in power, has a very limited coverage area at night. Another FM translator, K294AM at 106.7 MHz in West St. Paul, was also added to simulcast WIXK programming.

As of September 9, 2020, WIXK was being simulcast on KQGO-HD3. This change came after Hmong Radio Broadcast, LLC's acquisition of previous KFAI translator K294AM (106.7 FM). Upon the consummation of KQGO's sale to the Educational Media Foundation in April 2021, WIXK's simulcast on the HD3 sub-channel was dropped; KEEY-FMHD3 is now the primary originating station for the WIXK simulcast/translator relay.
