= Nate on Drums =

Nate on Drums is a comedy television program airing in the U.S. state of Minnesota on the Twin Cities' channel 45, KSTC-TV. The independently produced, award-winning comedy television program has approximately 1.5 million viewers throughout the Midwest.

The program began in 2002 as a project a 16-city cable access station in the Lake Minnetonka area. Nate on Drums made its debut during the fall of 2005 on KSTC. The first season consisted entirely of sketches by director David Gillette, host Nate Perbix, head writer Linnea Mohn, and David Harris. Many of the sketches were about the growth of the show and its creators. The actors usually portrayed themselves on the screen, using their real names. Throughout the show, there was also hand-drawn animation done by the creator of the show, Gillette, who goes under the pseudonym "Motion Price." The last segment of each show was dedicated to showcasing a local Minnesota band.

At the end of the first season host Nate Perbix left the show, and as a result the second season undertook a completely new format. This retooled structure more closely resembled a sitcom, but the entire series followed the same plotline of David, Linnea, and "Motion" attempting to cope with the loss of Nate, and struggling to start a new business. With the combined loss of its host, the animated segments, and the sketch format, Nate on Drums struggled to keep its fanbase for the first few shows.
