= University Avenue (Minneapolis–Saint Paul) =

Street in Minnesota, U.S.

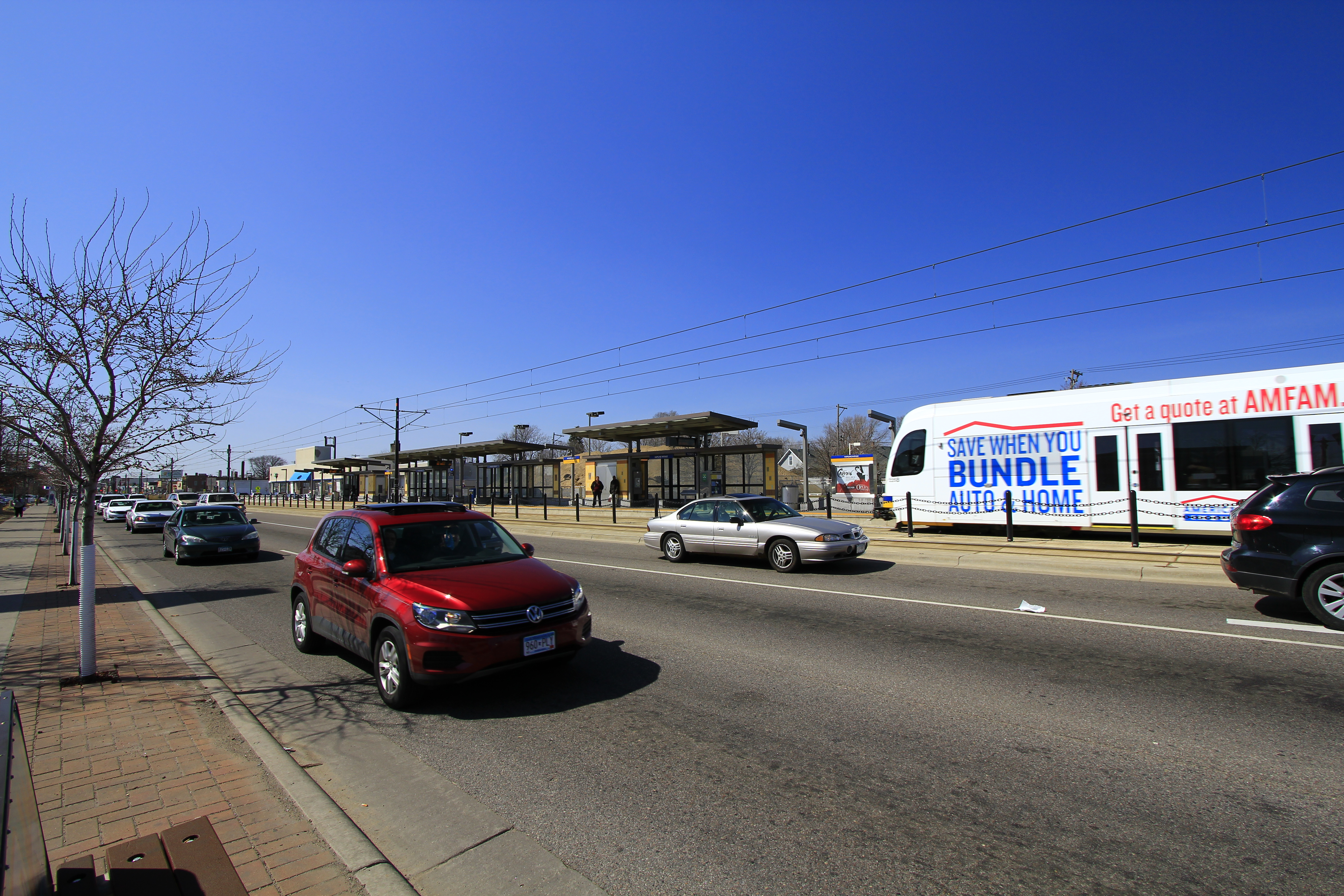
- Traffic on University Avenue at Hamline Avenue

- Location within Minnesota
- Location: Minneapolis and Saint Paul, Minnesota, U.S.
- Coordinates: 44°58′5″N 93°12′28″W
- West end: Andree, Minnesota
- East end: Near Minnesota State Capitol (Saint Paul)

University Avenue is a street that runs through both Minneapolis and Saint Paul, Minnesota. It begins near the Minnesota State Capitol in Saint Paul and extends westward into neighboring Minneapolis, where it passes the University of Minnesota, and then turns north to pass through several suburbs before its main portion ends in Blaine, Minnesota, although there are stretches of road designated as University Avenue that are north of the Blaine terminus, the final stretch ending near Andree, Minnesota. For many years, the road carried U.S. Highway 12 and U.S. Highway 52 (at least for part of its length), and University Avenue is still a significant thoroughfare in the area.

== Overview ==
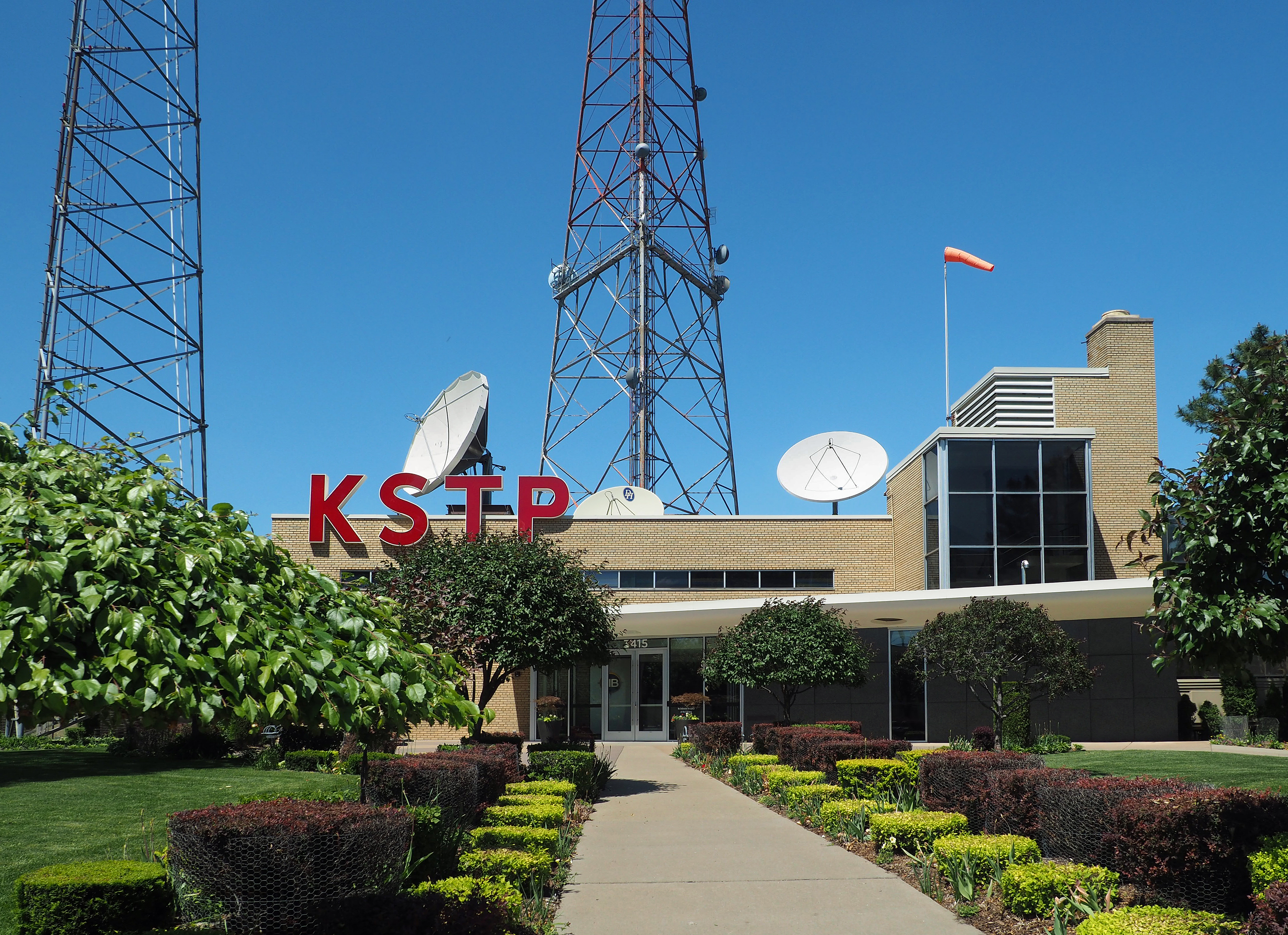
Entrance to the KSTP-AM-FM-TV studios on University Avenue. The sidewalk leading to the building lies precisely on the city line, as does the central leg of the tower.

University Avenue originally ran along a line several blocks north of its current location, forming a route that once connected the Minneapolis campus of the University of Minnesota to Hamline University in Saint Paul (hence the name). When the construction of the Minnesota Transfer Railway yards blocked that route, the street was moved one-half mile to the south on the Saint Paul side, to what was then called Melrose Avenue. The old University Avenue route was renamed Minnehaha Avenue, which it remains to this day.

Some important neighborhoods the road passes through include Frogtown (officially, the Thomas-Dale neighborhood) and the Midway region, both in Saint Paul. Hubbard Broadcasting and its flagship stations, KSTP-AM-FM-TV, are on University at the border of Minneapolis and Saint Paul. In fact, the sidewalk at the KSTP studios is right on the city/county line. This was one of the highest points in the area, an appropriate site for a radio transmitter. An antenna structure still stands there today, though it is used for microwave links rather than broadcasting (KSTP and most other Twin Cities stations use the Telefarm installation in Shoreview, Minnesota, or the nearby KMSP Tower).

A water tower commonly known as the Witch's Hat stands just a few blocks away in Minneapolis's Prospect Park neighborhood.

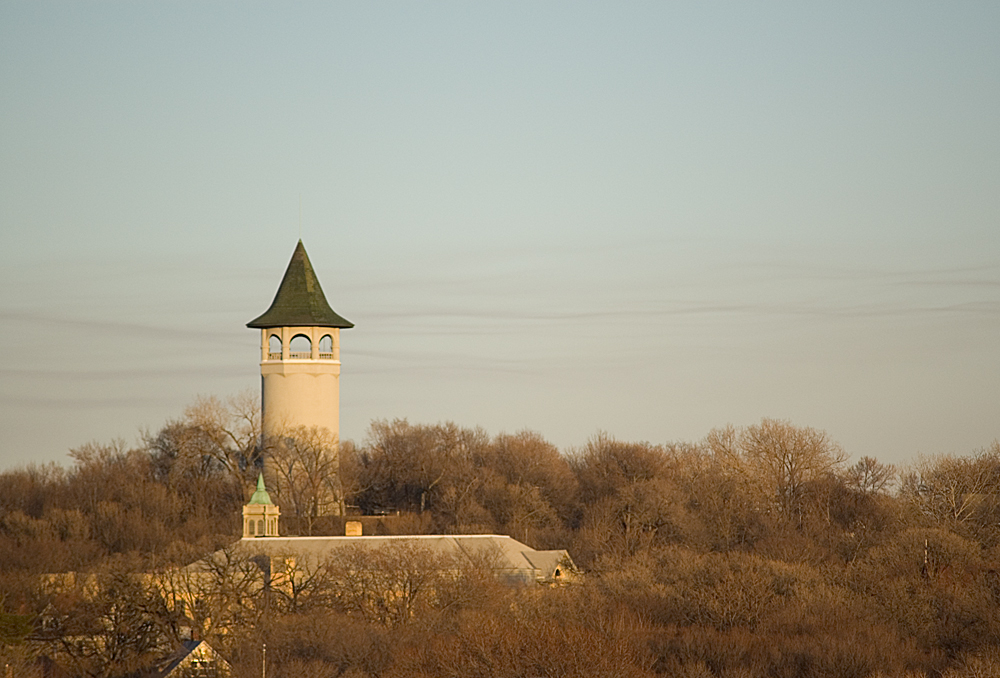
The "Witch's Hat" water tower in Prospect Park. This landmark is only a few blocks from where Minneapolis and Saint Paul meet.

In 1890, the first interurban streetcar link between Minneapolis and Saint Paul used University Avenue and Washington Avenue in Minneapolis. History is now being repeated, as the METRO Green Line light rail connects the two downtowns as well as the University of Minnesota along a similar route.

University Avenue carries Ramsey County Road 34 in Saint Paul, and Hennepin County Road 36 in Minneapolis to the junction with I-35W. West and north of Central Avenue, University Avenue carries Minnesota State Highway 47 to the junction with US 10, after which it carries Anoka County Road 51.
