= Stanley E. Hubbard =

American businessman (1897–1992)

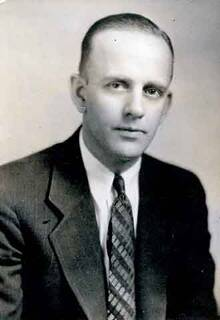
- Hubbard in 1930
- Born: Stanley Eugene Hubbard; June 26, 1897; Red Wing, Minnesota, U.S.
- Died: December 27, 1992 (aged 95); Miami Beach, Florida, U.S.
- Occupations: Founder, Hubbard Broadcasting
- Children: Stanley S. Hubbard

Stanley Eugene Hubbard (June 26, 1897 – December 27, 1992) was an American businessman who was the founder of Hubbard Broadcasting.

== Early life ==
Stanley Eugene Hubbard was born on June 26, 1897, in Red Wing, Minnesota, the son of Frank Valentine Hubbard and Minnie L Ayer. He was an aviator during World War I.

== Career ==
Hubbard took up flying in 1916, started a few airlines, and opened an airport in Louisville, Kentucky. He bought his first radio station in 1923. In 1934, at the request of Minnesota governor Floyd B. Olson, Hubbard allowed political commentator Sylvester McGovern to broadcast his attacks on Olson's political opponents in the radio show 'Minnesota Merry go Round'. This was broadcast on KSTP, which Hubbard owned. Hubbard was a supporter of Olson. In 1943, he helped to organize the Metropolitan Airport Commission. In 1948, he started his first TV station.

His son Stanley S. Hubbard started working for Hubbard Broadcasting in 1951, became president in 1967, and chairman and CEO in 1983.

== Personal life and death ==
His son Stanley Stub Hubbard was born in 1933.

Stanley Eugene Hubbard died on December 27, 1992, at the age of 95.

== Awards ==
In 2014, he was inducted into the National Radio Hall of Fame.
