= KLIZ (AM) =

- Brainerd, Minnesota; United States
- Broadcast area: Brainerd Lakes area
- Frequency: 1380 kHz
- Branding: 1380 KLIZ The Fan

Programming
- Format: Sports
- Affiliations: The Fan Radio Network; Fox Sports Radio; Minnesota Vikings

Ownership
- Owner: Hubbard Broadcasting; (HBI Radio Brainerd/Wadena, LLC)
- Sister stations: KBLB, KLIZ-FM, KUAL-FM, KVBR, WJJY-FM

History
- First air date: August 6, 1946 (at 1400)
- Former frequencies: 1400 kHz (1946–1956)

Technical information
- Licensing authority: FCC
- Facility ID: 28653
- Class: B
- Power: 5,000 watts
- Transmitter coordinates: 46°19′55.08″N 94°10′27.39″W
- Translator: 105.1 K286DB (Brainerd)

Links
- Public license information: Public file; LMS
- Webcast: Listen Live
- Website: kliz.com

KLIZ (1380 kHz, "The Fan") is an AM radio station broadcasting a sports radio format. Licensed to serve Brainerd, Minnesota, United States, it serves the Brainerd Lakes area. It first began broadcasting in 1946. The station is owned by Hubbard Broadcasting. KLIZ's programming is primarily supplied by the Fan Radio Network, based out of KFXN-FM in Minneapolis–St. Paul.

== History ==
KLIZ signed on August 6, 1946, on 1400 AM under the ownership of Brainerd Broadcasting Company. It joined the Mutual Broadcasting System on December 15, 1946. The station moved to 1380 AM in 1956.

By 1971, KLIZ was airing middle of the road and country music, and was affiliated with the NBC Radio Network. In 1973, the station went to a full-time country music format. It moved to a middle of the road format in 1982.

Sequel Communications bought KLIZ and its FM sister station, KLIZ-FM (107.5), in 1985. CD Broadcasting bought the stations in 1987 and changed KLIZ to a contemporary country format. In 1988, news and talk programming were added, along with affiliations with the Associated Press, NBC Talknet, and the Minnesota News Network. CD Broadcasting exchanged the KLIZ stations to Sioux Valley Broadcasting for KJJQ and KKQQ in Volga, South Dakota, in 1989. Sports programming was added to KLIZ's format in 1992.

The KLIZ stations, along with KLLR and KLLZ in Walker, were acquired by Ingstad Broadcasting in a 1994 swap that saw Sioux Valley acquire North Dakota radio stations KDDR and KOVC AM-FM from Ingstad. Country music was dropped in December 1995 in favor of programming from One on One Sports. In 1996, Jim Ingstad Broadcasting sold nine of its northern Minnesota stations, including KLIZ, to the Provident Investment Council; the station's license was transferred to Kommerstad Communications. That May, KLIZ dropped sports for a simulcast of the news/talk programming of sister station KVBR (1340 AM); in November, KLIZ switched to an adult contemporary format provided by Westwood One. In January 1998, KLIZ returned to a talk radio format; by 2000, the station had affiliations with the USA Radio Network and Westwood One.

Omni Broadcasting agreed to acquire the Kommerstad stations in 2003; the purchase had been planned since 2002. Shortly after Omni's BL Broadcasting subsidiary took over in 2004, BL swapped the formats of KLIZ and KVBR; KLIZ became sports radio station "The Fan", with programming being provided by the Fan Radio Network (then based out of KFAN in Minneapolis–St. Paul) and Sporting News Radio. Hubbard Broadcasting announced on November 13, 2014, that it would purchase the Omni Broadcasting stations, including KLIZ; the $8 million sale was completed on February 27, 2015.

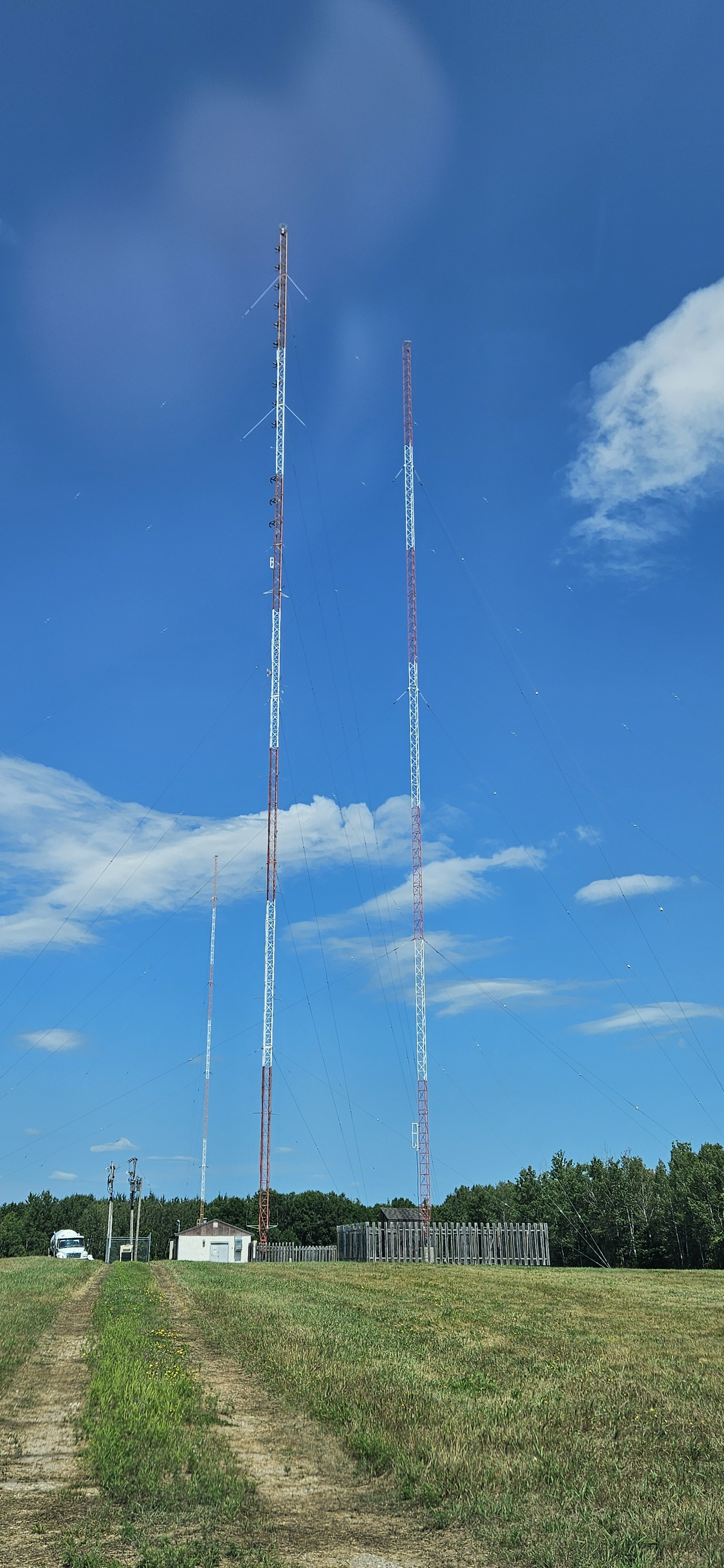
The radio towers for KLIZ 1380 AM and KUAL 103.5, on the southeast side of Brainerd.
