= KTMY =

Talk radio station in Coon Rapids, Minnesota

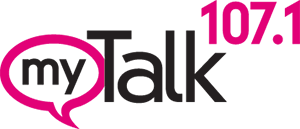
- Coon Rapids, Minnesota; United States
- Broadcast area: Minneapolis-St. Paul, MN
- Frequency: 107.1 MHz (HD Radio)
- Branding: myTalk 107.1

Programming
- Format: Entertainment talk
- Subchannels: HD2: WDGY simulcast (Classic hits / oldies); HD3: Classic rock (KLIZ-FM simulcast)
- Affiliations: ABC News Radio

Ownership
- Owner: Hubbard Broadcasting; (KTMY-FM, LLC)
- Sister stations: Radio: KSTP, KSTP-FM; TV: KSTC-TV, KSTP-TV

History
- First air date: 1968 (as WIXK-FM)
- Former call signs: WIXK-FM (1968–2002); WFMP (2002–2010)
- Call sign meaning: Similar to "MyTalk"

Technical information
- Facility ID: 60641
- Class: C2
- ERP: 22,000 watts
- HAAT: 179 m (587 ft)
- Transmitter coordinates: 45°3′45.0″N 93°8′22.0″W
- Translators: 92.1 K221BS (St. Paul, relays HD2)
- Repeater: 1340 KVBR (Brainerd)

Links
- Webcast: Listen Live
- Website: mytalk1071.com

KTMY (107.1 FM) is an entertainment-oriented talk radio station, serving the Twin Cities as well as portions of West Central Wisconsin. The station is owned and operated by Hubbard Broadcasting. KTMY's studios and offices are located on University Avenue along the boundary line between St. Paul and Minneapolis, and its transmitter is located at Telefarm Towers in Shoreview, Minnesota, off County Road F West.

== Station history ==
The station was originally licensed to serve New Richmond, Wisconsin, as WIXK-FM, simulcasting the country music format of that city's WIXK. Hubbard Broadcasting bought both stations in 2000 for $27 million, and moved WIXK-FM to the immediate Twin Cities area, where the station's city of license was changed from New Richmond to Coon Rapids, Minnesota, and its transmitter moved to the Telefarm installation in Shoreview.

On June 3, 2002, WIXK-FM adopted the WFMP call sign and dropped country in favor of a talk format, originally branded as "FM 107" ("real. life. conversation."), that emphasized issues, topics, and conversations that catered to a female audience. The original "FM 107" schedule included national call-in/advice shows featuring Dr. Laura Schlessinger, Dr. Joy Browne, and Clark Howard, but locally produced programming would make up a majority of the schedule in later years.

The "myTalk 107.1" branding officially went into effect February 2010.

The original myTalk lineup Included Ian and Margery (morning drive), Colleen and The Boys (mid-morning), Jason and Alexis (afternoons), Lori and Julia (afternoon drive), and Brian and Shelletta (evenings from 7:00–9:00 pm). The Brian and Shelletta show was cancelled in July 2010. The 7:00–9:00 P.M. slot was replaced by a rebroadcast of a Jason and Alexis show. Colleen and The Boys (hosted by Colleen Kruse, Chris Reuvers, and G.R. Anderson) was cancelled March 2012, and the time slot was replaced by the Colleen and Bradley show (hosted by Colleen Lindstrom and Bradley Traynor).

In 2007, the station answered a call from condemned inmate Philip Workman to have vegetarian pizza delivered to homeless residents of Nashville, Tennessee.

== HD Radio ==
KTMY has been broadcasting an HD radio signal since October 2011. The station's HD-2 sub-channel aired a simulcast of the sports format from its sister station, KSTP (AM). That simulcast moved to a sub-channel of KSTP-FM in December 2013. The HD-2 is now simulcasting the oldies format of Borgen Broadcasting-owned, WDGY.

As of August 15, 2025, Brainerd sister station KLIZ-FM, which features a classic rock format, can now be heard in the Twin Cities metropolitan area via KTMY's HD3 subchannel.
