= KSTP-FM =

Hot adult contemporary radio station in the Twin Cities region of Minnesota

Coordinates: 45.062°N 93.140°W

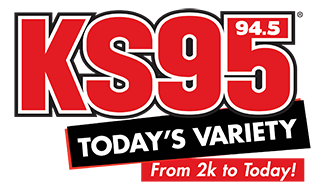

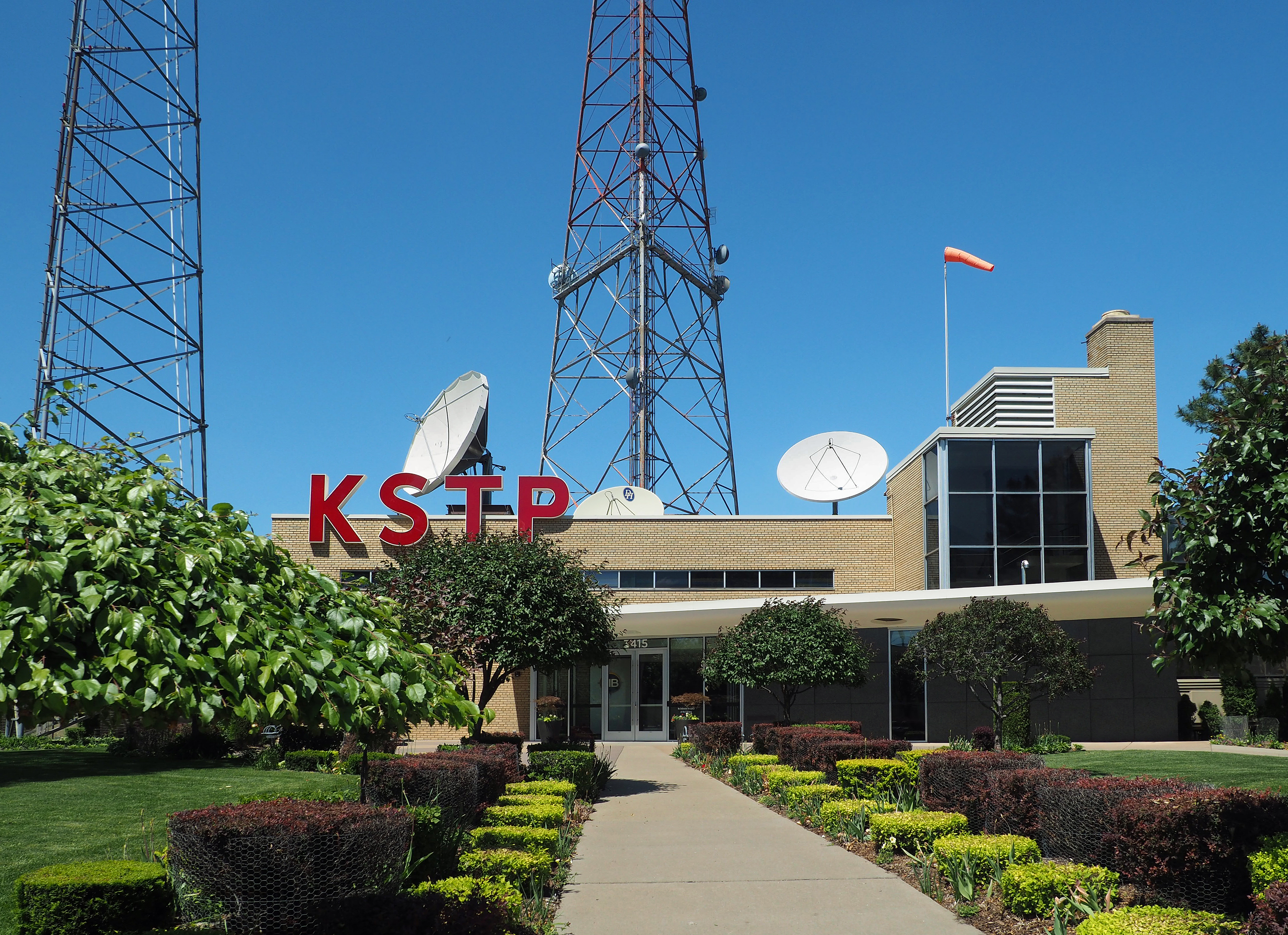
- Entrance to the KSTP studios on University Avenue in Saint Paul, Minnesota in 2020
- St. Paul, Minnesota; United States
- Broadcast area: Minneapolis-St. Paul
- Frequency: 94.5 MHz (HD Radio)
- RDS: PI: 4185; PS: KS95 Title Artist; RT: Now Playing Title by Artist on KS95
- Branding: KS95

Programming
- Language: English
- Format: Hot adult contemporary
- Subchannels: HD2: KSTP simulcast (Sports)

Ownership
- Owner: Hubbard Broadcasting; (KSTP-FM FCC License Sub, LLC)
- Sister stations: KSTC-TV, KSTP, KSTP-TV, KTMY

History
- First air date: November 1, 1965
- Call sign meaning: Saint Paul

Technical information
- Licensing authority: FCC
- Facility ID: 35642
- Class: C
- ERP: 95,000 watts 100,000 with beam tilt
- HAAT: 372 meters (1,220 ft)

Links
- Public license information: Public file; LMS
- Webcast: Listen Live
- Website: ks95.com

KSTP-FM (94.5 MHz) is a commercial radio station in St. Paul, Minnesota, serving the Minneapolis-St. Paul radio market. It is the flagship FM station of Hubbard Broadcasting and airs a hot adult contemporary radio format. It carries syndicated shows from Staci Matthews on afternoons and Carson Daly on Sunday mornings. The station has long been known on-air as "KS95". The studios and offices, located on University Avenue, along the boundary line between St. Paul and Minneapolis, are shared with sister stations KSTP (AM), KSTP-TV, KTMY, and KSTC-TV. There is a broadcasting tower behind the station, though it is only used as an emergency back-up, in case there are problems with the main tower (which is located in Shoreview, Minnesota).

KSTP-FM has an effective radiated power (ERP) of 95,000 watts (100,000 with beam tilt). The transmitter is located at Telefarm Towers in Shoreview, Minnesota, off County Road F West. KSTP-FM broadcasts in the HD Radio hybrid format; the HD-2 subchannel carries the all sports programming heard on KSTP (AM).

== History ==
The current KSTP-FM began broadcasting in November 1965. It was founded by Hubbard Broadcasting, Inc., which already had extensive broadcasting experience, including sister station KSTP (AM). In 1938 and 1939 KSTP (AM) had also operated a high-fidelity AM Apex "experimental audio broadcasting station", W9XUP, originally on 25,950 kHz and later on 26,150 kHz.

In 1946 an FM station, also with the call sign KSTP-FM, signed on at 102.1 MHz. This first KSTP-FM was shut down in 1952 and the license was cancelled, due to management not believing that FM radio would be profitable. It mostly simulcast the AM station, which was an affiliate of the NBC Red Network, and the stations carried NBC's schedule of dramas, comedies, news and sports. The vacated 102.1 assignment is now home to KEEY-FM.

As more stations added FM counterparts in the 1960s, the current KSTP-FM debuted on November 1, 1965, now on its present-day frequency of 94.5 MHz. This new KSTP-FM also simulcast its AM sister's programming, a full service middle of the road format of popular music, news and sports. In the late 1960s, the FM station began separate programming, airing a beautiful music format. With several other Twin Cities FM stations also devoted to easy listening music, Hubbard would flip KSTP-FM to Adult Contemporary branded as "KS95" in 1975. By 1991, KSTP-FM had evolved into a hot adult contemporary format.

KSTP-FM served as the radio flagship for the Minnesota Vikings football team from 1985 to 1987.

== HD Radio ==
KSTP-FM began HD radio broadcasting in 2013, and in December of that year added a simulcast of all-sports sister station KSTP 1500 AM on its HD2 subchannel, a simulcast moved from another Hubbard-owned station, KTMY-HD2. The station added an HD3 subchannel, affiliated with the Spanish-language ESPN Deportes Radio in September 2016. The HD3 subchannel was discontinued in September 2019, after ESPN discontinued ESPN Deportes Radio.

== Awards ==
KSTP-FM has won numerous Crystal Awards, Marconi Awards and Service to America Awards from the National Association of Broadcasters (NAB), noting the station's dominance in its format and dedication to community service.

KSTP-FM's first Crystal Radio Award, which is given annually by the NAB to stations that demonstrate outstanding community service, was won in 2004. The station won Crystal Awards again in 2007 and 2014. KSTP-FM has been honored with several Marconi Awards from the National Association of Broadcasters recognizing the top performing radio stations in America. 2000 - Adult Contemporary Station of the Year, 2007 - Large Market Station of the Year, 2012 - Legendary Station of the Year, 2012 - Large Market Personality of the Year-Moon and Staci, 2013 - Large Market Station of the Year, 2014 - Large Market Personality of the Year-Ryan and Shannon, 2015 - Large Market Station of the Year, 2018 - Adult Contemporary Station of the Year.

The National Association of Broadcasters Education Foundation awarded KSTP-FM the prestigious Service to America Award in 2001, 2008, 2010 and 2014. This award recognizes outstanding community service by local broadcasters.

In 2013 KSTP-FM won an Upper Midwest Regional Emmy Award for Musical Composition/Arrangement for the song "Clouds".

== Past slogans ==
- "KS95, for the great ones. In stereo." (mid-1970s)
- "Gentle is KS95" (mid-1970s)
- "Always 95 And Sunny, KS95" (1981–1991)
- "80s, 90s and Today" (1991–2010)
- "Variety... 90s, 2K and Today" (2010–2014)
- "Today's Variety" (2014–2019)
- "Today's Variety from 2K to Today" (2019-)
