= Hubbard Broadcasting =

American television and radio broadcaster

Coordinates: 44°58′5″N 93°12′25″W

Hubbard Broadcasting, Inc.
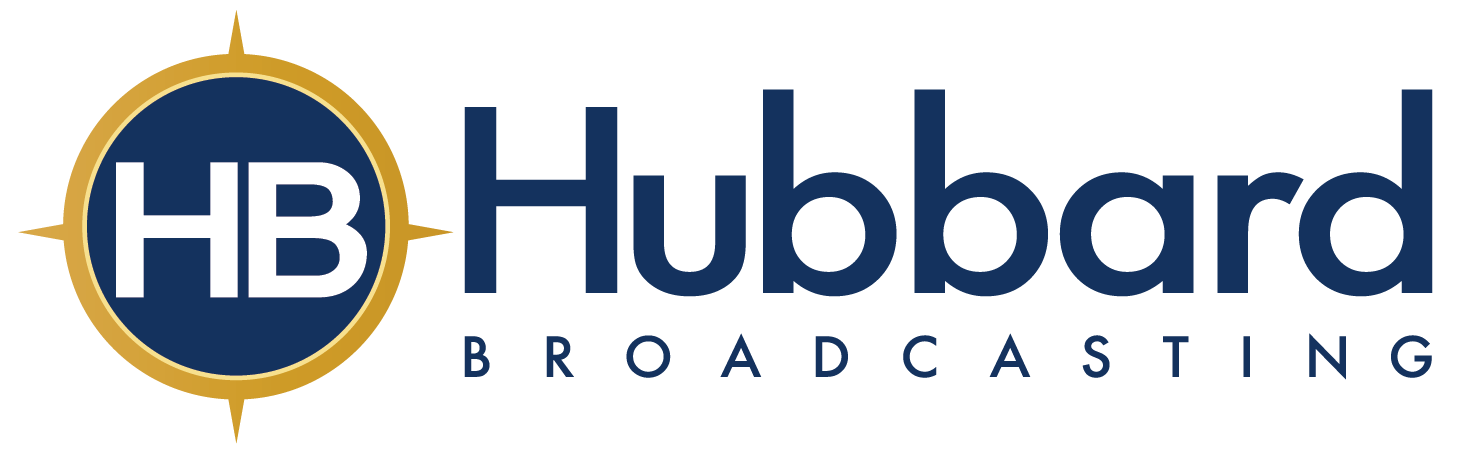

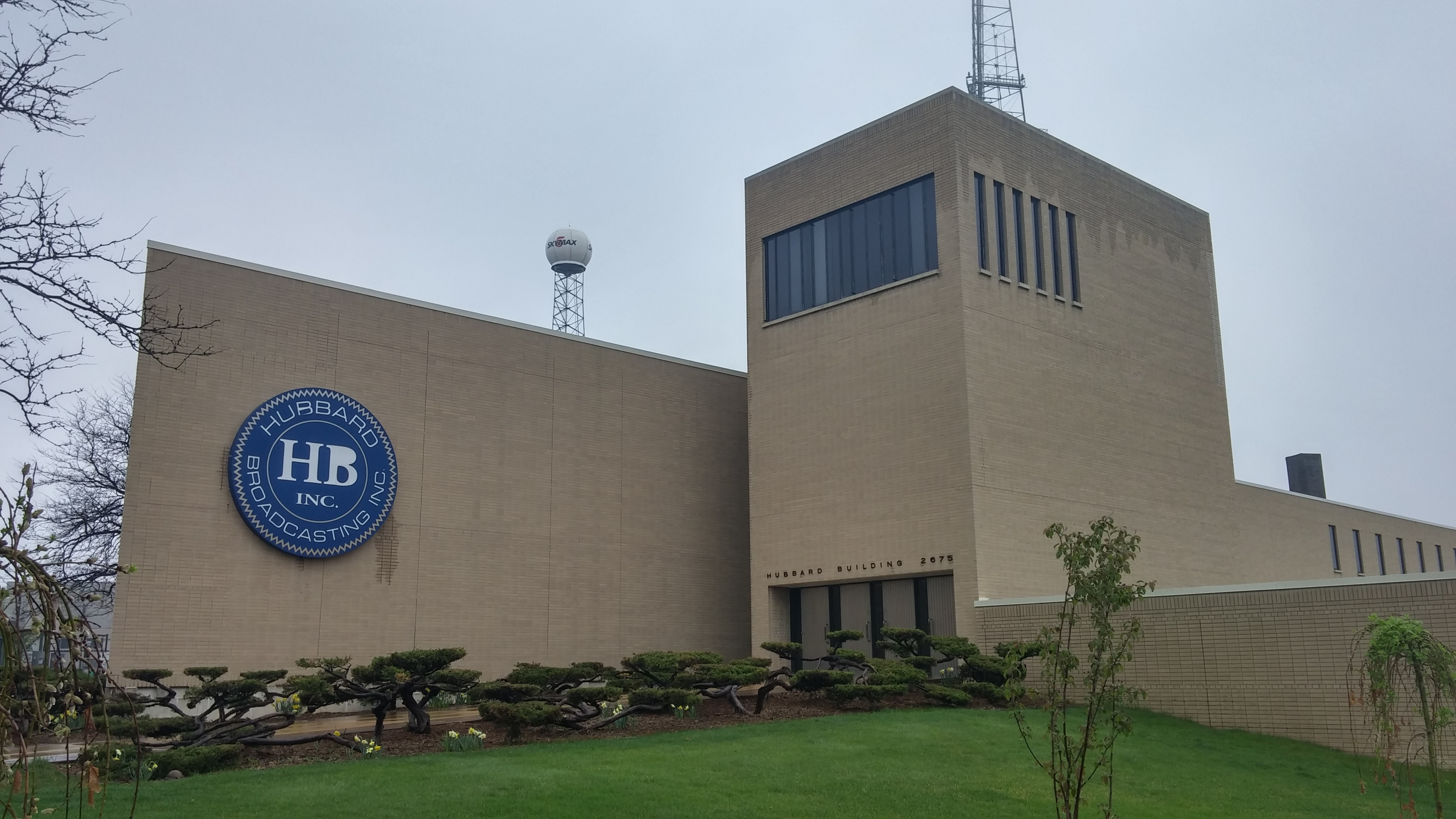
- The Hubbard Broadcasting headquarters in St. Paul, Minnesota, with the KSTP SkyMax 5 tower in the background.
- Type: Private
- Industry: Television and radio broadcasting
- Founded: February 13, 1925; 101 years ago in Twin Cities, Minneapolis, U.S.
- Founder: Stanley E. Hubbard
- Headquarters: Saint Paul, Minnesota, United States
- Area served: United States
- Key people: Stanley S. Hubbard
- Brands: KSTP radio, KSTP-FM, KTMY, KSTP-TV, and KSTC-TV
- Website: hubbardbroadcasting.com

Hubbard Broadcasting, Inc. is an American television and radio broadcasting corporation based in St. Paul, Minnesota. It was founded by Stanley E. Hubbard.

The corporation has broadcast outlets scattered across Minnesota, Wisconsin, Missouri, Illinois, Ohio, New York, Texas, New Mexico, Arizona, Washington, Florida, and Washington, D.C. KSTP radio, KSTP-FM, KTMY, KSTP-TV, and KSTC-TV, which serve the Twin Cities region of Minnesota and western Wisconsin, are regarded as the company's legacy flagship stations.

== History ==
KSTP has its origins in the Twin Cities radio station WAMD ("Where All Minneapolis Dances"), which started broadcasting live dance music from a local ballroom on February 13, 1925, with Stanley E. Hubbard as owner and station director. It was the first radio station to be completely supported by income generated by advertisements.

In 1928, WAMD merged with KFOY (Kind Friends of Yours) radio (first broadcast: March 12, 1924) in St. Paul to become KSTP, which was advertised as being operated by the National Battery Broadcasting Co. Hubbard became the merged station's general manager, and bought controlling interest in 1941. In 1938 Hubbard bought the first television camera available from RCA. Following the television blackout brought on by World War II, KSTP began television broadcasts in 1948.

KSTP is still Hubbard's flagship, although there are now three different stations that carry that name. KSTP (AM) broadcasts a sports radio format, and KSTP-FM broadcasts adult contemporary music; KSTP-TV is affiliated with ABC.

After the Federal Communications Commission relaxed rules about television station ownership, Hubbard bought a second television station in the Twin Cities. Originally affiliated with the Home Shopping Network when it started operations in 1994, KVBM was bought by Hubbard and became general-entertainment independent station KSTC-TV in 2000. It has been used as an alternate outlet for ABC network programming when KSTP-TV is broadcasting coverage of Minnesota Vikings football games or other special shows, including severe-weather coverage.

Aside from terrestrial broadcast stations, other current ventures include the film network ReelzChannel (launched in 2006), the arts network Ovation, and the Hubbard Radio Network, which is used to distribute KSTP's local talk shows to subscribing radio stations in Minnesota and Wisconsin. The cable channels are run through subsidiary company Hubbard Media Group.

On January 9, 1957, owners Time Inc. and the Albuquerque Broadcasting Co., announced that it would sell KOB-AM and KOB-TV to Hubbard for $1.5 million.

In 1981, Hubbard Broadcasting started U.S. Satellite Broadcasting (USSB), and later was instrumental in the development and launching of the first digital satellite system for television in 1994. The new satellite could deliver 175 channels to a (at the time) tiny, 18 inch dish. USSB's development partner, Hughes Electronics (a General Motors subsidiary), launched its own subscription satellite service called DirecTV. The two services did not compete against each other (they carried different channels), and were often marketed together to subscribers by retailers and in advertisements, until DirecTV's 1998 acquisition of USSB.

Hubbard was also instrumental in the development of mobile satellite news vehicles. In 1983, Hubbard-owned CONUS Communications and Florida-based subsidiary Hubcom built the first Satellite News Gathering (SNG) mobile vehicle, which allowed for much easier live news coverage for network and local television news operations. This ultimately resulted in CONUS—later a joint-venture with Viacom—becoming a nationwide, satellite-based newsgathering cooperative (with Hubbard charging stations to relay their footage). As an outgrowth of this, Hubbard Broadcasting also operated a 24-hour news station, the All News Channel, which relied on CONUS-sourced news footage and primarily acted as a "sustaining feed" for television stations to fill air time with; ANC was also responsible for producing news programming for third-parties. The news channel lasted from 1989 until it folded in September 2002, which the channels trademark was spun off to become a website which relaunched.

Hubbard Broadcasting also owned the now-closed Bound to be Read bookstores in St. Paul, Albuquerque, and Key Largo.

As of October 2007, it is engaged in a fevered battle with NABET union repping employees of WNYT in Albany, New York.

In June 2009, the "Society of Professional Journalists" honored Hubbard Broadcasting and KSTP-TV with its national Historical Site in Journalism award.

On January 19, 2011, Hubbard announced the purchase of 17 radio stations in Cincinnati, Chicago, Washington, D.C., and St. Louis from the Church of Jesus Christ of Latter-day Saints subsidiary Bonneville International for $505 million. The sale closed on April 29, 2011.

On February 25, 2013, Hubbard announced that it would purchase MyNetworkTV station WNYA to form a duopoly with WNYT, pending FCC approval. No financial details were announced.

On July 16, 2013, Hubbard announced that it had agreed to purchase 10 stations from Ohio-based Sandusky Radio for $85.5 million.

Hubbard announced on November 13, 2014, that it would purchase the sixteen stations owned by Omni Broadcasting. The Omni stations are all located in central and northern Minnesota.

On September 26, 2018, Hubbard announced that it agreed to purchase six stations owned by Alpha Media in West Palm Beach Florida, for $88 million. The stations include Urban AC 102.3 WMBX, Country 103.1 WIRK, Adult Contemporary 107.9 WEAT, Hot Adult Contemporary 97.9 WRMF, News/Talk 850 WFTL and Sports/Talk 640 WMEN.

Hubbard Broadcasting took over production of Country Top 40 in January 2020 after the death of the program's founder Bob Kingsley. Fitz, a mononymous host with several syndicated country radio programs to his credit, took over as the program's host.

== Hubbard-owned stations ==
Stations are arranged in alphabetical order by state and city of license.

All of the assets are owned by the Stanley S. Hubbard Revocable Trust, and administered by Hubbard Broadcasting, Inc.

(**) indicates a station that was built and signed-on by Hubbard.

=== Television stations ===
Media market	State	Station	Purchased	Affiliation	Notes
Austin–Rochester	Minnesota	KAAL	2001	ABC	
Duluth	Minnesota	WDIO-DT	1987	ABC	
Hibbing	Minnesota	WIRT-DT	1987	ABC	(Note: Satellite of WDIO-DT.)
St. Paul–Minneapolis	Minnesota	KSTP-TV **	1948	ABC	
St. Paul–Minneapolis	Minnesota	KSTC-TV	2000	Independent	
Alexandria	Minnesota	KSAX **	1987	ABC	(Note: Satellite of KSTP-TV.)
Redwood Falls	Minnesota	KRWF **	1987	ABC	(Note: Semi-satellite of KSTP-TV.)
Albuquerque–Santa Fe	New Mexico	KOB	1957	NBC	
Farmington	New Mexico	KOBF	1983	NBC	(Note: Satellite of KOB.)
Las Cruces	New Mexico	K22NM-D	(Note: Operated by News-Press & Gazette station KVIA-TV.)	NBC	
Roswell	New Mexico	KOBR	1985	NBC	
Albany–Schenectady–Troy	New York	WNYT	1996	NBC	
Albany–Schenectady–Troy	New York	WNYA	2013	MyNetworkTV	
Rochester	New York	WHEC-TV	1996 (Note: Acquired by Hubbard from Viacom in 1996.)	NBC	

=== Radio stations ===
AM Station	FM Station

City of license / Market	Station	Owned since	Current format
Phoenix, AZ	KDUS 1060	2013 (Note: Acquired by Hubbard from Sandusky Radio.)	Sports radio
Phoenix, AZ	KAZG 1440	2013	Oldies
Phoenix, AZ	KDKB 93.3	2013	Alternative rock
Phoenix, AZ	KUPD 97.9	2013	Active rock
Phoenix, AZ	KSLX-FM 100.7	2013	Classic rock
Washington, D.C.	WHFS 1050	2011 (Note: Acquired by Hubbard from Bonneville International.)	Freeform (Note: WSHE simulcast.)
Washington, D.C.	WFED 1500	2011	U.S. federal government news
Washington, D.C.	WSHE 820	2011	Freeform
Washington, D.C.	WTOP-FM 103.5	2011	All-news
Washington, D.C.	WTLP 103.9	2011	Contemporary Christian (Note: Operated by K-Love.)
Washington, D.C.	WWWT-FM 107.7	2011	All-news (Note: WTOP simulcast.)
West Palm Beach, FL	WMEN 640	2018 (Note: Acquired by Hubbard from Alpha Media.)	Sports radio
West Palm Beach, FL	WFTL 850	2018	Talk radio
West Palm Beach, FL	WRMF 97.9	2018	Adult Top 40
West Palm Beach, FL	WMBX 102.3	2018	Urban adult contemporary
West Palm Beach, FL	WIRK 103.1	2018	Country
West Palm Beach, FL	WEAT 107.9	2018	Classic hits
Chicago, IL	WDRV 97.1	2011	Classic rock
Chicago, IL	WWDV 96.9	2011	Classic rock (Note: WDRV simulcast.)
Chicago, IL	WTBC-FM 100.3	2011	Rhythmic adult hits
Chicago, IL	WTMX 101.9	2011	Hot adult contemporary
Alexandria, MN	KULO 94.3	2015 (Note: Acquired by Hubbard from Omni Broadcasting.)	Classic hits
Alexandria, MN	KIKV-FM 100.7	2015	Country
Bemidji, MN	KBUN 1450	2015	Sports radio
Bemidji, MN	KKZY 95.5	2015	Adult contemporary
Bemidji, MN	KLLZ-FM 99.1	2015	Classic rock
Bemidji, MN	KBHP 101.1	2015	Country
Bemidji, MN	KBUN-FM 104.5	2015	Sports radio
Brainerd–Baxter, MN	KVBR 1340	2015	Female-oriented talk (Note: KTMY simulcast.)
Brainerd–Baxter, MN	KLIZ 1380	2015	Sports radio
Brainerd–Baxter, MN	KBLB 93.3	2015	Country
Brainerd–Baxter, MN	KUAL-FM 103.5	2015	Oldies/classic hits
Brainerd–Baxter, MN	WJJY-FM 106.7	2015	Adult contemporary
Brainerd–Baxter, MN	KLIZ-FM 107.5	2015	Classic rock
St. Paul–Minneapolis, MN	KSTP 1500**	1928	Sports radio
St. Paul–Minneapolis, MN	KSTP-FM 94.5**	1966	Hot adult contemporary
St. Paul–Minneapolis, MN	KTMY 107.1	2000	Female-oriented talk
Wadena–Staples, MN	KWAD 920	2015	Classic country
Wadena–Staples, MN	KNSP 1430	2015	Sports radio
Wadena–Staples, MN	KKWS 105.9	2015	Country
St. Louis, MO	KPNT 105.7	2018 (Note: Acquired by Hubbard from Emmis Communications.)	Alternative rock
St. Louis, MO	KSHE 94.7	2018	Mainstream rock
St. Louis, MO	WARH 106.5	2011	Adult hits
St. Louis, MO	WIL-FM 92.3	2011	Country
St. Louis, MO	WXOS 101.1	2011	Sports radio
Cincinnati, OH	WKRQ 101.9	2011	Adult Top 40
Cincinnati, OH	WREW 94.9	2011	Adult contemporary
Cincinnati, OH	WUBE-FM 105.1	2011	Country
Cincinnati, OH	WYGY 97.3	2011	Country Top 40
Seattle, WA	KIXI 880	2013	Adult standards
Seattle, WA	KKNW 1150	2013	Classic country
Seattle, WA	KQMV 92.5	2013	Contemporary hit radio
Seattle, WA	KPNW-FM 98.9	2013	Country
Seattle, WA	KRWM 106.9	2013	Adult contemporary

=== Cable channels (through Hubbard Media Group division) ===
- Ovation (purchased August 2006)
- Reelz (launched September 2006)

== Former Hubbard-owned stations ==
=== Former television stations ===
Media market	State	Station	Purchased	Sold	Notes
St. Petersburg–Tampa	Florida	WTOG **	1968	1996	
Silver City	New Mexico	KOBG-TV **	2000	2011	(Note: License for this station was cancelled.) (Note: Replaced by KOB translator K12QW-D.)

Hubbard also owned a partial stake in KWK-TV (later KMOX-TV, now KMOV), channel 4, in St. Louis during the mid-1950s.

=== Radio stations ===
AM Station	FM Station

City of license / Market	Station	Years owned	Current status
Albuquerque, NM	KOB 770	1957–1986	KKOB, owned by Cumulus Media
Albuquerque, NM	KOB-FM 93.3	1957–1986	KOBQ, owned by Cumulus Media
Winter Haven, FL	WGTO 540	1964–1986	WFLF, owned by iHeartMedia
New Richmond, WI	WIXK 1590	2000–2012	owned by Hmong Radio Broadcast, LLC

=== Cable channels ===
- All News Channel (1989–2002, defunct; joint venture with Viacom)
- Prime Sports Upper Midwest (1989–95; joint venture with Liberty Media)
