= KSTP (AM) =

Clear-channel ESPN Radio affiliate in the Minneapolis–St. Paul metropolitan area

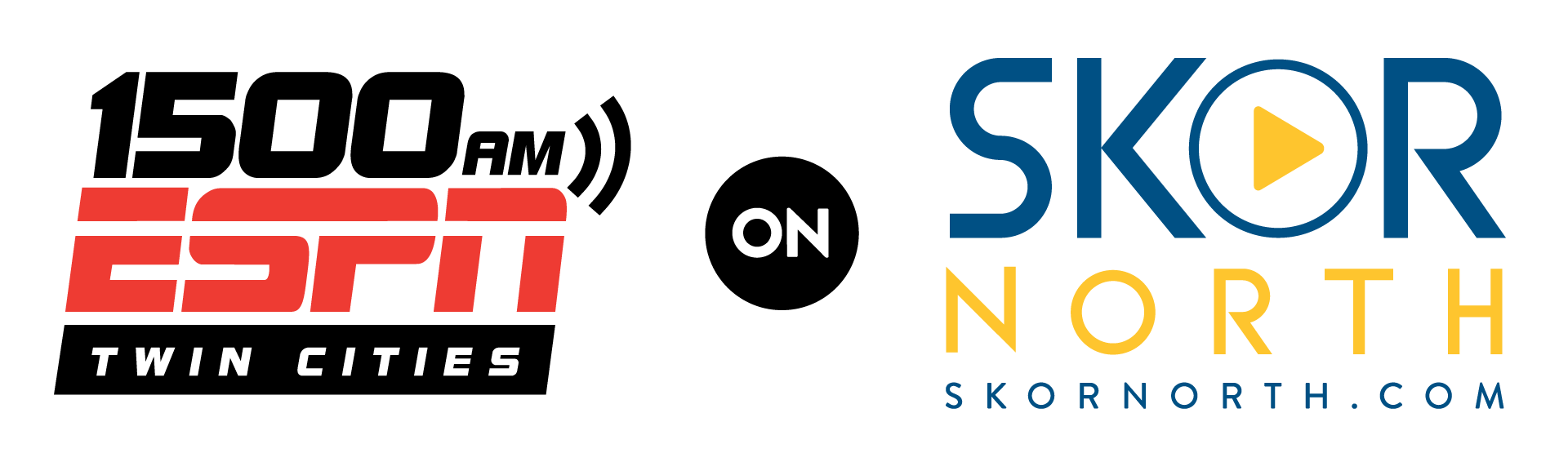

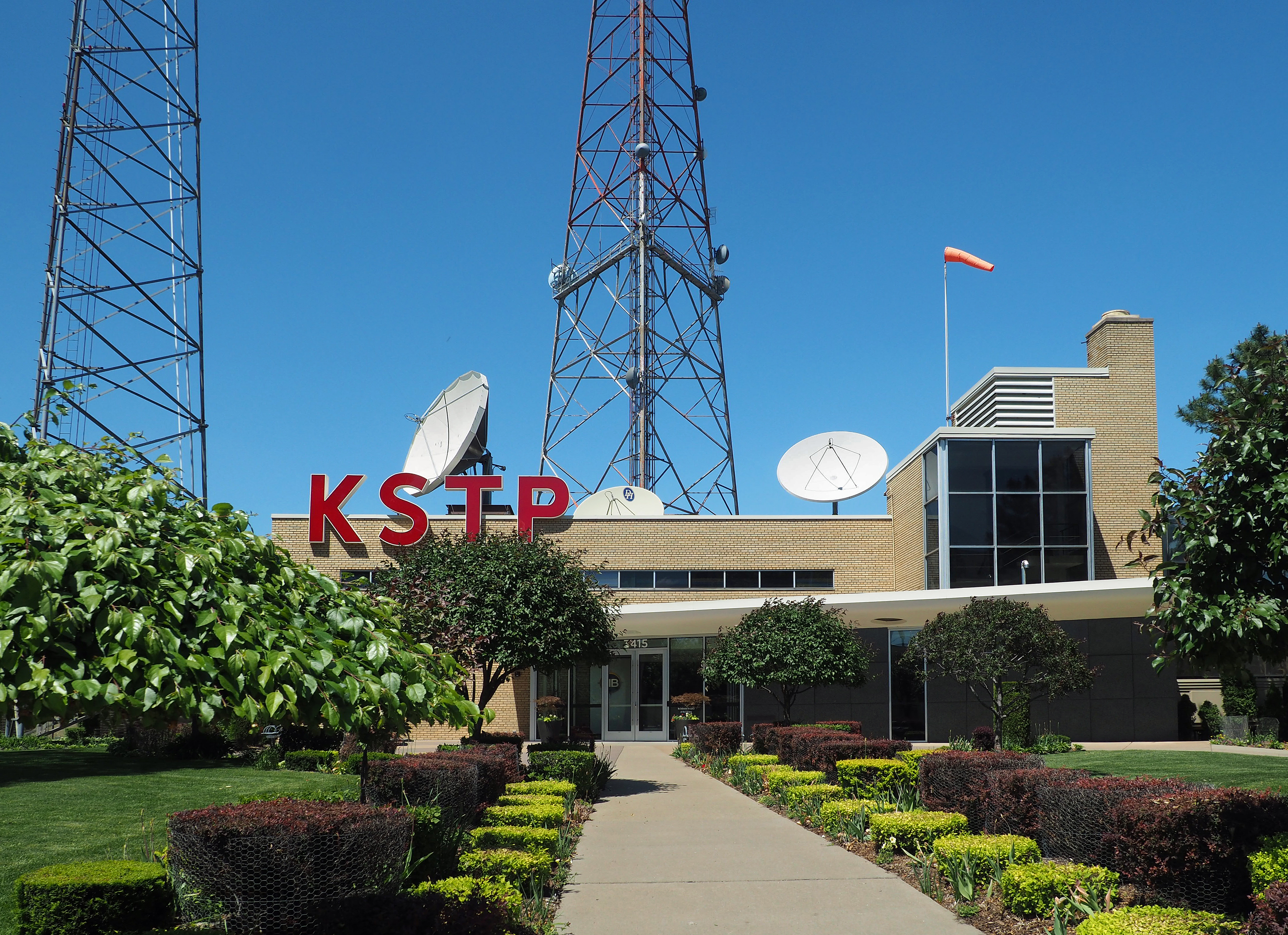
- Entrance to the KSTP studios on University Avenue in Minneapolis and Saint Paul, Minnesota. The sidewalk leading to the building lies precisely on the city line, as does the central leg of the tower.
- St. Paul, Minnesota; United States
- Broadcast area: Minneapolis-St. Paul
- Frequency: 1500 kHz
- Branding: SKOR North

Programming
- Format: Sports
- Affiliations: ESPN Radio

Ownership
- Owner: Hubbard Broadcasting; (KSTP-AM, LLC)
- Sister stations: KSTC-TV, KSTP-FM, KSTP-TV, KTMY

History
- First air date: February 22, 1925; 101 years ago (current license dates from March 29, 1928)
- Former call signs: WAMD and KFOY (separately)
- Call sign meaning: St. Paul

Technical information
- Licensing authority: FCC
- Facility ID: 35641
- Class: A
- Power: 50,000 watts
- Transmitter coordinates: 45°1′32″N 93°2′38″W (day); 45°1′32″N 93°3′6″W (night)
- Repeater: 94.5 KSTP-HD2 (St. Paul)

Links
- Public license information: Public file; LMS
- Webcast: Listen Live
- Website: skornorth.com

KSTP (1500 kHz; SKOR North) is a commercial AM radio station licensed to Saint Paul, Minnesota. It is the flagship AM radio station of Hubbard Broadcasting, which owns dozens of television and radio stations in nine states. KSTP has a sports radio format and is the ESPN Radio Network affiliate for Minneapolis-St. Paul. Studios are on University Avenue in Minneapolis, shared with sister stations KSTP-FM, KSTP-TV, KTMY, and KSTC-TV.

The transmitter site is on U.S. Route 61 at Beam Avenue in Maplewood. KSTP runs the maximum power allowed for AM stations in the United States, 50,000 watts. By day it uses a single non-directional antenna. KSTP shares clear-channel, Class A status on 1500 AM with sister station WFED in Washington, D.C. At night, these two stations operate with directional antennas in order to mutually protect each other from interference. After sunset, KSTP uses a three-tower array, resulting in a reduced signal to eastern parts of the market.

== Programming ==
On weekdays, KSTP airs a local sports show Mackey and Judd. It is hosted by Phil Mackey, a former newspaper writer covering the Minnesota Twins, and Judd Zulgad, a former newspaper writer covering the Minnesota Vikings. The rest of the day, KSTP carries ESPN national programming.

== History ==
=== WAMD and KFOY ===
KSTP's start in 1928 was the product of a merger between two pioneering Twin Cities stations: WAMD ("Where All Minneapolis Dances") in Minneapolis, first licensed on February 16, 1925 to Stanley E. Hubbard, and KFOY, first licensed on March 12, 1924 to the Beacon Radio Service in St. Paul.

Following a few test transmissions, WAMD made its formal debut broadcast on February 22, 1925. (In later interviews Stanley Hubbard traced WAMD's start to April 1924.) It was located at the Marigold Dance Garden, and featured nightly "Midnight Frolics" broadcasts by the ballroom's orchestra. It is claimed that WAMD was the first radio station to be completely supported by running paid advertisements. Effective June 15, 1927, WAMD was assigned to 1330 kHz.

On November 11, 1927, WAMD's transmitter site at Oxboro Heath on Lyndale Avenue South burned down, two weeks after the station had been sold to the National Battery Company. An initial arrangement was made to carry WAMD's programs over WRHM (now WWTC), transmitting on WAMD's 1330 kHz frequency. Beginning on November 24, 1927, the WAMD broadcasts, still on 1330 kHz, were shifted to KFOY's facility in St. Paul. (At this time KFOY was assigned to 1050 kHz). The next day it was announced that National Battery had purchased KFOY, and as of December 1, 1927 both KFOY and WAMD were reassigned to 1350 kHz. WAMD continued making regular broadcasts until the end of March 1928, while KFOY, although it continued to be licensed for a few more months on a time-sharing basis with WAMD, ceased operations at this point.

=== National Battery Company ===
In mid-December 1927, the National Battery Company announced it had received permission from the Federal Radio Commission (FRC) to build a new station, with the call letters KSTP, operating from a transmitter site to be constructed three miles south of Wescott. The next month it was reported that the new station, still under construction, had been assigned to 1360 kHz. KSTP made its debut broadcast on March 29, 1928. Although technically it was a separate station from WAMD and KFOY, both of which were formally deleted on April 30, 1928, overall KSTP was treated as the direct successor to a consolidated WAMD and KFOY.

Hubbard became the merged station's general manager, acquiring controlling interest in 1941. A month after the merger, KSTP became an affiliate for the NBC Red Network. It remained with NBC for 46 years. On November 11, 1928, under the provisions of the FRC's General Order 40, KSTP was assigned to a "high-powered regional" frequency of 1460 kHz. The only other station assigned to this frequency was WTFF in Mount Vernon Hills, Virginia (later WJSV, now WFED, Washington, D.C.). On February 7, 1933, the FRC authorized KSTP to increase its daytime power to 25,000 watts. In 1938 and 1939 KSTP also operated a high-fidelity AM "experimental audio broadcasting station" Apex station, W9XUP, originally on 25,950 kHz and later on 26,150 kHz. In 1941, as part of the implementation of the North American Regional Broadcasting Agreement (NARBA), KSTP was assigned to its current "clear channel" frequency of 1500 kHz, with the provision that it and WJSV, as "Class I-B" stations, had to maintain directional antennas at night in order to mutually protect each other from interference.

Hubbard reportedly acquired an RCA TV camera in 1939, and started experimenting with television broadcasts. But World War II put a hold on the development of television. In 1948, with the war over, KSTP-TV became the first television station in Minnesota. With KSTP 1500 already associated with NBC Radio, KSTP-TV became an NBC Television Network affiliate. From 1946 to 1952, KSTP also had an FM counterpart. KSTP-FM 102.1 was only on the air four years. There were few radios equipped to receive FM signals in that era, and management decided to discontinue FM broadcasts.

=== MOR and Top 40 ===
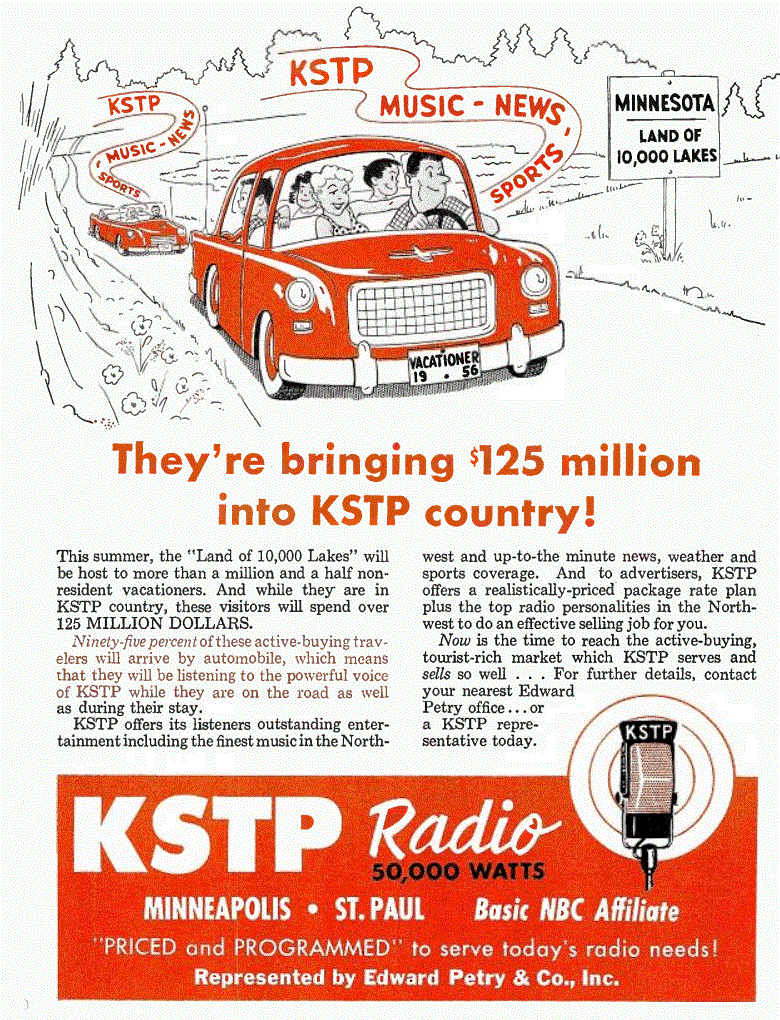
1956 station advertisement.

As network programming moved from radio to television, KSTP programmed a full service Middle of the Road (MOR) radio format, in the shadow of its chief competitor, CBS Radio affiliate 830 WCCO. In 1965, a new FM station, reviving the KSTP-FM call sign, was put on the air, largely simulcasting the AM station. But by the late 1960s, KSTP-FM began a separate format of beautiful music.

KSTP 1500 served as the radio flagship for the Minnesota Vikings football team from 1970 to 1975. In 1973, KSTP broke away from its longtime adult MOR sound and became one of four area stations at the time to program a Top 40 format. "15 KSTP, The Music Station" competed with Top 40 AM rivals WDGY 1130, KDWB 630 and later, WYOO 980. The competition would eventually shake itself out, with outrageous rocker WYOO leaving the format after being sold in 1976, and then the staid WDGY switching to country music the following year. As for uptempo hits station 15 KSTP, it went from a tight Top 40 format to leaning Adult Top 40 in 1978, to leaning Adult Contemporary in 1979, to evolving into a mix of adult contemporary and talk by 1980. In 1981, it officially shifted to all-talk. Most listening to Top 40 music, by this time, had moved to the FM band.

=== The Talk Station and success in the '90s ===
While it usually carried local hosts, in 1988 KSTP became one of Rush Limbaugh's first affiliates when his conservative talk show was rolled out for national syndication. The move was an instant success, quadrupling ratings in under a year. Following on the heels of Limbaugh's success, the station launched a daily talk show with Joe Soucheray in 1993 would eventually become Garage Logic. The next year, KSTP brought in future Congressman Jason Lewis to host evenings and ratings continued to skyrocket.

Carried on the backs of Limbaugh and Lewis, the station enjoyed the success seen by many right-leaning stations during the 90s. While its midday lineup was conservative, KSTP featured many left-leaning personalities, including Barbara Carlson, Tom Mischke, Turi Ryder and Don Vogel.

After almost a decade of success and at the peak of his ratings power, Lewis left for WBT (AM) in 2003 while #1 in his time slot., setting off a series of programming moves which led to a steady decline in ratings.

Sensing an opportunity, Clear Channel rebranded KTLK-FM as a conservative talk radio station by taking back the rights to Limbaugh and Sean Hannity and putting them head-to-head against KSTP. This radio war escalated when Lewis returned the Twin Cities in 2006 to compete against his former employer in afternoon drive.

In an unprecedented moved for Twin Cities media, on August 1, 2006, the station announced that it would pay the Minnesota Twins baseball team to become their flagship station with the start of the 2007 season. The Twins had been on rival WCCO (AM) since arriving in Minnesota in 1961. KSTP served as the flagship for the Twins until the end of the 2012 season, when games moved to 96.3 KTWN-FM (now KMWA).

=== Sports Radio and Decline ===
Unable to find a consistent voice after the loss of Lewis and Limbaugh, and following years of dwindling ratings and lackluster leadership, KSTP laid off the majority of their staff and abruptly switched to Sports Radio on February 15, 2010. With the surprise nature of the announcement, KSTP was forced to wait months to finalize their programming lineup while waiting for ESPN's contract with rival Clear Channel stations to expire. KSTP did not become an ESPN Radio affiliate until April 12, the same day that the Minnesota Twins opened their new ball park, Target Field.

On March 9, 2011, KSTP announced it would be the new flagship for the University of Minnesota Golden Gophers men's and women's basketball and men's ice hockey, ending a 68-year run on WCCO. KSTP lost the rights to KFXN-FM, which already aired Gopher football, in 2017.

On March 2, 2017, KSTP announced it would be the first radio broadcaster for pro-soccer team Minnesota United FC. The move brought live soccer action to 1500 AM.

On January 15, 2019, KSTP rebranded as "SKOR North" (a reference to the Minnesota Vikings team song/chant, "Skol, Vikings"). KSTP would air local programming between 12 noon and 7 pm. About a year later, in May 2020, KSTP suspended most of its local programming and laid off nearly all of its local staff. Station management cited the economic toll of the COVID-19 pandemic for the changes. Sports programming continues, primarily composed of ESPN radio network broadcasts.

In August 2023 the station ranked last in the market along with KUOM.

== Personalities ==
Notable hosts who have been on KSTP include John Hines, Jesse Ventura, Larry Carolla, Tom Barnard, Don Vogel, John MacDougall, Geoff Charles, Joe Soucheray, Patrick Reusse, James Lileks, Leigh Kamman, Chuck Knapp, Machine Gun Kelly, Charle Bush, Mark O'Connell and Paul Brand. Other syndicated hosts previously heard on KSTP include Bruce Williams, Larry King, Art Bell, and Owen Spann. Dan Stoneking was a sports talk show host in the 1980s.

== Previous logo ==
KSTP's final logo as news/talk station "AM 1500 KSTP", used until April 12, 2010; it was retained for the first two months as a sports station.

Preceded by 830 WCCO; 1961–2006	Radio Home of the Minnesota Twins; 2007–2012	Succeeded by 96.3 KTWN-FM; 2013–2017
