= KLIZ-FM =

- Brainerd, Minnesota; United States
- Broadcast area: Brainerd Lakes area
- Frequency: 107.5 MHz
- Branding: 107.5 KLZ The Power Loon

Programming
- Format: Classic rock
- Affiliations: United Stations Radio Networks

Ownership
- Owner: Hubbard Broadcasting, Inc.; (HBI Radio Brainerd/Wadena, LLC)
- Sister stations: KVBR, KLIZ, KBLB, KUAL-FM, WJJY-FM

History
- First air date: 1960

Technical information
- Licensing authority: FCC
- Facility ID: 28654
- Class: C1
- ERP: 100,000 watts
- HAAT: 107 meters (351 ft)
- Transmitter coordinates: 46.332°N 94.174°W
- Repeaters: 107.1 KTMY-HD3 Coon Rapids, MN

Links
- Public license information: Public file; LMS
- Webcast: Listen Live
- Website: theloon.com

KLIZ-FM (107.5 MHz, "The Power Loon") is a classic rock music formatted radio station serving the Brainerd Lakes area from Brainerd, Minnesota. Its owner is Hubbard Broadcasting, Inc.

KLIZ-FM is a sister station to KVBR 1340 (Business News/Talk), KLIZ 1380 (Sports), KBLB 93.3 (Country), KUAL-FM 103.5 (Oldies), WJJY-FM 106.7 (Adult Contemporary). All are located at 13225 Dogwood Drive, Baxter.

== History ==
KLIZ-FM was established as the FM counterpart to KLIZ (1380 AM) in Brainerd. A March 1961 U.S. Radio FM profile listed KLIZ-FM as active with 15,000 watts ERP, seven-county coverage, national representation by Walker-Rawalt, and programming described with abbreviations for semi-classical music, standards, news, classical music and sports.

KLIZ-FM was not originally assigned to its present 107.5 MHz channel. In 1975, the Federal Communications Commission described Brainerd as having two AM stations, KVBR and KLIZ, and one FM station, KLIZ-FM, then operating on Channel 239C. In the same proceeding, the FCC noted a separate pending proposal to substitute Channel 298 for Channel 239 at Brainerd and modify Brainerd Broadcasting Company's KLIZ-FM license to specify the new channel. The FCC also added Channel 294 as a second FM assignment for Brainerd. In 1978, Broadcasting reported that KLIZ-FM had been granted a construction-permit modification for 100,000 watts horizontal and vertical ERP, 350 feet HAAT, and remote-control operation. By 1985, trade listings identified KLIZ-FM as operating on 107.5 MHz with 100 kW and an antenna 350 feet above average terrain.

Brainerd Broadcasting Company sold KLIZ and KLIZ-FM to Sequel Communications in 1985 for $705,000, consisting of $680,000 in cash and the remainder in a non-compete agreement. The seller was owned by Earl R. Johnson, while Sequel was owned by Celltech Communications of Englewood, Colorado. Sequel sold KLIZ-AM-FM to CD Broadcasting Corp. in 1987 for $750,000. In 1989, the FCC granted an asset exchange in which Sioux Valley Broadcasting, principally owned by Robert Ingstad, acquired KLIZ-AM-FM from CD Broadcasting; the listing again described KLIZ-FM as operating on 107.5 MHz with 100 kW and 350 feet HAAT.

During the Ingstad period, KLIZ-FM's format and branding evolved toward the rock identity it would later retain. A Minnesota radio directory listed KLIZ-FM under Sioux Valley Broadcasting with an adult contemporary format, 100,000 watts, 350 feet HAAT, Associated Press wire service, and 24-hour operation. A 1991 FMedia! report associated the "KLZ, Minnesota's Power Loon" branding with Walker sister station KLLZ and noted that it simulcast KLIZ-FM 107.5 Brainerd. By January 1996, The M Street Journal listed KLIZ-FM as classic rock and reported that Jim Ingstad Broadcasting was selling nine northern Minnesota stations, including sports-formatted KLIZ and classic-rock KLIZ-FM in Brainerd, to Robert Kommerstad's Provident Investment Counsel.

Omni Broadcasting agreed in 2003 to buy Kommerstad Communications' Brainerd- and Wadena-area stations, including KLIZ-FM. NorthPine reported that the deal would give Omni two AM stations and four FM stations in the immediate Brainerd area after Omni sold KUAL-FM/101.5 in Crosby to Quarnstrom Media to comply with ownership limits. Omni's BL Broadcasting subsidiary had taken over the Brainerd stations by 2004.

Hubbard Broadcasting announced in November 2014 that it would buy 16 radio stations in north-central Minnesota from companies owned by Lou Buron for $8 million. The stations included KLIZ-FM, along with sister stations in Brainerd, Wadena, Bemidji and Alexandria; Hubbard said it expected no programming or personnel changes at the stations. The FCC granted the assignment of KLIZ-FM's license from BL Broadcasting, Inc. to HBI Radio Brainerd/Wadena, LLC on January 26, 2015.

KLIZ-FM has continued under Hubbard as classic rock "107.5 The Power Loon". Hubbard describes the station as serving the Brainerd Lakes area from Brainerd and branding itself as "The Brainerd Lakes Home for the BEST in Classic Rock!" NorthPine lists the station as a 100 kW class C1 facility using the branding "KLZ-FM, The Power Loon". In 2025, NorthPine reported that Hubbard had begun simulcasting "The Power Loon" on the HD3 signal of KTMY/107.1 in the Minneapolis–St. Paul market.
