= David Dahl =

David or Dave Dahl may refer to:

- David P. Dahl (born 1937), American organist and co-founder of Olympic Organ Builders
- Dave Dahl (entrepreneur) (born 1963), American baker, creator of Dave's Killer Bread
- David Dahl (baseball) (born 1994), American baseball player
- Dave Dahl (meteorologist), American meteorologist
- Dave Dahl, American researcher and technologist, co-founder of Web Associates (later called LEVEL Studios), Placemark One and Cryptografx

== See also ==
- Dahl (disambiguation)
