= CONUS Communications =

American company

- Industry: Satellite trucks
- Founded: 1984
- Headquarters: United States

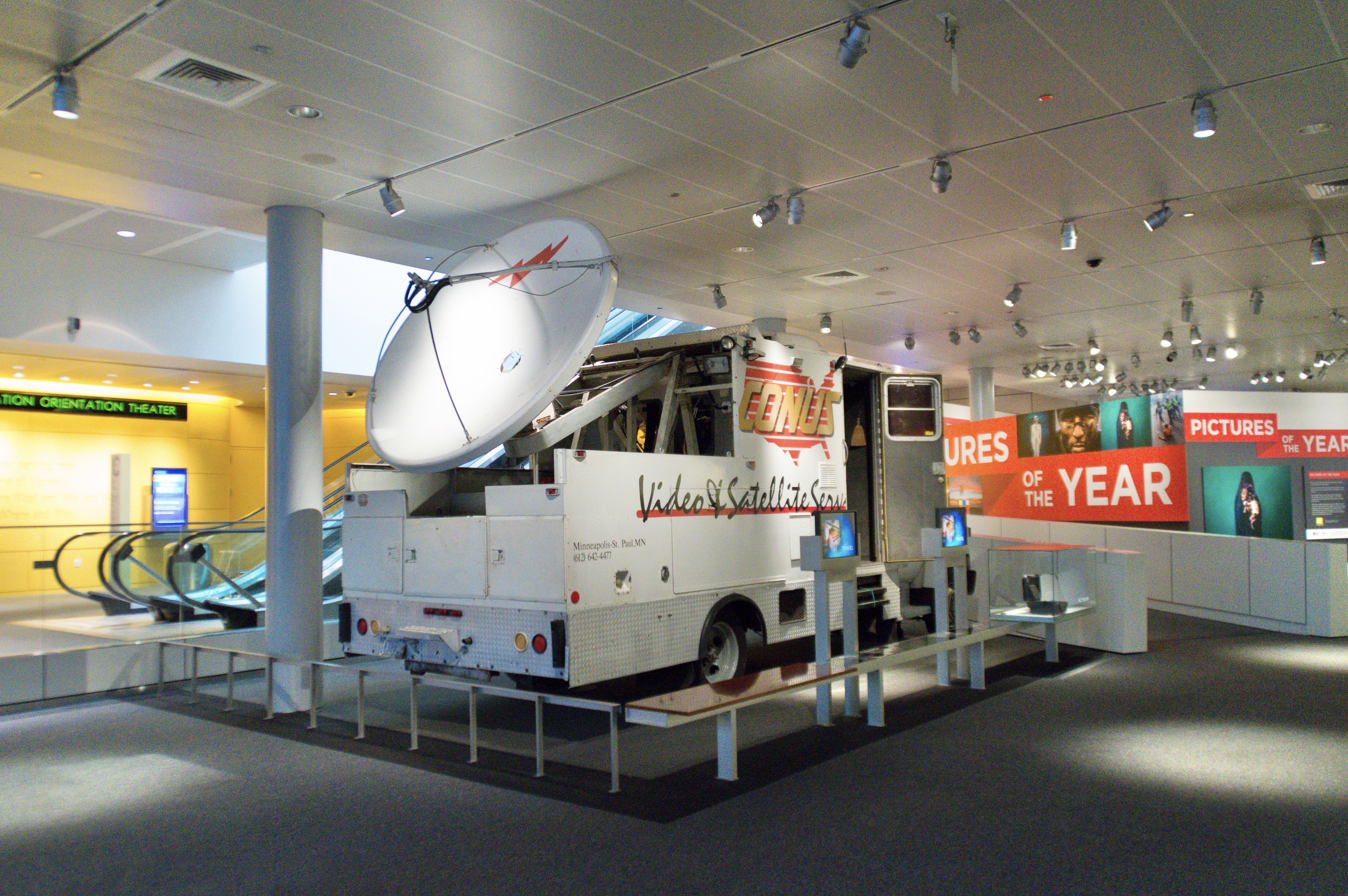
The first CONUS satellite truck, CONUS 1, on display at the Newseum

CONUS Communications was an American company specializing in the sale of satellite trucks for remote electronic news gathering, as well as a cooperative and news exchange among television stations. CONUS was set up by Hubbard Broadcasting and operated from 1984 until 2002. In addition to the news exchange, its service was the backbone of All News Channel, and it produced the syndicated program First Business.

== History ==
In 1984, Stanley E. Hubbard and his Hubbard Broadcasting founded CONUS—taking its name from an acronym for "continental United States"—as an intended cooperative of stations and leased a transponder on the SBS 3 satellite. The goal was to make satellite newsgathering (SNG) attaintable for individual television stations at a lower cost and increase the capabilities of local television newsrooms. Stations were invited to buy an equity stake at a cost of $255,000 in large markets or $170,000 in smaller markets, while Newstar satellite vehicles cost between $250,000 and $330,000 each.

Hubbard's KSTP-TV in St. Paul, Minnesota, had developed the Newstar technology. It had previously used the Ku band uplinks and trucks to feed hockey games in Iowa back to the station, and in March 1984, the first pilot Newstar vehicle fed KSTP coverage of a murder trial in Ivanhoe, Minnesota. Ivanhoe, at 150 miles (240 km) from the Twin Cities, was much further than the 30-mile (48 km) range associated with standard microwave links for electronic newsgathering. Ku band signals at the time had a reputation for rain fade issues that could make reception difficult. Stanley Hubbard later touted that Newstar allowed local stations to bypass the networks in covering news events; Hubbard, a noted conservative, told a luncheon in 1986 and making reference to East Coast bias, "In New York ... all those ... ladies and gentlemen who work for the three networks eat at the same restaurants, they all read The New York Times and The Washington Post ... They all think alike." Hubbard Communications (HubCom), a Hubbard subsidiary based in St. Petersburg, Florida, built the first CONUS trucks using Ford E-350 chassis and fitted with 2.4-meter (7 ft 10 in) dishes.

The first four stations to sign up were Hubbard's KSTP-TV and KOB-TV in Albuquerque, New Mexico, as well as KRON-TV in San Francisco and WBTV in Charlotte. There were 10 stations signed up by December 1984; 23 by July 1985, of which 18 were limited partners in CONUS; and 34 by January 1986. In January 1986, CONUS took control of two transponders on the new Satcom K-2 satellite. The CONUS presence on K-2 was noteworthy because its developer, RCA, offered free receiving dishes for K-2 to any station in the United States, and over 500 accepted the offer.

The rise of CONUS spurred action by the networks as well as network owned-and-operated stations. HubCom built SNG trucks for WLS-TV in Chicago, owned by ABC, and NBC's WRC-TV in Washington. The networks also launched their own newsgathering cooperatives, such as ABC NewsOne, and provided subsidies for stations to buy satellite trucks. CBS executive Tony Malara noted that the goal of that network's satellite news plan was to keep its affiliates looking to CBS News: "It is necessary for CBS to be the place where affiliates turn for these services and resources. We must not let them go to Conus, Westinghouse, FNN." CNN also developed a competing news service, called Newsbeam. NBC used a HubCom-designed "flight pack" consisting of eight suitcases to cover the 1986 Philippine presidential election.

CONUS enabled direct station-to-station sharing of news stories including live coverage. For instance, after the Loma Prieta earthquake struck in 1989, Jim Crandell of CONUS member KTXL in Sacramento, California, found himself doing some 30 live reports for television stations across the United States and Japan's Fuji Television. Staff from CONUS and some 30 stations and a satellite truck from KHJ-TV in Los Angeles traveled to Northern California to provide earthquake coverage for CONUS members.

In later years, it had about 100 members with a cap at 125, as well as clients in Europe, Australia, and Japan. The operation fed 500 to 700 stories a week from its St. Paul headquarters and regional hubs across the U.S. As other newsfeeds began offering more services, CONUS's strength was seen in the customized reporting it did for client stations.

== Other services ==
CONUS Washington Direct, a service providing live coverage of White House press briefings and other events in Washington, D.C., launched in September 1985. The next year, it partnered with the Associated Press to launch TV Direct, a more comprehensive newsfeed package available on a non-exclusive basis to TV stations. The partnership was unwound in 1993.

A separate division, CONUS Satellite Services, provided satellite time and facilities, including the use of Newstar trucks, for other clients, including political candidates. It was formed to provide additional utilization of the satellite time and transponders CONUS's news service needed to handle the high demand for content during evening news times. Later known as CONUS Production and Satellite Services, clients included corporations, Fox Sports, and the NBA.

=== All News Channel and First Business ===
In 1989, Hubbard and Viacom Network Enterprises partnered to launch a television channel modeled after all-news radio, All News Channel, run by Conus from Minneapolis. By this time, CONUS had 140 members. It expanded into syndicating the national program First Business and internationally by acquiring London-based Phoenix Television Ltd. in 1999.

CONUS provided engineering support to Hubbard's United States Satellite Broadcasting (USSB), which launched in 1994. It built the system's uplink center. All News Channel was offered on USSB's basic service.

== Shutdown ==
By the late 1990s, some stations were reconsidering their investment in CONUS, due to competing services such as CNN Newsource and cost. In 2000, ABC, CBS, and Fox instituted a pooled news share service among their stations, known as Network News Service, increasing pressure on CONUS. Amid industry cutbacks and an advertising market slowdown, as well as the increased offerings from the networks and consolidation at local TV stations, CONUS shuttered most of its operations on September 20, 2002. At its closure, it employed 165 people. Though Stanley S. Hubbard noted that the declining market was "a shame", he highlighted the company's impact on the industry: "Everybody has a satellite truck. They all copied CONUS. We changed the way news is gathered in the world." Some news directors were disappointed at losing CONUS, which they believed had low rates and good customer service. The closure included All News Channel, which ceased programming on September 30, 2002. At the time, CONUS clients for satellite truck services included ABC, NBC, and Fox News. The satellite services division was sold to three former employees and renamed Arctek Satellite Productions.

First Business would continue on under the direction of Weigel Broadcasting, which already produced most of the Chicago-specific, continuing until December 2014, with its lineage continuing today through Business First AM with Angela Miles, who was the final anchor of First Business.
