= Centennial High School (Minnesota) =

Coordinates: 45.1541000°N 93.1489000°W

- 4707 North Road; Circle Pines, Minnesota 55014; United States

Information
- Type: Public high school
- Established: 1958
- School district: Centennial School District
- Principal: Tom Breuning
- Faculty: 92.66 FTEs
- Grades: 9–12
- Enrollment: 2,067 (as of 2024–2025)
- Student to teacher ratio: 22.31
- Colors: Scarlet and Ivory
- Nickname: Cougars
- Rivals: Blaine Bengals
- Website: highschool.isd12.org

Centennial High School is a public high school located in Blaine, Minnesota, United States. The mailing address uses the Circle Pines, Minnesota Post office. The school services students in the 9th through 12th grade in the cities of Lexington, Blaine, Centerville, Lino Lakes and Circle Pines, as part of the Centennial School District.

Included on campus are a sports arena for indoor soccer and hockey, football and track field, several baseball and softball diamonds, soccer fields, and an indoor swimming pool. There are three pay-to-park lots for students who use their own vehicles to travel to school.

As of the 2014–15 school year, the school had an enrollment of 1,994 students and 97.5 classroom teachers (on an FTE basis), for a student–teacher ratio of 20.5:1. There were 199 students (10.0% of enrollment) eligible for free lunch and 89 (4.5% of students) eligible for reduced-cost lunch.

== Courses ==
Centennial offers a wide variety of courses, including Psychology, Sociology, Honors Botany, Honors Zoology, Photography, Video Production, Anatomy and Physiology, multiple PLTW classes, Architectural Drafting, Interior Design, Marketing, AP classes, CIS classes, 21st Century Law, and Commercial Graphic Design.

== Sports ==
Sports offered by the school include cheerleading, swimming, soccer, basketball, volleyball, cross country, downhill skiing, tennis, hockey, football, wrestling, baseball, softball, lacrosse, track, and gymnastics. In 1995, Centennial retired their former name (Centennial Chiefs) and replaced it with the Centennial Cougars.

=== Football ===
In 2023, the Centennial football team won the 6A Minnesota State High School League football tournament, ending with a 12-1 record.

=== Dance team ===
The dance team has been coached by Sarah Austin for 10 years. Raplhie Ermantraut started the team in 1958. The team competes in high kick and jazz competitions and invitationals. Competitions held for varsity and junior varsity levels. The team participated in the state competition in 2009, 2011, 2012, 2015, 2016, and 2017.

=== Boys' hockey ===
The 2004 boys hockey team finished the season with a 30−1−0 record, and won their first ever state championship by shutting out Academy of Holy Angels (2-0), Wayzata High School (3-0), and Moorhead High School (1−0) in the state championship in their first-ever appearance. The team won their championship over Moorhead in front of a crowd of more than 17,000 at the Xcel Energy Center, home of the NHL Minnesota Wild. This marked the first time a goalie has ever carried a shutout throughout an entire state tournament in its 60-year history. Four players were named to the Class AA All-Tournament Team.

=== Girls' basketball ===
In 2009, the girls' basketball team made it to the finals with a 29−3 record and placed second to Minneapolis South.

=== Wrestling ===
The Centennial wrestling team qualified for the state tournament in '00−'01, '01−'02, '02−'03, ' 04−'05, '05−'06, '07−'08, and '08−'09. In 01−02, the team ousted Owatonna 30−27 to reach the state finals, eventually falling to Apple Valley High School, 50−12 to take 2nd place in the state.

== Controversies ==
In March 2021, an Asian-American student released screenshots of two students sending her racist text messages. A walkout protest on March 29, 2021, took place, where students voiced their concerns about racism at the school.

== Notable alumni ==
- Kye Allums (2008) - former George Washington University basketball player, first openly transgender player in NCAA history
- Chris Anderson (2010) - baseball player drafted in the first round of the 2013 MLB draft by the Los Angeles Dodgers, currently with the AA Tulsa Drillers
- Dave Dahl (1972) - former KSTP-TV meteorologist
- Gabbie Hughes (2018) - Professional Women's Hockey League and United States women's national ice hockey team player.
- Tracie McBride (1993) - United States Army soldier who was kidnapped, raped and murdered on February 18, 1995.
- Tyler Pitlick (2009) - National Hockey League player with the Dallas Stars, selected by the Edmonton Oilers in the 2nd round (31st overall) of the 2010 NHL entry draft
- Kaitlin Young (2004) - former professional mixed martial artist
- Khyah Harper (2020) - Professional soccer player for Gotham FC
