= Glacial history of Minnesota =

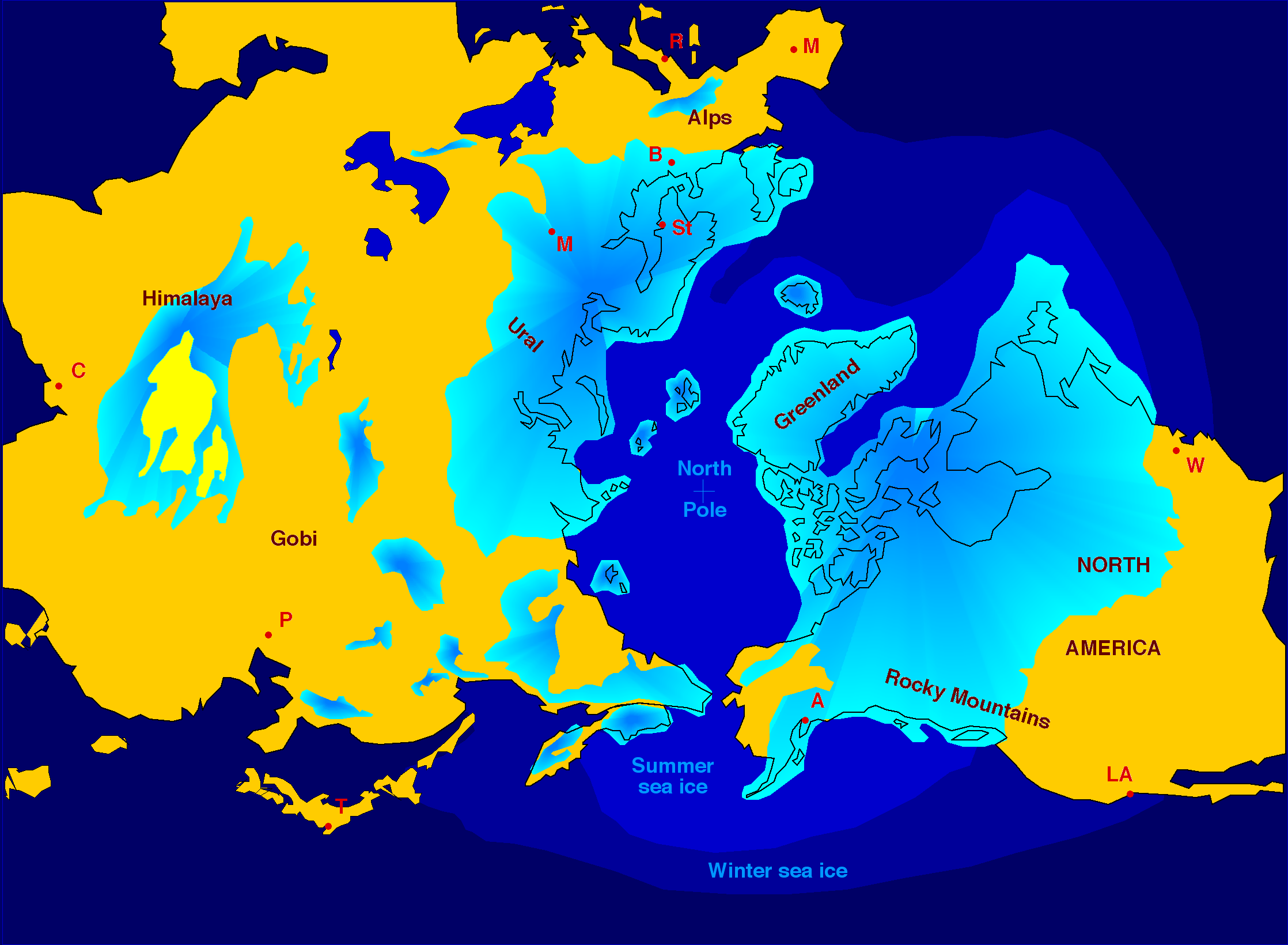
Northern Hemisphere glaciation during the last ice ages. The creation of 3 to 4 kilometres (1.9 to 2.5 mi) thick ice sheets caused a global sea level drop of about 120 m (390 ft)

Diagram of glacial plucking and abrasion

The glacial history of Minnesota is most defined since the onset of the last glacial period, which ended some 10,000 years ago. Within the last million years, most of the Midwestern United States and much of Canada were covered at one time or another with an ice sheet. This continental glacier had a profound effect on the surface features of the area over which it moved. Vast quantities of rock and soil were scraped from the glacial centers to its margins by slowly moving ice and redeposited as drift or till. Much of this drift was dumped into old preglacial river valleys, while some of it was heaped into belts of hills (terminal moraines) at the margin of the glacier. The chief result of glaciation has been the modification of the preglacial topography by the deposition of drift over the countryside. However, continental glaciers possess great power of erosion and may actually modify the preglacial land surface by scouring and abrading rather than by the deposition of the drift.

The marks of glaciation vastly altered Minnesota's topography. Probably the most significant change was in the character and extent of the drainage. In preglacial times, there is reason to believe that most of the rainwater or meltwater from snow was quickly carried back to the ocean. Today, much of the precipitation is retained temporarily on the surface in the lakes. Streams meander from lake to lake, and only part of the total precipitation is carried away by the rivers. Such topography could be described as immature because the streams have not yet been able to establish themselves into a network that quickly and efficiently drains the land. The Mississippi River has cut a deep valley below St. Anthony Falls, but even the waters of this large river do not flow freely to the ocean because of Lake Pepin, which acts as a storage basin for some of the water. Streams have been actively engaged in their erosive work only for the last 10,000 years, the estimated length of time since the last glacier began its final retreat. This time span is relatively insignificant compared to the long history of the Earth.

== Sequence of glacial events ==
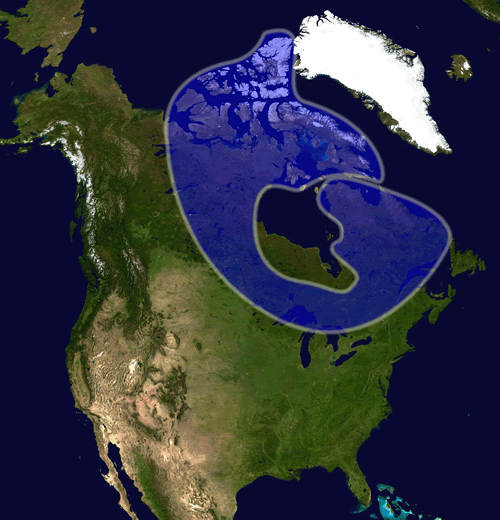
Canadian Shield.

Minnesota has been covered, at least in part, by a glacier numerous times during the Quaternary ice age. In order of increasing age, these advances took place during the Wisconsin Episode and Illinoian stages; prior to this continental ice sheets advanced into and retreated from Minnesota multiple times during the Pre-Illinoian Stage.

The ice moved into Minnesota at different times from three glacial centers, the Labradorian center in northern Quebec and Labrador; the Patrician center, just southwest of Hudson Bay; and the Keewatin center, northwest of Hudson Bay.

Deposits left by the continental ice sheets advancing from these three centers reflect the characteristics of the rocks over which they passed. The Keewatin ice encountered the Cretaceous limestones and shales of Manitoba and the Red River Valley, whereas the Patrician and Labradorian ice moved over iron-rich Pre-Cambrian crystalline rocks of the Canadian Shield.

=== Pre-Wisconsin Episode glaciation ===
There are few areas in which the earlier drifts from the glacial deposits of the Pre-Ilionian or Illinoian stages are exposed at the surface. The extreme southeastern and southwestern portions of Minnesota (Driftless Area) have extensive areas of pre-Wisconsin drifts, but they are masked almost everywhere by surficial covering of loess (wind-blown silt). Furthermore, these regions of older drift are maturely drained, because the streams have had a longer time to evolve into an efficient drainage system compared with the streams flowing in areas covered by younger glacial deposits. Howard Hobbs has proposed that the Pre-Illinoian glacial deposits in southeastern Minnesota are actually younger Illinoian glacial deposits.

== Changes in the course of continental rivers ==
As the ice sheets moved into the central portion of North America, the rivers that used to flow from the Rocky Mountains to the northeast into the Arctic Ocean found their valleys choked with ice. The rivers had to divert around the farthest extensions of the ice. When the ice retreated, the new valleys eroded into the landscape kept the rivers from moving back to their old positions.

== Wisconsin Episode Glaciation ==
The Wisconsin glacial episode, the most recent glacial period, has been subdivided into four substages, each representing an advance and retreat of the ice. The substages, named from the oldest to the youngest, are the Iowan, Tazewell, Cary and Mankato. Only the Iowan, Cary and Mankato are recognized in Minnesota, but studies indicate that the Tazewell drift may be present in southwestern Minnesota.

The Iowan drift occurs extensively at the surface only in southwestern and southeastern Minnesota, and contains few, if any, lakes because of the relatively mature surface drainage. The Tazewell drift in the southwestern Minnesota is devoid of lakes; in fact, the criterion of drainage was used by Robert Ruhe to distinguish Tazewell from Cary drifts.

Nearly all of the lakes in Minnesota are found within the borders of the Cary and Mankato drifts. For this reason, it is necessary to consider in some detail the nature and distribution of these two drift sheets.

=== Cary substage ===
The glaciers that advanced out of the northeastern portion of Canada were of sufficient thickness to produce significant erosion in northeastern Minnesota. Because the affected area reached somewhat south of Minneapolis, it is called the "Minneapolis lobe". The Minneapolis lobe is characteristically red and sandy because of red sandstone and shale source rocks to the north and northeast; it may be recognized as well by pebbles of basalt, gabbro, red syenite, felsite and iron formation from northeastern Minnesota.

Ground moraine with uncharacteristic reddish iron-rich sediments extended from St. Cloud, Minnesota, back northeastward. The glaciers produced a set of terminal moraines which extend from northwest of St. Cloud into the Twin Cities and up into central Wisconsin. They deposited reddish sands and gravels westward and southward in outwash plains.

=== Mankato substage ===
With the retreat of the Patrician ice, the stage was set for the final phase of the Wisconsin Episode glaciation in Minnesota. The last major advance of the continental glacier in Minnesota culminated in a lobe that reached as far south as Des Moines, Iowa. The glacial movement from the northwest was from a more distant source than ice from the northwest. The subsequent glacier that moved into Minnesota was quite thin and unable to cause much erosion. The Des Moines lobe produced a northeast-moving projection known as the Grantsburg sublobe. Also protruding from the main Keewatin ice dome was the St. Louis sublobe. The drift of these ice lobes is generally in late Wisconsin time. The sediment transported by the Mankato glacier is colored tan to buff and is clay-rich and calcareous because of shale and limestone source rocks to the northwest. The Superior lobe also developed during Mankato time and advanced as far west as Aitkin County, Minnesota.

The Grantsburg sublobe effectively blocked the drainage of the Mississippi River from north of St. Cloud southeastward through the Twin Cities. The outwash carrying large quantities of sand was diverted overland to the east around the sublobe. No true drainage valley was produced; instead, multiple small streams flowed toward the northeast depositing their overloads of sand as they went. This produced a roughly triangular sandy outwash region called the Anoka Sand Plain, reaching from St. Cloud to the Twin Cities up to the northeast to Grantsburg, Wisconsin.

== Lake formation ==
=== Kettle lakes ===
Landscape produced by a receding glacier.

As glaciers advanced and retreated through Minnesota, some of the ice that stagnated was more difficult to melt than other areas. The glaciers continued to deposit sediments around and sometimes on top of these isolated ice blocks. As the ice blocks melted, they left behind depressions in the landscape. The depressions filled with snowmelt and rainwater producing kettle lakes.

Kettle lakes may be formed within the ground moraine region behind the terminal moraines. They can be of any size and their shorelines can be composed of anything from clay to sand to boulders. In a terminal moraine region, the kettles are fairly small but deep, to fit between the moraine's steep and hilly ridges. If the ice had advanced outward and then retreated leaving behind an outwash, kettles may have formed. Outwash kettle lakes are usually shallow and their numbers are much smaller than in other glaciated regions. The abundant sand quickly can fill in the depressions and composes most of the beaches of these lakes.

Because Minnesota has had glacial movements into the state from both the northeast and northwest, the landscape has been modified by overlapping glacial regions. For example, an outwash plain from the Cary glacier may have a newer cover of ground moraine from the Mankato glacier, or a Cary ground moraine may have been subsequently covered over by Mankato outwash.

The majority of lakes in the world are kettle lakes produced by glacial activity. In Minnesota, the majority of kettles lakes reside in ground moraine and terminal moraine areas.

=== Bedrock erosion lakes ===
In northeastern Minnesota, the glaciers were thousands of feet thick. As the glaciers moved through the area they eroded large quantities of rock away. Ice itself is not very abrasive, but by picking up and moving pieces of rock it was able to scrape away softer underlying materials. Volcanic rocks underlie the area. Along the Rove region of the Arrowhead Region, there are multiple tilted layers of volcanic rocks interspersed with layers of shale; the shalelayers are softer than the volcanic basalt. As the glaciers eroded the materials, the shales were removed. The topography in the Rove region alternates hills (composed of diabase) and valleys (former shale layers); these hills and valley orient in a west to east direction. Many of these valleys are now lakes. Because the lakes are oriented west-east, visitors to the Rove region think that the ice moved in an east-west direction. Glacial striations (scratches) show that the ice moved from north-to-south, perpendicular to the orientation of the lakebeds themselves.

Adjacent to the Rove area Lake Superior's basin resides in a billion-year-old trough which was caused by the Midcontinent Rift. Preglacially the depression had been filled with eroded shales. The thousands of feet of glacial ice eroded away a large amount of the shale. The ice was so thick that it scoured the sandstone down to depths of 700 ft (210 m) below sea level. The present Lake Superior is the single largest freshwater lake in area in the world.

=== Glacial lakes ===
About 18,000 years ago, the Laurentide Ice Sheet began to melt and retreat. As the Mankato ice shrank meltwaters became ponded in several places along the margin of the glacier. Some of these lakes covered several hundred thousand square miles and have left a definite imprint on the topography. All of them have since been drained by natural force or have been shrunk considerably from their original size.

==== Glacial Lake Duluth ====
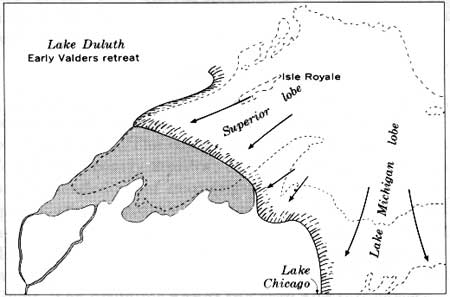
Glacial Lake Duluth

Glacial Lake Duluth is the body of water that formed at the southwestern margin of the Superior lobe and occupied a much larger area than the present Lake Superior. Its shorelines stood nearly 148 meters above the level of its modern successor, Lake Superior. During its early history Lake Duluth drained into the Mississippi River down the St. Croix River Valley. There were two outlets, one along the Kettle and Nemadji Rivers in Minnesota and another to the east along the Bois Brule River in Wisconsin. Later, however, when the Superior lobe had retreated farther to the northeast, the waters of Lake Duluth merged with those in the Michigan and Huron basins, and the southern outlets were abandoned in favor of a lower one on the east end of Lake Superior. The Kettle River no longer drains Lake Superior, but resides in a large valley, which itself could not have produced with its present discharge. The Nemadji and Bois Brule Rivers actually flow northward toward Lake Superior through the eastern proglacial outlet. Even though vast amounts of water flowed over the southern rim of Lake Superior, the Bois Brule River outlet was never scoured deep enough to remove a continental divide at the Bois Brule River's headwaters.

=== Proglacial lakes ===
==== Glacial Lake Agassiz ====
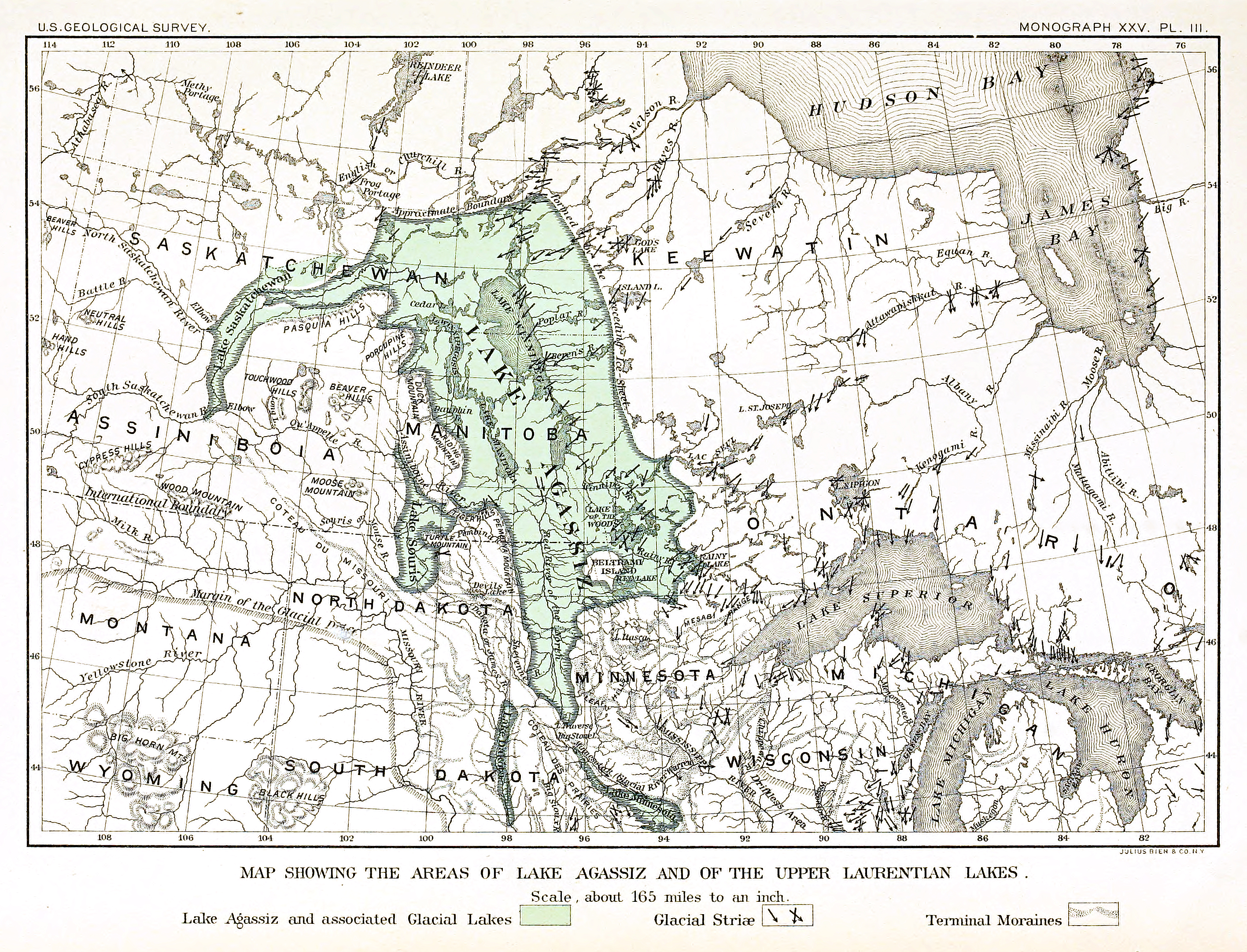
An early map of the extent of Lake Agassiz (by 19th century geologist Warren Upham). This map is now believed to underestimate the extent of the region once overlain by Lake Agassiz.

The largest of all the proglacial lakes was Lake Agassiz, a small part of which occupied the present Red River Valley of Minnesota and North Dakota. Glaciers to the north blocked the natural northward drainage of the areas. As the ice melted, a proglacial lake developed southward of the ice. The water overflowed the continental divide at Browns Valley, Minnesota; drained through the Traverse Gap and cut the present Minnesota River valley. The amount of discharge was staggering. It helped the adjacent Mississippi River to form a very large valley in the southeastern Minnesota.

The river that drained from Lake Agassiz is called the Glacial River Warren. It flowed over the top of a recessional moraine at Browns Valley. As the water eroded away the glacial deposits, the level in the lake dropped. Eventually enough large boulders were left behind that a boulder pavement was produced, which inhibited further downward cutting. The lake level was thus stabilized for a while. During the few decades when the level was constant, waves on the lake produced noticeable beaches along the shoreline. Glacial outwash was also being deposited on the bottom of the lake. Eventually the boulders at the lake outlet were eroded downstream and the river then could erode downward through a mix of sediment sizes. Again, a boulder pavement formed and, as before, the lake level stabilized at a lower level, again forming another set of beaches.

After further retreat of the ice into Canada, lower outlets were uncovered to Hudson Bay, and the Minnesota Valley outlet was abandoned. The continental divide at Browns Valley become the headwaters for the north flowing Red River of the North and southeast flowing tributary of the Mississippi River, the Minnesota River.

During its existence, Lake Agassiz may have been the largest freshwater lake to ever have existed. The lakebed composed of lake muds and silts is one of the flattest regions of Earth and is extremely fertile. No bedrock erosion lakes exist there because the ice was too thin to erode. No kettle lakes are found on the lakebed because lakebed deposits would have filled their depressions.

== See also ==
- Illinoian Stage
- Last glacial period
- Laurentide Ice Sheet
- Pleistocene
- Quaternary glaciation
