= All News Channel =

American satellite television news channel, 1989–2002

- Logo used from 1994 to 2002.
- Type: News channel; Syndication service
- Country: United States
- Broadcast area: Nationwide
- Headquarters: St. Paul, Minnesota

Programming
- Language: English
- Picture format: 480i (SDTV)

Ownership
- Owner: CONUS Communications; (Viacom and Hubbard Broadcasting)
- Sister channels: Ovation

History
- Launched: November 30, 1989; 36 years ago
- Closed: September 30, 2002; 24 years ago (12 years and 10 months)

All News Channel (ANC) was an American satellite television news channel and broadcast syndication service operated as a joint venture between Viacom and CONUS Communications, itself a division of Hubbard Broadcasting. Launched on November 30, 1989 and operating until September 30, 2002, its format consisted of half-hourly rotating newscasts presented in a rolling news wheel schedule, incorporating story packages gathered from in-house reporting staffs and sourced from local television stations that maintained agreements with CONUS to supply content for the cooperative satellite news video-sharing service.

ANC primarily syndicated its news programming in blocks of varying length, determined by each carrier station, to local television stations across the United States. The channel was also offered to pay television providers across the country from its inception, though beginning in 1994, it was carried mainly by direct-broadcast satellite providers United States Satellite Broadcasting (USSB) and, after its 1999 acquisition of USSB from Hubbard, DirecTV. All News Channel was headquartered in St. Paul, Minnesota at the studios of Hubbard's flagship television and radio stations, including KSTP-TV (channel 5), the ABC affiliate for the Minneapolis–St. Paul market.

== History ==
All News Channel was launched on November 30, 1989; it was co-founded by Hubbard and Viacom as a joint venture between divisions of the respective partners, news wire service CONUS Communications (CONUS being an acronym for Continental United States) and satellite programming distributor Showtime Satellite Services. CONUS was a news video-sharing cooperative service for local television stations nationwide, particularly those affiliated with a major broadcast network; nearly all of ANC's video came from these stations, who in turn utilized satellite news-gathering trucks that had been invented, built and sold by Hubbard beginning in 1984. (The channel's use of video and story packages from local CONUS client stations lent credence to the slogan that it used from 1994 to 2001, "News Straight from America's Hometowns".) CONUS also maintained a small news bureau in Washington, D.C. It was the second nationwide challenger to established cable news channel CNN after the Satellite News Channel (SNC), as well as the first since SNC folded in 1983.

All News Channel, like many other cable networks, struggled with cable carriage throughout its existence; indeed, the service was mainly targeted at home satellite dish users, while sales material for ANC largely focused on the ability for broadcast stations to use ANC programming to fill holes in their schedules, as a replacement for programming blacked out by syndication exclusivity restrictions, or as part of localized news services. Beginning in 1992, ANC switched to an all-barter syndication model (having been previously offered on a cash-plus-barter basis) via All-American Television, in part as a defensive strategy against network-supplied overnight newscasts. The channel's reach was boosted on June 17, 1994, when Hubbard Broadcasting launched United States Satellite Broadcasting (USSB), a direct-broadcast satellite provider that mainly offered premium and basic cable networks owned by Viacom and then-Time Warner subsidiary Home Box Office, Inc., which included ANC as the service's only option for news; CNN and other news channels were carried on DirecTV, the proprietor of the Digital Satellite System (DSS) that USSB also utilized to transmit its services.

All News Channel/CONUS also produced news content for third parties. Beginning in January 1991 as a response to the Gulf War, All News Channel produced daily news updates for premium cable channel Showtime (at the time, owned by ANC co-parent Viacom and also partially responsible for management and distribution of ANC through its Showtime Satellite Services unit) that aired during its prime time promotional breaks. The channel also produced the USA Update news interstitials for USA Network from 1993 to 2000 (assuming production responsibilities from Group W's Newsfeed Network satellite video service and Philadelphia station KYW-TV, which had produced the segments since their January 1989 debut, as a consequence of corporate cutbacks that prompted Newsfeed's closure and asset sale to CNN). From 1991 to 1994, VH1 (also owned by Viacom) carried ANC-produced interstitials during the morning music video block Hits, News & Weather. ANC/CONUS also produced long-form programs for broadcast syndication including the morning financial news program First Business (which saw its national distribution rights transferred to MGM Television shortly after the channel's shutdown), The American Times (a daily evening newscast that was primarily carried nationally on America One) and On the Money (a financial analysis program intended for weekend timeslots).

Upon the completion of Hubbard’s $1.3-billion sale of USSB to then-DirecTV parent Hughes Entertainment, All News Channel—along with the remainder of USSB’s channel suite—migrated to DirecTV’s channel lineup on July 1, 1999; the deal included a long-term programming agreement that allowed DirecTV to distribute up to three Hubbard-owned channels, including ANC and sister arts/culture network Ovation (an additional channel, Reelz, was added in 2006). ANC benefited in part by being the only news channel on the USSB satellite service, though arguably any advantage enjoyed by ANC was undercut by the fact that many USSB subscribers also subscribed to DirecTV and vice-versa; after USSB merged into DirecTV, it was then one of six such channels (alongside CNN, Headline News, Fox News, MSNBC and Newsworld International), and it no longer had the explicit backing of its satellite provider.

All News Channel was never profitable throughout its history and could not withstand the challenges of MSNBC and Fox News Channel (both launched in 1996), which pushed ANC to fifth place in the ratings—behind Headline News—among all cable news channels. (Ironically, then-News Corporation CEO Rupert Murdoch made an offer to buy ANC and CONUS from the Hubbards, who would ultimately refuse, to serve as the cornerstone for what would become FNC.) CONUS itself began to be squeezed out of the newsgathering marketplace by rival CNN Newsource, as well as the major networks' own affiliate news services (ABC NewsOne, CBS Newspath and NBC News Channel).

As a result, Hubbard announced the closure of CONUS' newsgathering operations in the fall of 2002 (by which time CONUS only had 100 or so affiliates, down from a self-imposed limit of 125 in 1999); Hubbard continued to maintain their videotape archives and sell transponder time. (A trio of ex-CONUS employees then partnered to buy some of CONUS' assets, including a satellite truck, to form ARCTEK Satellite Productions in January 2003.) The closure of CONUS also meant the closure of All News Channel, which shut down on September 30, 2002, with veteran anchor Stan Turner thanking those watching and those behind the scenes; stations that carried ANC have since replaced the channel's programming with syndicated and/or paid programming (especially common with NBC stations as the network no longer has an overnight newscast since NBC Nightside ended in 1998) or have expanded their clearance of overnight news programs supplied by their affiliated network.

== Format ==
ANC aired up to five live half-hour newscasts each day (airing at 4:00 a.m., 8:00 a.m., noon, 4:00 p.m., and 10:00 p.m. Central Time, with an occasional sixth at 4:30 a.m.), with each edition being repeated until the next live newscast aired; however, exceptions to this set scheduling were made for major breaking news stories, with updates being regularly incorporated into the newscasts as new information became available.

Like CNN Headline News and Satellite News Channel before it, ANC's newscasts utilized a news wheel format, which was intended to allow viewers to receive updated information on national and international headlines at any time throughout the day. This format featured national and world headlines at the top of the hour (:00/:30); a national news summary (titled "Across America") at :08/:38 after the hour; national weather forecasts (including a rundown of daily forecasts for 20—later, 15—U.S. cities, accompanied in later years by a notable weather headline and a daily summary of national temperature extremes) at :15/:45 after; consumer reports and stock market summaries at :17/47 after; sports headlines and scores (during the evening and overnight hours) or health and medical news (in the morning and daytime) at :20/50 after; and entertainment and lifestyle reports at :25/:55 after.

If mistakes were made during the live broadcasts, a corrected segment would be produced (sometimes live) for the repeat broadcasts. ANC operated on a fixed schedule, where each news block ran the same length every day, and commercials (which consisted mainly of direct response advertisements, and from 1994 to 1999, promos for USSB's slate of general entertainment and premium channels; the satellite provider's ads were also seen at times on some stations that carried ANC programming) aired at the same time every day.

The on-air talent was mostly exclusive to All News Channel, though some anchors from Hubbard flagship station KSTP also served as ANC anchors, most notably Stan Turner, who worked for the network from 1992 until its closure; KSTP meteorologists and weather producers (Dave Dahl, who was the station's chief meteorologist throughout ANC's existence, among them) also presented taped weather segments for All News Channel until early 2002. Later, ANC show producers voiced their own weather segments, along with other stories.

=== 9/11 News Coverage ===
During the September 11 attacks, ANC struggled to keep up with the bombardment of information . ANC's traditional format only had a live newscast every four hours. Due to their small staff on 9/11, the network could only be live for 30 minutes per hour and then repeat the broadcast. The channel also did not have the live remote broadcast abilities of other sources, instead relying on second-hand reporting. Unlike most news broadcasts on 9/11, ANC continued to air scheduled commercials.

== Distribution ==
=== Broadcast syndication ===
Broadcast television stations in many markets carried All News Channel newscasts as filler programming, usually during the overnight and early morning hours in lieu of signing off, or scheduling movies, infomercials or other syndicated programming during those timeslots (similar to the overnight carriage of Headline News that was also common among stations during the same timeframe). In later years, as NBC, ABC and CBS launched their own overnight news programs (NBC Nightside, World News Now and Up to the Minute respectively), ANC programming continued to air on many of their affiliates—including Hubbard-owned stations—as a complement to these programs and also to provide an overnight news option on weekends, when no such option was offered (outside of Nightside during its 1991–98 run).

Some Hubbard stations ran ANC as a substitute for their affiliated network's overnight newscasts—including KSTP, which offered ANC programming overnights from March 1990 until ANC ceased operations in September 2002, when it began clearing ABC's World News Now (which had been preempted in the Minneapolis–St. Paul market since its August 1991 debut) as a replacement. (From January 1990 to October 1994, KSTP offered ANC programming and live locally produced newscasts in rotating half-hour blocks, as part of an overnight news block branded as Eyewitness News All Night.) In addition, since ANC's newscasts never contained any copyrighted music (by design), stations broadcasting the ANC feed could stay on the air longer without increasing their ASCAP, Broadcast Music Incorporated (BMI), and/or SESAC fees.

== See also ==
- Satellite News Channel – a similar cable news channel owned by Group W Satellite Communications and ABC Video Enterprises that operated from 1982 to 1983
- NewsNet – a similar digital subchannel network and newscast production company that operated from 2019 to 2024
