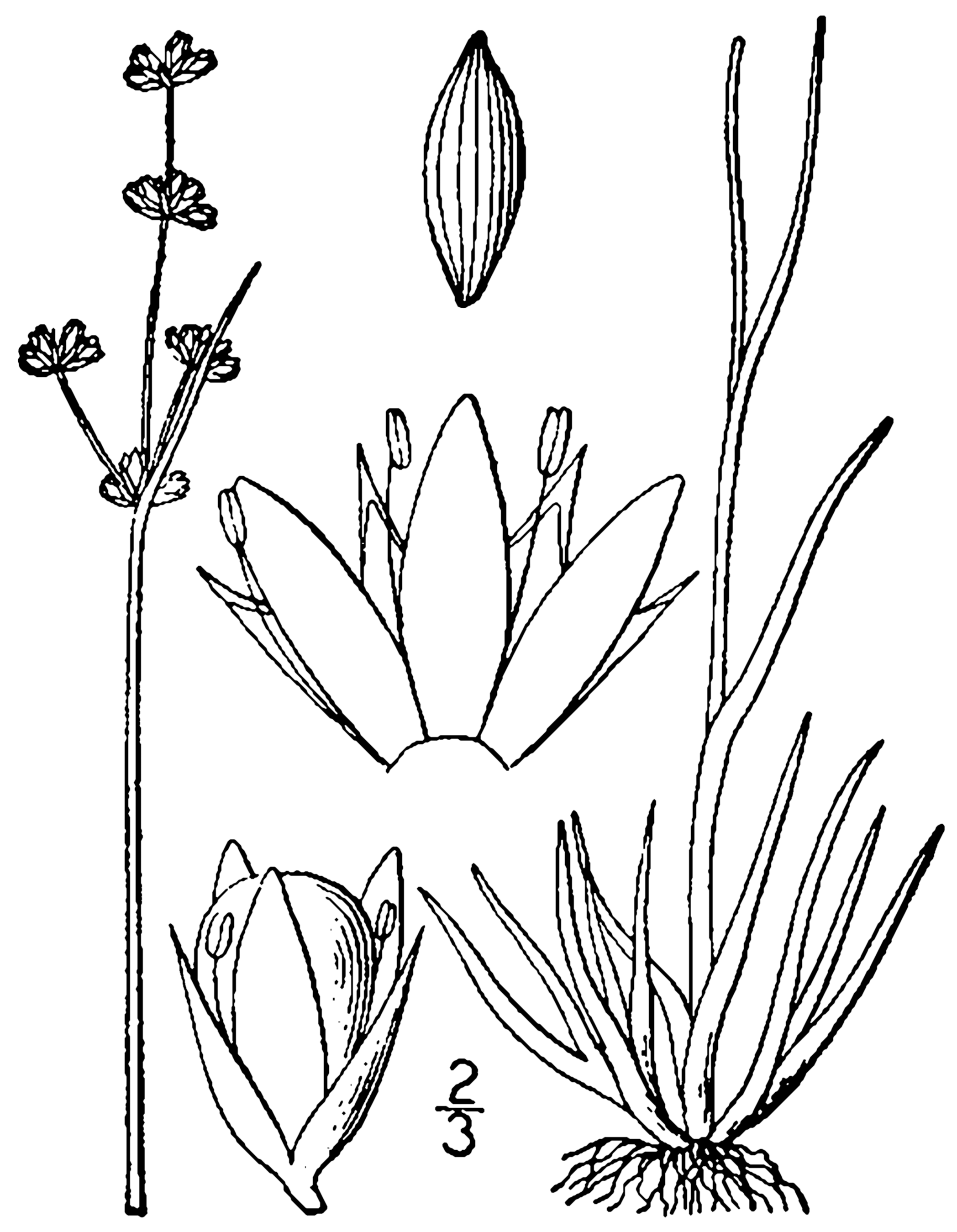

Scientific classification
- Kingdom: Plantae
- Clade: Tracheophytes
- Clade: Angiosperms
- Clade: Monocots
- Clade: Commelinids
- Order: Poales
- Family: Juncaceae
- Genus: Juncus
- Species: J. marginatus

Binomial name
- Juncus marginatus Rostk.

Synonyms
- List: Juncus aristulatus Michx.; Juncus aristulatus var. pinetorum Coville; Juncus buchenaui Sved.; Juncus canaliculatus Liebm.; Juncus cylindricus M.A.Curtis; Juncus heteranthos Nutt.; Juncus marginatus var. aristulatus (Michx.) Coville; Juncus marginatus var. biflorus (Elliott) Engelm.; Juncus marginatus var. marginatus; Juncus marginatus var. odoratus Torr.; Juncus marginatus var. paucicapitatus Engelm.; Juncus marginatus var. setosus Coville; Juncus odoratus (Torr.) Steud.; Juncus setosus (Coville) Small; Luzula angustifolia Poir.; Luzula juncoides Poir.; Tristemon laxum Raf.

= Juncus marginatus =

Species of grass

Juncus marginatus is a species of flowering plant. It is a type of rush with the common names of margined rush and grass-leaf rush.

== Description ==
Juncus marginatus is a grass-like, herbaceous, short-lived perennial growing from short rhizomes. Plants produce dense tufts or clumps growing 30-130 cm tall. The plants are sometimes rhizomatous. The leaf blades are flat. The flowers are grouped together into a terminal inflorescence called a glomerulus. Each flower has three stamens and three sharply acute sepals that are reddish-brown in color. The plump and ribbed seeds are produced in a rounded and beakless capsule. The small yellow to light brown seeds are spindle-shaped, and around 0.5mm in length and lack a tail but have sharp points on either end (apiculate). The diploid chromosome count is 38.

== Distribution and habitat ==
Juncus marginatus grows in North America in the Eastern and Southeastern US, ranging to Texas and South Dakota. It is also found in Ontario, Canada, California, Colorado, New Mexico, Oregon, New Mexico, the West Indies (Cuba), and Central America, where it is found growing in moist to wet bogs, on shorelines, in marshes and ditches - with sandy, peaty, or clayey soils. One historic population existed in Minnesota until 1999, when other small populations were found in Anoka County; because of its rarity, it was listed as an endangered species in the state. In Minnesota, the species is found growing in shallow wetlands/prairies of the Anoka Sand Plain where the normally dry sandy ground dips below the water table.
