= Stan Turner =

Stan Turner may refer to:

- Stan Turner (footballer)
- Stan Turner (RAF officer)
- Stan Turner (news anchor)
