= USSB =

USSB might stand for:

- United States Satellite Broadcasting
- United States Shipping Board
- Upper Single-sideband (modulation)
