= Centennial School District (Minnesota) =

School district in Minnesota, United States

Address
- 4707 North Road, Circle Pines, MN 55014 Anoka County, Minnesota USA
- Coordinates: 45°9′18″N 93°8′51″W

District information
- Type: Public
- Motto: Connecting. Achieving. Preparing.
- Grades: K-12, Community Ed
- Established: 1957
- Superintendent: Jeff Holmberg
- School board: 6 elected members

Students and staff
- Students: 6857
- Staff: 882
- Athletic conference: Northwest Suburban
- Colors: Scarlet Red, White, and Black

Other information
- Website: www.isd12.org

Centennial School District, also known as Independent School District 12 or ISD12, is a public school district located in Anoka County, Minnesota, United States. It serves portions of the cities of Blaine and Lino Lakes, and serves the entirety of Lexington, Centerville and Circle Pines.

== Schools ==
The schools in the Centennial School District include:

- Centennial Elementary (Blaine)
- Golden Lake Elementary (Circle Pines)
- Rice Lake Elementary (Lino Lakes)
- Blue Heron Elementary (Lino Lakes)
- Centerville Elementary (Centerville)
- Centennial Middle School (Lino Lakes)
- Centennial High School (Circle Pines)
- Centennial Area Learning Center (Circle Pines)
- Centennial Community Education (Circle Pines)
- Centennial Early Childhood Center (Lino Lakes)

== More on Centennial ==
- The Centennial School District was ranked as having better public schools than 90% of the country, and 95% of the rest of the state in 2011
- Centennial Middle School raised money for H_{2}O For Life (tagline: Help to Others) ultimately raising enough money to feed the students once a week.
- The enrollment of the Centennial School District, 12 to be exact, began with 16 students in 1953 and then grew to 6,421 in 2012.
