= Kye Allums =

American college basketball player and transgender advocate (born 1989)

- Allums in 2014

Personal information
- Born: October 23, 1989 (age 37)

Career information
- High school: Centennial High School
- College: George Washington

Kye Allums (born October 23, 1989) is an American former college basketball player for the George Washington University women's team who in 2010 came out as a trans man, becoming the first openly transgender NCAA Division I college athlete.; in 2026, Allums announced that she had detransitioned and no longer identified as trans. Allums is a transgender advocate, public speaker, artist, and mentor to LGBT youth.

== Personal life ==
Allums graduated from Centennial High School in Circle Pines, Minnesota, United States. She played three seasons as a guard on the women's basketball team at George Washington University, the George Washington Colonials. Allums's teammates called her "Kay-Kay". Allums began telling people to call her "Kye". She came out as a trans man in 2010. Allums told sports website Outsports, "my biological sex is female, which makes me a transgender male."

In May 2011, GWU announced that Allums had decided to leave the GWU basketball team. She graduated from George Washington University in 2011 with a bachelor's degree in Fine Arts.

In 2014, Allums told the Huffington Post that she had attempted suicide in 2011 after receiving transphobic harassment due to an article written about her by ESPN.

In September 2026, Allums stated on her personal Substack page that she was "no longer transgender" and had detransitioned.

== George Washington statistics ==
Legend
GP	Games played	GS	Games started	MPG	Minutes per game
FG%	Field goal percentage	3P%	3-point field goal percentage	FT%	Free throw percentage
RPG	Rebounds per game	APG	Assists per game	SPG	Steals per game
BPG	Blocks per game	PPG	Points per game	**Bold**	Career high

Year	Team	GP	Points	FG%	3P%	FT%	RPG	APG	SPG	BPG	PPG
2008–09	George Washington	11	35	28.6	18.8	38.1	2.2	**1.3**	0.2	0.1	3.2
2009–10	George Washington	**26**	**193**	37.8	**37.1**	**75.0**	**4.6**	1.1	**0.8**	0.2	**7.4**
2010–11	George Washington	8	54	**47.4**	30.0	63.2	3.4	0.6	0.6	**0.3**	6.8
Career	George Washington	45	282	37.7	32.7	62.5	3.8	1.0	0.6	0.2	6.3

== Advocacy ==
After coming out as a trans man, Allums began traveling around the country to talk about life as a transgender person. She visited high schools, colleges and universities to discuss the transgender community and how it is possible to be transgender and play on a team. She gave advice on confronting bullies when being trans.

She starred in Laverne Cox's documentary The T Word, a film that follows young transgender individuals and explains what they go through.

Allums produced a project called "I Am Enough", which encourages other LGBTQ individuals to come out and talk about their experiences. The project allows individuals to submit their stories, thereby showing people who share the same issues that they are not alone.

In 2015, she was inducted into the National Gay and Lesbian Sports Hall of Fame.

== Published work ==
Allums published a book called Who Am I?, which features poems and letters she wrote about her parents and herself.
