= Gabbie Hughes =

American ice hockey player (born 1999)

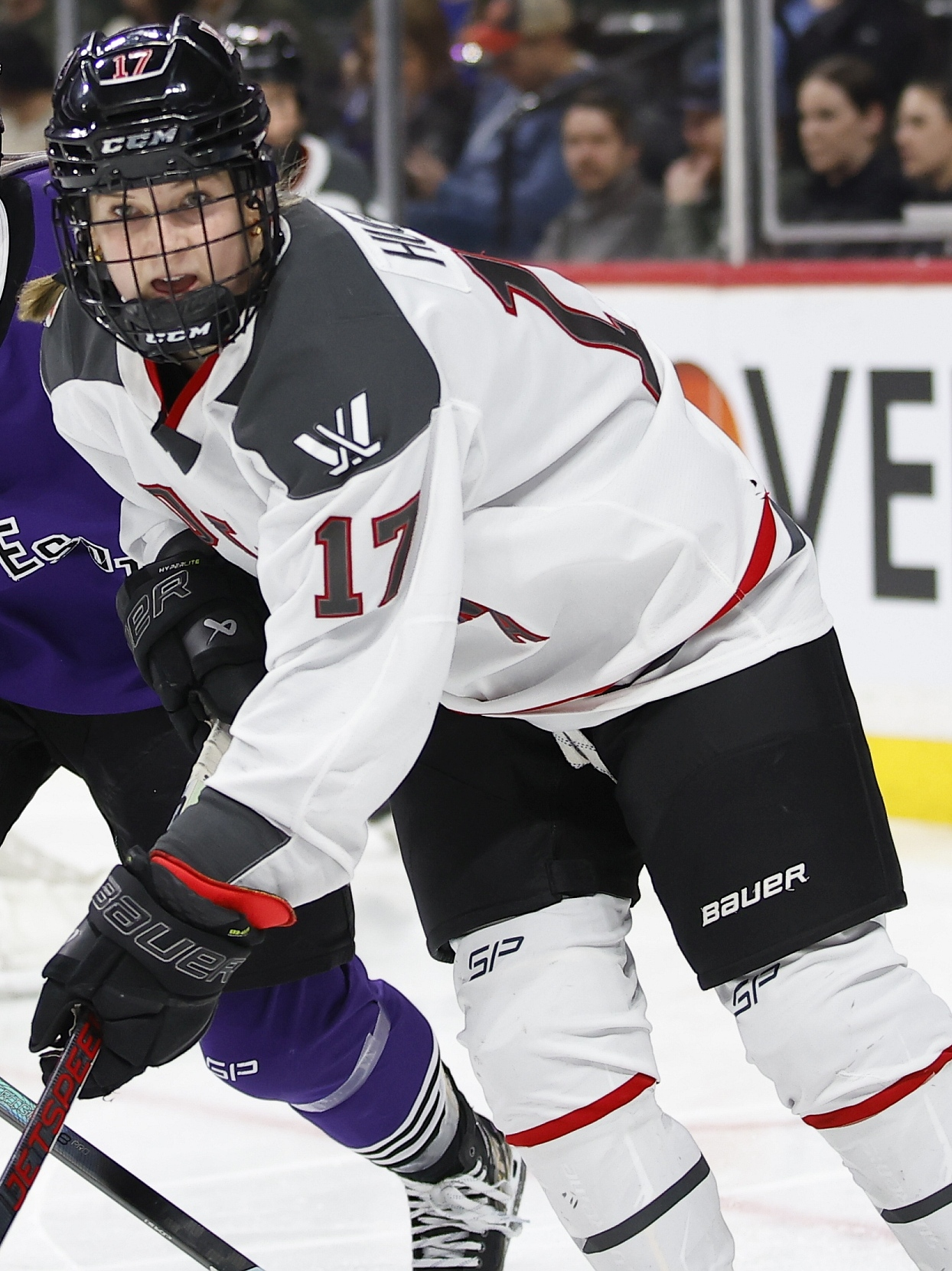
- Hughes with PWHL Ottawa in 2024
- Born: October 4, 1999 (age 27) Lino Lakes, Minnesota, U.S.
- Height: 5 ft 9 in (175 cm)
- Position: Forward
- Shoots: Left
- PWHL team: Ottawa Charge
- National team: United States
Medal record
World Championship
Gold medal – first place	2023 Canada

Gabrielle Marie Hughes (born October 4, 1999) is an American professional ice hockey player for the Ottawa Charge of the Professional Women's Hockey League (PWHL) and member of the United States women's national ice hockey team. She played college ice hockey at Minnesota Duluth, where she was a top-three finalist for the Patty Kazmaier Award in 2022.

== Early life ==
Hughes attended Centennial High School where she collected 315 points. She was an assistant captain her junior and senior year. In 2018, she was a top-five finalist for the Minnesota Ms. Hockey Award. She was the 2018 Star Tribune Metro Player of the Year, a two-time All-State selection, an East Metro Girl Hockey Player of the Year finalist as a junior, the 2018 East Metro Player of the Year, and a two time Star Tribune All-Metro Team honoree (Third Team in 2016–17 and Second Team in 2015–16).

== Playing career ==
=== College ===
Hughes played college ice hockey for the Minnesota Duluth Bulldogs and was an assistant captain her senior year. She was a top-three finalist for the Patty Kazmaier Award in 2022. She was the third freshmen in program history to lead the team in scoring as a rookie. She was named to the 2018–19 All-WCHA Third Team and the 2018–19 All-WCHA Rookie Team. She ranked seventh in the WCHA in scoring and second among all rookies, as well as fifth in the NCAA among all freshmen, and was selected to the USCHO All-Rookie Team. She was part of the All-WCHA Second Team and was ranked fifth in the WCHA in points and second in the conference with five game-winning goals. Her 51 points ranked tenth overall in the NCAA. She was part of the 2019–20 WCHA All-Academic Team. She scored her 100th career point on Jan. 30, 2021 against St. Cloud, making her the 22nd Bulldog to hit the milestone. She was named to the All-WCHA Second Team for a second consecutive year, and finished fifth in scoring in the WCHA.

=== Professional ===
On September 18, 2023, Hughes was drafted in the fourth round, 20th overall by PWHL Ottawa in the 2023 PWHL Draft. On October 30, 2023, she signed a three-year contract with Ottawa.

== International play ==
She represented the United States at the 2017 IIHF World Women's U18 Championship where she won a gold medal. She was also a member of the 2016 U.S. Women's Under-18 Select Team at the Under-18 Series vs. Canada, participated in USA Hockey's 2016 Women's National Festival, and attended the 2016 Girls Select U18 Player Development Camp.

== Awards and Honors ==
- 2023 Hockey Humanitarian Award

== Personal life ==
Hughes is the daughter of Miki and Terry Hughes. Her mother played volleyball at Minnesota State University. Her father is a former All-American Minnesota State hockey letterman. She has two brothers, Trey and Collin. She majors in Integrated Education Special Education at UMD.

== Career statistics ==
=== Regular season and playoffs ===
			Regular season					Playoffs
Season	Team	League	GP	G	A	Pts	PIM	GP	G	A	Pts	PIM
2013–14	Centennial High School	MNHS	25	16	13	29	12	2	0	2	2	0
2014–15	Centennial High School	MNHS	24	29	25	54	10	3	3	1	4	0
2015–16	Centennial High School	MNHS	25	43	25	68	18	3	3	2	5	4
2016–17	Centennial High School	MNHS	23	29	38	67	36	2	3	2	5	2
2017–18	Centennial High School	MNHS	24	36	32	68	22	5	9	4	13	0
2018–19	Minnesota Duluth	WCHA	33	19	18	37	26	—	—	—	—	—
2019–20	Minnesota Duluth	WCHA	35	20	31	51	26	—	—	—	—	—
2020–21	Minnesota Duluth	WCHA	19	10	11	21	14	—	—	—	—	—
2021–22	Minnesota Duluth	WCHA	40	33	37	59	24	—	—	—	—	—
2022–23	Minnesota Duluth	WCHA	38	10	36	46	18	—	—	—	—	—
2023–24	PWHL Ottawa	PWHL	24	9	3	12	20	—	—	—	—	—
2024–25	Ottawa Charge	PWHL	29	5	11	16	16	8	0	3	3	4
2025–26	Ottawa Charge	PWHL	28	5	11	16	16	8	1	1	2	4
PWHL totals			81	19	25	44	52	16	1	4	5	8

=== International ===
Year	Team	Event	Result	GP	G	A	Pts	PIM
2017	United States	U18	1st place, gold medalist(s)	5	0	0	0	2
2023	United States	WC	1st place, gold medalist(s)	7	1	1	2	2
Junior totals				5	0	0	0	2
Senior totals				7	1	1	2	2
