= Centerville, Minnesota =

City in Minnesota, United States

Centerville
- City
- Motto: "Fete Des Lacs" Festival Of Lakes
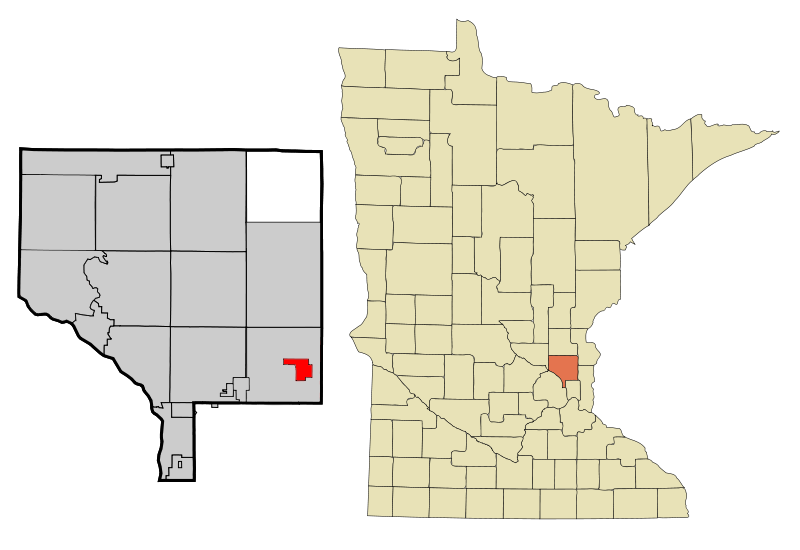
- Location of the city of Centerville within Anoka County, Minnesota
- Coordinates: 45°09′50″N 93°03′15″W
- Country: United States
- State: Minnesota
- County: Anoka
- Established: 1857
- Incorporated: September 27, 1910

Area
  - Total: 2.42 sq mi (6.28 km^{2})
  - Land: 2.12 sq mi (5.50 km^{2})
  - Water: 0.30 sq mi (0.78 km^{2})
- Elevation: 909 ft (277 m)

Population (2020)
  - Total: 3,896
  - Estimate (2022): 3,932
  - Density: 1,833.2/sq mi (707.79/km^{2})
- Time zone: UTC-6 (Central (CST))
  - Summer (DST): UTC-5 (CDT)
- ZIP code: 55038
- Area code: 651
- FIPS code: 27-10648
- GNIS feature ID: 2393784

Centerville is a city in Anoka County, Minnesota, United States. The population was 3,896 at the 2020 census.

== Geography ==
According to the United States Census Bureau, the city has a total area of 2.41 square miles (6.24 km^{2}), of which 2.13 square miles (5.52 km^{2}) is land and 0.28 square miles (0.73 km^{2}) is water.

Main Street / County Road 14 serves as a main route in the community. Interstate 35E is nearby.

Centerville is completely surrounded by the city of Lino Lakes.

== History ==
Centerville was established in 1857. It was named for its location in relation to Saint Paul, the Mississippi River at Anoka, and the Saint Croix River at Stillwater.

== Education ==
Centerville is served by Independent School District #12, the Centennial School District. Students attend Centerville Elementary School from kindergarten to 5th grade, Centennial Middle School in Lino Lakes from sixth to eighth grade, and Centennial High School in nearby Circle Pines from ninth to 12th grade.

== Demographics ==
Historical population
Census	Pop.	Note	%±
1880	130		—
1920	209		—
1930	196		−6.2%
1940	195		−0.5%
1950	209		7.2%
1960	338		61.7%
1970	534		58.0%
1980	734		37.5%
1990	1,633		122.5%
2000	3,202		96.1%
2010	3,792		18.4%
2020	3,896		2.7%
2022 (est.)	3,932		0.9%
U.S. Decennial Census; 2020 Census

=== 2020 census ===
As of the 2020 census, Centerville had a population of 3,896. The median age was 40.3 years. 24.8% of residents were under the age of 18 and 12.7% of residents were 65 years of age or older. For every 100 females there were 100.5 males, and for every 100 females age 18 and over there were 102.6 males age 18 and over.

100.0% of residents lived in urban areas, while 0.0% lived in rural areas.

There were 1,411 households in Centerville, of which 39.2% had children under the age of 18 living in them. Of all households, 65.8% were married-couple households, 13.4% were households with a male householder and no spouse or partner present, and 14.0% were households with a female householder and no spouse or partner present. About 17.9% of all households were made up of individuals and 8.1% had someone living alone who was 65 years of age or older.

There were 1,429 housing units, of which 1.3% were vacant. The homeowner vacancy rate was 0.4% and the rental vacancy rate was 2.8%.

Racial composition as of the 2020 census
Race	Number	Percent
White	3,454	88.7%
Black or African American	20	0.5%
American Indian and Alaska Native	24	0.6%
Asian	117	3.0%
Native Hawaiian and Other Pacific Islander	0	0.0%
Some other race	57	1.5%
Two or more races	224	5.7%
Hispanic or Latino (of any race)	124	3.2%

=== 2010 census ===
As of the census of 2010, there were 3,792 people, 1,315 households, and 1,025 families living in the city. The population density was 1,780.3 inhabitants per square mile (687.4/km^{2}). There were 1,363 housing units at an average density of 639.9 per square mile (247.1/km^{2}). The racial makeup of the city was 94.3% White, 0.3% African American, 0.4% Native American, 2.7% Asian, 0.4% from other races, and 1.8% from two or more races. Hispanic or Latino of any race were 1.6% of the population.

There were 1,315 households, of which 46.6% had children under the age of 18 living with them, 67.8% were married couples living together, 5.9% had a female householder with no husband present, 4.3% had a male householder with no wife present, and 22.1% were non-families. 17.6% of all households were made up of individuals, and 5.6% had someone living alone who was 65 years of age or older. The average household size was 2.88 and the average family size was 3.28.

The median age in the city was 35.8 years. 30.8% of residents were under the age of 18; 6% were between the ages of 18 and 24; 29.9% were from 25 to 44; 25.9% were from 45 to 64; and 7.4% were 65 years of age or older. The gender makeup of the city was 50.8% male and 49.2% female.

=== 2000 census ===
As of the census of 2000, there were 3,206 people, 1,078 households, and 879 families living in the city. The population density was 1,486.5 inhabitants per square mile (573.9/km^{2}). There were 1,094 housing units at an average density of 507.9 per square mile (196.1/km^{2}) The racial makeup of the city was 96.72% White, 0.25% African American, 0.44% Native American, 0.72% Asian, 0.37% from other races, and 1.50% from two or more races. Hispanic or Latino of any race were 1.44% of the population.

There were 1,078 households, out of which 50.3% had children under the age of 18 living with them, 72.8% were married couples living together, 5.9% had a female householder with no husband present, and 18.4% were non-families. 13.6% of all households were made up of individuals, and 1.8% had someone living alone who was 65 years of age or older. The average household size was 2.97 and the average family size was 3.28.

In the city, the population was spread out, with 33.6% under the age of 18, 5.1% from 18 to 24, 42.8% from 25 to 44, 15.2% from 45 to 64, and 3.3% who were 65 years of age or older. The median age was 31 years. For every 100 females, there were 105.9 males. For every 100 females age 18 and over, there were 104.3 males.

The median income for a household in the city was $63,696, and the median income for a family was $67,336. Males had a median income of $42,371 versus $31,474 for females. The per capita income for the city was $23,113. About 0.6% of families and 2.4% of the population were below the poverty line, including 0.7% of those under age 18 and none of those age 65 or over.

== Notable person ==
- Tracie Joy McBride, soldier and murder victim
