= Chris Anderson (baseball) =

American baseball player (born 1992)

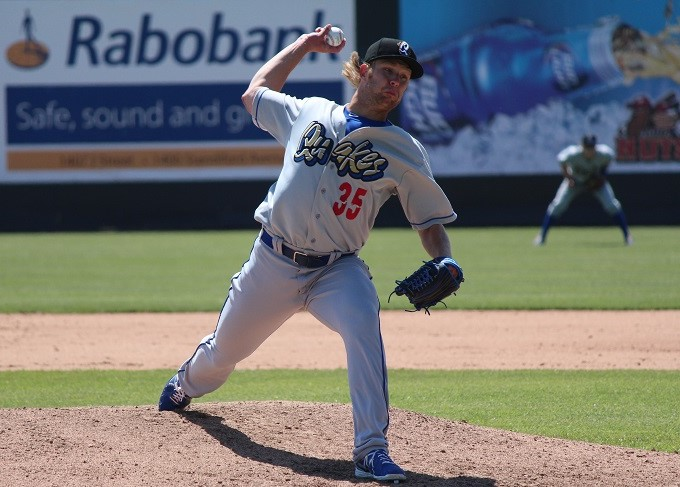
- Chris Anderson with the High-A Rancho Cucamonga Quakes
- Pitcher
- Born: July 29, 1992 (age 33); Lino Lakes, Minnesota, U.S.
- Bats: Right Throws: Right
- Stats at Baseball Reference

Christopher Ryan Anderson (born July 29, 1992) is an American former professional baseball pitcher. The Los Angeles Dodgers selected Anderson in the first round of the 2013 Major League Baseball draft.

== Amateur career ==
Anderson attended Centennial High School in Blaine, Minnesota, where he was a two-year starter as a pitcher and first baseman. As a senior, he went 6–1 with a 1.86 ERA while batting .437. He was named All-Conference, All-State, was Minnesota's contender for Gatorade Player of the Year, and was named Minnesota's Mr. Baseball award winner for the 2010 high school season. He was also a two-year starter at quarterback for the football team. The Chicago Cubs drafted him in the 35th round of the 2010 MLB draft, but he did not sign.

Anderson attended Jacksonville University. In 2012, he played collegiate summer baseball with the Yarmouth–Dennis Red Sox of the Cape Cod Baseball League. As a junior at Jacksonville, he went 7–5 with 101 strikeouts and a 2.49 ERA in 104 2/3 innings.

== Professional career ==
=== Los Angeles Dodgers ===
The Los Angeles Dodgers drafted Anderson in the first round, with the 18th overall selection, of the 2013 Major League Baseball draft, with the 18th overall selection. He was the first player from Jacksonville University to be selected in the first round of the MLB draft. Anderson signed with the team on June 12, 2013, for a signing bonus of $2,109,900.

Anderson made his professional debut with the Great Lakes Loons of the Midwest League on June 26, 2013. He made 12 starts with the Loons in his debut season, and was 3–0 with a 1.96 ERA. Anderson was promoted to the Rancho Cucamonga Quakes of the California League for 2014. In 27 games (25 starts) for the Quakes, he was 7–7 with a 4.62 ERA. His 146 strikeouts on the season was tops among all Dodger minor leaguers. The Dodgers invited him to attend major league spring training in 2015. He was assigned to the Double-A Tulsa Drillers of the Texas League to start the 2015 season and was named to the mid-season All-Star team. He made 23 starts for Tulsa and was 9–7 with a 4.05 ERA. He was promoted to the Triple-A Oklahoma City Dodgers in late August for a try out in the bullpen with the potential to be promoted to the majors in a bullpen role. He appeared in three games for them and allowed 15 runs in 6 1/3 innings and was not called up. He was given a non-roster invitation to Dodgers spring training in 2016. He returned to Tulsa to begin the 2016 season. He made 18 appearances with Tulsa (six starts) and was 3–6 with a 5.90 ERA before he was demoted back to the Quakes for the bulk of the season. With Rancho Cucamonga, he was 1–2 in 18 appearances and a 3.25 ERA. After the season, the Dodgers assigned him to the Glendale Desert Dogs of the Arizona Fall League. He was released by the Dodgers on April 4, 2017.

=== Minnesota Twins ===
On April 7, 2017, Anderson signed a minor league contract with the Minnesota Twins. In three starts for the High-A Fort Myers Miracle, he struggled to an 0-1 record and 18.90 ERA with eight strikeouts over 10 innings of work. Anderson was released by the Twins organization on May 15.
