= Stephanie Elam =

American journalist

- Born: January 23, 1974 (age 52); California, U.S.
- Education: Howard University
- Occupation: Journalist

Stephanie Elam (born January 23, 1974) is an American television journalist.

== Early life and education ==
Elam was raised in the San Francisco Bay Area along with her five other siblings. She grew up in Saratoga, California and attended Saratoga High School. Afterwards, Elam moved to Washington D.C. to attend Howard University where she earned a degree in broadcast journalism in 1995.

== Career ==
Elam began her career in New York as a copy editor for Dow Jones Newswires. Afterwards, she joined Bridge News, an international news service. After joining Bridge, Elam began her shift to broadcast news by covering corporate earnings for Nightly Business Report, PBS's business news program. Elam was also an anchor of First Business, a nationally syndicated, weekday morning financial news program and Market on the Close, a live show on WebFN which focused on the stock market in the last hour of trading. She also reported regularly on WebFN, a streaming financial news site. At WebFN, Elam became the site's only full-time reporter in New York. She often reported for "American Morning," on business and financial news for CNN's flagship morning show, and usually anchored the network's weekly program, "Your Bottom Line." During her tenure at CNN from August 2003 to April 2011, Elam covered diverse stories that defined an era, from the worst financial period in decades to the death of Michael Jackson. Elam was based in New York City as a CNN business news correspondent until she moved to California with her husband. Elam joined CNN's Money Team in 2003, and filed reports especially during the financial era of the subprime crisis in 2008 and the imminent failure of many big corporations. Elam also co-hosted "Black Enterprise Report," a nationally syndicated program from January 2005 to March 2007. Elam has also reported from the scene of significant events such as Pope Benedict XVI visit to New York City and she also covered Captain Richard Phillips' family in Vermont when he was taken hostage off the coast of Somalia. In 2005, Elam commenced work as the co-host of Black Enterprise Report, a nationally syndicated program focused on business, career and financial education until 2007. She also reported for Headline News and CNN International. Elam worked at NBC4 Los Angeles (KNBC) as a weekend anchor and general assignment reporter in August 2011 till November 2012.

She is currently an anchor reporter for NBC Los Angeles, as well as being a correspondent for CNN's Los Angeles bureau.

== Personal life ==
Elam has one daughter from her previous marriage. According to DNA analysis, she descends from the peoples of Guinea Bissau and also has European ancestry.
