= David P. Dahl =

American musician

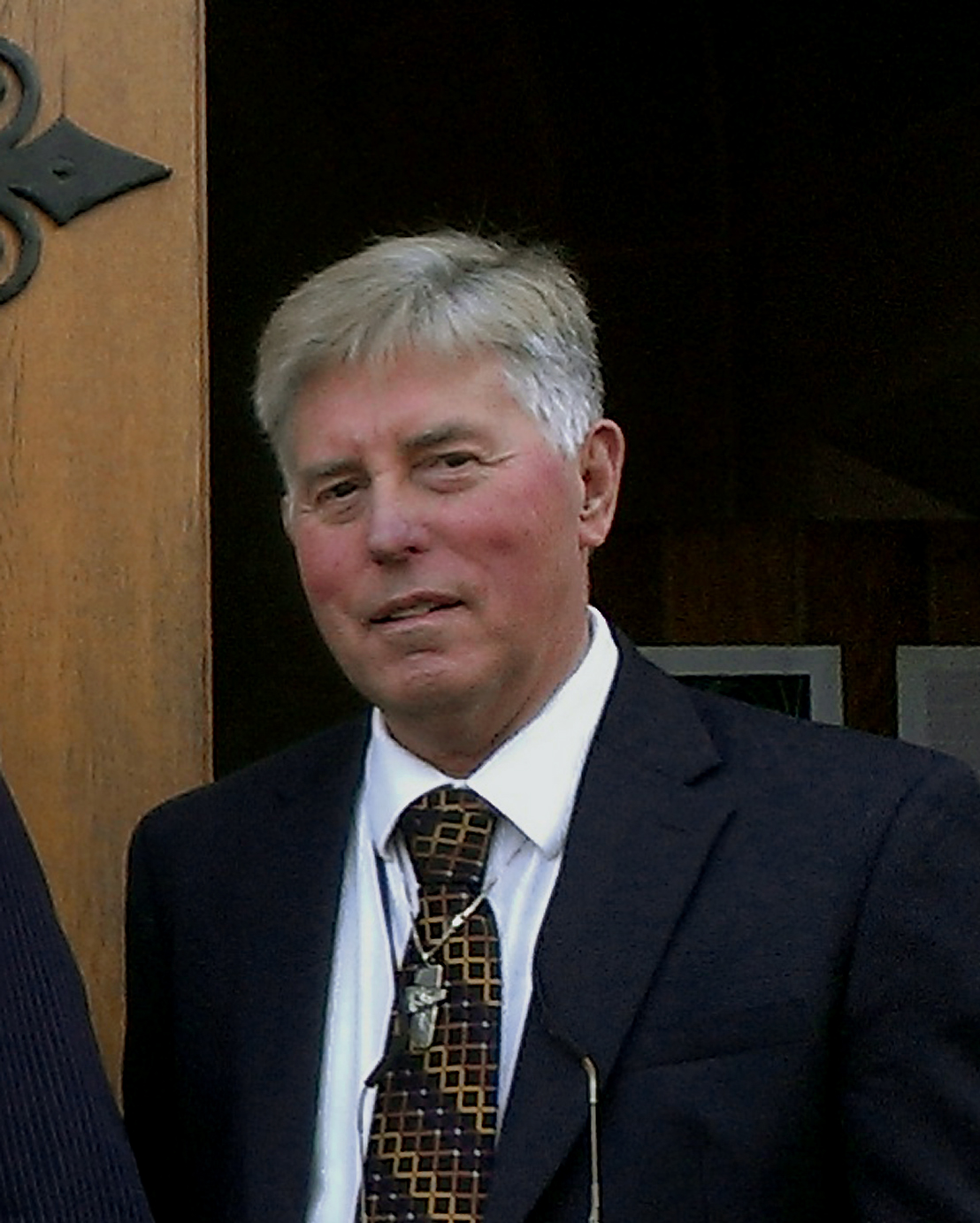
David P. Dahl, outside St. Mark Cathedral, Seattle. January 2015

David P. Dahl (born May 22, 1937 in San Francisco) is an American professor, composer, pedagogue, organist, church musician, organ clinician, and advisor. He is also one of the founders of Olympic Organ Builders.

== Biography ==
David P. Dahl was born in 1937 in San Francisco. His parents were of Norwegian ancestry, and Dahl became a student at Pacific Lutheran University, Tacoma, Washington, founded in 1890 by Scandinavian immigrants. After his education, Dahl remained in Tacoma and joined the music faculty of Pacific Lutheran University. At the time of his retirement in 2000 (after 35 years of teaching), he was named Professor of Music and University Organist Emeritus. Dahl served for 40 years at Christ Episcopal Church in Tacoma, as Director of Music Ministries, until his retirement in 2010.

Dahl has been awarded the Distinguished Alumnus Award from Pacific Lutheran University, and the Bishop’s Cross from the Episcopal Diocese of Olympia, and the Distinguished Service Award from the Organ Historical Society. He has presented many recitals and hymn festivals, both in United States and Europe. He has also performed at the national conventions of the American Guild of Organists and Organ Historical Society.

Dahl has been an advocate for new and historic mechanical action pipe organs. He has been organ consultant for several churches, institutions, and organ builders, especially in the Pacific Northwest region of the USA. He has designed specifications for a variety of church organs. Along with Glenn D. White, he established Olympic Organ Builders, in Seattle, in 1962. During its years of operation the firm represented several German pipe organ firms and maintained a workshop that built several pipe organs. He has been a consultant and advisor to organbuilder Paul Fritts.

== Composer ==
Through Augsburg Fortress, Zimbel Press, and others, Dahl is a published composer of organ music. His compositions include several original suites and numerous hymn preludes, intonations, and partitas. His compositional output for organ dates primarily from the years following his retirement.

=== Discography ===
- 1985 - J.S. Bach and the Chorale (with the Pacific Lutheran University Choir of the West and organist David P. Dahl). (LP) PLU Records and Tapes. PLU-8501-VR
- 2013 - The Organ Sings - Organ Music by David Dahl; Mark Brombaugh, Organist. (CD) Raven Recordings OAR-953

=== As a composer ===
- 1999 Hymn Interpretations for Organ, Augsburg Fortress.
- 2007 A Scandinavian Suite for Organ, Augsburg Fortress. (out of print)
- 2010 An American Suite for Organ: Variations on Four Early American Hymn Tunes, Augsburg Fortress.
- 2013 The Organ Sings, Augsburg Fortress.
- 2011 Variations for Organ on Dix, MorningStar Music Publishers.
- 2014 An Organ Anthology, Zimbel Press. [contains new editions of An English Suite for Organ, Concerto Voluntary, An Italian Suite for Organ, and the first publication of Voluntary and Fugue: G. F. H. & B-A-C-H]
- 2015 A Kingsfold Suite, MorningStar Music Publishers.

=== As a contributor ===
- 1999 Organ Music for the Seasons, Volume 2, Augsburg Fortress.
- 2002 Organ Music for the Seasons Volume 3, Augsburg Fortress.
- 2014 Augsburg Organ Library: Marriage, Augsburg Fortress.
