= Lexington, Minnesota =

City in Minnesota, United States

Lexington
- City
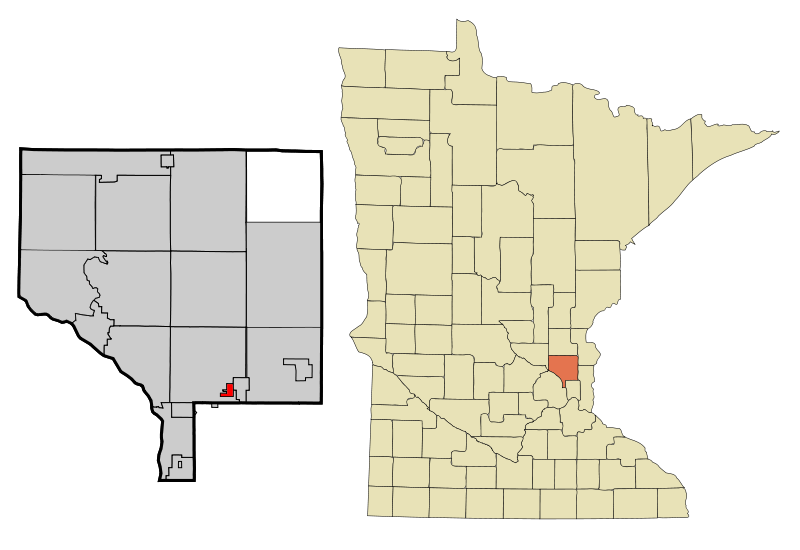
- Location of the city of Lexington within Anoka County, Minnesota
- Coordinates: 45°8′15″N 93°10′20″W
- Country: United States
- State: Minnesota
- County: Anoka
- Incorporated: May 21, 1950

Government
  - Mayor: Gary Grote

Area
  - Total: 0.69 sq mi (1.79 km^{2})
  - Land: 0.69 sq mi (1.79 km^{2})
  - Water: 0 sq mi (0.00 km^{2})
- Elevation: 912 ft (278 m)

Population (2020)
  - Total: 2,248
  - Estimate (2022): 3,072
  - Density: 3,261/sq mi (1,259.2/km^{2})
- Time zone: UTC−6 (Central (CST))
  - Summer (DST): UTC−5 (CDT)
- ZIP code: 55014
- Area code: 763
- FIPS code: 27-36836
- GNIS feature ID: 2395696
- Sales tax: 8.125%
- Website: www.lexingtonmn.gov

Lexington is a city in Anoka County, Minnesota, United States, and a northern suburb of the Twin Cities metropolitan area. The population was 2,248 at the 2020 census.

== Geography ==
According to the United States Census Bureau, the city has an area of 0.69 square miles (1.79 km^{2}), all land.

Lake Drive / County 23 serves as a main route in the community. Other routes include Lexington Avenue and Lovell Road. Interstate 35W passes near the city.

Lexington borders Blaine, Circle Pines, and Lino Lakes. Its landscape is uniformly flat because it sits entirely on the Anoka Sand Plain.

== Public service ==
Lexington is served by the Centennial Lakes Police Department, SBM fire department, and the Centennial School District.

== Demographics ==
Historical population
Census	Pop.	Note	%±
1960	1,457		—
1970	2,165		48.6%
1980	2,150		−0.7%
1990	2,279		6.0%
2000	2,214		−2.9%
2010	2,049		−7.5%
2020	2,248		9.7%
2022 (est.)	3,072		36.7%
U.S. Decennial Census; 2020 Census

=== 2020 census ===
As of the 2020 census, Lexington had a population of 2,248. The median age was 35.7 years. 23.8% of residents were under the age of 18 and 9.3% of residents were 65 years of age or older. For every 100 females there were 103.4 males, and for every 100 females age 18 and over there were 107.0 males age 18 and over.

100.0% of residents lived in urban areas.

There were 916 households in Lexington, of which 33.0% had children under the age of 18 living in them. Of all households, 38.1% were married-couple households, 26.1% were households with a male householder and no spouse or partner present, and 25.5% were households with a female householder and no spouse or partner present. About 29.3% of all households were made up of individuals and 7.6% had someone living alone who was 65 years of age or older.

There were 1,038 housing units, of which 11.8% were vacant. The homeowner vacancy rate was 0.2% and the rental vacancy rate was 21.5%.

Racial composition as of the 2020 census
Race	Number	Percent
White	1,726	76.8%
Black or African American	188	8.4%
American Indian and Alaska Native	19	0.8%
Asian	88	3.9%
Native Hawaiian and Other Pacific Islander	1	0.0%
Some other race	51	2.3%
Two or more races	175	7.8%
Hispanic or Latino (of any race)	138	6.1%

=== 2010 census ===
As of the census of 2010, there were 2,049 people, 787 households, and 519 families living in the city. The population density was 2,969.6 inhabitants per square mile (1,146.6/km^{2}). There were 861 housing units at an average density of 1,247.8 per square mile (481.8/km^{2}). The racial makeup of the city was 87.8% White, 2.7% African American, 1.1% Native American, 3.0% Asian, 0.1% Pacific Islander, 2.6% from other races, and 2.5% from two or more races. Hispanic or Latino of any race were 5.7% of the population.

There were 787 households, of which 34.4% had children under the age of 18 living with them, 43.6% were married couples living together, 15.1% had a female householder with no husband present, 7.2% had a male householder with no wife present, and 34.1% were non-families. 25.7% of all households were made up of individuals, and 4.3% had someone living alone who was 65 years of age or older. The average household size was 2.60 and the average family size was 3.13.

The median age in the city was 34.6 years. 25.5% of residents were under the age of 18; 9.8% were between the ages of 18 and 24; 28.9% were from 25 to 44; 29.1% were from 45 to 64; and 6.5% were 65 years of age or older. The gender makeup of the city was 52.0% male and 48.0% female.

=== 2000 census ===
As of the census of 2000, there were 2,214 people, 847 households, and 553 families living in the city. The population density was 3,196.1 inhabitants per square mile (1,234.0/km^{2}). There were 879 housing units at an average density of 1,268.9 per square mile (489.9/km^{2}). The racial makeup of the city was 93.36% White, 1.49% African American, 0.95% Native American, 1.36% Asian, 0.09% Pacific Islander, 0.99% from other races, and 1.76% from two or more races. Hispanic or Latino of any race were 2.53% of the population.

There were 847 households, out of which 37.3% had children under the age of 18 living with them, 44.2% were married couples living together, 14.9% had a female householder with no husband present, and 34.6% were non-families. 27.0% of all households were made up of individuals, and 5.7% had someone living alone who was 65 years of age or older. The average household size was 2.61 and the average family size was 3.15.

In the city, the population was spread out, with 29.2% under the age of 18, 9.9% from 18 to 24, 36.9% from 25 to 44, 18.6% from 45 to 64, and 5.5% who were 65 years of age or older. The median age was 32 years. For every 100 females, there were 110.5 males. For every 100 females age 18 and over, there were 112.9 males.

The median income for a household in the city was $41,618, and the median income for a family was $48,047. Males had a median income of $35,903 versus $27,147 for females. The per capita income for the city was $18,944. About 9.6% of families and 10.7% of the population were below the poverty line, including 15.0% of those under age 18 and 12.4% of those age 65 or over.
