= Circle Pines, Minnesota =

City in Minnesota, United States

Circle Pines
- City
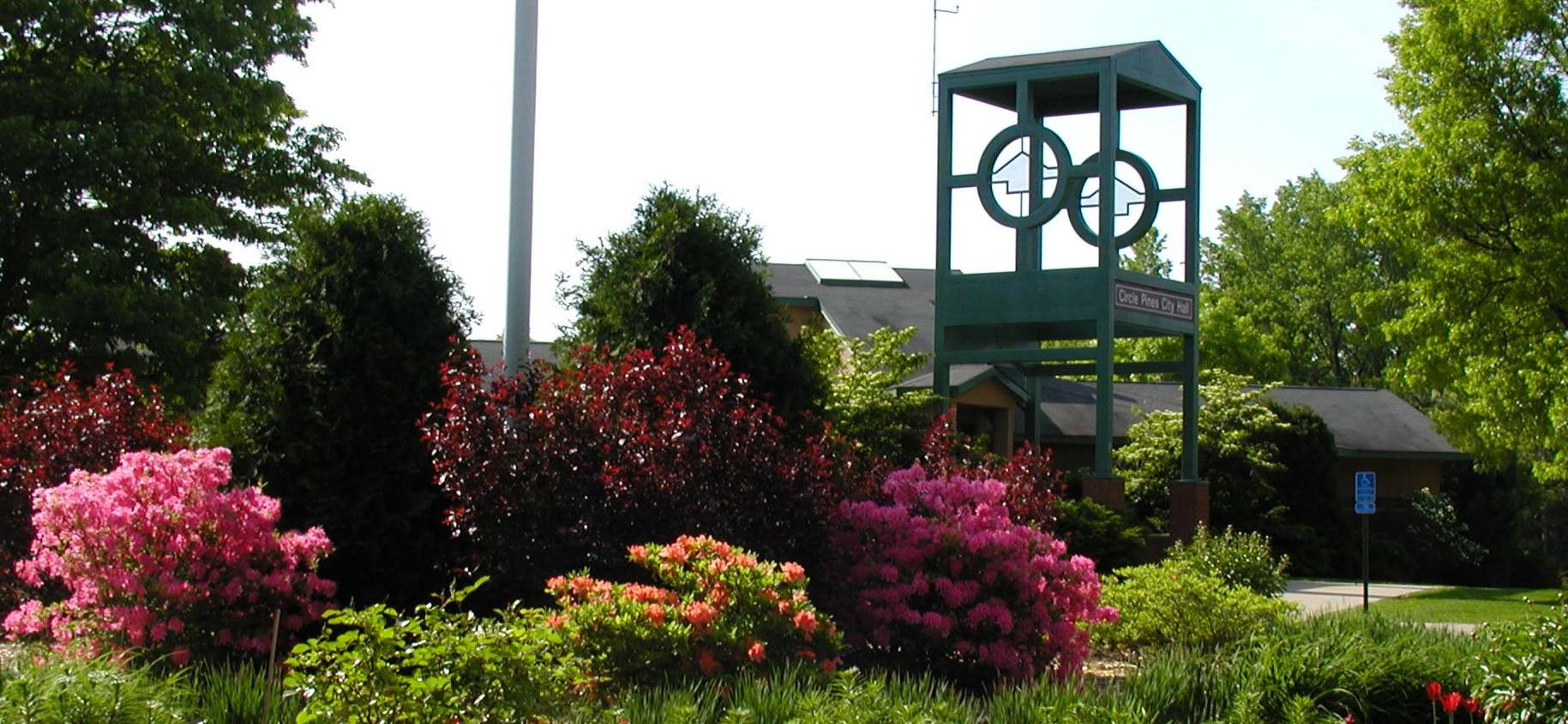
- Circle Pines City Hall

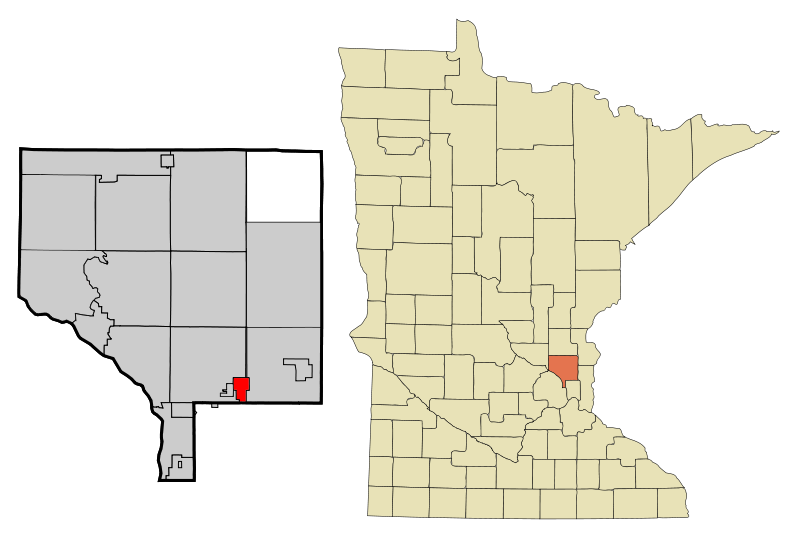
- Location of the city of Circle Pines within Anoka County, Minnesota
- Coordinates: 45°07′54″N 93°08′58″W
- Country: United States
- State: Minnesota
- County: Anoka
- Incorporated: April 13, 1950

Area
  - Total: 1.95 sq mi (5.04 km^{2})
  - Land: 1.75 sq mi (4.53 km^{2})
  - Water: 0.20 sq mi (0.51 km^{2})
- Elevation: 909 ft (277 m)

Population (2020)
  - Total: 5,025
  - Estimate (2022): 4,944
  - Density: 2,874.6/sq mi (1,109.89/km^{2})
- Time zone: UTC−6 (Central)
  - Summer (DST): UTC−5 (CDT)
- ZIP Code: 55014
- Area code: 763
- FIPS code: 27-11494
- GNIS feature ID: 2393526
- Website: circlepinesmn.gov

Circle Pines is a city in Anoka County, Minnesota, United States. The population was 5,025 at the 2020 census.

== Geography ==
According to the United States Census Bureau, the city has a total area of 1.97 square miles (5.10 km^{2}), of which 1.78 square miles (4.61 km^{2}) is land and 0.19 square miles (0.49 km^{2}) is water.

Lake Drive / County 23 serves as a main route in the community. Interstate 35W is in close proximity to the city. Circle Pines is approximately 17 miles from the heart of the Minneapolis-Saint Paul metro area.

Rice Creek flows through the city.

== Education ==
Centennial Schools (Independent School District #12) serves the community of Circle Pines and the surrounding cities of Blaine, Lino Lakes, Centerville, and Lexington. Children in Circle Pines attend Centennial Elementary, Rice Lake Elementary, Blue Heron Elementary, or Golden Lake Elementary before continuing their education at Centennial Middle School and Centennial High School.

== Governance ==
Circle Pines is a Plan A statutory city under Minnesota law. The Circle Pines mayor is elected for a two-year term and city council members for a four-year term.

The current mayor of Circle Pines is Matt Percy. Current council members include Steve McChesney, Nici Dorner and Meagan Bachmayer. The current City Administrator is Patrick Antonen, who is responsible for running the city on a day-to-day basis.

== Notes ==
Circle Pines is served by the Centennial School District, the Centennial Lakes Police Department, and the Centennial Fire Department.

Circle Pines was ranked as the third most perfect suburb to live in by CNBC in 2011 based on housing, education, crime, and employment.

== History ==
Circle Pines was founded as a planned cooperative community in which homeowners owned equal shares in the cooperative association which owned and developed the community. The name was selected because the cooperative movement in the United States in the 1940s used a circle encompassing two pine trees as its symbol. Although the community is no longer governed as a co–op, a municipally–owned gas utility remains as an operational memorial to Circle Pines' community heritage.

The Gibas family were one of the original families of the Circle Pines cooperative. Their papers offer further insight into the origins of Circle Pines, Minnesota. Articles and speeches, news clippings, correspondence, and photographs are available for research use.

== Demographics ==
Historical population
Census	Pop.	Note	%±
1960	2,789		—
1970	3,902		39.9%
1980	3,321		−14.9%
1990	4,704		41.6%
2000	4,663		−0.9%
2010	4,918		5.5%
2020	5,025		2.2%
2022 (est.)	4,944		−1.6%
U.S. Decennial Census; 2020 Census

=== 2020 census ===
As of the 2020 census, Circle Pines had a population of 5,025. The median age was 39.9 years. 22.0% of residents were under the age of 18 and 17.5% of residents were 65 years of age or older. For every 100 females there were 95.3 males, and for every 100 females age 18 and over there were 91.9 males age 18 and over.

100.0% of residents lived in urban areas, while 0.0% lived in rural areas.

There were 2,037 households in Circle Pines, of which 28.7% had children under the age of 18 living in them. Of all households, 49.3% were married-couple households, 17.1% were households with a male householder and no spouse or partner present, and 25.5% were households with a female householder and no spouse or partner present. About 26.6% of all households were made up of individuals and 12.4% had someone living alone who was 65 years of age or older. The average household size was 2.46 and the average family size was 3.09.

There were 2,077 housing units, of which 1.9% were vacant. The homeowner vacancy rate was 0.4% and the rental vacancy rate was 1.9%.

Racial composition as of the 2020 census
Race	Number	Percent
White	4,249	84.6%
Black or African American	216	4.3%
American Indian and Alaska Native	24	0.5%
Asian	205	4.1%
Native Hawaiian and Other Pacific Islander	0	0.0%
Some other race	50	1.0%
Two or more races	281	5.6%
Hispanic or Latino (of any race)	170	3.4%

=== 2010 Census ===
As of the census of 2010, there were 4,918 people, 2,006 households, and 1,349 families living in the city. The population density was 2,762.9 inhabitants per square mile (1,066.8/km^{2}). There were 2,085 housing units at an average density of 1,171.3 per square mile (452.2/km^{2}). The racial makeup of the city was 92.0% White, 1.8% African American, 0.4% Native American, 3.2% Asian, 0.4% from other races, and 2.1% from two or more races. Hispanic or Latino of any race were 2.0% of the population.

There were 2,006 households, of which 29.1% had children under the age of 18 living with them, 53.1% were married couples living together, 9.0% had a female householder with no husband present, 5.1% had a male householder with no wife present, and 32.8% were non-families. 26.4% of all households were made up of individuals, and 8.6% had someone living alone who was 65 years of age or older. The average household size was 2.45 and the average family size was 2.96.

The median age in the city was 40.5 years. 21.4% of residents were under the age of 18; 8.3% were between the ages of 18 and 24; 25.5% were from 25 to 44; 32.8% were from 45 to 64; and 12% were 65 years of age or older. The gender makeup of the city was 49.0% male and 51.0% female.

=== 2000 Census ===
As of the census of 2000, there were 4,663 people, 1,697 households, and 1,281 families living in the city. The population density was 2,660.7 inhabitants per square mile (1,027.3/km^{2}). There were 1,708 housing units at an average density of 974.6 per square mile (376.3/km^{2}). The racial makeup of the city was 96.01% White, 0.24% African American, 0.56% Native American, 1.74% Asian, 0.19% from other races, and 1.27% from two or more races. Hispanic or Latino of any race were 0.97% of the population.

There were 1,697 households, out of which 39.4% had children under the age of 18 living with them, 62.8% were married couples living together, 8.8% had a female householder with no husband present, and 24.5% were non-families. 19.8% of all households were made up of individuals, and 5.2% had someone living alone who was 65 years of age or older. The average household size was 2.75 and the average family size was 3.19.

In the city, the population was spread out, with 28.1% under the age of 18, 7.0% from 18 to 24, 31.6% from 25 to 44, 24.3% from 45 to 64, and 9.0% who were 65 years of age or older. The median age was 38 years. For every 100 females, there were 99.2 males. For every 100 females age 18 and over, there were 94.8 males.

The median income for a household in the city was $60,469, and the median income for a family was $70,670. Males had a median income of $43,008 versus $29,837 for females. The per capita income for the city was $25,438. About 1.2% of families and 2.3% of the population were below the poverty line, including 2.8% of those under age 18 and 4.9% of those age 65 or over.

== Notable people ==
- Mystery Science Theater 3000 writer/actress Mary Jo Pehl grew up in Circle Pines.
- Professional Fighters League mixed martial artist Kaitlin Young was born in Circle Pines.
