= Stan Turner (news anchor) =

American news anchor (1944–2025)

Stan Turner (August 18, 1944 – September 21, 2025) was an American news presenter who was the main anchor at KSTP-TV Minneapolis/St. Paul during the 1980s. Prior to joining KSTP-TV in 1968, Turner had worked at both KDWB-AM and KSTP-AM. In 1989 Turner became main anchor at KSTP-TV's parent company Hubbard Broadcasting's All News Channel a position he held until the channel went off the air in 2002.

From 2004 to 2011, Turner was news director, reporter, and newscaster with the MNN Radio Network. In 2009, he was inducted into the Pavek Museum of Broadcasting's Hall of Fame. Turner died from cancer on September 21, 2025, at the age of 81.
