= Level Studios =

LEVEL
- Company type: Digital Agency
- Industry: Advertising, Marketing
- Founded: 1995
- Fate: Acquired by Rosetta (2010); Acquired by Publicis Groupe (2011)
- Headquarters: San Jose, United States
- Number of locations: 3 offices
- Key people: Dan Connolly, former CEO
- Number of employees: 125 (2014)
- Parent: Publicis
- Website: www.level-studios.com

Level (stylized as LEVEL), is an integrated digital agency within the Publicis network. Headquartered in San Jose, California, the company has additional offices in San Francisco, San Luis Obispo, and New York. The company delivers integrated marketing and product development for global brands.

== History ==
Level was founded in 1995 as Web Associates (WA) by Dave Dahl and Mark Tuttle, with offices in Santa Barbara, California, which relocated to San Luis Obispo, California in 1998. It was the first external web agency for both Hewlett-Packard (1996) and Apple Inc. (1997), and has had multi-year relationship with both companies. In 1996, Lucent Technologies hired the firm to make their first corporate website and an online CMS (1997) for their domestic and international sales offices.

Tom Adamski was CEO from 2002 until 2012. The agency opened a second office in San Jose in 2007. In 2008, it rebranded as LEVEL Studios (LEVEL) and opened a third office in Los Angeles, CA. On November 20, 2014 Daniel Connolly was named the new CEO.

In September 2010, Rosetta (at the time the nation’s largest digital and direct interactive agency) acquired Level. In July 2011, Publicis Groupe (now Publicis) completed their acquisition of Rosetta and Level Studios.
