= First Business =

- Genre: Business news
- Created by: Densil Allen/BizNet
- Presented by: Angela Miles; Chuck Coppola; Bill Moller; Former: Carl Grant; Barton Eckert
- Country of origin: United States
- No. of episodes: 260/year

Production
- Executive producer: Harvey Moshman (2008-2014)
- Running time: 30 minutes, inc. advertising
- Production companies: BizNet (1989-1999); CONUS Communications (owner of All News Channel) (1998-2003); Weigel Broadcasting (2003-14)

Original release
- Network: first-run syndication
- Release: 1989 – December 22, 2014

First Business (full name First Business News) is an American syndicated financial news and analysis television program, produced by First Business Network LLC, a subsidiary of Weigel Broadcasting, in Chicago. Anchor Angela Miles, reporters Chuck Coppola and Bill Moller, and executive producer Harvey Moshman brought viewers commentary from the floors of the Chicago Mercantile Exchange and the Chicago Board Options Exchange, as well as from their studios in the West Loop.

The program, which typically aired before local and national morning news timeslots, had been marginalized as those shows began to start earlier (as early as 4:00 a.m.), with First Business often moved to lower-rated and lower-viewed graveyard slots. The program's cancellation ended 47 years of Weigel Broadcasting and their flagship station WCIU-TV (channel 26) carrying and originating business-focused programming from Chicago.

== Syndication ==
As of the fall 2011 season, the program was carried daily on more than 100 US broadcast stations and in outlets across 46 foreign countries, with affiliates across all the major networks, as well as independent stations. Air times varied, though the timeslots for the show in the majority of markets was 4:00am through 7:00am leading into early morning national newscasts or local morning newscasts. The only requirement the show enforced was that the program must air before the NYSE opening bell at 9:30am ET (except for Alaska or Hawaii, where time zones necessitated a post-opening bell airing). The show was syndicated by Weigel Broadcasting and sold by Edward. E. Finch & Company.

== History ==
The First Business program was originally launched in 1989 by BizNet, the broadcast division of the United States Chamber of Commerce in Washington, D.C. From its inception through its BizNet years with the Chamber, the First Business program production team was led by BizNet News Director Densil Allen.

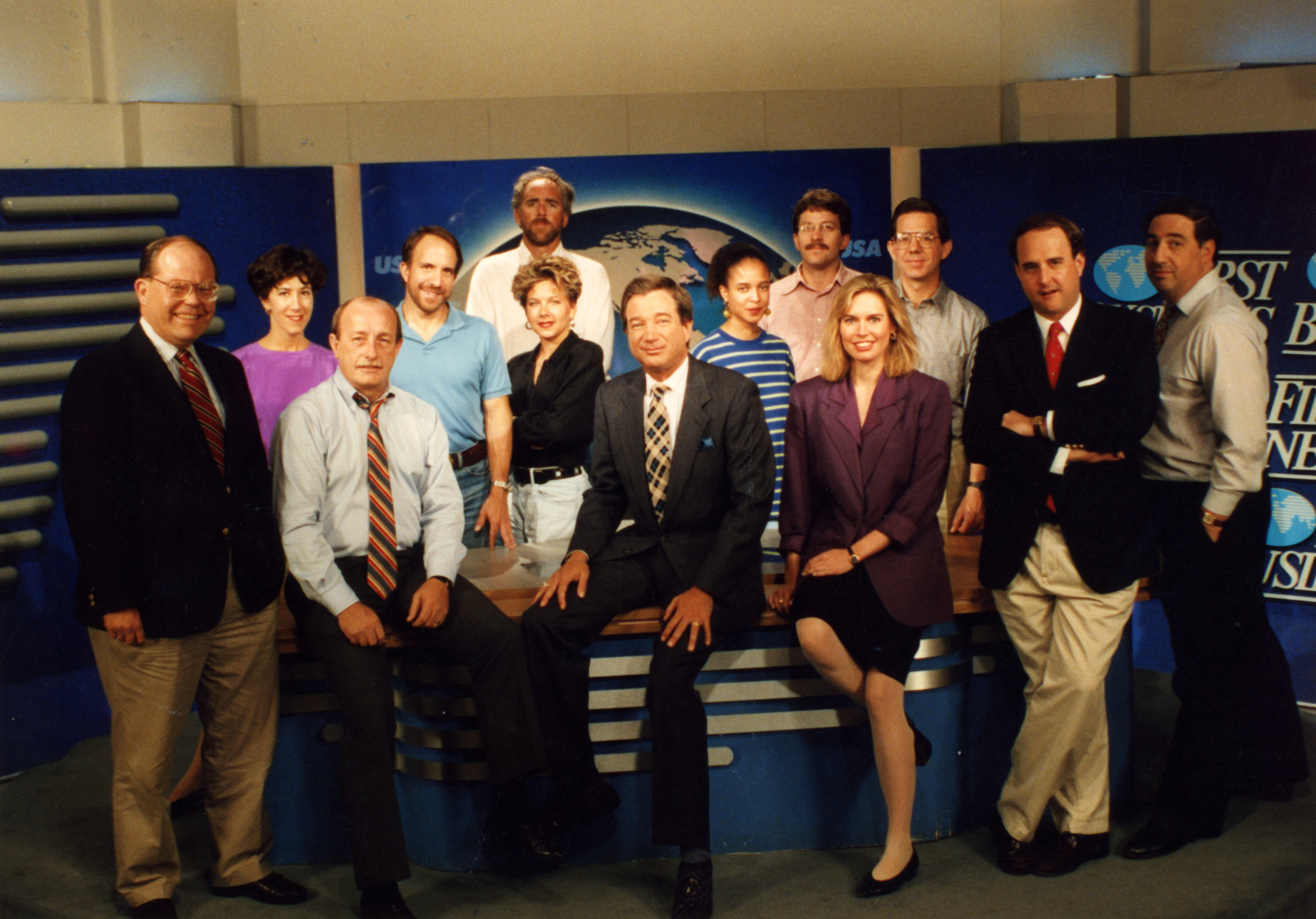
The First Business team circa 1992, when the show was produced by BizNet out of the U.S. Chamber of Commerce

The production of First Business was later taken over from BizNet by CONUS Communications, a joint venture of Viacom and Hubbard Broadcasting also responsible for All News Channel, who would produce the program until 2003. Barton Eckert hosted the program from CONUS' bureau in Washington, with his anchor segments being fed via satellite to Hubbard in St. Paul, Minnesota, where news packages acquired from CONUS' local member stations nationwide and other sources would be inserted into the program along with Eckert's anchor segments fed in from Washington, with the finished program being delivered via satellite to local stations from St. Paul very weekday. During this era, the program also aired weekday mornings at 6:30 AM on the USA Network; at the time CONUS produced short USA Update news briefs for the network.

In 2003, Weigel Broadcasting took over the program and moved the show to Chicago. With the loss of affiliates for the show as stations began to expand local morning news and force it into a graveyard slot, Weigel decided to shut down the program. Its last edition was produced before the Christmas break, on December 22, 2014.

Former host Angela Miles now hosts and produces the identically formatted Business First AM, which airs in a similar time slot and shares many of its same Chicago-based contributors.

== Notable former on-air staff ==
- CNN
  - Nicole Lapin
  - Stephanie Elam
  - Claire Leka
