= Olympic Organ Builders =

- Olympic Organ in balcony of University Unitarian Church, Seattle, WA

Olympic Organ Builders was an importer and custom fabricator of tracker action pipe organs in Seattle, Washington from 1962 through the 1970s. The company built approximately 25 organs for churches and schools located the Puget Sound and Eugene Oregon in the period from 1967 through 1970.

== History ==
The company was an informal partnership formed in 1962 of David P Dahl and Glenn D White Jr under the name ‘Olympic Organ Builders’ to import and install organs from Gebr. Späth Orgelbau, Detlef Kleuker, and Werner Bosch (all in Germany). They were joined by James R (Jim) Ludden in 1967 when the partnership was formalized. Ludden opened the construction shop located in the Fremont neighborhood of Seattle, in a building owned by White's father (Glenn Sr.), that had been a heating and sheet metal shop.

Dahl is an accomplished organist. He met Ludden while attending graduate school at University of Washington. Their first work together was revoicing the pipe organ at Trinity United Methodist Church, Seattle, in 1962, which was celebrated by a concert featuring E. Power Biggs.

White was the principal sales person and helped with visual design. White also voiced and tuned the organs. Dahl helped with sales and tonal design. Ludden did the engineering and supervised the three to five employees.

Ludden trained as an organ builder in Germany in the shop of Detlef Kleuker, Brackwede (near Bielefeld), Germany, for a period of one year. Glenn trained as an acoustic engineer and was sound director at Seattle Center after working as a vibration engineer for Boeing Commercial Airplanes. Dahl studied pipe organ at University of Washington and is now professor of organ at Pacific Lutheran University.

Prior to forming Olympic Organ Builders, White had been ordering custom pipe organs and installing these on his vacations. (White continued to import and install organs and modify old organs after the partnership dissolved in 1970.) He continued to work full time at Seattle Center.

The firm built mostly small organs. Their first work was a one-manual organ displayed at the Episcopal National Convention in St. Mark’s Cathedral, Seattle. Ludden's masterpiece (in its original meaning) is located in the suspended choir loft at University Unitarian Church. Many of the organs were two-manual (keyboard) plus pedal practice organs.

Employees included Beth Berry Barber, David O Ruberg, Barry Turley (now Fall River, MA), and Randall McCarty (deceased).

Construction effectively ended in 1970 when the partnership was formally dissolved after Boeing lost a large federal contract and the economy of Seattle fell into depression. Glenn continued to use the name when installing imported organs during the 1970s.

== Organs built in Seattle ==
A search of the internet will provide more current results than could be recorded here, but will include work attributed to the firm that was either done by White after the shop was closed or installations prior to the shop opening.

- Small one-manual organ built to be shown at the Episcopal National Convention in Seattle, September 1967. This organ has moved several times.
- University Unitarian Church (1969), Seattle.
- St. Stephen's Episcopal, Longview, WA, (1969)
- St. Madeleine-Sophie, Bellevue, WA
- John Knox Presbyterian, Normandy Park, WA (1969)
- David Dahl Residence, Parkland, WA, (1969)
- Practice Organs (2 manual, 3 stops)

- University of Oregon, Eugene, OR, practice organ
- Seattle Pacific University, Seattle, OR, practice organ
- Harlow, J. & Tikker, T. residence, Charleston, SC
- Pacific Lutheran University, Parkland, WA

Jude Frits carved pipe shades for several Olympic Organs

- Portable Pipe organ, one manual, 8’ + 2’

- Ingraham High School, Seattle, WA
- University of California, Santa Cruz, CA
- University of Oregon, Eugene, OR

== Organs installed ==
These were installed and voiced by Glenn White. David Dahl designed the stop list on most of these.

- St Paul's Episcopal, Seattle, WA, Gebrüder Spaeth
- St Mark's Cathedral, Portland, OR, Werner Bosch
- Richmond Beach Lutheran, Richmond Beach, WA, Detlef Kleuker. Built by Ludden while in training at Kleuker Orgalbau, Germany.
- Pilgrim Lutheran, Puyallup, WA, Werner Bosch (1966)
- St. Bartholomew's Episcopal, Beaverton, OR, Detlef Kleuker (1967)
- Messiah Lutheran, Spokane, WA, Werner Bosch (1969)
- Grace Lutheran, Wenatchee, WA, Werner Bosch (1967)

== Organs modified by Glenn White ==
- Magnolia Presbyterian, Seattle, WA (1976)
- Resurrection Lutheran, Des Moines, WA (1978)
- First Baptist Church, Tacoma, WA (new console)
- Holy Rosary Catholic Church, Edmonds, WA
- St. John's Episcopal, Kirkland, WA

== Organs built by Jim Ludden ==
After the Seattle shop closed, Ludden moved to New England where he built these portable organs.

- Boston Pro Musica
- Emmanuel Church, Boston (1973)
- State University of New York (since removed)

== Bibliography ==
- Pape, Uwe. The Tracker Organ Revival in America, 1977, ISBN 3921140161
- Glenn Dresie White, Jr
- Organ Historical Society Database
- Directory of Contemporary American Musical Instrument Makers
- OHS Seattle 2008 organ atlas
- The American organist, Volume 42, Issues 7-12
- The Tracker organ revival in America
- A guide to North American organbuilders
- Organ handbook
- The Organ yearbook, Volumes 1-5
- Saturday review, Volume 53, Issues 14-26
- L'Orgue, Issues 261-264
