= Dave Dahl (meteorologist) =

American meteorologist

Dave Dahl is a meteorologist who used to work for KSTP-TV in Minnesota.

== Personal life and history ==
Dahl was born and raised in Minnesota. He first became interested in studying the weather when he witnessed several tornados as a child in Circle Pines. He is a 1972 graduate of Centennial High School. He received his bachelor's degree in meteorology from Florida State University. Dahl has given presentations about meteorology to students in Minnesota and Wisconsin for the past 25 years.

== Career ==
Dahl began working for KSTP-TV on July 29, 1977, as a production assistant/meteorologist for the weather department as the station had eight others in what was dubbed by the station as "The Largest Television Weather Service in the World." He eventually got on the air during a 1979 broadcast of KSTP-TV's morning news program "Country Morning," which aired from 6-7am on the weekdays. He moved through the ranks, eventually becoming Chief Meteorologist in 1986, replacing longtime chief Dennis Feltgen (who moved on to WUSA-TV, eventually KARE-TV in 1987). He previously gave the weather forecast on weeknights for 5 Eyewitness News, Eyewitness News on 45TV (KSTC-TV), and also for the radio stations KS95 and 1500 ESPN Twin Cities. As of 2017, Dahl was sharing the weather deal with morning meteorologists Ken Barlow and Jonathan Yuhas, both of whom had previously had been at KARE-TV during the 1990s and 2000s (Barlow was Chief Meteorologist of KARE after its longtime chief Paul Douglas moved to WBBM in Chicago in 1994, and moved to WCCO in 1997). In 1998, the Minnesota Broadcaster's Association named him Broadcaster of the Year. Dahl also produced stories about tornado-chasing for The Weather Channel and The Discovery Channel. Along with the KSTP-TV news team, he received the 2003 Upper Midwest Emmy Award for Single Newscast. In 2008, he founded MyTiWi.com, a weather forecasting website. He cites the sun's impact as the primary influence in global warming and not greenhouse gasses. On December 30, 2020, Dave Dahl signed off one last time at the end of the 6:30 pm Newscast after 43 years of being at 5 Eyewitness News.
