= United States Satellite Broadcasting =

American satellite television service

United States Satellite Broadcasting Company, Inc.
- The company's final logo, used from 1996 to 1999, was designed by Paul Rand.
- Industry: Direct broadcast satellite broadcasting
- Founded: 1981; 45 years ago
- Defunct: July 1999; 27 years ago
- Fate: Absorbed into DirecTV
- Successor: DirecTV
- Headquarters: St. Paul, Minnesota

United States Satellite Broadcasting was a Saint Paul, Minnesota-based satellite television company that ran from 1981 to 1999. It was absorbed into DirecTV in July 1999.

== History ==
USSB was founded in 1981 by Hubbard Broadcasting President Stanley S. Hubbard, who is widely considered to be the father of modern satellite broadcasting. Hubbard spent most of the 1980s raising awareness and money to launch a digital satellite television service. In the 1990s, he had teamed up with Thomson Consumer Electronics and Hughes Electronics to come up with a practical digital satellite service capable of 175 channels. The original name of the service was HUBTV, named after Hubbard, but was soon changed to USSB. Other key early executives were his sons Stanley E. Hubbard, II and Robert Hubbard, as well as Paul Heinersheid, and Bernard Weiss.

When the service launched, USSB offered a comparatively small slate of channels, but included almost all of the major American premium channels and any channel in which Viacom had a stake at the time (which included the MTV Networks). Lacking any news channels, Hubbard instead used its in-house All News Channel, operated as a cooperative of Viacom and Hubbard-owned stations, as well as stations owned by other groups via the CONUS satellite network Hubbard operated. Hughes offered programming from most other cable television channels under the banner of DirecTV; viewers used the same satellite equipment, branded as the DSS (Digital Satellite System), to access both services (with USSB's channel lineup starting in the 900s range). Though it wasn't a requirement to subscribe to both services, many did, resulting in customers receiving two separate bills. On March 10, 1998, the Viacom channels (excluding the Showtime networks) moved to DirecTV while USSB added fXM and Showtime Extreme to its lineup.

Ultimately, the service was too small to succeed, with DirecTV outpacing it in channel capacity and marketing; an additional snag came when the DSS trademark was relinquished by DirecTV in a legal dispute. The Hubbards sold USSB to Hughes in December 1998, with only some employees transferring to DirecTV's El Segundo, CA headquarters and Castle Rock, CO uplink center from USSB's headquarters and uplink facility in St. Paul, MN; the channel lineup of USSB was integrated into DirecTV's lineup in July 1999.

== Channels ==
- HBO East
  - HBO West
  - HBO 2/Plus East
  - HBO 2/Plus West
  - HBO 3/Signature
  - HBO Family East
  - HBO Family West
- Showtime East
  - Showtime West
  - Showtime 2
  - Showtime 3
  - Showtime Extreme
- Cinemax East
  - Cinemax West
  - Cinemax 2/MoreMax
- The Movie Channel East
  - The Movie Channel West
- Comedy Central
- MTV
- MTV2
- Nickelodeon
- VH1
- TV Land
- Sundance Channel
- Lifetime
- All News Channel
- Flix
- FXM
