= Anoka Sand Plain =

Coordinates: 45.3943°N 93.5566°W

Extent of the Anoka Sand Plain in Minnesota

Anoka Sand Plain is a sandy valley along the Mississippi River in Central Minnesota. It is a subsection of the Eastern Broadleaf Forest Province of Minnesota and Northeast Iowa Glacial moraine complex. It is generally a flat, sandy lake plain, but includes sandy terraces along the Mississippi River formed by glacial outwashes. The terrain includes small dunes, kettle lakes, tunnel valleys, and sandy terraces produced by the Mississippi River and other major tributaries that feed into the Mississippi. The sand plain contains numerous habitats, such as the rare oak savanna, floodplain forest along the Mississippi River, deciduous forest, upland prairie, shallow wetlands, and heaths. Heath and floodplain forest are the most common.

The sand plain contains 131 rare species of plants and animals. One notable example is beach heather which is threatened in Minnesota.
