= Lino Lakes, Minnesota =

City in Minnesota, United States

- City
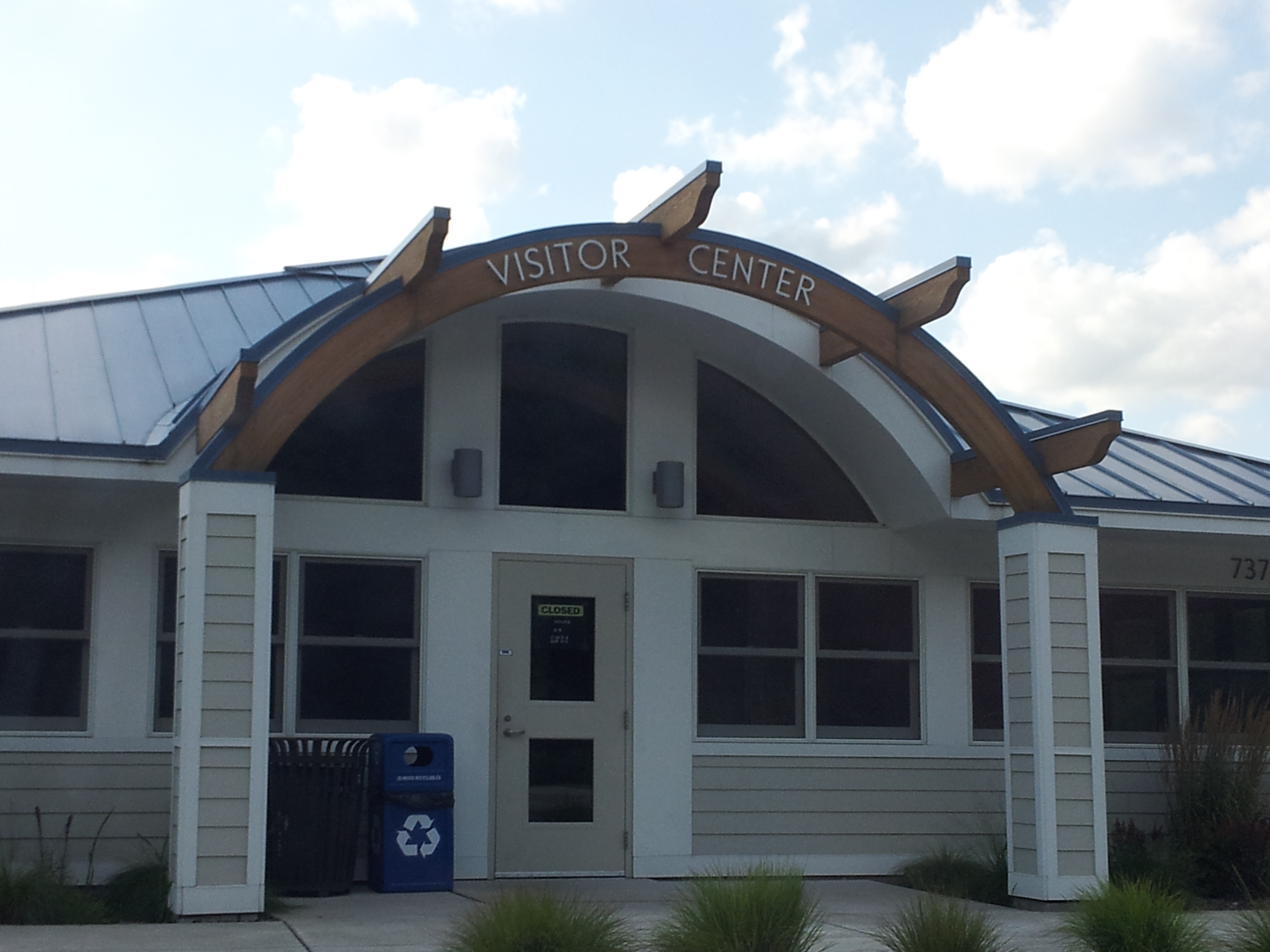
- Rice Creek Chain of Lakes Park Reserve Visitor Center
- Motto: "A Community With A Vision"
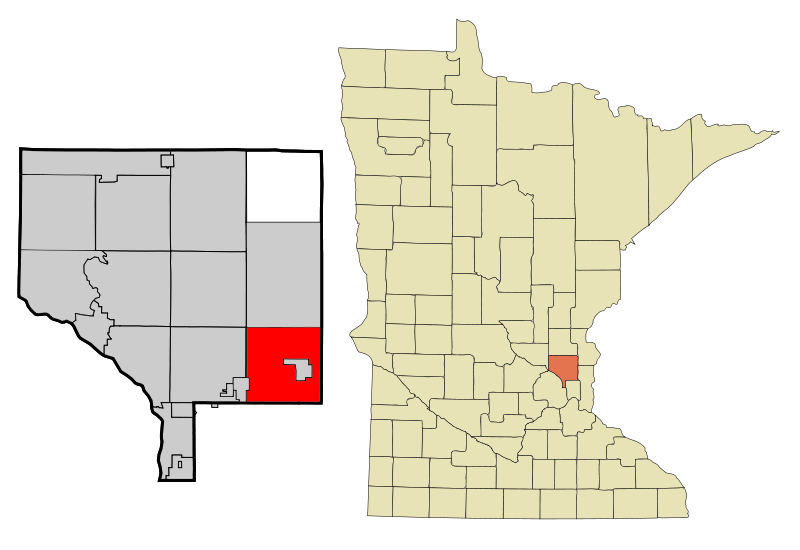
- Location of the city of Lino Lakes within Anoka County, Minnesota
- Coordinates: 45°10′03″N 93°05′51″W
- Country: United States
- State: Minnesota
- County: Anoka
- Organized: August 11, 1857
- Incorporated: May 11, 1955

Government
  - Mayor: Rob Rafferty

Area
  - Total: 33.21 sq mi (86.01 km^{2})
  - Land: 28.22 sq mi (73.08 km^{2})
  - Water: 4.99 sq mi (12.92 km^{2})
- Elevation: 892 ft (272 m)

Population (2020)
  - Total: 21,399
  - Estimate (2022): 21,973
  - Density: 758.4/sq mi (292.81/km^{2})
- Time zone: UTC-6 (Central (CST))
  - Summer (DST): UTC-5 (CDT)
- ZIP code: 55014/55038
- Area code: Area code 651
- FIPS code: 27-37322
- GNIS feature ID: 2395725
- Website: linolakes.us

Lino Lakes (/ˈlaɪnoʊ ˈleɪks/ LY-noh LAYKS) is a city in Anoka County, Minnesota, United States. The population was 21,399 at the 2020 census. Interstates 35W and 35E are two of Lino Lakes's main routes. It is an outer suburb north of the Twin Cities.

== History ==
When European settlers arrived, Native Americans already lived in and around the cluster of lakes that are now called Baldwin, Rice, Reshanau, Marshan, George Watch, Centerville, Peltier, and Rondeau. The Dakota people found this to be a land of plenty, with abundant wild rice and small game. Several Native American burial grounds are in the area. European settlers began coming to the area from both Canada and the eastern states around 1850. Those who settled on the lake's west side had names like Ramsden, Speiser, and Wenzel. The east side was settled by families including the Cardinals, LaMottes, Houles and Dupres. Many of their descendants still live in the area.

Several names were suggested for the new village, most containing the word "lakes". The origin of the word "Lino" is unknown. A Lino post office operated for about 10 years in the late 1800s. The town board decided to name the new village Lino Lakes. On May 11, 1955, the Village of Lino Lakes was incorporated. It covered the original Centerville Township except the Village of Centerville, and comprised 21,000 acres of land and 1,800 citizens. In 1972, the state legislature changed all Minnesota villages to cities.

The area's first unit of local government was the township of Centerville, organized on August 11, 1857, and encompassing 36 square miles. The population of just under 300 was organized into three loosely knit communities known as the "German settlement" west of the lakes, the "Swede settlement" south of the lakes, and the "French settlement" east of the lakes. In the 1950s neighboring villages started annexing land from Centerville Township. To protect the boundaries and allow for the financing of public improvements, the township residents voted to incorporate into a village.

On July 26, 2010, the Lino Lakes City Council voted 4–1 to establish English as Lino Lakes's official language. The resolution stated that all official documents would be prepared in English and that the city would not pay for translation of its documents into any other language. Proponents argued that expenses related to translation of governmental expenses were unnecessary. MetroNorth Chamber of Commerce president Lori Higgins said, "it makes the area appear unwelcoming."

== Geography ==
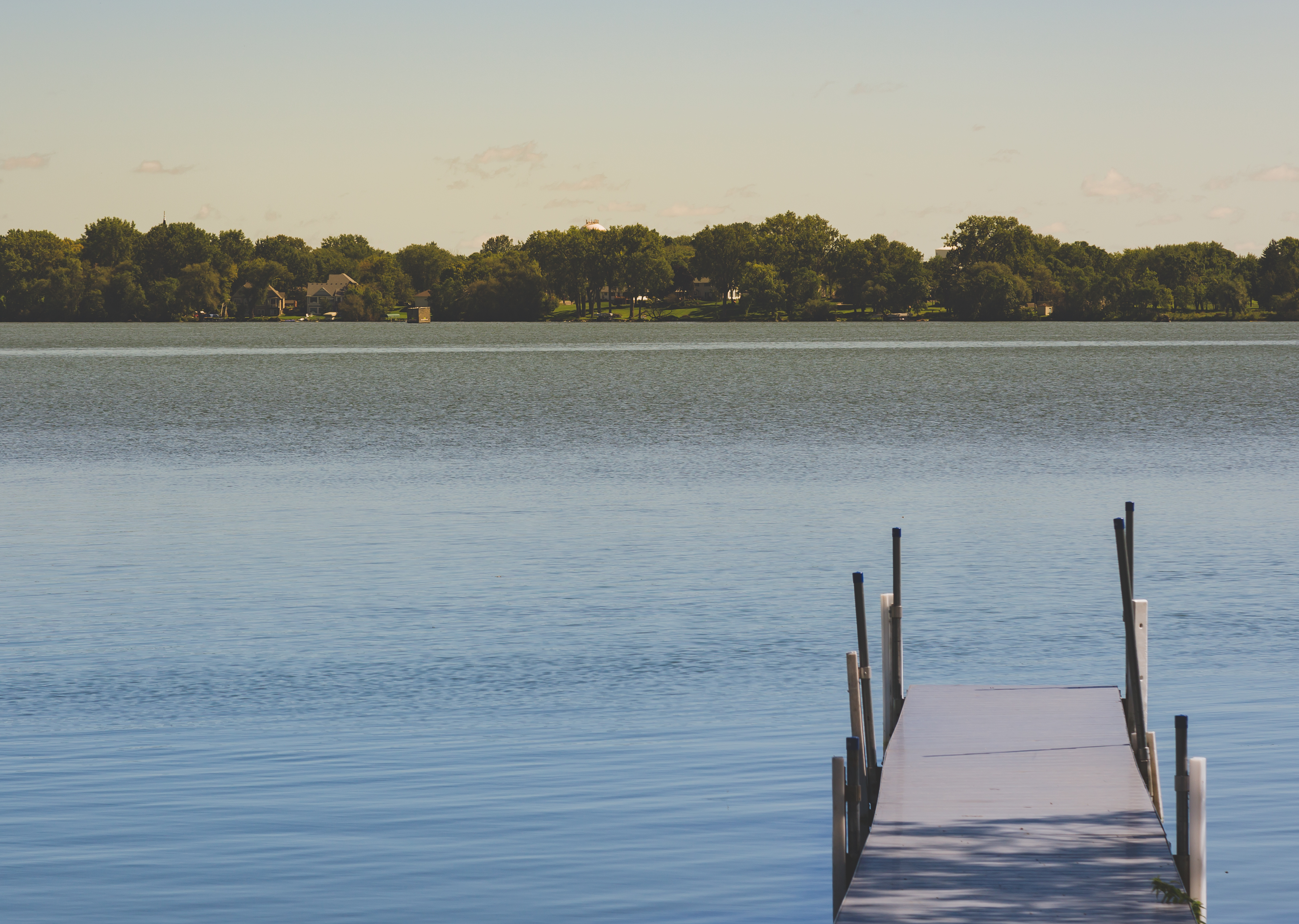
Centerville Lake Dock, Lino Lakes

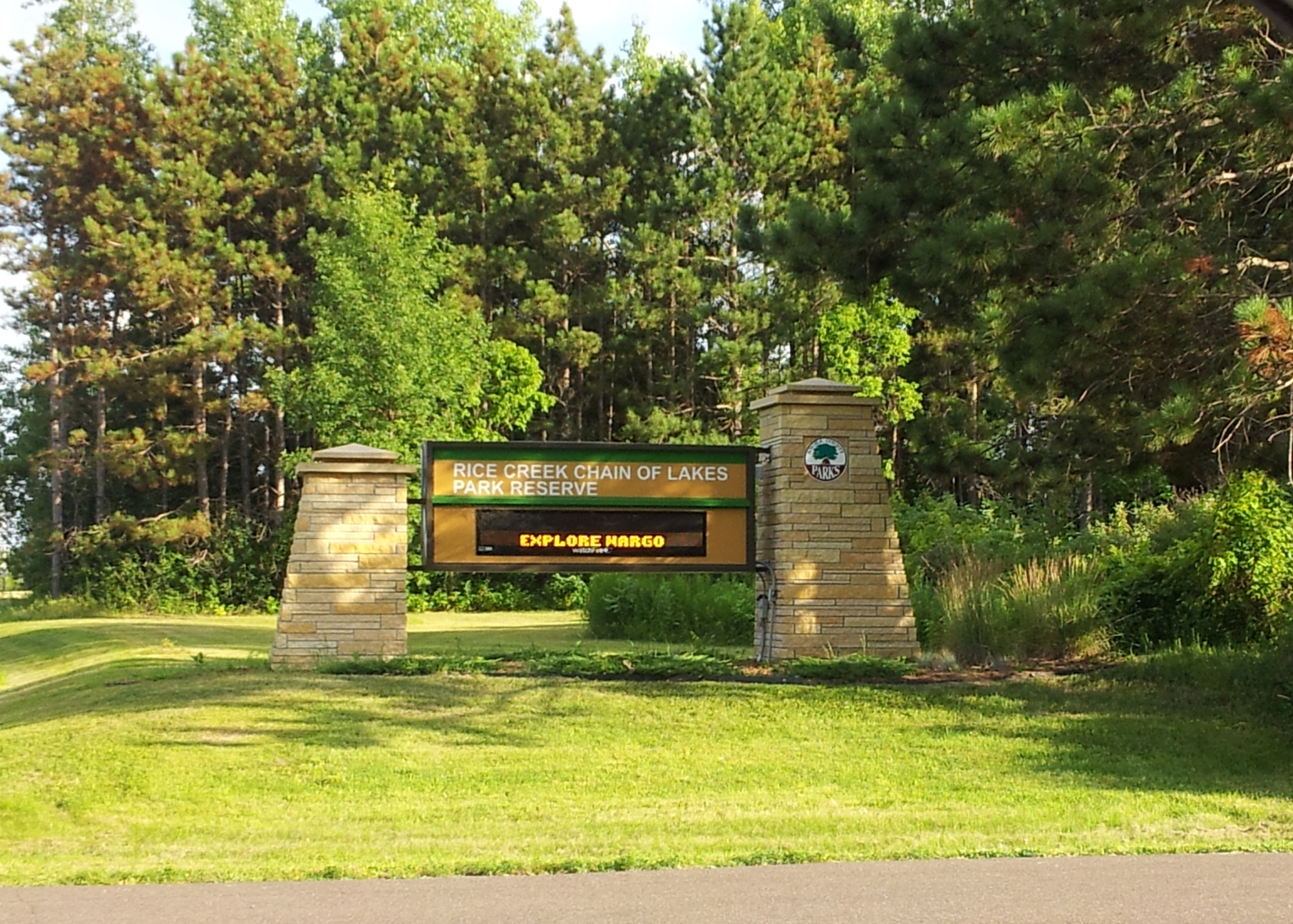
Rice Creek Park, Lino Lakes

According to the United States Census Bureau, the city has an area of 33.21 square miles (86.01 km^{2}), of which 28.22 square miles (73.09 km^{2}) is land and 4.99 square miles (12.92 km^{2}) is water. A total of 44% of the city's land was developed in 2010, compared to 37% in 2000.

Rice Creek flows through the city. Rice Creek Chain of Lakes Regional Park Reserve is in Lino Lakes.

== Demographics ==
Historical population
Census	Pop.	Note	%±
1860	351		—
1870	687		95.7%
1880	876		27.5%
1890	1,134		29.5%
1900	1,175		3.6%
1910	1,028		−12.5%
1920	740		−28.0%
1930	704		−4.9%
1940	745		5.8%
1950	1,219		63.6%
1960	2,329		91.1%
1970	3,692		58.5%
1980	4,966		34.5%
1990	7,807		57.2%
2000	11,791		51.0%
2010	20,216		71.5%
2020	21,399		5.9%
2022 (est.)	21,973		2.7%
U.S. Decennial Census; 2020 Census

=== 2020 census ===
As of the 2020 census, Lino Lakes had a population of 21,399. The median age was 39.8 years. 23.5% of residents were under the age of 18 and 11.1% of residents were 65 years of age or older. For every 100 females there were 113.5 males, and for every 100 females age 18 and over there were 116.6 males age 18 and over.

92.9% of residents lived in urban areas, while 7.1% lived in rural areas.

There were 6,957 households in Lino Lakes, of which 37.7% had children under the age of 18 living in them. Of all households, 70.7% were married-couple households, 10.6% were households with a male householder and no spouse or partner present, and 13.5% were households with a female householder and no spouse or partner present. About 14.4% of all households were made up of individuals and 5.4% had someone living alone who was 65 years of age or older.

There were 7,135 housing units, of which 2.5% were vacant. The homeowner vacancy rate was 0.6% and the rental vacancy rate was 10.1%.

Racial composition as of the 2020 census
Race	Number	Percent
White	18,465	86.3%
Black or African American	827	3.9%
American Indian and Alaska Native	176	0.8%
Asian	730	3.4%
Native Hawaiian and Other Pacific Islander	1	0.0%
Some other race	171	0.8%
Two or more races	1,029	4.8%
Hispanic or Latino (of any race)	546	2.6%

=== 2010 census ===
As of the census of 2010, there were 20,216 people, 4,174 households, and 3,683 families living in the city. The population density was 516.4 inhabitants per square mile (199.4/km^{2}). There were 5,323 housing units at an average density of 214.1 per square mile (82.7/km^{2}). The racial makeup of the city was 94.14% White, 1.1% African American, 2.03% Native American, 2.6% Asian, 0.1% Pacific Islander, 0.3% from other races, and 0.6% from two or more races. Hispanic or Latino of any race were 2.7% of the population.

There were 6,174 households, of which 48.1% had children under age 18 living with them, 73.2% were married couples living together, 7.2% had a female householder with no husband present, 3.5% had a male householder with no wife present, and 16.1% were non-families. 12.0% of all households were made up of individuals, and 2.4% had someone living alone who was 65 or older. The average household size was 3.05 and the average family size was 3.37.

The median age in the city was 37.44. 28.8% of residents were under 18; 7.8% were between 18 and 24; 27.1% were from 25 to 44; 31.6% were from 45 to 64; and 4.8% were 65 or older. The gender makeup of the city was 53.8% male and 46.2% female.

=== 2000 census ===
As of the census of 2000, there were 11,791 people, 3,857 households, and 3,162 families living in the city. The population density was 475.1 inhabitants per square mile (183.4/km^{2}). There were 4,021 housing units at an average density of 174.4 per square mile (67.3/km^{2}). The racial makeup of the city was 95.56% White, 0.9% African American, 1.0% Native American, 1.4% Asian, 0.01% Pacific Islander, 0.68% from other races, and 1.22% from two or more races. Hispanic or Latino of any race were 1.54% of the population.

There were 3,857 households, of which 55.9% had children under 18 living with them, 77.6% were married couples living together, 5.0% had a female householder with no husband present, and 14.3% were non-families. 10.0% of all households were made up of individuals, and 2.1% had someone living alone who was 65 or older. The average household size was 3.20 and the average family size was 3.44.

In the city, the population was spread out, with 33.7% under 18, 6.6% from 18 to 24, 39.8% from 25 to 44, 16.7% from 45 to 64, and 3.3% who were 65 or older. The median age was 33. For every 100 females, there were 118.3 males. For every 100 females 18 and over, there were 124.8 males.

The median income for a household was $75,708, and the median income for a family was $79,183. Males had a median income of $56,088 versus $37,220 for females. The per capita income was $25,419. About 1.1% of families and 2.0% of the population were below the poverty line, including 2.6% of those under 18 and 1.4% of those 65 or older.

== Education ==
Public education in Lino Lakes is provided by the Centennial School District and the Forest Lakes School Area. Schools in Lino Lakes include Blue Heron Elementary, Lino Lakes Elementary, Pine School and Rice Lake Elementary.

== Notable people ==
- Chris Anderson (born 1992), Minor League Baseball player
- Khyah Harper (born 2002), soccer player
- Gabbie Hughes (born 1999), Professional Women's Hockey League and United States women's national ice hockey team player
- Tyler Pitlick (born 1991), National Hockey League player with the Dallas Stars, selected by the Edmonton Oilers in the 2nd round (31st overall) of the 2010 NHL entry draft
- Anneke Rankila (born 1999), professional ice hockey player for the Toronto Sceptres, former forward for Djurgårdens IF Hockey and the Minnesota Duluth Bulldogs women's ice hockey
- Pat Shortridge, former chair of the Republican Party of Minnesota
