= Paul Bunyan (disambiguation) =

Paul Bunyan is a mythical lumberjack.

Paul Bunyan may also refer to:

- Paul Bunyan (novel), a 1924 novel written by Esther Shephard and illustrated by Rockwell Kent
- Paul Bunyan (book), a 1925 book by James Stevens
- Paul Bunyan (film), a 1958 Walt Disney film, directed by Les Clark
- Paul Bunyan (operetta), a 1941 choral operetta composed by Benjamin Britten
- Paul Bunyan and Babe the Blue Ox, a 1937 set of statues in Minnesota
- Paul Bunyan's Axe, a traveling trophy passed between the University of Minnesota and the University of Wisconsin
- Paul Bunyan Broadcasting, a broadcasting company based in Bemidji, Minnesota
- Paul Bunyan Land, an amusement park in Brainerd, Minnesota
- Paul Bunyan Network, a group of radio stations in Michigan
- Paul Bunyan State Forest, a state forest in Minnesota
- Paul Bunyan State Trail, a rail trail in Minnesota
- Paul Bunyan Trophy, a college rivalry trophy awarded to the winner of the annual American football game between the University of Michigan and Michigan State University
- Operation Paul Bunyan, a show of force by the United States military in response to an attack by North Korean soldiers
- SS Paul Bunyan, a cargo ship built in the United States during World War II
- Paul Bunyan, the former stage name of professional wrestler Max Palmer.

== See also ==
- Paul Bunyan's Slingshot, 2024 album by Liquid Mike
