= Paul Bunyan =

Giant lumberjack in American folklore

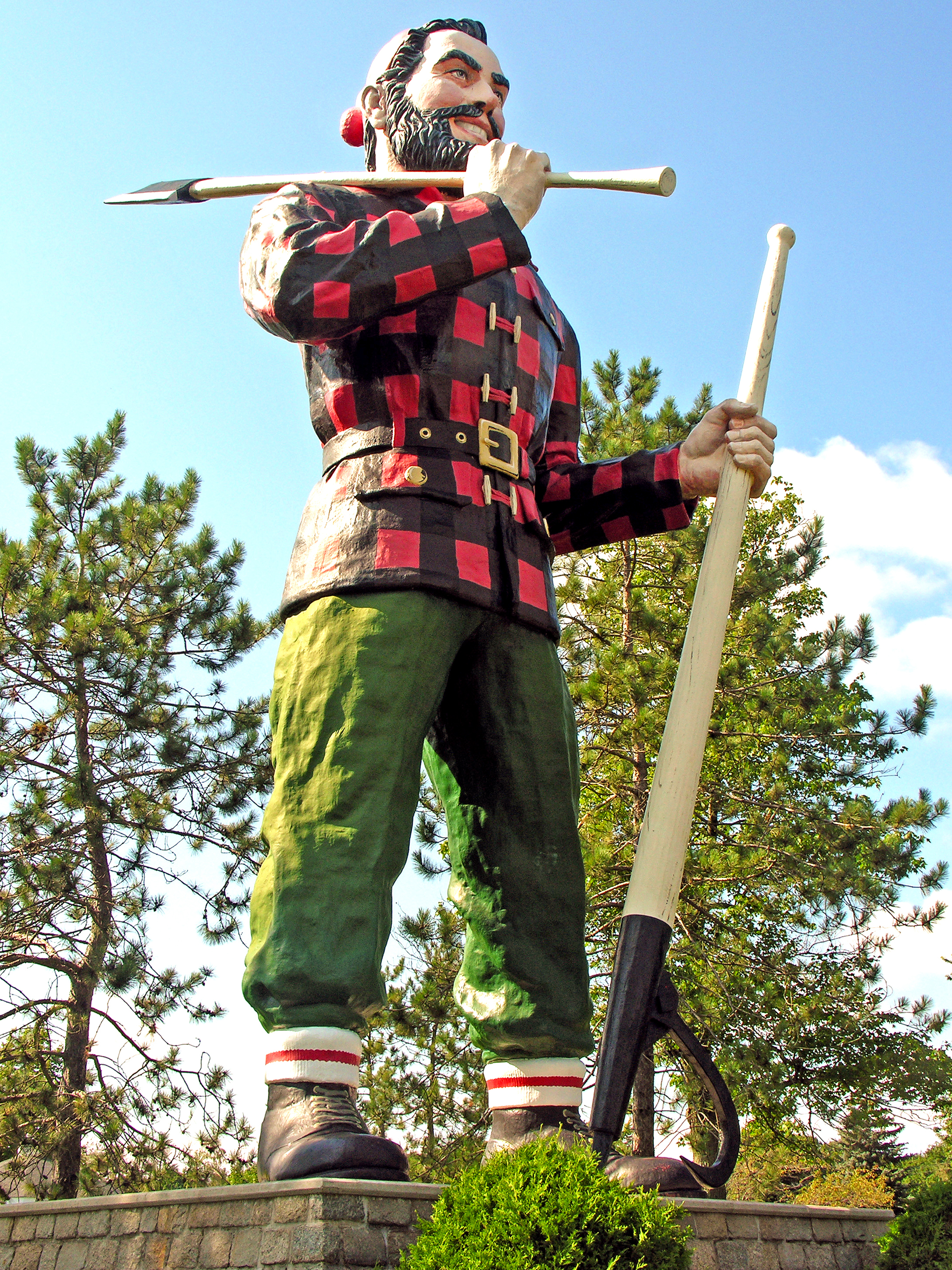
- Paul Bunyan statue in Bangor, Maine
- Birthplace: Various claimed: Bemidji, Minnesota; Hayward, Wisconsin; Tomahawk, Wisconsin; Akeley, Minnesota; Brainerd, Minnesota; Bangor, Maine; Halifax, Nova Scotia; Manistique, Michigan; Oscoda, Michigan

In-universe information
- Full name: Paul Bunyan
- Species: Giant
- Occupation: Lumberjack
- Nationality: French-Canadian/Canadian/American

Paul Bunyan is a giant lumberjack and folk hero in American and Canadian folklore. His tall tales revolve around his superhuman labors, and he is customarily accompanied by Babe the Blue Ox (French: Babe le bœuf bleu), his pet and working animal. The character first appeared in print in 1893 but originated earlier in the oral tradition of North American loggers. Paul Bunyan was more widely popularized by freelance writer William B. Laughead (1882–1958) in a 1916 promotional pamphlet for the Red River Lumber Company. He has been the subject of various literary compositions, musical pieces, commercial works, and theatrical productions. His likeness is displayed in a number of oversized statues across North America.

== Etymology ==
There are many hypotheses about the etymology of the name Paul Bunyan. Much of the commentary focuses on a French-Canadian origin for the name. Phonetically, Bunyan is similar to the Québécois expression "bon yenne!" expressing surprise or astonishment. The English surname Bunyan is derived from the same root as "bunion" in the Old French bugne, referring to a large lump or swelling. Several researchers have attempted to trace Paul Bunyan to the character of Bon Jean of French Canadian folklore.

== Early references ==
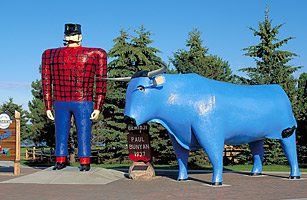
The first Paul Bunyan statue (Bemidji, Minnesota)

Michael Edmonds states in his 2009 book Out of the Northwoods: The Many Lives of Paul Bunyan that Paul Bunyan stories circulated for at least thirty years before finding their way into print. In contrast to the lengthy narratives abundant in published material, Paul Bunyan "stories" when told in the lumbercamp bunkhouses were presented in short fragments. Some of these stories include motifs from older folktales, such as absurdly severe weather and fearsome critters. Parallels in early printings support the view that at least a handful of Bunyan stories hold a common origin in folklore.

The first known reference of Paul Bunyan in print appeared in the March 17, 1893, issue of Gladwin County Record. Under the local news section for the area of Beaverton, it reads, "Paul Bunion [sic] is getting ready while the water is high to take his drive out." This line was presumably an inside joke, as it appeared over fifteen years before any commercial use of the Paul Bunyan name. At the time, few of the general public would have known who Paul Bunyan was.

The earliest recorded story of Paul Bunyan is an uncredited 1904 editorial in the Duluth News Tribune which recounts:

His pet joke and the one with which the green horn at the camp is sure to be tried, consists of a series of imaginative tales about the year Paul Bunyan lumbered in North Dakota. The great Paul is represented as getting out countless millions of timber in the year of the "blue snow". The men's shanty in his camp covered a half section, and the mess camp was a stupendous affair. The range on which an army of cookees prepared the beans and "red horse" was so long that when the cook wanted to grease it up for the purpose of baking the wheat cakes in the morning, they strapped two large hams to his feet and started him running up and down a half mile of black glistening stove top.

Each of these elements recurs in later accounts, including logging the Dakotas, a giant camp, the winter of the blue snow, and stove skating. All four anecdotes are mirrored in J. E. Rockwell's "Some Lumberjack Myths" six years later, and James MacGillivray wrote on the subject of stove skating in "Round River" four years before that.

MacGillivray's account, somewhat extended, reappeared in The American Lumberman in 1910. The American Lumberman followed up with a few sporadic editorials, such as "Paul Bunyan's Oxen", "In Paul Bunyan's Cook Shanty", and "Chronicle of Life and Works of Mr. Paul Bunyan". Rockwell's earlier story was one of the few to allude to Paul Bunyan's large stature, "eight feet tall and weighed 300 pounds", and introduce his big blue ox, before Laughead commercialized Paul Bunyan, although W. D. Harrigan referred to a giant pink ox in "Paul Bunyan's Oxen", circa 1914. In all the articles, Paul Bunyan is praised as a logger of great physical strength and unrivaled skill.

== Laughead's influence ==
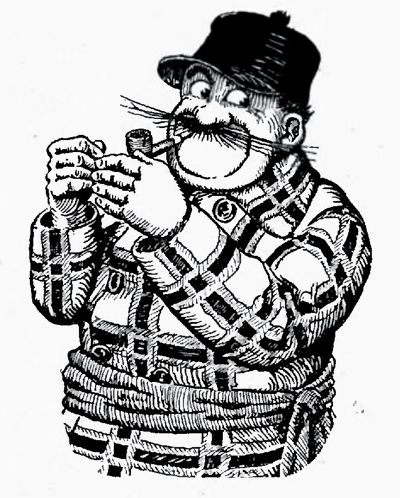
Paul Bunyan as depicted by William B. Laughead

In 1916, advertising copywriter William B. Laughead wrote an advertising pamphlet for the Red River Lumber Company using the Paul Bunyan folk character. Laughead's first endeavor was a pamphlet entitled "Introducing Mr. Paul Bunyan of Westwood, California", but it did not prove effective. It was not until "Tales about Paul Bunyan, Vol. II" appeared that the campaign gained momentum. Laughead took many liberties with the original oral source material, embellishing older exploits and adding some of his own. Among other things, Laughead gave the name "Babe" to the blue ox, created the first pictorial representation of Bunyan, and increased Paul Bunyan's height to impossible proportions (in Laughead's version, Paul Bunyan towers over trees, while in the earlier folktales Bunyan had been extraordinarily tall and strong, but of human proportions).

Laughead attributes the creation of several American landscapes, landmarks and natural wonders to Paul Bunyan. He wrote that Paul Bunyan and Babe are said to have created the 10,000 lakes of Minnesota by their footprints. Later writers made up more details and exploits, such as the creation of bodies of water including Lake Bemidji (which has a shape somewhat resembling a giant footprint when viewed from above). Later authors, and possibly tourist agents, would add other geographic features to those Paul Bunyan was supposed to have created.

Stories about Bunyan credited him with creating the Grand Canyon by pulling his ax behind him, and Mount Hood by putting stones on his campfire.

Later authors have invented tales of Paul Bunyan's finding a female giant as a spouse, such as in the tale "Paul Bunyan's Wife"; her first name is not revealed in the story, she is only referred to as "Mrs. Paul". The tale also mentions her having had a daughter nicknamed "Tiny". Adèle de Leeuw wrote another tale, "Paul Bunyan Finds A Wife", which describes Paul's rescuing a lovely red-haired giant-lady who had been trapped underneath an avalanche after a great storm; The grateful maiden (fittingly named "Sylvia", after the Latin word for "forest") quickly falls in love with the kind and chivalrous "treetop-tall" bachelor, and marries him later that same day.

This burial of the original material under stories by commercial writers engendered confusion over whether Bunyan had ever even been a genuine folkloric character at all, although later research has established this.

The Laughead pamphlets remain popular, collected in a single volume titled The Marvelous Exploits of Paul Bunyan.

== In Ojibwe folklore ==
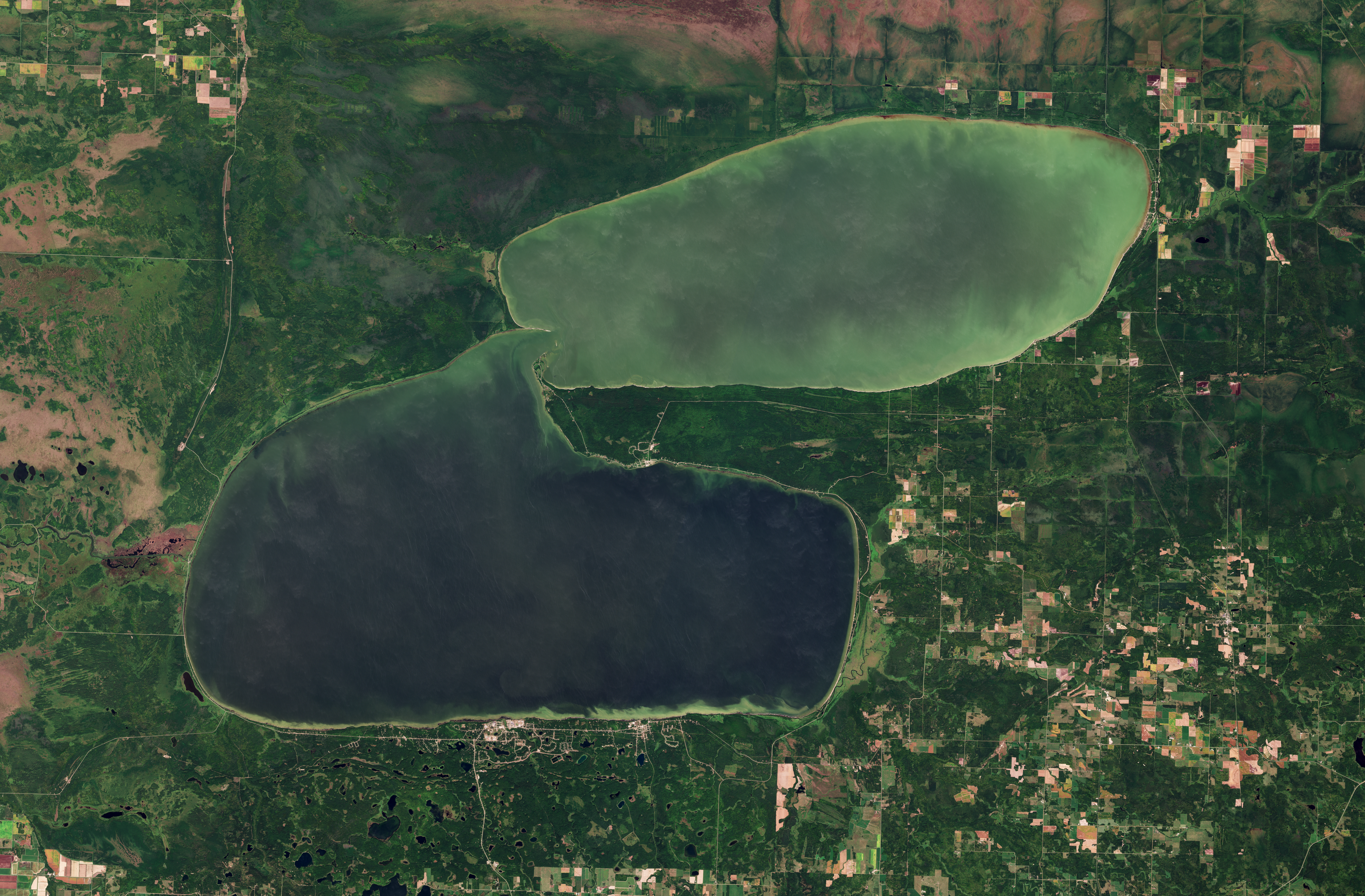
Red Lake (Minnesota)

The figure of Bunyan was adapted by the Ojibwe people into folklore about Nanabozho, a culture hero of the Ojibwe and Anishinaabe.

In the story, when Paul Bunyan came to log the forests of Northern Minnesota, Nanabozho fought him in defense of the forest. They fought for three days; Nanabozho finally slapped Bunyan with a giant walleye. Bunyan was knocked onto his buttocks in the mud, the imprint of which formed Red Lake, Minnesota. This is responsible for the lake's distinctive shape and the preservation of the Chippewa National Forest and Boundary Waters Canoe Area Wilderness.

== Children's adaptations ==
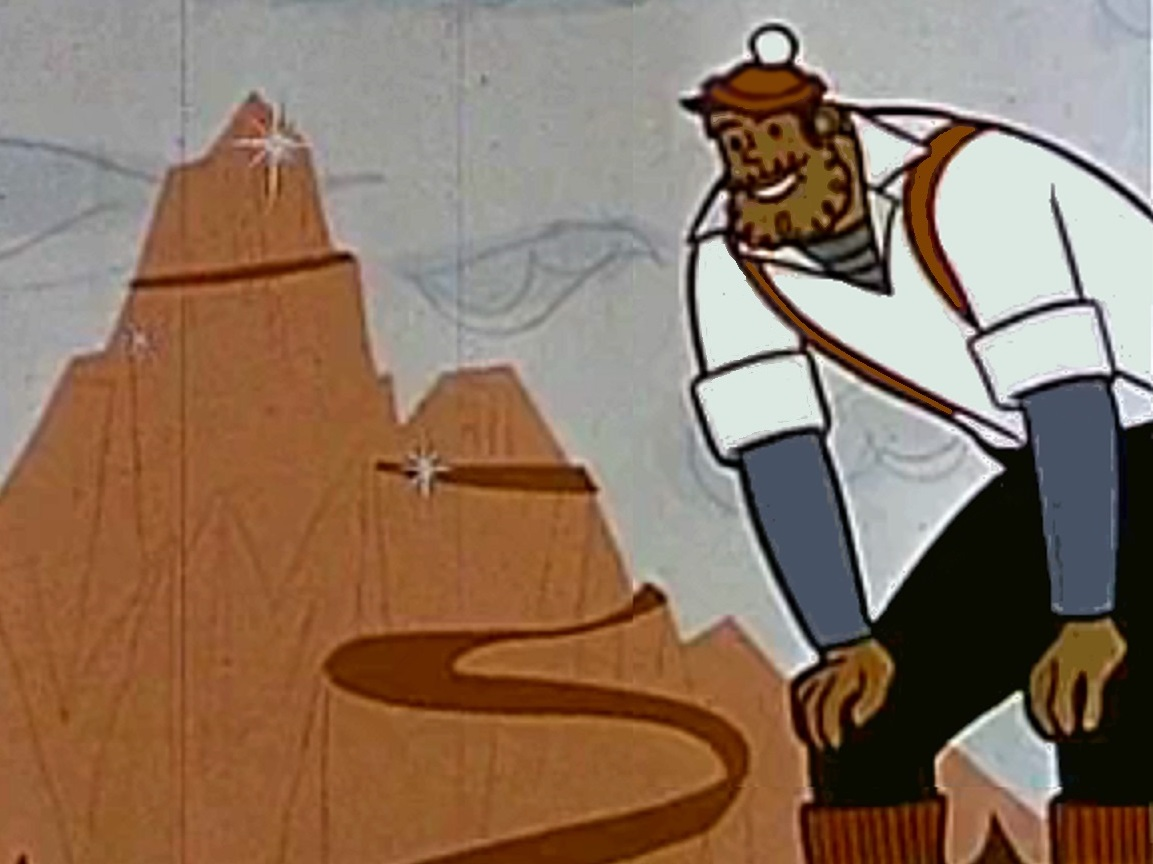
A still from the 1960 Mel-O-Toons cartoon Paul Bunyan. Typical among juvenile accounts, the cartoon features Paul Bunyan batting cannonballs in the American Revolutionary War, sinking pirate ships, and building the Big Rock Candy Mountain.

Running at variance to his origins in folklore, the character of Paul Bunyan has become a fixture for juvenile audiences since his debut in print. Typical among such adaptations is the further embellishment of stories pulled directly from William B. Laughead's pamphlet, and with very few elements from oral tradition adapted into them. Nearly all of the literature is presented in long narrative format, exaggerates Paul Bunyan's height to colossal proportions, and follows him from infancy to adulthood.

Some of the more enduring collections of stories include Paul Bunyan by Esther Shephard (illustrated by Rockwell Kent), Paul Bunyan by James Stevens, Paul Bunyan Swings His Axe by Dell J. McCormick, Paul Bunyan by Esther Shephard, Paul Bunyan and His Great Blue Ox by Wallace Wadsworth, and The Marvelous Exploits of Paul Bunyan by William Laughead.

The Wonderful Adventures of Paul Bunyan as retold by Louis Untermeyer and illustrated by Everett Gee Jackson was published in 1945 by The Heritage Press, an imprint of The George Macy Companies.

Legends of Paul Bunyan (1947) was the first book published by the prolific tall tale writer Harold Felton.

In 1958, Walt Disney Studios produced Paul Bunyan as an animated short musical. In it, Paul competes with his axe in a tree-chopping contest against a steam-powered mechanical saw. The feature starred Thurl Ravenscroft, perhaps best known as the voice of Tony the Tiger for The Kellogg Company, and was nominated for an Academy Award for Best Animated Short Film. The short later appeared in Disney's American Legends.

"Three Tall Tales", a 1963 episode of The Wonderful World of Color, is an animated three-part anthology. The third part is the tale of Paul Bunyan.

In the 1995 Disney film Tall Tale, Paul Bunyan is played by Oliver Platt. Contrary to the usual image of Bunyan's gigantism, Platt's Paul is depicted as a man of average height, but compensated with a "larger than life" personality consistent with the film's "over the top" nature.

In Marybeth Lorbiekci and Renée Grae's 2007 story Paul Bunyan's Sweetheart, Paul marries Lucette Diana Kensack, a giant Meti woman who teaches Paul to be a forester, replanting the forest after logging.

In 2017, an animated film based loosely on the folktale titled Bunyan and Babe was released, starring John Goodman as Paul Bunyan.

== Scholarly research ==
K. Bernice Stewart, a student at the University of Wisconsin, was working contemporaneously with Laughead to gather Paul Bunyan stories from woodsmen in the Midwest. Stewart was able to make a scholarly anthology of original anecdotes through a series of interviews. These were published in 1916 as "Legends of Paul Bunyan, Lumberjack" in Transactions of the Wisconsin Academy of Sciences, Arts and Letters and coauthored by her English professor Homer A. Watt. The research relates traditional narratives, some in multiple versions, and goes on to conclude that many probably existed in some part before they were set to revolve around Bunyan as a central character. Stewart argued in her analysis that Paul Bunyan belongs to a class of traveler's tales.

Bunyan was a powerful giant, seven feet tall and with a stride of seven feet. He was famous throughout the lumbering districts for his great physical strength.

— K. Bernice Stewart & Homer A. Watt, "Legends of Paul Bunyan, Lumberjack"

Charles E. Brown was the curator of the Museum of the State Historical Society of Wisconsin and secretary of the Wisconsin Archaeological Society. He was another principal researcher who recorded early Paul Bunyan stories from lumberjacks. He published these anecdotes in short pamphlet format for the use of students of folklore. Much of his research was financed through the government-funded Wisconsin Writers' Program.

In 2007, Michael Edmonds of the Wisconsin Historical Society began a thorough reinvestigation of the Paul Bunyan tradition, publishing his findings in Out of the Northwoods: The Many Lives of Paul Bunyan. Edmonds concluded that Paul Bunyan had origins in the oral traditions of woodsmen working in Wisconsin camps during the turn of the 20th century, but such stories were heavily embellished and popularized by commercial interests.

=== Debated authenticity ===
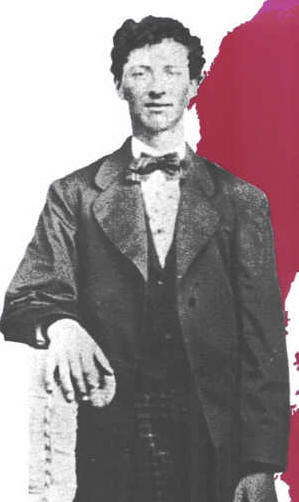
Fournier in 1865

Commentators such as Carleton C. Ames, Marshall Fitwick, and particularly Richard Dorson cite Paul Bunyan as an example of "fakelore", a literary invention passed off as an older folktale. They point out that the majority of books about Paul Bunyan are composed almost entirely of elements with no basis in folklore, especially those targeted at juvenile audiences. Modern commercial writers are credited with setting Paul Bunyan on his rise to a nationally recognized figure, but this ignores the historical roots of the character in logging camps and forest industries.

At the same time, several authors have come forward to propose that the legend of Paul Bunyan was based on a real person. D. Laurence Rogers and others have suggested a possible connection between Paul Bunyan tales and the exploits of French-Canadian lumberjack Fabian "Saginaw Joe" Fournier (1845–1875). From 1865 to 1875, Fournier worked for the H. M. Loud Company in the Grayling, Michigan, area. James Stevens in his 1925 book Paul Bunyan makes another unverified claim that Paul Bunyan was a soldier in the Papineau Rebellion named Paul Bon Jean, and this is occasionally repeated in other accounts.

Stewart and Watt acknowledge that they have not yet succeeded in definitively finding out whether Bunyan was based on an actual person or was wholly mythical. They have noted, however, that some of the older lumberjacks whom they interviewed claimed to have known him or members of his crew, and the supposed location of his grave was actually pointed out in northern Minnesota. Bunyan's extreme gigantism was a later invention, and early stories either do not mention it or, as in the Stewart and Watt paper, refer to him as being about seven feet tall.

Included in this section is a comparison chart between early Paul Bunyan references, the Stewart and Watt paper, and the Laughead advertisement.

Overlap of early Paul Bunyan reprintings
	Duluth News	Rockwell	MacGillivray	Harrigan	Stewart & Watt	Laughead
Stove Skating	✓	✓	✓	✓	✓	✓
Pea Soup Lake	✗	(Note: In Rockwell's version it was beans and not peas that were spilled in the lake.)	✓	✗	✓	✓
Giant Camp	✓	✓	✗	✓	✗	✓
Gigantism	✗	✓	✗	✗	✓	(Note: Rather than simply being abnormally tall, Paul Bunyan's height is increased beyond all possible human capacity.)
Winter of the Blue Snow	✓	✓	✗	✗	✓	✓
Blue Ox	✗	✓	✗	(Note: In Harrigan's account Paul Bunyon [sic] is said to have a pink ox named "Old Brinny".)	✓	✓
Logging the Dakotas	✓	✓	✗	✗	✗	✓
Creating Geography	✗	✗	✗	✗	✗	✓

== In popular culture ==
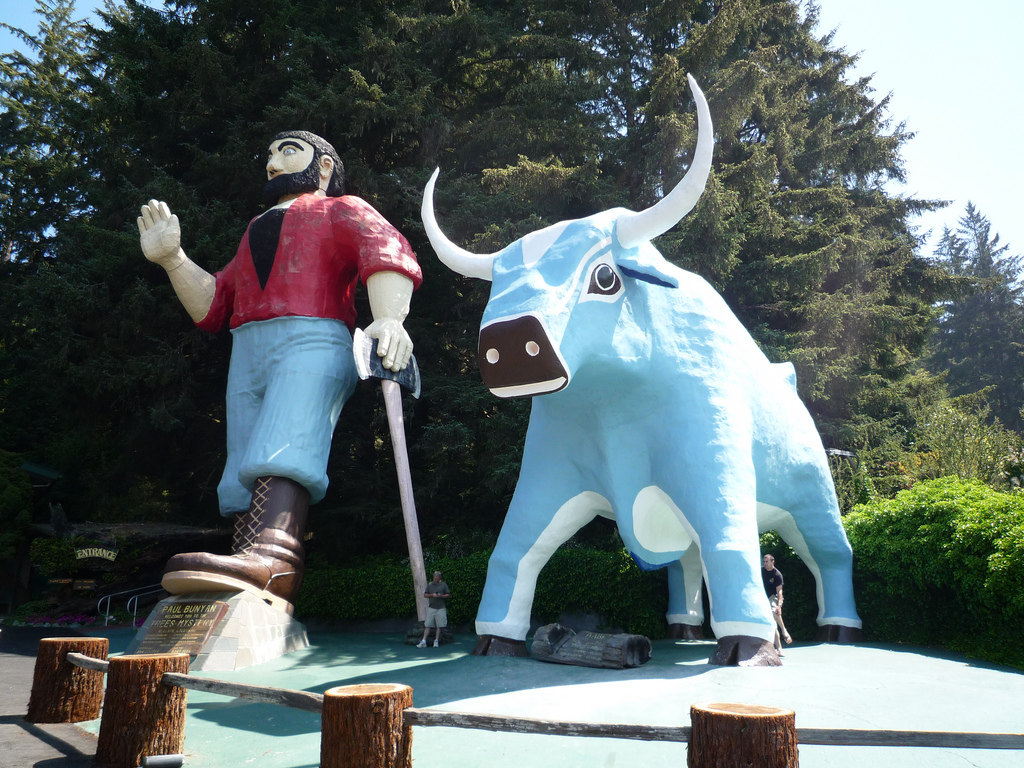
Paul Bunyan (49 foot) and Babe the Blue Ox (35 foot) statues at Trees of Mystery near Klamath, California. Note the size of the visitors at Babe's hooves.

William Laughead's 1916 ad campaign for the Red River Lumber Company launched Paul Bunyan toward national fame, and established his marketing appeal which continues into the 21st century. Throughout the better part of the 20th century, Paul Bunyan's name and image continued to be used to promote various products, cities, and services. Across North America, giant statues of Paul Bunyan were erected to promote local businesses and tourism. A significant portion of these were produced from the 1960s through the 1970s by the company International Fiberglass as part of their "muffler man" series of giant fiberglass sculptures.

Since 2014 a paved biking trail bears the name "Paul Bunyan Trail" and spans 120 miles, from Crow Wing State Park to Lake Bemidji State Park in Minnesota. Many cities through which the trail passes sell Paul Bunyan trinkets and novelty items. The Bemidji Blue Ox Marathon (started in 2013) runs along the Paul Bunyan State Trail, around Lake Bemidji and past the Paul Bunyan and Babe the Blue Ox statues. The Bemidji statues of Paul Bunyan and Babe, the blue ox, appear in the Fargo television series.

His statue is also briefly shown in the film Fargo from 1996.

The statue of Paul Bunyan located in Bangor, Maine, is regularly mentioned in the novel It by Stephen King.

A 2024 advert for Apple Pay features a collection of commemorative plates. The protagonist is sitting in her armchair when she discovers a ‘Babe the blue ox’ plate. It is the final missing piece in her collection and she buys it. It appears she is buying it for Paul Bunyan who seems to be looking out from his plate.

== See also ==
- Big Joe Mufferaw
- Cordwood Pete, said to be the younger brother of Paul
- Fearsome critters
- Joe Magarac
- John Henry (folklore)
- Korean axe murder incident, including Operation Paul Bunyan
- Paul Bunyan (operetta)
- Paul Bunyan's Axe (trophy)
- Paul Bunyan Trophy
- Statue of Paul Bunyan (Portland, Oregon)
- Tall tale
