= Old Crow Wing, Minnesota =

Ghost town in Crow Wing County, Minnesota, US

Coordinates: 46°16′38″N 94°20′15″W

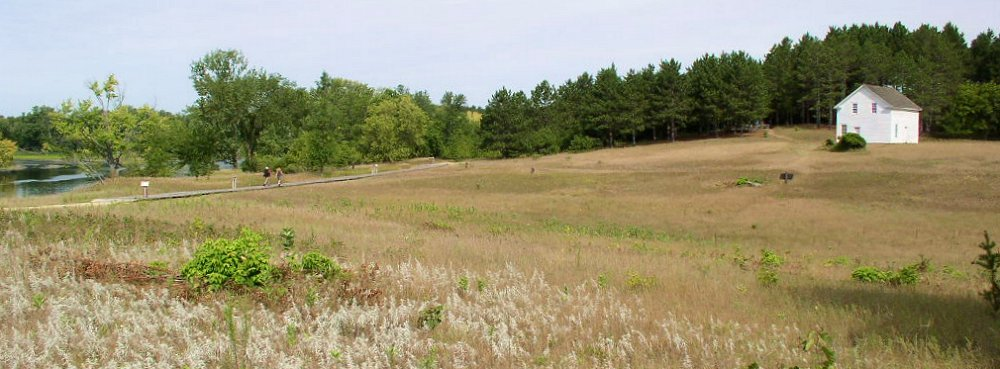
The 1849 Beaulieu House, returned to the former townsite in 1988, overlooks the Mississippi River in Crow Wing State Park.

Old Crow Wing is a ghost town in Fort Ripley Township, Crow Wing County, Minnesota, United States, at the confluence of the Mississippi and Crow Wing rivers. Long occupied by the Ojibwe people, for over a century it was also the northernmost European-American settlement on the Mississippi.

In the 1850s and 1860s, Crow Wing was a county seat and one of the major population centers of Minnesota. At its peak it had an estimated 600–700 residents, about half of whom were Ojibwe. The town site, including one restored house, is preserved within Crow Wing State Park.

== History ==
This area was inhabited by indigenous peoples for thousands of years before the first encounter with Europeans. At the confluence of the Crow Wing and Mississippi rivers, the site of the village of Old Crow Wing became a logical meeting place for the Dakota and later Ojibwe of Minnesota.

Old Crow Wing's strategic location also made it attractive to European traders, the first of them recorded shortly after the close of the French and Indian War in 1763. The first trader of note to spend time at Old Crow Wing was James McGill in the winter of 1771–2, followed by many others. It also seems likely that two British army officers of the 54th Regiment of Foot visited the site in the early autumn of 1789, although the nature of this visit is disputed.

The first European-American settler in Crow Wing was Allan Morrison, who opened a trading post in 1823. Around this time a lucrative, if technically illegal (because of post-War of 1812 restrictions on trading with Canadians) trade developed between Saint Paul, Minnesota, and the Red River Colony in Canada. Many of the fur trappers and traders were Métis, the biracial descendants of Ojibwe women and French, Scots and English men. Because the Ojibwe had a patrilineal system, in which children belonged to the father's clan and took their places in the tribe through it, the children of white fathers had no true place in the tribe. Generally the trappers and their Ojibwe wives lived near the tribe, which would extend protection, but their children had to make their way outside it. Over generations, the Métis have developed as a distinct ethnic group in Canada, with characteristic cultural patterns, and they have won recognition of political status.

Since the Red River Trails crossed territory of the Dakota, the Ojibwe's traditional enemy, conflicts dogged the trade. A Métis attack on the Dakota in 1844 closed the primary route entirely. A Red River ox cart train on its return trip north traveled instead to the growing town of Crow Wing, forded the Mississippi, and blazed a new route that passed through much friendlier Ojibwe lands. This route became known as the Woods Trail. Although it was considerably harder going than the other Red River Trails, it was decidedly safer. More traffic followed, particularly whenever relations with the Dakota were at their worst.

The village of Crow Wing became the principal supply station on the Woods Trail. Allan Morrison began operating a ferry across the Mississippi at the north end of town. In the 1840s other traders set up shop as well. This was the center of a multicultural community, with numerous mixed-race families, and associated Ojibwe, French Canadian and American families in the area.

Allan and his brother William Morrison, as well as the traders William Alexander Aitken, and Henry Mower Rice all went on to early prominence in the territory and state. Minnesota's Morrison, Aitkin, and Rice counties were named after them. Mower served as a state senator for five years and ran for governor in 1865. Clement Hudon Beaulieu, a Métis, also became a successful trader, running the American Fur Company's trading post.

The American William Whipple Warren was bilingual and worked as an interpreter for Rice. Also of Ojibwe descent, he interviewed Ojibwe elders and completed his classic History of the Ojibway People in 1853. (It was published by the Minnesota Historical Society in 1885.) Warren married Mathilda Aitken, daughter of the fur trader William and his Ojibwe wife. Warren was elected to the territorial legislature in 1850.

Several important Ojibwe leaders lived in Crow Wing, including Curly Head, Hole in the Day and his father, and Strong Ground. Henry Rice negotiated with them for logging rights to their land, and logging became a significant industry in Crow Wing.

In 1848, the U.S. Army established Fort Ripley nearby. Reflecting success in the fur trade, in 1849 Clement Beaulieu had a house built in the popular Greek Revival style. Father Francis Xavier Pierz established a Catholic mission in Crow Wing in 1852, later headed by Lovrenc Lavtižar. An Episcopal mission was built in 1856, and a Lutheran church soon after.

Two events brought Crow Wing's heyday to a swift end. In 1868, the United States resettled the Ojibwe, including Clement and Elizabeth Beaulieu, to the White Earth Indian Reservation in northwestern Minnesota.

In 1871, the railroad magnate James J. Hill decided to route his Northern Pacific Railway over the Mississippi River at Brainerd, ten miles to the north and bypassing Crow Wing. A year later the county made Brainerd its seat of government, and businesses and population followed.

By 1880, most of Crow Wing's residents had moved on. Two of Beaulieu's nephews moved their uncle's former house to Morrison County, where it was inhabited continuously into the 1980s. After Larry and Joyce Moran of Little Falls donated the house to the Minnesota Department of Natural Resources, the house was moved back to its original location in 1988, now within Crow Wing State Park.
