= Crow Wing State Park =

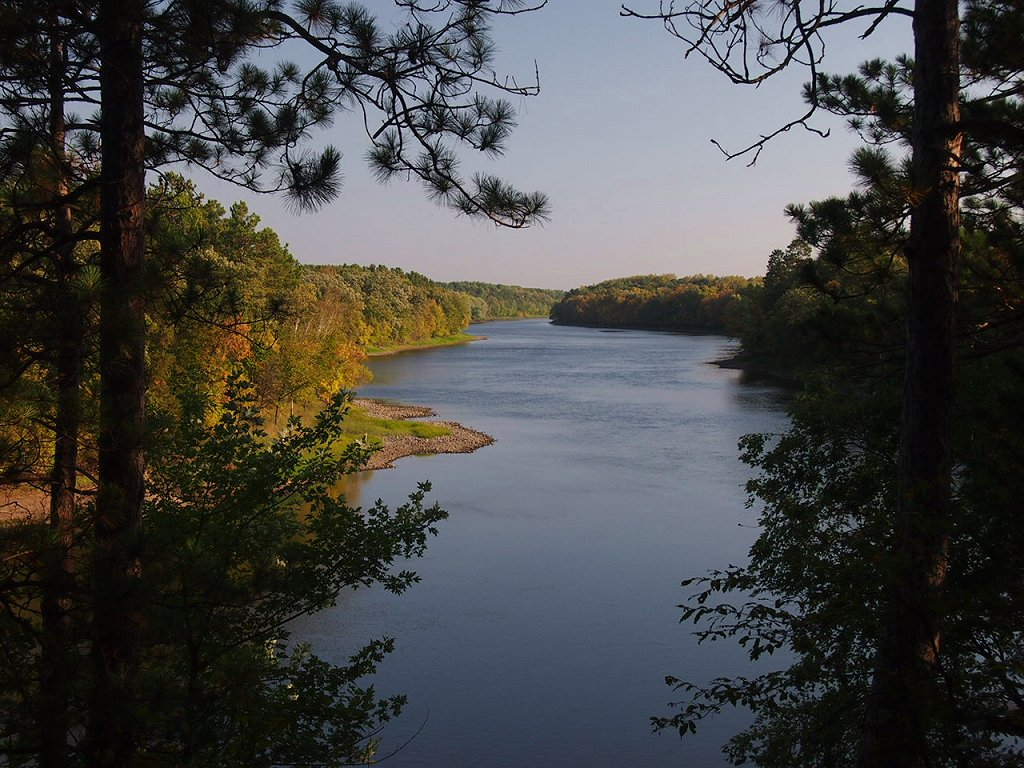
- The Mississippi River from Chippewa Lookout in Crow Wing State Park

- Location within Minnesota Location within the United States
- Location: Minnesota, United States
- Coordinates: 46°16′20″N 94°20′00″W
- Area: 3,119 acres (12.62 km^{2})
- Elevation: 1,158 ft (353 m)
- Established: 1959
- Governing body: Minnesota Department of Natural Resources

- Crow Wing State Park
- U.S. National Register of Historic Places
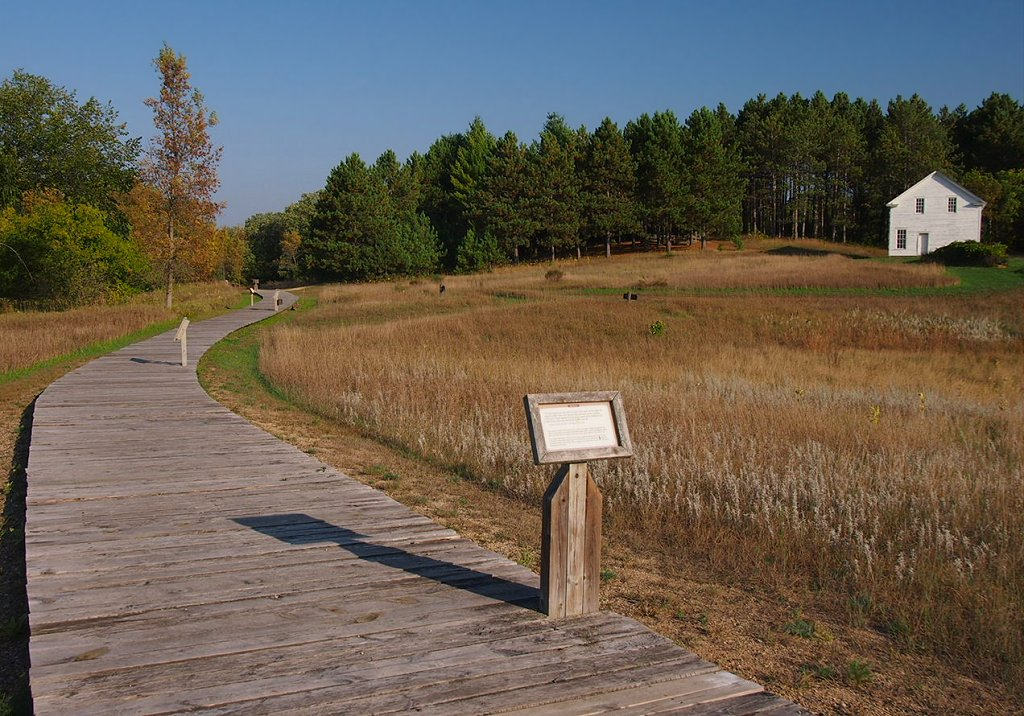
- Townsite of Old Crow Wing, with the Clement Beaulieu House in the distance
- Location: Fort Ripley Township, Crow Wing County, Minnesota
- NRHP reference No.: 70000288
- Added to NRHP: July 28, 1970

Crow Wing State Park

Crow Wing State Park is a state park of Minnesota, United States, at the confluence of the Mississippi and Crow Wing Rivers. The park interprets the site of Old Crow Wing, one of the most populous towns in Minnesota in the 1850s and 1860s. The entire park was added to the National Register of Historic Places in 1970. A section of the Red River Trails that passed through Old Crow Wing is also separately listed on the National Register.

== Natural history ==
The park lies on an outwash plain formed from the outwash of Glacial Lake Grantsburg. The present-day vegetation is oak forest with red, white, and jack pine; and aspen, with prairie and wetland openings.

== Wildlife ==
It is home to wildlife species such as coyote, white-tailed deer, eagle, beaver, hawk, muskrat, waterfowl, fox, and various songbirds.

== Cultural history ==
=== Native American history ===
The confluence of the Crow Wing and Mississippi Rivers formed a natural crossroads, attracting humans with its easy travel routes and quality hunting. At the beginning of the historical period the region was inhabited by Dakota, who clashed with Ojibwe being displaced from farther east. It is told that in 1768 a Dakota war party raided an Ojibwe village and carried off several women in their canoes. The village's warriors, returning from their own unsuccessful raid, laid an ambush on a high bank over the river, digging shallow pits from which to fire their rifles. As the Dakota convoy passed under the Ojibwe, the men opened fire, while the captured women overturned the canoes they were in and swam for shore. The Dakota regrouped and counterattacked by land, but were repulsed. The two-day battle cemented Ojibwe control over the area.

=== Old Crow Wing ===
European fur traders began frequenting the area in the late 18th century. A trading post was opened in 1823, around which a town slowly grew. The town lay on the route of a new section of the Red River Trails blazed in 1844, and the local economy boomed. Several Crow Wing traders went on to great prominence in early Minnesota, including the men after whom Morrison County, Aitkin County, and Rice County are all named. A Métis named Clement Hudon Beaulieu ran the American Fur Company's trading post while another named William Whipple Warren wrote an early history of the Ojibwe. Three churches were established in town, including a Catholic mission by Father Francis Xavier Pierz.

Crow Wing's heyday came to a swift end. In 1868 the Ojibwe were resettled in the White Earth Indian Reservation. In 1871 railroad magnate James J. Hill decided to route his Northern Pacific Railroad over the Mississippi River in Brainerd, 10 miles (16 km) to the north. By 1880 most of Crow Wing's residents had moved on.

=== Park development ===
The Crow Wing County Historical Society led efforts to establish a state park around the townsite. The park was authorized by the Minnesota Legislature in 1959. Some controversy arose when the Knights of Columbus built a chapel on the site of Father Pierz' mission. However the chapel was located on a small parcel of privately held land and no public funds were used for its construction, so legally separation of church and state was maintained.

State funds and private donations enabled the park to expand by 552 acres (223 ha) in 2006, adding 3.13 miles (5.04 km) of frontage on the Mississippi River. The Paul Bunyan State Trail extends through Crow Wing State Park.

== Recreation ==
Crow Wing State Park offers 14 miles (23 km) of hiking trails, some of which are open to cross-country skiing or snowmobiling in winter. There is a campground with 61 sites and a camper cabin. There is also a group camp and a riverside campsite for canoeists. A boat ramp provides access to the rivers, with rental craft available.

Although most of the structures of Old Crow Wing have decayed or were moved away, some are left and interpretive signs commemorate others. Clement Beaulieu's house, with its Greek Revival architecture, was moved back to its original location in 1988. Several headstones are still visible in the Catholic cemetery. Oldest of all, the shallow depressions marked as the Indian Rifle Pits may be the vestiges of the 1768 Ojibwe ambush.
