= Lake Bemidji =

Lake in the state of Minnesota, United States

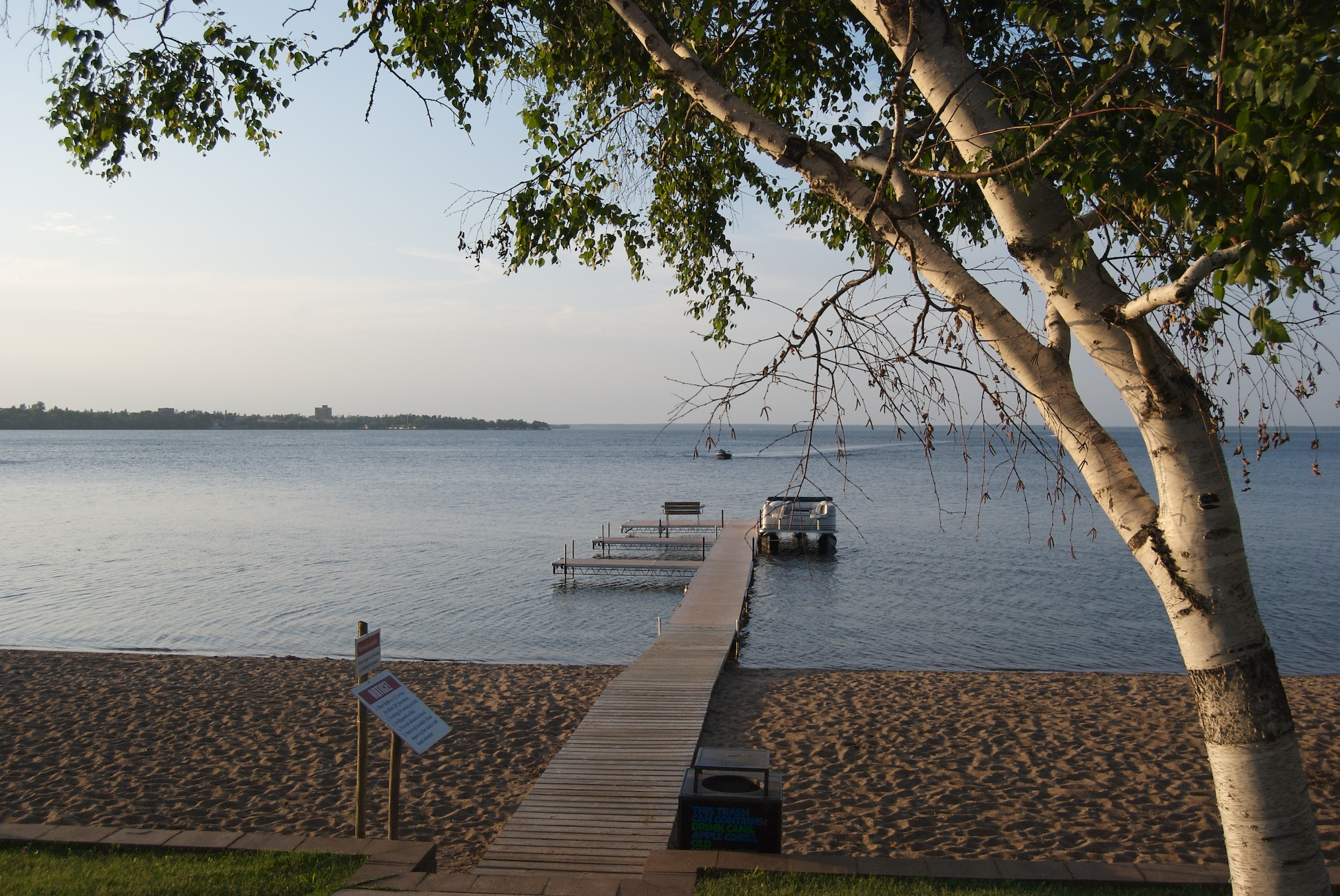

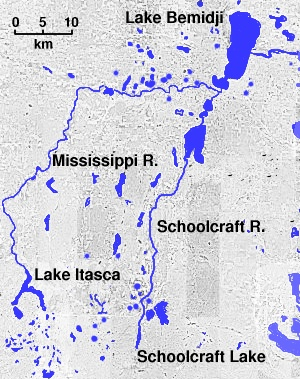
- Lake Bemidji, near the headwaters of the Mississippi River

- Location within Minnesota
- Location: Beltrami County, Minnesota, U.S.
- Coordinates: 47°28′19″N 094°52′35″W
- Primary inflows: Mississippi River
- Primary outflows: Mississippi River
- Basin countries: United States
- Surface area: 28 km^{2} (11 sq mi)

Lake Bemidji is a small glacially-formed lake, approximately 11 square miles (28,000,000 m^{2}; 7,000 acres; 2,800 ha) in area, in northern Minnesota in the United States. Located less than 50 miles (80 km) downstream from the source of the Mississippi River, it both receives and is drained by the Mississippi, and is the northernmost point on the river.

== Name ==
The name Bemidji is a mutation of the Ojibwe bemidjigamaag, meaning "lake with crossing waters". This refers to the Mississippi River, and how it flows across the lake from west to east.

== Geography ==
The lake is located in southern Beltrami County, near the city of Bemidji, which sits on its southwestern shore. Due to the shape of Lakes Bemidji and Irving, according to folk legends, Lakes Bemidji and Irving were formed in Paul Bunyan's footprint. The Ojibwe described the Lakes Bemidji and Irving collectively as a single lake being a bimijigamaa (lake that traverses another body of water), thus the Ojibwe name the lake as Bemijigamaag-zaaga'igan (Traversing Lake), since the lake is considered to traverse the Mississippi River.

On occasion in Ojibwe, the city of Bemidji is called Wabigamaang (at the lake channel/narrows), since part of the city is situated on the Lakes Bemidji-Irving narrows, located on the south end of Lake Bemidji.

Lake Bemidji resides in the upper Mississippi River drainage basin. Over 396,000 acres (160,000 ha) of the Upper Mississippi watershed drain into Lake Bemidji. The lake has roughly 15 miles of shoreline.

== Ecology ==
The littoral zone of Lake Bemidji covers roughly 28% of the total lake area. There are no invasive species known in the lake as of 2017.

The water clarity (assessed using a Secchi disk) ranges from 2.5 to 21.0, with a maximum reading usually obtained in early summer. Transparency is high in May and June and declines through August. The transparency then rebounds in October after fall turnover. This transparency dynamic is typical of a northern Minnesota lake. The lake has been classified as eutrophic by the Beltrami County Soil and Water Conservation District.

There are many fish species that inhabit Lake Bemidji, including: black bullhead, black crappie, bluegill, brown bullhead, burbot, green sunfish, hybrid sunfish, lake whitefish, largemouth bass, Lepomis sp., muskellunge, northern pike, pumpkinseed, rock bass, tullibee (cisco), walleye, yellow bullhead, yellow perch, bowfin (dogfish), greater redhorse, redhorse, shorthead redhorse, white sucker, banded killifish, blackchin shiner, blacknose shiner, bluntnose minnow, brassy minnow, brook stickleback, central mudminnow, common shiner, fathead minnow, finescale dace, golden shiner, Iowa darter, Johnny darter, logperch, longnose dace, mimic shiner, spottail shiner, tadpole madtom.

== History ==
The Beltrami County Historical Society documents that "The first residents of the Bemidji area in recorded history were Native Americans who settled Northern Minnesota following the retreat of the glaciers around 10,000 years ago." Evidence of the retreating glaciers exists today in Bemidji's lush wilderness, Lake Bemidji, and other bodies of water found within Beltrami County. As time progressed, the Bemidji area (as well as Lake Bemidji) became inhabited by different Native American tribes. First, the Dakota (who settled in the 1600s) followed by the Ojibwe in the 1700s. The Ojibwe would ultimately become the presiding tribe throughout the 1700s and into the 1800s.

=== Chief Shaynowishkung ===
Historical leader Chief Shaynowishkung (Chief Bemidji) of the Ojibwe was born in 1834 and died in 1904. The Beltrami County Historical Society documents that "Shaynowishkung's people came from Madeline Island originally, moving to Sandy Lake, then Winnibigoshish, finally settling along the shore of Bemijigamaag." According to the plaques which are engraved near Shaynowishkung's Honorary Statue (located near the south side of Lake Bemidji), the chief moved to Lake Bemidji in 1882 after the death of his wife. In 1888, he was first reported to have contact with neighboring white settlers. During their first meeting, the local namesake "Chief Bemidji" was wrongfully given by European immigrants due to what the Beltrami Historical Society documents as "early miscommunication" as when "Shaynowishkung told them the name of the lake [Bemijigamaag], which they at first took to be his name". As a result, he became known "throughout his life as Chief Bemidji."

=== Logging mills ===
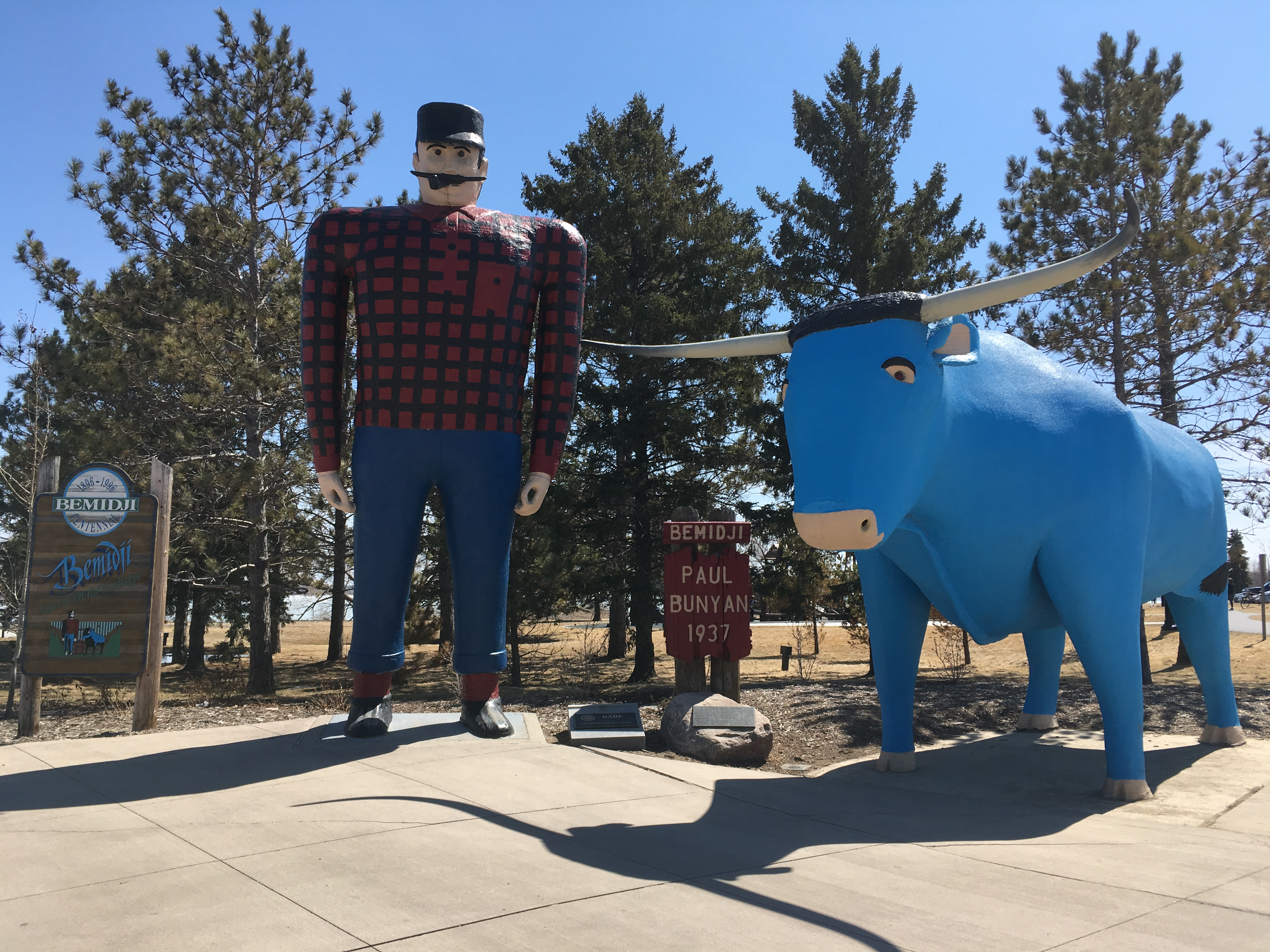
Paul Bunyan and Babe the Blue Ox have stood near the south shore of Lake Bemidji since 1937.

As time progressed, the main economic source of the Bemidji area became logging mills. The Crookston Sawmill opened in 1903 and was located along the south shore of Lake Bemidji. The sawmill was one of the first prominent logging industries within the Bemidji area and soon expanded tremendously. In the year 1910, Crookston Sawmill had become the second largest sawmill in the country, expanding Bemidji's economy (volume of business) to 18th within the state. Unfortunately, timber production made the sawmill prone to fire. The fires which took place at the sawmill during the 1910s and early 1920s which burned the mills to the ground twice foreshadowed the final fire of the newly rebuilt Crookston mill #1. According to Historian Rosemary Given-Amble, "on November 8, 1924, 24 million board feet of select white pine, valued at $750,000, was destroyed at the second Crookston #1 fire. Heat was so intense it caused whirlwinds that tossed burning lumber across the lake."

=== Drought ===
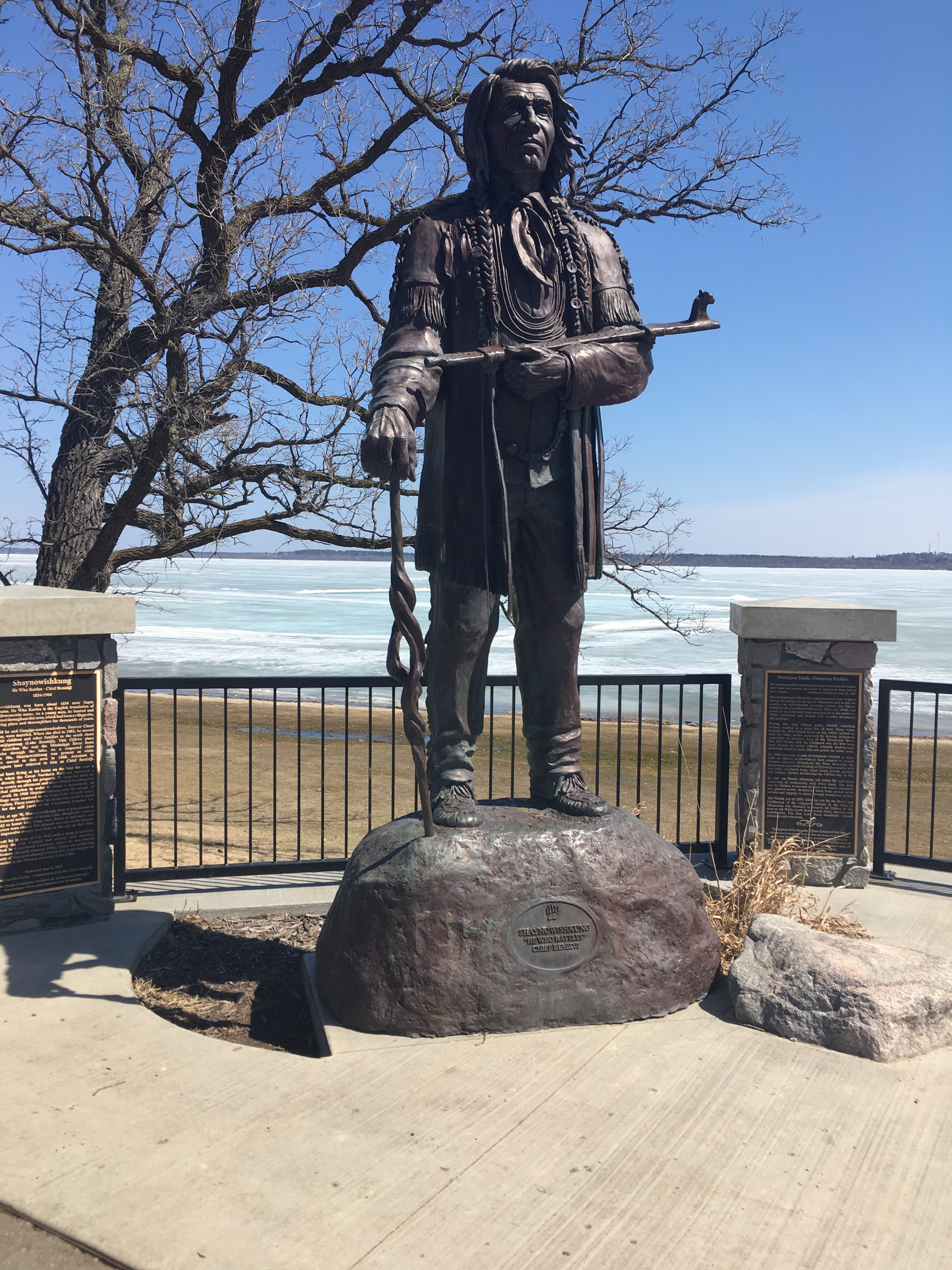
Statue of Chief Shaynowishkung created by Gareth Curtiss. The statue is located on the south shore of Lake Bemidji near Paul and Babe.

According to historian Rosemary Given Amble, "The era between 1907-1910 brought years of drought and local forest fires to northern Minnesota. Because of that dryness the south and north basins of Lake Bemidji were often separated by a sandbar extending from Diamond Point to the east lakeshore, making it difficult to move log booms from the north end of the lake to the mill."

== Paul Bunyan and Babe the Blue Ox ==
The Beltrami Historical society accounts that "Paul Bunyan and Babe the Blue Ox were commissioned to be built in 1936 and were unveiled January 15th 1937." Ever since, the 18 foot lumberjack and his faithful ox have graced the south shore of Lake Bemidji with their presence.

The Bemidji Chamber of Commerce documents that "As some stories go, the idea of building a giant statue of the town’s lumberjack son was conceived over sharing a pint (or two). 737 man hours, and 2.5 tons later, a national tourism legend was proudly born. After more than 50 years of towering Lake Bemidji, the statues were officially honored by the National Park Service as a cultural resource worthy of preservation, adding them to the National Register of Historic Places. Today, the statues of Paul Bunyan and Babe the Blue Ox are recognized as the second most photographed roadside attraction in the nation."

== Recreation ==
The lake is a popular recreational and resort destination. Activities to do on and near the lake include fishing, boating, swimming, water-skiing, tubing, and hiking. Lake Bemidji State Park is along its northern shore. The north trailhead of Paul Bunyan State Trail is located at the state park and adjoins with 16.6 miles of paved trail which runs along the shores of the lake. Historian Rosemary Given-Amble also accounts that the lake is home to some of the largest parks in Bemidji including Diamond Point Park, Cameron Park, Library Park, and South Shore Park. Today, the lake is home to two resorts, a bed and breakfast, Lake Bemidji State Park campground, and multiple hotels situated along the south shore development. The south shore development is a growing infrastructure which is home to multiple businesses, housing complexes, South Shore park, and the Sanford Center.

== See also ==
- Bemidji, Minnesota
- Lake Itasca
- Mississippi River
- Schoolcraft River
- List of Minnesota lakes
- Paul Bunyan
- Lake Bemidji State Park
