= Bemidji Blue Ox Marathon =

- Bemidji Blue Ox Marathon logo
- Date: October 10, 2026
- Location: Bemidji, Minnesota
- Event type: Paved Road, Trail, and Sidewalk
- Distance: 26.2 miles (42.2 km)
- Primary sponsor: Sanford Orthopedics Sports Medicine
- Established: 2013
- Course records: Men: 2:35:32 (2019); Jesse Prince; Women: 2:54:31 (2024); Ellyssa Peterson
- Website: bemidjiblueoxmarathon.com
- Participants: 228

The Bemidji Blue Ox Marathon is a race in Bemidji, Minnesota, first run in 2013. The race runs around a lake, along a state trail and through a state park. It takes place in October, when many of the forest surroundings are bright with color.

The race has grown into a weekend of festivities that includes several races, nearly 1,000 runners, and the Be Active Expo at the Sanford Center. The race director is Phil Knutson. The medical director is Dr. Mark Carlson.

Live coverage of the race has been provided by local radio station KKBJ-FM, Mix 103.7.

The race is certified by the USATF, thus it is a Boston Marathon qualifier.

== Course ==
The race course is a loop, mostly flat with some hills and roughly 300 ft. total elevation gain. All of the route is on paved trails and roads. Runners cite the scenic nature of the course as a highlight of the race.

As of 2018, the course starts at the Sanford Center, the convention center and hockey arena, and then heads west before angling back toward the start for an eight-mile loop. The race continues on the shore of Lake Bemidji and follows the tree-lined Paul Bunyan State Trail over the Mississippi River before doubling back (for just a mile) after reaching Big Bass Lake. The route continues through the pines, poplar and spruce trees of Lake Bemidji State Park, back around the west side of panoramic Lake Bemidji, through the city's downtown, and past the Paul Bunyan and Babe the Blue Ox statues before returning to the Sanford Center.

The course is a certified marathon distance (USATF #MN18060RR).

== Race weekend ==
Several races take place as a part of the marathon weekend. The first day includes two kids races (a 1/2K and 1K), a 5K run and a 10K run. The marathon takes place on the second day along with a half marathon and a unique 26K (16.16-mile) race that circles Lake Bemidji. Throughout the weekend, the local arena hosts the Be Active Expo and (most years) the Bemidji State Beavers men's hockey team home games.

The marathon and half marathon races offer pacers.

== Prizes ==
Prizes for the marathon have included double-bit felling axes with engraved handles.

== History ==
Local runner Dennis Bartz spearheaded the idea to bring a marathon to Bemidji, a city of nearly 15,000 people. Bartz coached cross country and track for Bemidji High School, and in the 1970s, was captain of his Bemidji State Beavers track and cross country teams. He wrote "Run For Your Life ... The Marathon, Minnesota Style" in 2011. In 2012, Bartz worked with a team of co-directors, including Cris Bitker, Jill Bitker, Aaron Riedel, Mark Peske, to plan and launch the first marathon weekend in 2013.

2013

Marathon

The first Bemidji Blue Ox marathon took place Saturday, Oct. 12. The temperature was 54 degrees at the start and rose to 65 by noon while a strong wind carried in a light mist. Throughout the race, runners faced wet and chilly conditions. Still, the marathon race saw 184 runners finish from 23 U.S. states and two Canadian provinces, proving to race organizers that there was ample support for the event.

Gina Aalgaard Kelly led the women in the marathon and set a course record in 3:04:52 (which stood until 2024). It was another strong finish for the North Dakota State University alumnae and professor who was returning to her hometown. Earlier, in April, she took 2nd at the Run for the Lakes half marathon, and in June she had run sub-3:05 at Grandma's Marathon.

The men's winner, Pete Miller, was also a Bemidji High School and North Dakota State alumnus. Local spectators recalled Miller running for the Bemidji Lumberjacks at the 1987–1988 Minnesota State cross country and track championships. Miller churned through the course and crossed the finish line first with a time of 2:46:19. The course record would stand until 2017.

Half Marathon

The inaugural half marathon was run with the marathon; 388 runners competed to the finish line. Pam Olsen, who finished top-10 at the 2012 Fargo Marathon, won for women (1:32:27). Her time remained a course record for three years.

Kenny Miller, a teacher at Bertha-Hewitt High School and former Bemidji State University alumnus, won the overall race in 1:14:04. A week before, he had run a 54:33 at the TC 10 Mile to finish 12th. Miller was often a top-10 contender at the Garry Bjorklund Half Marathon in the 2000s, and in 2003 had run 1:10:22 for eighth place.

5K

The first 5K was run Friday, Oct. 11. In field of 206 runners, winners were 16-year-old Evan Byler (20:14) and Amy Thorson (24:14).

2020

The COVID-19 pandemic forced closures on nearly every marathon starting in mid-March, and while Grandma's Marathon and Twin Cities Marathon had cancelled two months in advance, smaller fall marathons in appeared as though they would take place. Med City Marathon pushed back its start from May to September. The Ely Marathon, scheduled for September, and the Mankato Marathon, scheduled for October, still planned to go on.

But one by one, each cancelled. By July 28, after Ely, Med City and Mankato marathons had fallen like dominos, race directors for Bemidji Blue Ox Marathon also cancelled their event, citing the state of Minnesota's policies regarding crowds. They announced that entry fees would not be refunded due to incurred costs. "The health and safety of our participants, volunteers, sponsors, spectators, and community remain our top priority," the race officials wrote in a press release.

In Minnesota, the Bemidji Blue Ox Marathon was the last scheduled marathon of 2020 to announce cancellation, which the race officials did on July 28. All races were announced to have virtual versions, but all in-person races were cancelled.

== Marathon results ==
Key: Course record

All cities in Minnesota unless indicated otherwise

	Men					Women					
Year	Place	Name	Age	Hometown	Time	Year	Place	Name	Age	Hometown	Time
2026	1st place, gold medalist(s)	Judah Sporre	28	Laporte	2:48:00	2026	1st place, gold medalist(s)	Leah Rabas	25	Green Bay, Wisconsin	2:59:55
2026	2nd place, silver medalist(s)	Scott Kvidera	30	Grand Forks, North Dakota	2:50:47	2026	2nd place, silver medalist(s)	Ellyssa Peterson	28	Nashwauk	3:08:32
2026	3rd place, bronze medalist(s)	Andrew Bostrom	31	Richfield	2:55:58	2026	3rd place, bronze medalist(s)	Rebekah Mayer	45	Eden Prairie	3:22:44
2025	1st place, gold medalist(s)	Brett Kurschner	21	Bemidji	2:38:25	2025	1st place, gold medalist(s)	Ellyssa Peterson	27	Nashwauk	3:05:36
2025	2nd place, silver medalist(s)	Noah Schlee	31	Richfield	2:40:37	2025	2nd place, silver medalist(s)	Mary Larue	45	Willmar	3:28:08
2025	3rd place, bronze medalist(s)	Michael Cooper	27	Winnipeg, Manitoba	2:52:13	2025	3rd place, bronze medalist(s)	Caitlin Cavanaugh	35	Bemidji	3:32:47
2024	1st place, gold medalist(s)	Benjamin Drexler	36	Minneapolis	2:38:22	2024	1st place, gold medalist(s)	Ellyssa Peterson	26	Nashwauk	2:54:31
2024	2nd place, silver medalist(s)	Carlos Batista de Olive	44	Bloomington	2:41:10	2024	2nd place, silver medalist(s)	Serena Sullivan	43	Hibbing	3:04:03
2024	3rd place, bronze medalist(s)	Sam Hodgson	24	Mankato	2:53:23	2024	3rd place, bronze medalist(s)	Madelyn Stone	23	Bemidji	3:28:51
2023	1st place, gold medalist(s)	Jesse Prince	42	Bemidji	2:38:28	2023	1st place, gold medalist(s)	Amy Will	36	Warren	2:57:06
2023	2nd place, silver medalist(s)	Benjamin Drexler	35	Minneapolis	2:45:28	2023	2nd place, silver medalist(s)	Molly Mccabe	32	St. Louis Park	3:01:14
2023	3rd place, bronze medalist(s)	Dave Haglin	42	Duluth	2:53:23	2023	3rd place, bronze medalist(s)	Sydney Patterson	26	Baxter	3:11:47
2022	1st place, gold medalist(s)	Jesse Prince	41	Bemidji	2:37:30	2022	1st place, gold medalist(s)	Natalie Timmers	40	Nelson	3:29:23
2022	2nd place, silver medalist(s)	Andrew Richardson	33	Wyoming, Minnesota	2:58:14	2022	2nd place, silver medalist(s)	Jill Marble	51	Prior Lake	3:36:04
2022	3rd place, bronze medalist(s)	Jacob Roberts	36	Ham Lake	2:58:26	2022	3rd place, bronze medalist(s)	Nicole Gunderson	37	Baxter	3:41:00
2021	1st place, gold medalist(s)	Anthony Fagundes	31	Fair Oaks, California	2:44:44	2021	1st place, gold medalist(s)	Amanda Blair	31	Grand Forks, North Dakota	3:02:14
2021	2nd place, silver medalist(s)	Brandon Lee	40	West Fargo, North Dakota	3:04:29	2021	2nd place, silver medalist(s)	Amy Will	34	Warren	3:10:55
2021	3rd place, bronze medalist(s)	Dave Haglin	40	Duluth	3:07:32	2021	3rd place, bronze medalist(s)	Amanda Reynolds	36	Pineville, North Carolina	3:21:37
2020		Race cancelled due to COVID-19 pandemic*				2020		Race cancelled due to COVID-19 pandemic*			
2019	1st place, gold medalist(s)	Jesse Prince	38	Bemidji	2:35:32	2019	1st place, gold medalist(s)	Amy Will	32	Warren	3:22:40
2019	2nd place, silver medalist(s)	Ricky Aulie	35	Breezy Point	2:56:58	2019	2nd place, silver medalist(s)	Dexi Maxa	34	Bigfork	3:26:20
2019	3rd place, bronze medalist(s)	John Naegeli	35	Bemidji	3:04:56	2019	3rd place, bronze medalist(s)	Kelli Holmstrom	35	Roseville	3:33:46
2018	1st place, gold medalist(s)	Brock Tesdahl	25	Hopkins	2:36:35	2018	1st place, gold medalist(s)	Stacie Noha	32	Isle	3:21:52
2018	2nd place, silver medalist(s)	Christopher Frank	46	Winnipeg, Manitoba	2:55:49	2018	2nd place, silver medalist(s)	Stephanie Dreis	29	Maple Grove	3:31:57
2018	3rd place, bronze medalist(s)	Taylor Johnson	28	Sauk Rapids	3:04:41	2018	3rd place, bronze medalist(s)	Karen Kleind Ronning	43	Excelsior	3:32:58
2017	1st place, gold medalist(s)	Brock Tesdahl	24	Hopkins	2:37:31	2017	1st place, gold medalist(s)	Annalise O'Toole	26	Long Beach, California	3:19:04
2017	2nd place, silver medalist(s)	Jesse Prince	36	Bemidji	2:44:44	2017	2nd place, silver medalist(s)	Lisa Nordvik	26	St. Cloud	3:28:50
2017	3rd place, bronze medalist(s)	Sam Dwyer	24	Bemidji	3:24:01	2017	3rd place, bronze medalist(s)	Bonnie Fines	45	St. Cloud	3:33:41
2016	1st place, gold medalist(s)	James Straubel	26	Bemidji	2:54:58	2016	1st place, gold medalist(s)	Amy Will	29	Stephen	3:25:36
2016	2nd place, silver medalist(s)	Bryan Larison	33	Minneapolis	2:55:04	2016	2nd place, silver medalist(s)	Carrie Miller	33	Minneapolis	3:32:29
2016	3rd place, bronze medalist(s)	Ricky Aulie	32	Breezy Point	3:03:21	2016	3rd place, bronze medalist(s)	Jess Gowan	26	Manvel, North Dakota	3:32:47
2015	1st place, gold medalist(s)	Brock Tesdahl	22	Crosby	2:52:30	2015	1st place, gold medalist(s)	Sarah Kemp	32	Sauk Rapids	3:25:00
2015	2nd place, silver medalist(s)	Ben Bruce	32	Waubun	2:54:09	2015	2nd place, silver medalist(s)	Melanie Hevel-Olson	34	Bemidji	3:35:35
2015	3rd place, bronze medalist(s)	Benjamin Nelson	19	Grand Forks, North Dakota	3:04:39	2015	3rd place, bronze medalist(s)	Melanie Lund	33	Roseville	3:39:07
2014	1st place, gold medalist(s)	Tom Ritchie	40	Anchorage, Alaska	2:36:47	2014	1st place, gold medalist(s)	Sarah Kemp	31	Sauk Rapids	3:15:30
2014	2nd place, silver medalist(s)	Ben Bruce	31	Waubun	2:50:44	2014	2nd place, silver medalist(s)	Andrea Nelson	41	Bemidji	3:21:17
2014	3rd place, bronze medalist(s)	James Manecke	42	Lengby	3:08:16	2014	3rd place, bronze medalist(s)	Cosette Mari Taylor	40	Winnipeg, Manitoba	3:25:47
2013	1st place, gold medalist(s)	Pete Miller	44	Shorewood	2:46:20	2013	1st place, gold medalist(s)	Gina Aalgaard Kelly	37	Lisbon, North Dakota	3:04:52
2013	2nd place, silver medalist(s)	Cley Twigg	38	Moorhead	2:51:07	2013	2nd place, silver medalist(s)	Jessica Lovering	25	Eden Prairie	3:07:31
2013	3rd place, bronze medalist(s)	Robert Preston	44	Athens, Tennessee	2:55:37	2013	3rd place, bronze medalist(s)	Andrea Nelson	40	Bemidji	3:24:27

== 26K Lake Loop results ==
Key: Course record

All cities in Minnesota unless indicated otherwise

	Men					Women					
Year	Place	Name	Age	Hometown	Time	Year	Place	Name	Age	Hometown	Time
2026	1st place, gold medalist(s)	Andrew Blair	39	Grand Rapids	1:53:21	2026	1st place, gold medalist(s)	Chelsey Gloude	38	Warren	2:00:51
2026	2nd place, silver medalist(s)	Mike Fitzlaff	42	Bertha	1:53:48	2026	2nd place, silver medalist(s)	Annaliese Youngs	26	Minneapolis	2:01:06
2026	3rd place, bronze medalist(s)	Erik Wheeler	47	Rice	1:55:35	2026	3rd place, bronze medalist(s)	Brianna Bischof	40	Fergus Falls	2:02:32
2025	1st place, gold medalist(s)	Ruairi Moynihan	36	Fargo, North Dakota	1:41:43	2025	1st place, gold medalist(s)	Autumn Huju	29	Minneapolis	1:58:00
2025	2nd place, silver medalist(s)	Braxton Middaugh	21	Fargo, North Dakota	1:43:46	2025	2nd place, silver medalist(s)	Mary Wood	28	Grimes, Iowa	2:02:13
2025	3rd place, bronze medalist(s)	Taylor Boysen	27	Grimes, Iowa	1:46:06	2025	3rd place, bronze medalist(s)	Tyla Wilson	48	Jamestown, North Dakota	2:08:23
2024	1st place, gold medalist(s)	Jesse Prince	43	Bemidji	1:40:02	2024	1st place, gold medalist(s)	Dawn Fairchild	48	Grand Rapids	2:05:36
2024	2nd place, silver medalist(s)	Keith Virden	51	Springfield, IL	1:44:28	2024	2nd place, silver medalist(s)	Kerrie Berg	45	Bemidji	2:06:11
2024	3rd place, bronze medalist(s)	Seth Dallman	35	Grand Forks, ND	1:51:00	2024	3rd place, bronze medalist(s)	Chantal Givens	46	Winnipeg, Manitoba	2:10:33
2023	1st place, gold medalist(s)	Carlos Eduar Batista de Olive	43	Bloomington	1:36:58	2023	1st place, gold medalist(s)	Chelsey Gloude	35	Warren	2:00:39
2023	2nd place, silver medalist(s)	Charles Beiberg	31	Tenstrike	1:49:07	2023	2nd place, silver medalist(s)	Lynn Astrop	27	Edina	2:04:16
2023	3rd place, bronze medalist(s)	Isaac Pearson	22	Duluth	2:01:24	2023	3rd place, bronze medalist(s)	Chantal Givens	45	Winnipeg, Manitoba	2:05:16
2022	1st place, gold medalist(s)	Benjamin Drexler	34	Minneapolis	1:35:55	2022	1st place, gold medalist(s)	Amy Will	35	Warren	1:48:13
2022	2nd place, silver medalist(s)	Ryan Rogers	43	Bemidji	1:50:08	2022	2nd place, silver medalist(s)	Lindsay George	38	Thompson, North Dakota	2:05:40
2022	3rd place, bronze medalist(s)	Dustin Jarshaw	40	Newfolden	2:00:16	2022	3rd place, bronze medalist(s)	Julie Helsene	37	Brainerd	2:08:14
2021	1st place, gold medalist(s)	Kevin Robertson	33	Brainerd	2:20:31	2021	1st place, gold medalist(s)	Lindsay George	37	Thompson, North Dakota	2:03:39
2021	2nd place, silver medalist(s)	Cullen Reiser	28	Mound	2:21:59	2021	2nd place, silver medalist(s)	Amber Kantonen	45	Mahtowa	2:14:13
2021	3rd place, bronze medalist(s)	Mike Porter	56	Brainerd	2:22:14	2021	3rd place, bronze medalist(s)	Sr. Melissa Cote	43	Bismarck, North Dakota	2:14:25
2020		Race cancelled due to COVID-19 pandemic*				2020		Race cancelled due to COVID-19 pandemic*			
2019	1st place, gold medalist(s)	Matthew Arbegast	20	Grand Forks, North Dakota	1:45:04	2019	1st place, gold medalist(s)	Casey Hovland	23	North Branch	1:45:32
2019	2nd place, silver medalist(s)	Ryley Emslander	18	Sartell	1:59:13	2019	2nd place, silver medalist(s)	Jane Maus	24	Salt Lake City, Utah	2:03:19
2019	3rd place, bronze medalist(s)	Erik Wheeler	40	Rice	1:59:58	2019	3rd place, bronze medalist(s)	Brittany Hesse	28	Thief River Falls	2:10:04
2018	1st place, gold medalist(s)	Michael Mettler	25	New York Mills	1:48:48	2018	1st place, gold medalist(s)	Mandy Elseth	36	Fargo, North Dakota	2:01:14
2018	2nd place, silver medalist(s)	Norris Chin	26	Grand Forks, North Dakota	2:01:01	2018	2nd place, silver medalist(s)	Hanna Fylpaa	30	Juneau, Alaska	2:10:29
2018	3rd place, bronze medalist(s)	Lawrence Mettler	18	Burtrum	2:01:43	2018	3rd place, bronze medalist(s)	Lisa Becker	33	Minneota	2:11:04
2017	1st place, gold medalist(s)	Brooks Grossinger	40	Mayer	1:42:48	2017	1st place, gold medalist(s)	Denise Kaelberer	46	Bismarck, North Dakota	1:58:04
2017	2nd place, silver medalist(s)	Charles Biberg	25	Tenstrike	1:45:31	2017	2nd place, silver medalist(s)	Katie Durrant	43	Bemidji	1:59:53
2017	3rd place, bronze medalist(s)	Erik Pieh	34	St. Paul	1:56:26	2017	3rd place, bronze medalist(s)	Jessica Lovering	29	Eden Prairie	2:07:24
2016	1st place, gold medalist(s)	Sam Dwyer	23	Bemidji	1:43:05	2016	1st place, gold medalist(s)	Jessica Lovering	28	Eden Prairie	1:55:09
2016	2nd place, silver medalist(s)	Brooks Grossinger	39	Mayer	1:43:13	2016	2nd place, silver medalist(s)	Mandy Elseth	34	Fargo, North Dakota	1:56:54
2016	3rd place, bronze medalist(s)	Ben Kirmse	33	Somerset, Wisconsin	1:45:01	2016	3rd place, bronze medalist(s)	Kari Brown	39	Garfield	2:08:59
2015	1st place, gold medalist(s)	Brooks Grossinger	38	Mayer	1:41:40	2015	1st place, gold medalist(s)	Lisa Dunnigan	33	Moorhead	1:58:38
2015	2nd place, silver medalist(s)	Sam Dwyer	22	Bemidji	1:55:03	2015	2nd place, silver medalist(s)	Andrea Nelson	42	Bemidji	2:02:32
2015	3rd place, bronze medalist(s)	Richard Thompson	49	Peoria, Illinois	2:06:30	2015	3rd place, bronze medalist(s)	Danielle Gronhovd	20	Duluth	2:09:52
2014	1st place, gold medalist(s)	Chris Bowman	24	Minneapolis	1:51:31	2014	1st place, gold medalist(s)	Andrea Kennedy	34	Winnipeg, Canada	2:07:44
2014	2nd place, silver medalist(s)	William Sackett	26	Grand Rapids	1:55:16	2014	2nd place, silver medalist(s)	Jill Anderson	40	Bemidji	2:07:56
2014	3rd place, bronze medalist(s)	Syl Lemelin	46	Winnipeg, Canada	1:59:24	2014	3rd place, bronze medalist(s)	Kristin Rognerud	33	Duluth	2:08:46

== Half marathon results ==
Key: Course record

All cities in Minnesota unless indicated otherwise

	Men					Women					
Year	Place	Name	Age	Hometown	Time	Year	Place	Name	Age	Hometown	Time
2026	1st place, gold medalist(s)	Garrett Kracht	23	Warroad	1:23:48	2026	1st place, gold medalist(s)	Kristen McMoil	34	Shoreview	1:34:59
2026	2nd place, silver medalist(s)	Jonathan Green	55	Grand Forks, North Dakota	1:24:45	2026	2nd place, silver medalist(s)	Brenna Wilson	24	Bemidji	1:36:16
2026	3rd place, bronze medalist(s)	Justin Eidet	40	West Fargo, North Dakota	1:28:18	2026	3rd place, bronze medalist(s)	Emily Warner	33	Staples	1:41:56
2025	1st place, gold medalist(s)	Christian Kamrowski	22	Winona	1:24:47	2025	1st place, gold medalist(s)	Beth Claybaugh	34	Farmington	1:28:41
2025	2nd place, silver medalist(s)	Marcus Langley	30	St. Cloud	1:25:11	2025	2nd place, silver medalist(s)	Piper Simpson	30	Gilby, North Dakota	1:31:34
2025	3rd place, bronze medalist(s)	Ryley Emslander	24	Sartell	1:25:55	2025	3rd place, bronze medalist(s)	Brenna Anderson	23	Ellendale, North Dakota	1:35:26
2024	1st place, gold medalist(s)	John Borrego	46	El Paso, Texas	1:24:46	2024	1st place, gold medalist(s)	Amanda Blair	34	Grand Rapids	1:25:07
2024	2nd place, silver medalist(s)	Andrew Lachowitzer	36	Park Rapids	1:26:50	2024	2nd place, silver medalist(s)	Logan Jackson	30	St. Paul	1:30:24
2024	3rd place, bronze medalist(s)	Kenny May	38	Park Rapids	1:30:11	2024	3rd place, bronze medalist(s)	Caitlin Cavanaugh	34	Bemidji	1:33:55
2023	1st place, gold medalist(s)	Daniel Peterson	27	Cold Spring	1:13:06	2023	1st place, gold medalist(s)	Gabriele Beniak	30	Alexandria	1:24:41
2023	2nd place, silver medalist(s)	Daniel Tesarek	32	Omaha, Nebraska	1:30:50	2023	2nd place, silver medalist(s)	Lexi Erickson	24	International Falls	1:31:06
2023	3rd place, bronze medalist(s)	Josh Schaffer	29	Minneapolis	1:34:03	2023	3rd place, bronze medalist(s)	Caitlin Cavanaugh	33	Bemidji	1:36:04
2022	1st place, gold medalist(s)	Isaac Threinen	20	Kasson	1:15:06	2022	1st place, gold medalist(s)	Amanda Blair	32	Grand Forks, North Dakota	1:21:39
2022	2nd place, silver medalist(s)	Eddie Carlson	24	Bemidji	1:21:29	2022	2nd place, silver medalist(s)	Mary Wood	25	West Des Moines, Iowa	1:31:05
2022	3rd place, bronze medalist(s)	Jeffrey Cottrell	30	Duluth	1:31:45	2022	3rd place, bronze medalist(s)	Angela Corcoran	24	Plainfield, Illinois	1:36:46
2021	1st place, gold medalist(s)	Michael Bourland	27	St. Paul	1:19:02	2021	1st place, gold medalist(s)	Julie Helsene	36	Brainerd	1:39:15
2021	2nd place, silver medalist(s)	Ben Jacobs	31	Minnetonka	1:24:13	2021	2nd place, silver medalist(s)	Melanie Priebe	38	Park Rapids	1:41:01
2021	3rd place, bronze medalist(s)	Nicholas Youso	18	Bemidji	1:31:45	2021	3rd place, bronze medalist(s)	Mary Wood	24	West Des Moines, Iowa	1:43:59
2020		Race cancelled due to COVID-19 pandemic*				2020		Race cancelled due to COVID-19 pandemic*			
2019	1st place, gold medalist(s)	Landon Bruggeman	22	Brainerd	1:23:34	2019	1st place, gold medalist(s)	Danielle Bartz	33	Bemidji	1:32:32
2019	2nd place, silver medalist(s)	Kenny Gudmundson	21	Eau Claire, Wisconsin	1:25:09	2019	2nd place, silver medalist(s)	Jessie Maher	35	Bemidji	1:36:16
2019	3rd place, bronze medalist(s)	David Lewis	45	Nevis	1:27:49	2019	3rd place, bronze medalist(s)	Alyssa Robley	26	Nevis	1:39:52
2018	1st place, gold medalist(s)	Kenny Miller	41	Wadena	1:16:42	2018	1st place, gold medalist(s)	Alyssa Breu	29	St. Paul	1:28:05
2018	2nd place, silver medalist(s)	Nick Wagner	25	Eau Claire, Wisconsin	1:21:09	2018	2nd place, silver medalist(s)	Logan Opsahl	24	Forest Lake	1:32:33
2018	3rd place, bronze medalist(s)	Dominic Smith	19	Santa Fe, New Mexico	1:33:20	2018	3rd place, bronze medalist(s)	Ellen Frondorf	33	Cincinnati, Ohio	1:33:31
2017	1st place, gold medalist(s)	Andrew Zachman	20	Holdingford	1:10:34	2017	1st place, gold medalist(s)	Andrea Nelson	44	Bemidji	1:31:39
2017	2nd place, silver medalist(s)	Paul Nordquist	23	Minneapolis	1:11:29	2017	2nd place, silver medalist(s)	Amber McNallan	22	Bemidji	1:39:38
2017	3rd place, bronze medalist(s)	Matthew Scherber	26	Minneapolis	1:11:36	2017	3rd place, bronze medalist(s)	Mairead Drain	39	Winnipeg, Canada	1:41:05
2016	1st place, gold medalist(s)	Kyle Downs	31	Bismarck, North Dakota	1:11:45	2016	1st place, gold medalist(s)	Andrea Nelson	43	Bemidji	1:31:49
2016	2nd place, silver medalist(s)	Kenny Miller	39	Wadena	1:14:44	2016	2nd place, silver medalist(s)	Logan Opsahl	22	Forest Lake	1:32:02
2016	3rd place, bronze medalist(s)	Ryan Ness	24	Woodbury	1:25:26	2016	3rd place, bronze medalist(s)	Lindsey Green	32	Winnipeg, Canada	1:33:59
2015	1st place, gold medalist(s)	Kenny Miller	38	Wadena	1:14:17	2015	1st place, gold medalist(s)	Kayla Gaulke	27	New Richmond, Wisconsin	1:33:57
2015	2nd place, silver medalist(s)	Christopher Hagen	39	Little Falls	1:25:16	2015	2nd place, silver medalist(s)	Jessica Lovering	27	Eden Prairie	1:35:26
2015	3rd place, bronze medalist(s)	Elias Hendrickson	21	Bemidji	1:25:48	2015	3rd place, bronze medalist(s)	Leah Holt	46	Minneapolis	1:37:45
2014	1st place, gold medalist(s)	Kenny Miller	37	Wadena	1:15:03	2014	1st place, gold medalist(s)	Pam Olsen	41	Hendricks	1:33:43
2014	2nd place, silver medalist(s)	David Lewis	40	Nevis	1:20:23	2014	2nd place, silver medalist(s)	Casey Mork	31	Becker	1:36:30
2014	3rd place, bronze medalist(s)	Tyler Lange	25	Bemidji	1:28:43	2014	3rd place, bronze medalist(s)	Jasmine Carlson	29	Solway	1:38:05
2013	1st place, gold medalist(s)	Kenny Miller	36	Wadena	1:14:04	2013	1st place, gold medalist(s)	Pam Olsen	40	Hendricks	1:32:27
2013	2nd place, silver medalist(s)	Andrew Papke-Larson	23	Bemidji	1:14:58	2013	2nd place, silver medalist(s)	Michelle Swenson	44	Kansas City, Missouri	1:32:46
2013	3rd place, bronze medalist(s)	Brian Zalewski	33	Muskego, Wisconsin	1:17:23	2013	3rd place, bronze medalist(s)	Christel Kippenhan	48	Bemidji	1:39:04

* A "virtual" race was scheduled.
