= Fabian Fournier =

Canadian–American lumberjack

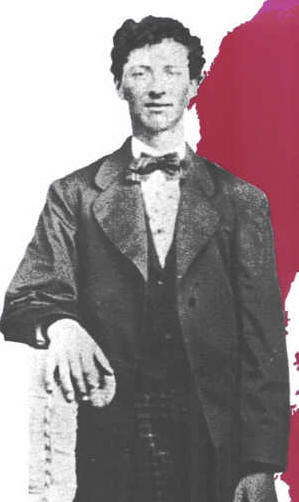
- Fournier in 1865
- Born: c. 1840s Quebec, Canada
- Died: c. 1875; Bay City, Michigan
- Other names: Saginaw Joe
- Occupation: Lumberjack
- Years active: 1865–1875
- Known for: Unusual jawbone and possible inspiration for Paul Bunyan

Fabian "Joe" Fournier was a lumberjack, born in Lower Canada (now Quebec) , who would later emigrate to the United States of America and work as a lumberjack in Michigan. He has often been said to be the man who inspired Paul Bunyan in at least some part.

== Life and career ==
According to historian D. Lawrence Rogers, Fournier was an infamous brawler. An early reference to his life by Stewart H. Holbrook describes a legendary battle between him and 'Silver Jack Driscoll', noting Fournier's signature move as the headbutt. Fournier was said to be 6 feet or taller, putting him far above the average height of his day and was noted for his strength.

== Death and legacy ==
Fournier was killed in either November 1875 or the summer of 1876, allegedly by Adolphus "Blinky" Robertson, a stone mason who struck him in the head with his mallet on a dock in Bay City, Michigan.

The lumberjack became somewhat of a folk hero in his own right after his death, known for his love of fighting and his supposed double row of teeth. Another moment Fournier was often mythologized for was biting out a 'chunk out of a wooden bar' with his double row teeth.

In a collection of Paul Bunyan stories by Harold Felton, Fournier is present as a distinct figure in a recount of the Round River story.

Fournier's remains were allegedly hosted at the University of Michigan at some point, where he became an oddity in dental sciences.

Fournier's status as the man who inspired Paul Bunyan was challenged by Michael Edmunds in his 2009 book, Out of the Northwoods: The Many Lives of Paul Bunyan, stating that Bunyan stories were likely already circulating by the time Fournier became known among lumberjacks.
