= Paul Bunyan State Trail =

Rail trail in Minnesota, United States

Coordinates: 46°59′55″N 94°31′49″W

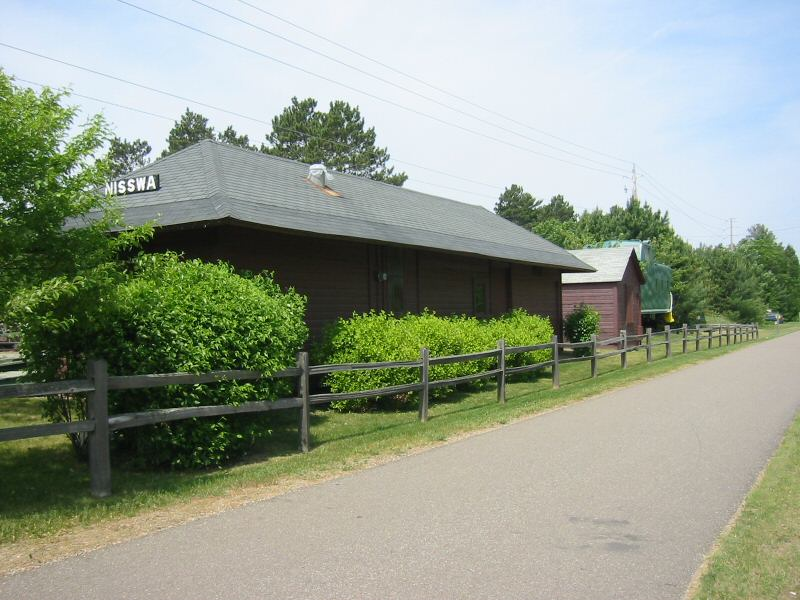
- A former Northern Pacific Railway depot in Nisswa, now a historical museum beside the Paul Bunyan State Trail
- Length: 112 mi (180 km)
- Location: Central Minnesota, USA
- Designation: Minnesota state trail
- Trailheads: Crow Wing State Park; Lake Bemidji State Park
- Use: Biking, hiking, in-line skating, mountain biking, snowmobiling
- Season: Year-round
- Sights: Leech Lake, Lake Bemidji
- Hazards: Severe weather
- Surface: Asphalt
- Website: Paul Bunyan State Trail

The Paul Bunyan State Trail is a multi-use recreational rail trail in north-central Minnesota, United States, running between the cities of Baxter/Brainerd and Bemidji. It is named after the giant lumberjack Paul Bunyan of American folklore.

The route was part of the Burlington Northern Railroad lines abandoned in 1983. The trail covers a distance of 120 miles (190 km). The southern extension, completed in 2012, moved the southern terminus to Crow Wing State Park. The route through Bemidji follows city streets until an off-road path can be secured. The Paul Bunyan State Trail intersects with the Heartland State Trail in Walker and in Bemidji joins the Blue Ox Trail, which continues 110 miles (180 km) to the Canada–United States border.

As of 2013, the Bemidji Blue Ox Marathon runs on the portion of the trail along Lake Bemidji to Lake Bemidji State Park.
