= Paul Bunyan and Babe the Blue Ox =

- U.S. National Register of Historic Places
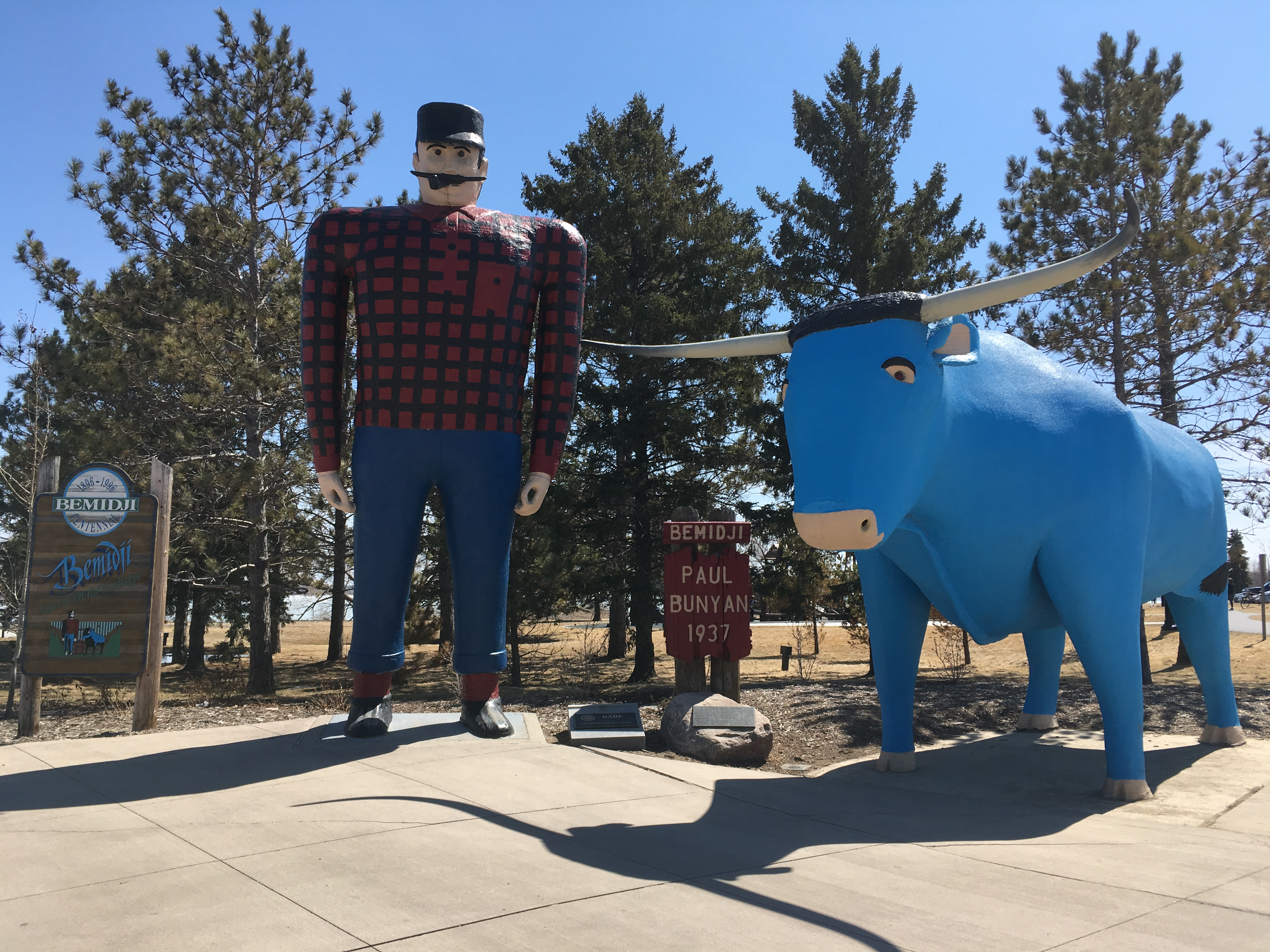
- Statues such as these served to attract passers-by in automobiles as cars gained popularity through the 1920s and 1930s.

- Location within Minnesota Location within the United States
- Location: Third St. and Bemidji Ave. Bemidji, Beltrami County, Minnesota
- Coordinates: 47°28′13.6″N 94°52′44.1″W
- Area: less than one acre
- Built: 1937
- Architect: Cyril M. Dickinson; Jim Payton
- NRHP reference No.: 88000204
- Added to NRHP: March 10, 1988

Paul Bunyan and Babe the Blue Ox are the names of a pair of large statues of the American folk hero Paul Bunyan and his ox, located in Bemidji, Minnesota. This roadside attraction has been listed on the National Register of Historic Places since 1988.

Built in 1937 to attract attention of passing motorists, these are similar to such structures as the Benewah Milk Bottle, the Teapot Dome Service Station, or the comparably colossal Dinosaur Park sculptures in South Dakota. These were all built in a period of time when automobile travel became increasingly affordable and common.

This pair of statues are said by the Kodak Company to be the "second most photographed statues in the United States", behind Mount Rushmore in South Dakota.

== History ==
The city of Bemidji is located in a vast woodland and lake region. As early as the 1890s, the town enjoyed a modest tourist trade. When rail connections were constructed to Bemidji in 1898, promoters began the development of lakeshore sites for cottages, hotels, and resorts. Most of these resorts catered to hunters and anglers. In the 1920s, the rise in automobile usage and affordability contributed to a significant boom in Bemidji's tourist industry, but it suffered during the Great Depression.

As a means of stimulating tourism in Bemidji, a number of local, civic organizations sponsored a winter carnival meant to promote the city's resources for winter sports. Due to Bemidji's once prominent status as a logging and lumbering center, the celebrations focused on Paul Bunyan, the larger-than life lumberjack who is an American folk hero.

On January 14, 1937, the carnival opened with Earl L. Grinols, Sr., elected as the carnival king. Two giant statues were unveiled at the event: one of Bunyan and the other of his giant blue ox, Babe; the pair were to serve as carnival mascots. Babe was brought into town on a Grinols Implement & Fuel Co. truck arranged so that its exhaust exited through Babe's nostrils. The statues were designed by Lennord L. Pitney of Park Rapids, Minnesota. Paul was built by Carl Aldal (1897–1966), a local cement man. Babe was built by N. Edward Johnson (1902 - 1999) who owned the Bemidji Boat Factory.

In March 2006, the Rotary Club of Bemidji raised $53,000; along with a $68,000 federal grant, the club undertook to repair some damage to the statues. The money was also allocated for use in maintenance, with the majority slated for stabilizing the ground beneath the statues, to lessen shifting in freezing temperatures. The work included repairing a 1-inch-wide (25 mm) crack in Babe from the neck to the hindquarters; this had continued to widen despite yearly fixes by the city with caulk and blue paint.

In October 2013, local organizers ran the first Bemidji Blue Ox Marathon and planned the course to run past the statues.

== Dimensions ==
Paul Bunyan is approximately 18 feet (5.5 m) tall and measures 5 feet (1.5 m) across at his base. From toe to heel, Paul Bunyan measures 3 feet (0.91 m). Babe the Blue Ox is about 10 feet (3 m) tall and 8 feet (2.4 m) across at the front hooves. From nose to tail, Babe measures about 23 feet (7.0 m).

== In popular culture ==
- The statues are featured on a postcard during the opening sequence of the 1983 film National Lampoon's Vacation.
- The 8th track from the 2012 album Danza IIII: The Alpha – The Omega of American mathcore band The Tony Danza Tapdance Extravaganza is titled "Paul Bunyan and the Blue Ox".
- The statues are featured in the 2014 film Kumiko, the Treasure Hunter.
- The statues are featured in the first season of the FX series Fargo. While mainly shown throughout the season on Bemidji's fictional welcome sign, in the 2014 episode "A Fox, a Rabbit, and a Cabbage" the statues are depicted as smaller, life-size statues standing upon tall pedestals near railroad tracks and not Lake Bemidji.
