= Fort Ripley Township, Crow Wing County, Minnesota =

Township in Minnesota, United States

Fort Ripley Township
- Township
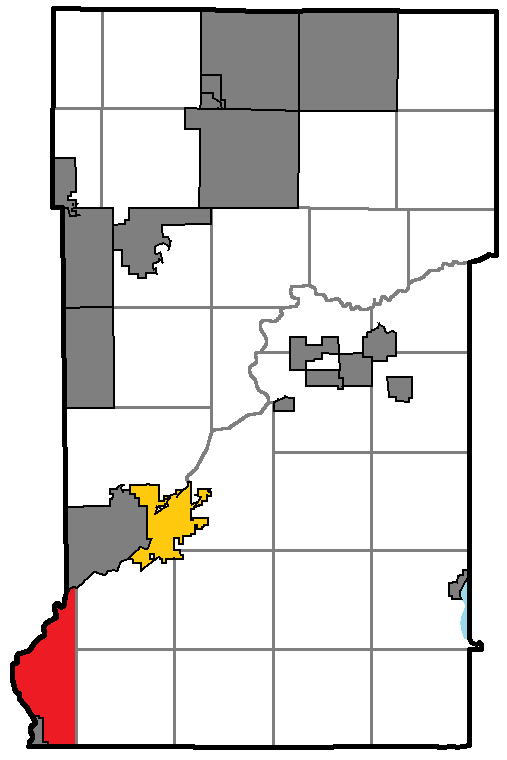
- Location of Fort Ripley Township, within Crow Wing County, Minnesota
- Coordinates: 46°12′30″N 94°21′1″W
- Country: United States
- State: Minnesota
- County: Crow Wing

Area
  - Total: 23.9 sq mi (61.8 km^{2})
  - Land: 22.2 sq mi (57.4 km^{2})
  - Water: 1.7 sq mi (4.4 km^{2})
- Elevation: 1,171 ft (357 m)

Population (2020)
  - Total: 1,009
  - Density: 45.5/sq mi (17.6/km^{2})
- Time zone: UTC-6 (Central (CST))
  - Summer (DST): UTC-5 (CDT)
- ZIP code: 56449
- Area code: 218
- FIPS code: 27-21950
- GNIS feature ID: 0664201

Fort Ripley Township is a township in Crow Wing County, Minnesota, United States. The population was 1,009 at the 2020 census.

== Geography ==
According to the United States Census Bureau, the township has a total area of 23.9 square miles (62 km^{2}), of which 22.2 square miles (57 km^{2}) is land and 1.7 square miles (4.4 km^{2}) (7.20%) is water.

The city of Fort Ripley is located within Fort Ripley Township geographically, but is a separate entity.

== Demographics ==
As of the census of 2000, there were 600 people, 240 households, and 177 families residing in the township. The population density was 27.1 inhabitants per square mile (10.5/km^{2}). There were 374 housing units at an average density of 16.9 per square mile (6.5/km^{2}). The racial makeup of the township was 99.00% White, 0.17% Native American, 0.17% Asian, and 0.67% from two or more races.

There were 240 households, out of which 30.0% had children under the age of 18 living with them, 66.3% were married couples living together, 2.9% had a female householder with no husband present, and 26.3% were non-families. 23.8% of all households were made up of individuals, and 10.4% had someone living alone who was 65 years of age or older. The average household size was 2.50 and the average family size was 2.93.

In the township the population was spread out, with 22.2% under the age of 18, 7.0% from 18 to 24, 26.3% from 25 to 44, 25.3% from 45 to 64, and 19.2% who were 65 years of age or older. The median age was 41 years. For every 100 females, there were 104.8 males. For every 100 females age 18 and over, there were 105.7 males.

The median income for a household in the township was $35,500, and the median income for a family was $42,125. Males had a median income of $31,719 versus $26,094 for females. The per capita income for the township was $16,076. About 4.3% of families and 6.1% of the population were below the poverty line, including 9.0% of those under age 18 and 1.8% of those age 65 or over.
