= Lake Bemidji State Park =

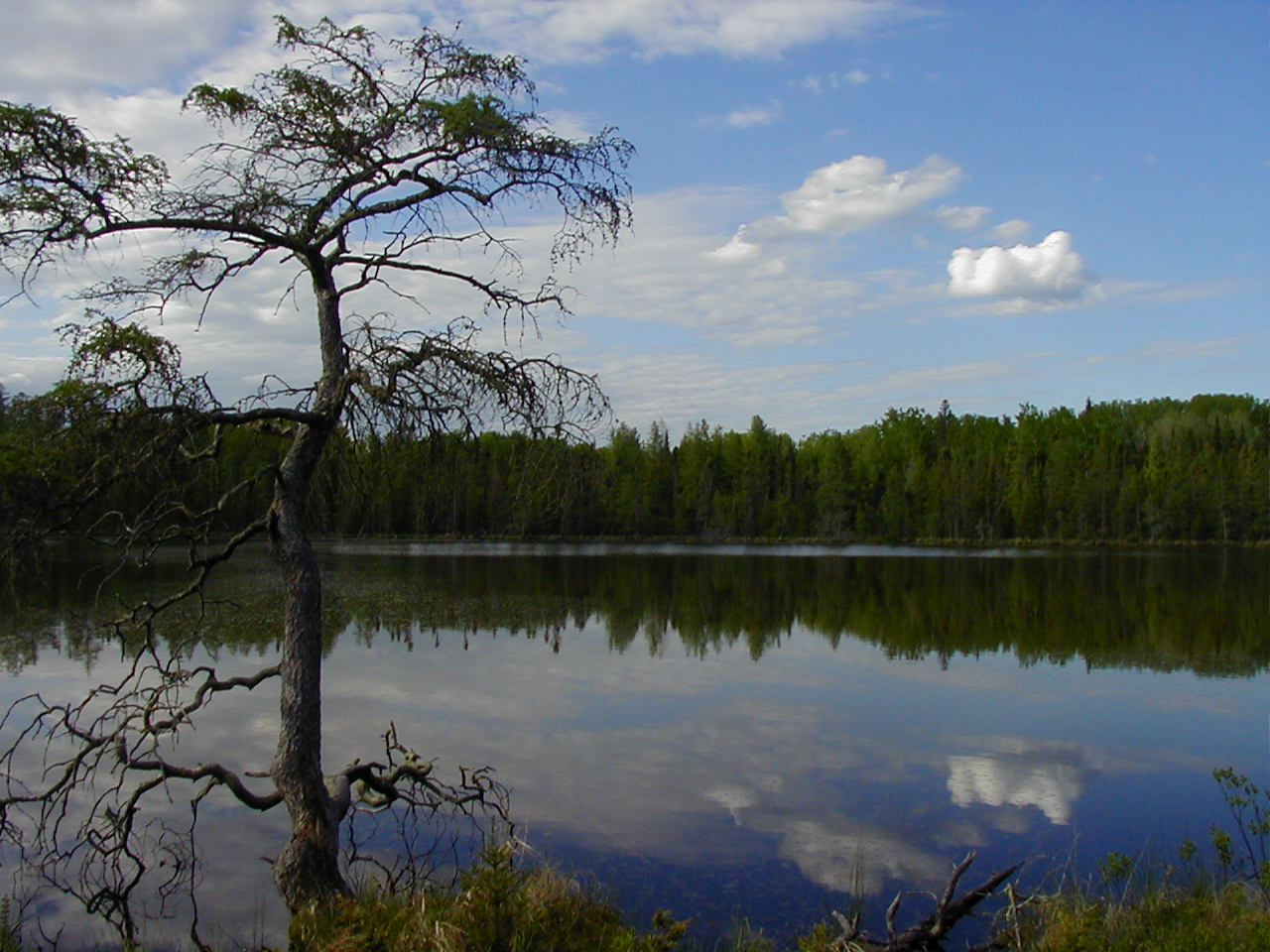
- An open-water bog in the north half of Lake Bemidji State Park

- Location within Minnesota Location within the United States
- Location: Beltrami, Minnesota, United States
- Coordinates: 47°32′24″N 94°49′10″W
- Area: 1,654 acres (6.69 km^{2})
- Elevation: 1,348 ft (411 m)
- Established: 1923
- Named for: Lake Bemidji
- Governing body: Minnesota Department of Natural Resources

- Lake Bemidji State Park CCC/NYA/Rustic Style Historic Resources
- U.S. National Register of Historic Places
- U.S. Historic district
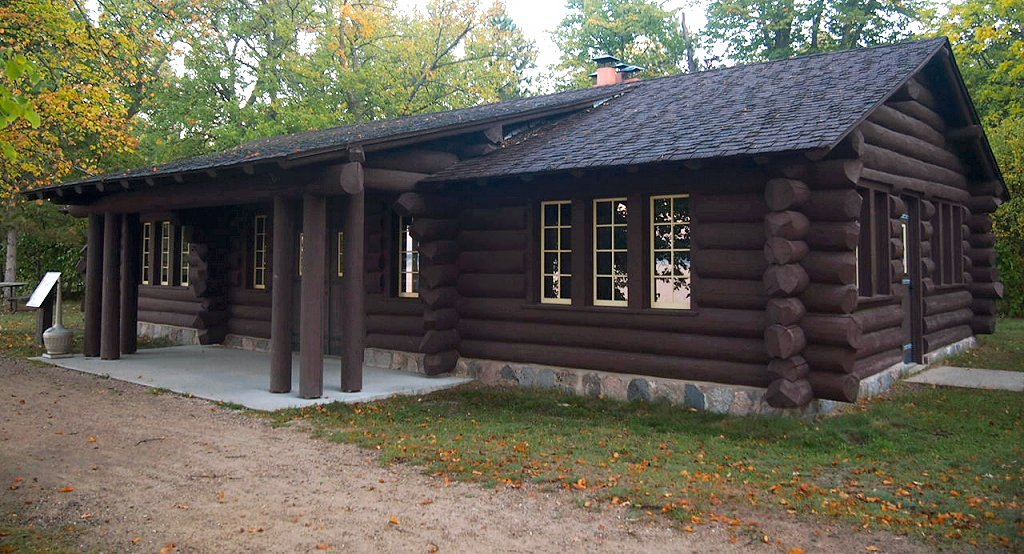
- The Shelter Building from the southeast
- Location: Off County Highway 20, Northern Township
- Nearest city: Bemidji, Minnesota
- Coordinates: 47°32′2″N 94°49′35″W
- Area: 8 acres (3.2 ha)
- Built: 1937–9
- Architect: State of Minnesota, National Youth Administration
- Architectural style: National Park Service rustic
- MPS: Minnesota State Park CCC/WPA/Rustic Style MPS
- NRHP reference No.: 89001674
- Added to NRHP: October 25, 1989

Lake Bemidji State Park is a state park of Minnesota, United States, on the north shore of 6,765-acre (27.38 km^{2}) Lake Bemidji. The northern half of the park preserves a spruce-tamarack bog. A district of National Park Service rustic structures built by the Civilian Conservation Corps and National Youth Administration in the 1930s is on the National Register of Historic Places. The park is located 5 miles (8.0 km) north of the city of Bemidji.

== Geology and landscape ==
The landscape in the park is the last stage of the glacier in Minnesota. As the ice melted 10,000 years ago, soil, gravel, and rock were deposited creating the park's rolling topography. Many swamps and bogs were formed when chunks of ice separated from the receding glacier and left depressions which filled with water. Lake Bemidji was created by two huge blocks of ice being left behind by the retreating glacier.

The present landscape is not fixed. The land continues to change slowly due to the erosion by wind and water, shoreline wave action, and other acts of mother nature.

== History ==
For hundreds of years, ancestors to the Dakota people fished and hunted around Lake Bemidji. Around 1750 the Anishinaabe settled. The Anishinaabe called the lake "Bemiji-gau-maug" meaning "cutting sideways through" or diagonally. This was a reference to the path of the Mississippi River through the lake. Later Europeans, unable to pronounce the Anishinaabe name, simply referred to it as "Bemidji".

In the late 19th century, European immigrants migrated to this region to harvest the white and Norway pine trees. During the peak of logging, the lumber mill on the south shore of Lake Bemidji was the center of logging in the nation. When the government purchased the land, a few areas within the park boundaries were in a virgin state, preserving the towering forests. In 1923, the Minnesota State Legislature set aside 421 acres (1.70 km^{2}), establishing Lake Bemidji State Park.

Today, the park has grown to over 1,600 acres (6.5 km^{2}) to serve 150,000 plus visitors a year.

== Wildlife ==
The vegetation in the park supports many wildlife species. Birding is popular. Campers may hear the sounds of red-eyed and warbling vireos, rose-breasted grosbeaks, and many other song birds. Loons, eagles, herons, gulls, even osprey can be seen by the lakeshore. A hike on one of the park trails can yield a glimpse of a doe with her fawn, a porcupine having lunch halfway up a jackpine, or even an occasional black bear. Eastern chipmunks and red squirrels also adapt to the park's recreational areas.

In the wetland areas of the park, waterfowl, beaver, muskrat, and mink can be found. In the evening, the park is filled with sounds of gray treefrogs, spring peepers, and chorus and wood frogs. The woodland sound of a barred owl, the flute-like song of the veery, and the hammering of a sapsucker all add to the wilderness experience.

In all, nearly 50 species of mammals and almost 200 different kinds of birds can be seen throughout the year in Lake Bemidji State Park.

== Recreation ==
Lake Bemidji State Park offers recreational activities year round. Activities include camping, hiking, biking, cross country skiing, snowmobiling, snowshoeing, picnicking, swimming, volleyball, fishing, boating and interpretive programs.

=== Camping ===
The park has 95 drive-in sites, including 43 electric sites, 4 pull-through sites, and 4 handicapped accessible sites. In winter, only one site is available to drive-in. This is a non-electric site. Other sites are available on a walk-in basis after deep snow cover.

Two group camp sites are available. Bass Creek is a tent-only group camp that can accommodate up to 30 people. Water is available in the nearby parking area. The North Group Camp site accommodates up to 50 people and has three spaces for small trailers or pick-up campers. The group camps are available in winter but access is on foot. For group camp reservations, contact the state park reservation service at 1-866-85PARKS or online at www.stayatmnparks.com.

=== Trails ===
In the summer, there are 2 miles (3.2 km) of handicapped accessible trails, including the boardwalk and Rocky Point trail; 15 miles (24 km) of easy to moderate hiking trails that take you through areas of maturing pine, aspen and hardwoods; 6 miles (9.7 km) of paved bike trails which connect with the Paul Bunyan state trail; 5 Miles of mountain bike trails; and a 1/4 mile Bogwalk which is accessible by a 1-mile (1.6 km) hike.

The course for the Bemidji Blue Ox Marathon, first run in October 2013, travels through the park on the paved trails.

In the winter, there are 11 miles (18 km) of groomed cross country ski trails, 3 miles (4.8 km) of snowmobile trails that connect with an extensive trail system beyond the park, and you can snowshoe anywhere in the park except the groomed trails. Showshoes can be rented at the park office.

=== Recreational facilities ===
In the summer, park visitors can use the lakefront picnic and beach area which has picnic tables, an enclosed shelter with a fireplace, a volleyball court, a shower, restrooms, and pedestal grills. The shelter building and the sanitation building in the park were built by the Civilian Conservation Corps and the National Youth Administration, and are of rustic style log construction. These buildings are now listed on the National Register of Historic Places. The Shelter can be reserved by calling the park office.

There is a boat landing located next to the picnic area for those that wish to go fishing or boating. Canoes and fishing boats are available for rent from May 10 through October 13. There is also a handicapped accessible fishing pier.

In the winter, snowshoes are available for rent at the park office. Or, visitors can park in the picnic area parking lot, bring their own ice fishing equipment, and walk onto the lake to go fishing. There is a warming house located in the Trail Center, in the park's Visitor Center

=== Naturalist and interpretive programs ===
Throughout the year, the Visitor Center is a place where information about the park's trails, animals, geology, and other interesting features can be found through exhibits, films or slide programs. A complete list of programs and special programs or organized groups is available upon request.

Naturalist programs are offered Wednesday through Sunday from mid-June through Labor Day. Fall, winter and spring programs are generally offered on weekends. The Interpretive Center is open for schools, scouts and other community organizations upon request. Programs focus on the lake and wetland environments found in the park.

Interpretive programs in the summer include, morning hikes, boat tours of Lake Bemidji, evening films, and campfire talks. Winter programs include snowshoeing, candlelight skiing, and animal tracking. The Visitor Center is open daily and sometimes serves as a gathering place for interpretive programs where visitors share experiences by the warmth of the woodstove.

== Images ==
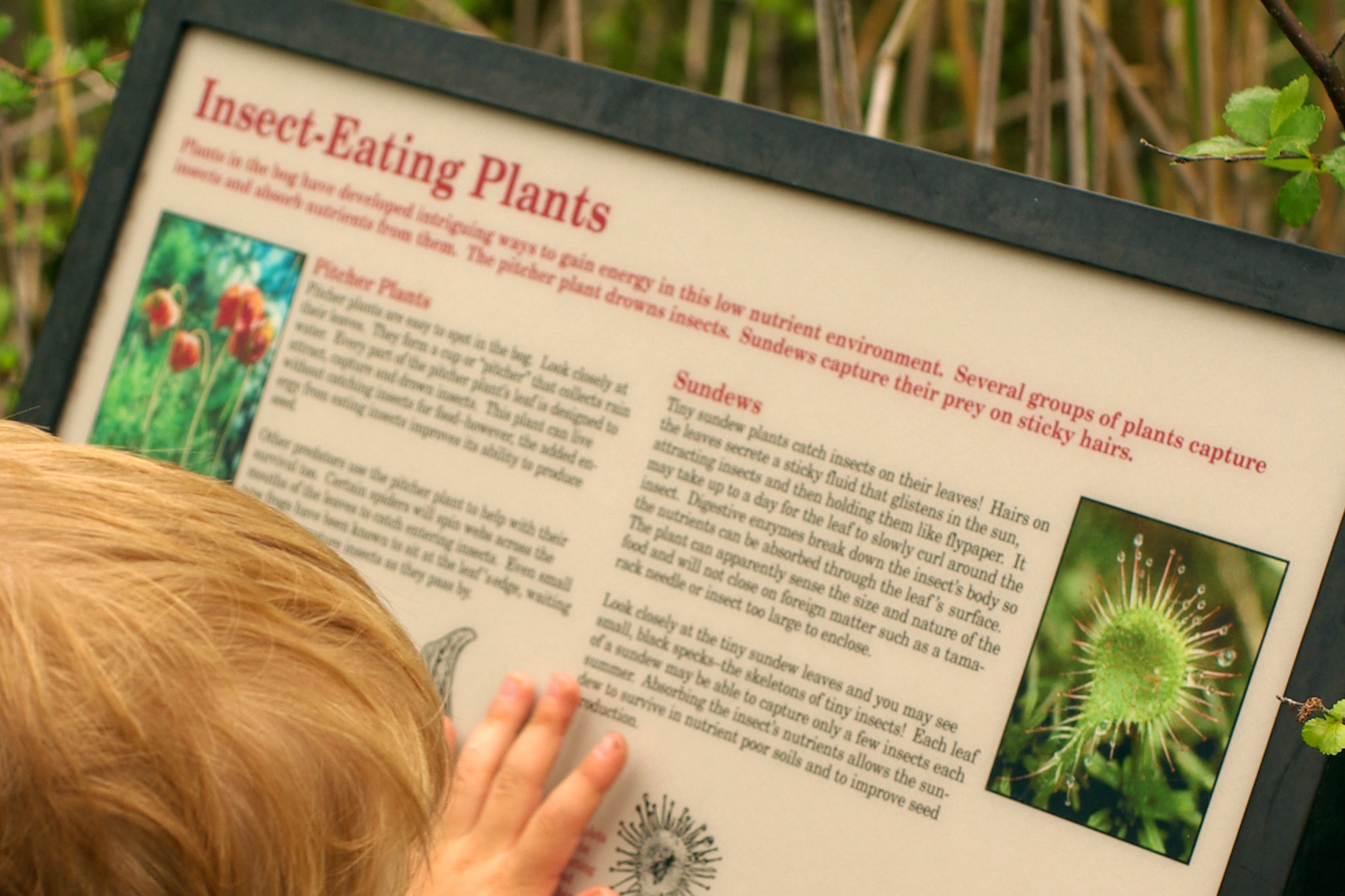
Bog Walk sign

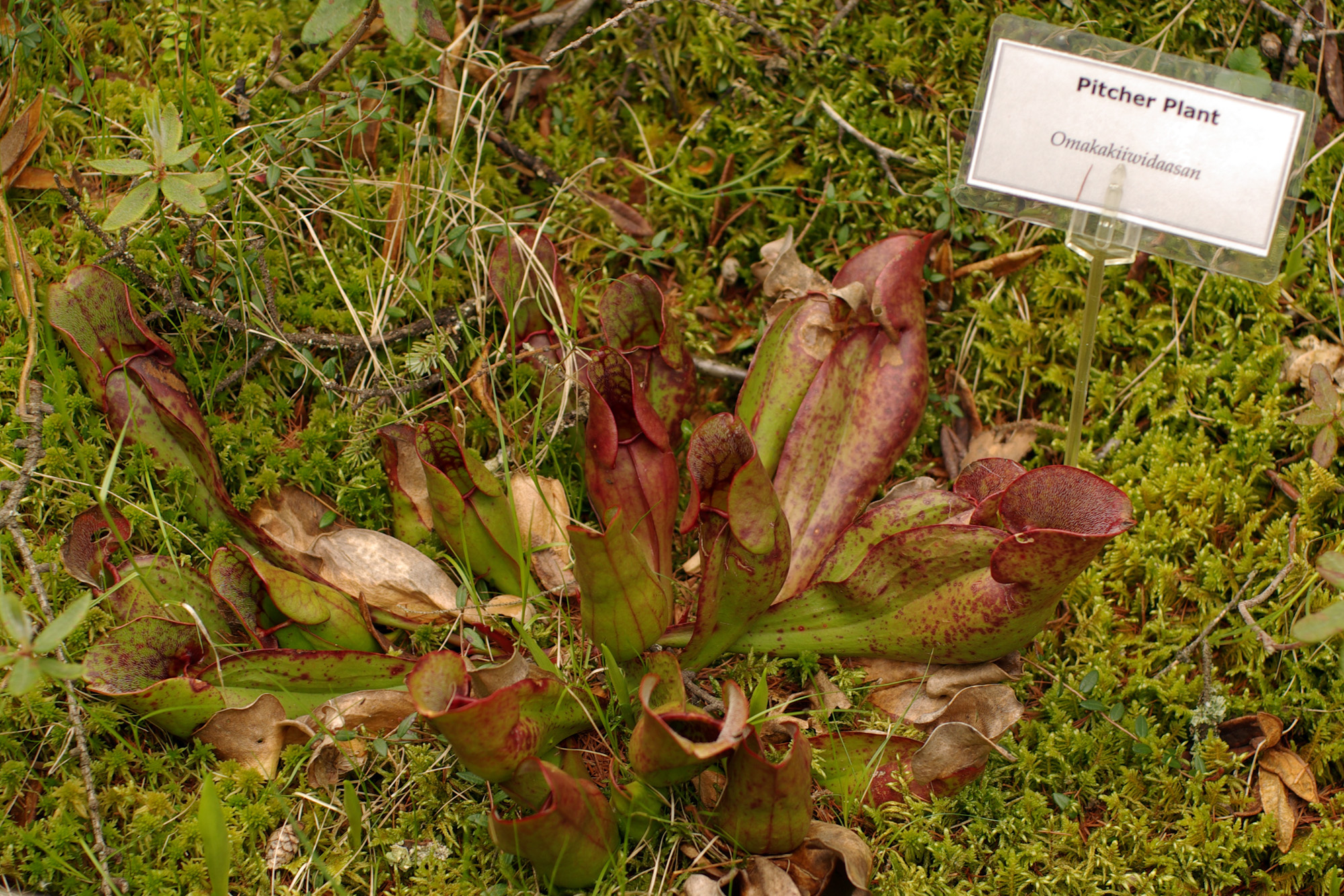
Pitcher plant

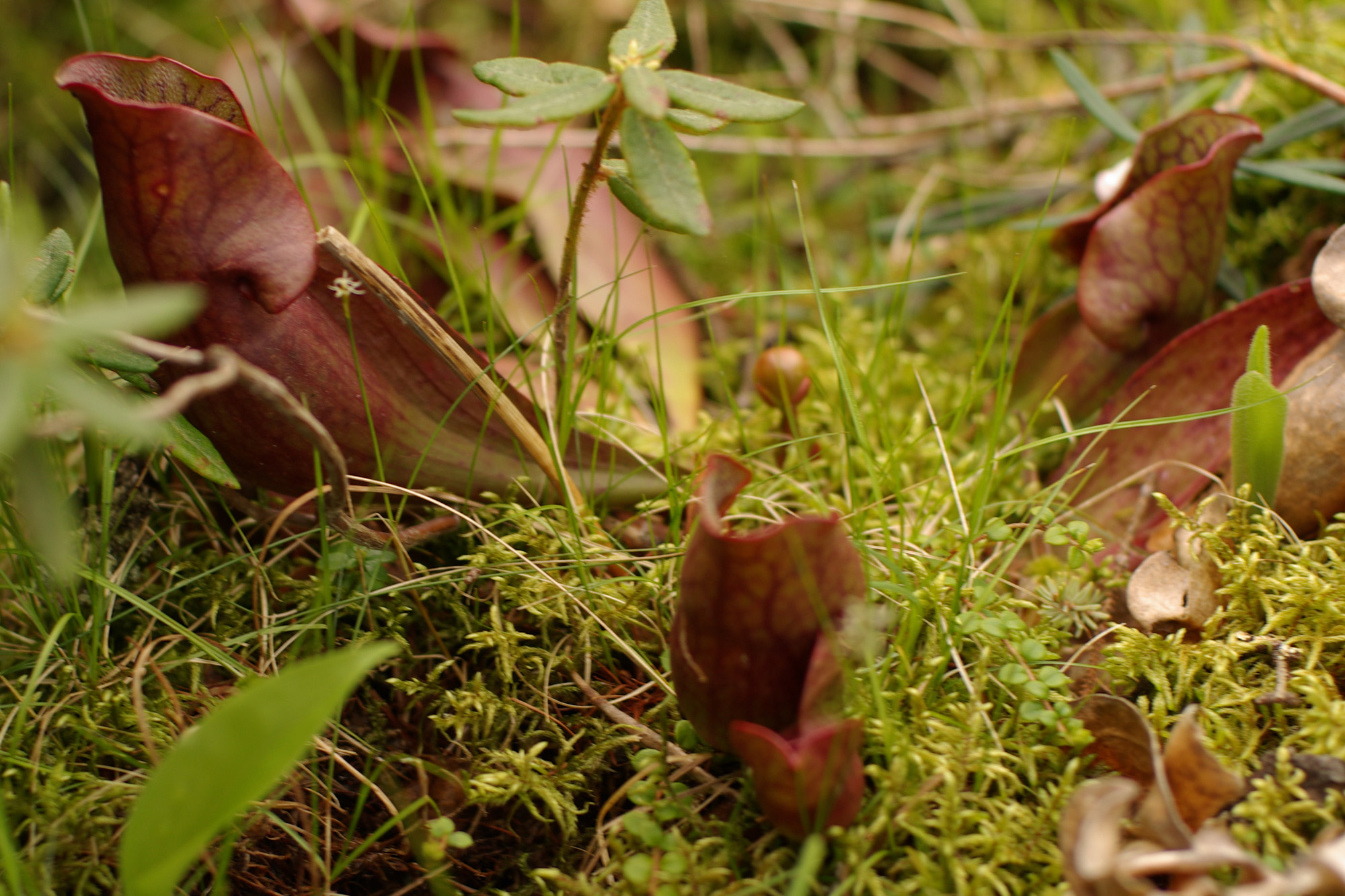
Pitcher plant before flowering

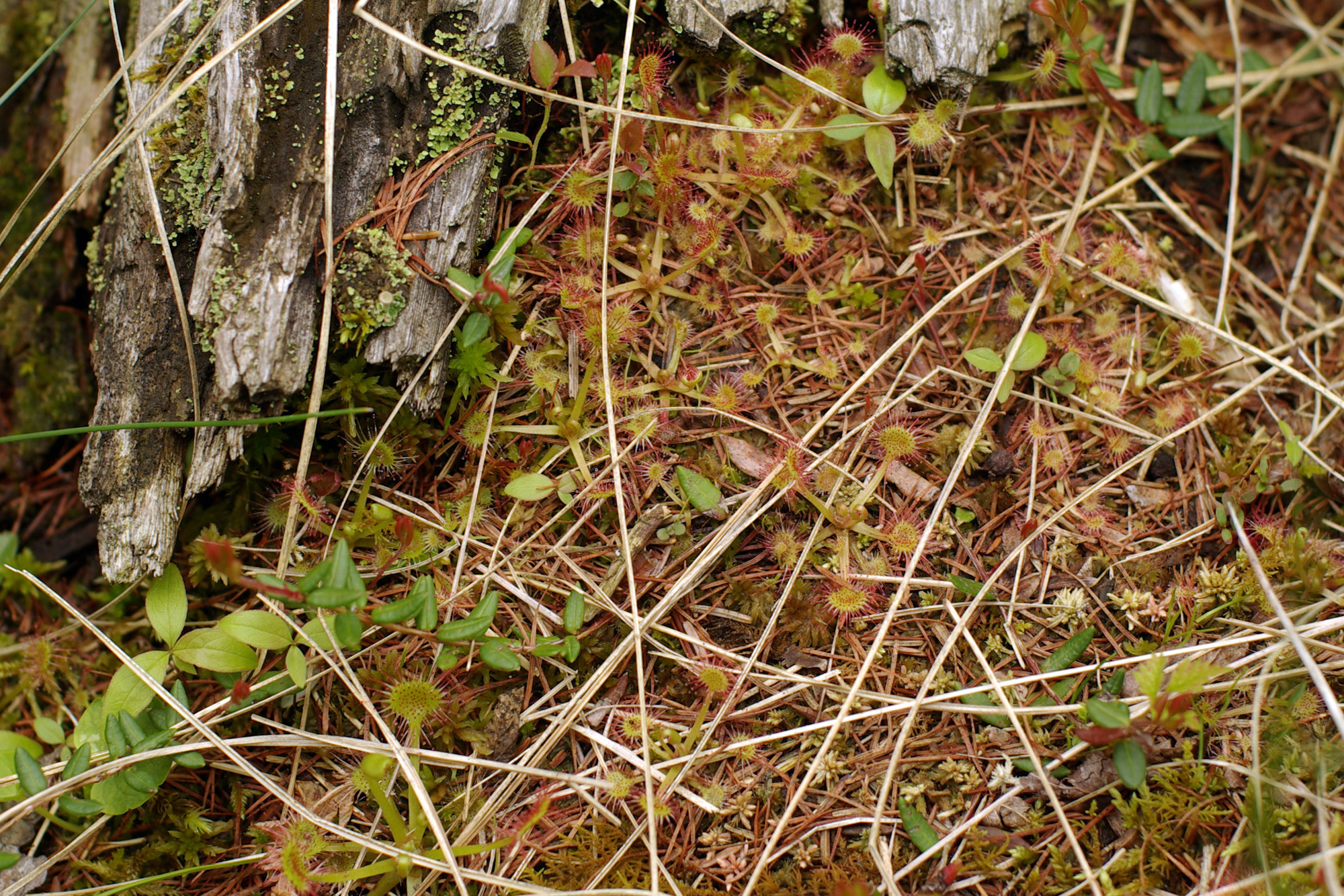
Round-leaf sundews

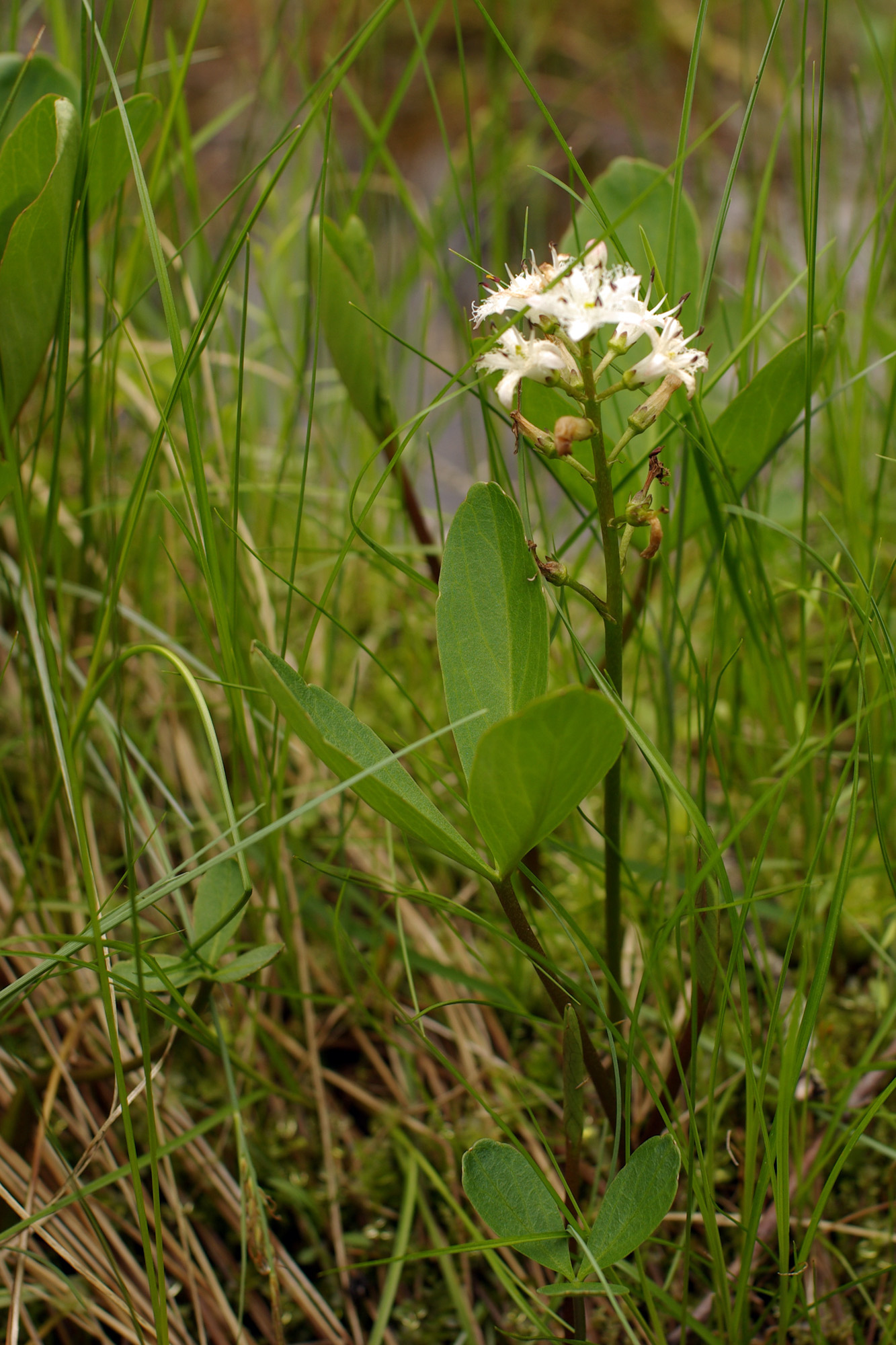
Bog flower
From the Bog Walk at Lake Bemidji State Park

== Sources ==
- DNR Website
- Lake Bemidji State Park Flyer. (12/2007). State of Minnesota, Department of Natural Resources
- Rustic Style Resources in Minnesota State Parks
- National Register of Historic Places Registration Form
