= KPMI =

KPMI may refer to:

- KPMI (AM), a radio station (1300 AM) licensed to serve Bemidji, Minnesota, United States
- KPMI-FM, a radio station (94.5 FM) licensed to serve Baudette, Minnesota
