= KBUN =

KBUN may refer to:

- KBUN (AM), a radio station (1450 AM) licensed to serve Bemidji, Minnesota, United States
- KBUN-FM, a radio station (104.5 FM) licensed to serve Blackduck, Minnesota
