= KKBJ =

KKBJ may refer to:

- KKBJ (AM), a radio station (1360 AM) licensed to Bemidji, Minnesota, United States
- KKBJ-FM, a radio station (103.7 FM) licensed to Bemidji, Minnesota, United States
