= WBJI =

Coordinates: 47.556°N 94.801°W

- Blackduck, Minnesota; United States
- Broadcast area: Bemidji, Minnesota
- Frequency: 98.3 MHz
- Branding: Babe Country 98.3

Programming
- Format: Commercial; Country
- Affiliations: Premiere Networks; Performance Racing Network

Ownership
- Owner: RP Broadcasting
- Sister stations: KKBJ, KKBJ-FM, KPMI, WMIS-FM

History
- First air date: 1986
- Call sign meaning: BemidJI

Technical information
- Licensing authority: FCC
- Facility ID: 54436
- Class: C1
- ERP: 100,000 Watts
- HAAT: 146 meters (479 ft)

Links
- Public license information: Public file; LMS
- Webcast: Listen Live
- Website: wbji.com

WBJI (98.3 FM), known as "Babe Country 98.3", is a radio station based in Bemidji, Minnesota, (licensed to Blackduck, Minnesota, by the Federal Communications Commission) and broadcasts contemporary country music. It is owned by RP Broadcasting.

The programming is all local except for the Bobby Bones Country Top 30, CMT After Midnight with Cody Alan, and CMT All Access with Cody Alan (all syndicated by Premiere Networks), Red Cup Country and 25 Years of Hits (syndicated by United Stations Radio Network). WBJI also previously broadcast non-local NASCAR programming.

Before "Babe Country 98.3" it was called, "Real Country 98.3" and "Good Time and Great Oldies 98", reflecting the two previous formats.
