= Omni Broadcasting =

Minnesota-based radio broadcasting company

Omni Broadcasting was a small-market radio broadcasting company that operated for 25 years from headquarters in Bemidji, Minnesota. Organized in 1988, the company was owned and operated by Louis H. Buron Jr., and Mary Campbell. They relocated from the Twin Cities to Bemidji, where, in 1989, the company acquired its first two stations, Paul Bunyan Broadcasting Company's KBUN and KBHP(FM). The offices and studios were located at 502 Beltrami Avenue in Bemidji.

Hubbard Broadcasting announced on November 13, 2014, that it would purchase the Omni Broadcasting stations. The sale was completed on February 27, 2015.

== Awards ==
The Omni Broadcasting stations won many industry awards for community service over the company's quarter-century of broadcasting.

KBHP(FM), Bemidji, won the National Association of Broadcasters' Crystal Award five times, in 1994, 1997, 1999, 2007, and 2010.

WJJY-FM, Brainerd, won NAB Crystal Awards in 2001, 2003, and 2007.

In 2008, Omni Broadcasting was a winner of the 10th annual Service to America awards. In partnership with Prevent Child Abuse Minnesota, each December the company's stations broadcast an annual 24-hour "Radiothon to End Child Abuse." In 2007, Omni stations provided free airtime valued at $276,000. The 2007 radiothon raised over $220,000. More than $2 million had been raised since the partnership began in 1989, at the time of the company's recognition for its service in 2008.

In 2011, in recognition of its long-term commitment to community service, KBHP(FM) was awarded the NAB's Crystal Heritage Award, only the second broadcast station to have been thus honored, from the time of the award's inception in 2008.

In October 2007, Omni President Louis H. Buron Jr., was inducted into the Museum of Broadcasting Hall of Fame in Golden Valley, MN.

== Death ==
Lou Buron died on January 23, 2017, at age 73.

== Stations ==
At the time of its sale to Hubbard, Omni Broadcasting owned and operated sixteen stations in four different markets across Minnesota:

=== Bemidji ===
- KBUN AM 1450 (Sports)
- KKZY FM 95.5 (Adult Contemporary)
- KLLZ-FM FM 99.1 (Classic rock)
- KBHP FM 101.1 (Country)
- KBUN-FM 104.5 (Sports)

=== Brainerd/Baxter ===
- KVBR AM 1340 (Business News/Talk)
- KLIZ AM 1380 (Sports)
- KBLB FM 93.3 (Country)
- KUAL-FM 103.5 (Oldies)
- WJJY-FM 106.7 (Adult Contemporary)
- KLIZ-FM 107.5 (Classic rock)

=== Wadena ===
- KWAD AM 920 (Classic Country)
- KNSP AM 1430 (Classic Country)
- KKWS FM 105.9 (Country)

=== Alexandria ===
- KULO FM 94.3 (Oldies)
- KIKV-FM FM 100.7 (Country)
