= KKWS =

- Wadena, Minnesota; United States
- Broadcast area: Central and northern Minnesota
- Frequency: 105.9 MHz
- Branding: Superstation K106

Programming
- Format: Country
- Affiliations: Compass Media Networks; Westwood One

Ownership
- Owner: Hubbard Broadcasting, Inc.; (HBI Radio Brainerd/Wadena, LLC)
- Sister stations: KWAD, KNSP

Technical information
- Licensing authority: FCC
- Facility ID: 28650
- Class: C1
- ERP: 100,000 watts
- HAAT: 171 meters (561 ft)
- Transmitter coordinates: 46°35′59″N 94°54′04″W

Links
- Public license information: Public file; LMS
- Webcast: Listen Live
- Website: superstationk106.com

KKWS (105.9 FM "Superstation K106") is a radio station that broadcasts a country music format. Licensed to Wadena, Minnesota, United States, it serves central and northern Minnesota. The station is owned and operated by Hubbard Broadcasting, Inc.

KKWS is located at 201½ South Jefferson Street, in Wadena, along with sister stations KWAD and KNSP.

Hubbard Broadcasting announced on November 13, 2014, that it would purchase the Omni Broadcasting stations, including KKWS. The sale was completed on February 27, 2015, at a purchase price of $8 million for the 16 stations and one translator.
