= KWAD =

Classic country radio station in Wadena, Minnesota, United States

- Wadena, Minnesota; United States
- Broadcast area: Wadena County, Minnesota
- Frequency: 920 kHz
- Branding: KWAD Radio

Programming
- Format: Classic country
- Affiliations: Westwood One

Ownership
- Owner: Hubbard Broadcasting, Inc.; (HBI Radio Brainerd/Wadena, LLC)
- Sister stations: KKWS, KNSP

History
- First air date: 1949
- Former call signs: KWMR (1947, CP)
- Call sign meaning: Wadena

Technical information
- Licensing authority: FCC
- Facility ID: 28649
- Class: B
- Power: 1,000 watts
- Transmitter coordinates: 46°22′13″N 95°9′14″W
- Translator: 101.7 K269HE (Wadena)

Links
- Public license information: Public file; LMS
- Website: www.kwadam920.com

KWAD (920 AM, "Classic Hit Country") is a radio station broadcasting a classic country music format. Licensed to Wadena, Minnesota, United States, the station serves the Wadena area. The station is owned by Hubbard Broadcasting, Inc. (through licensee HBI Radio Brainerd/Wadena, LLC) and features programming from Westwood One. The KWAD signal is rebroadcast in the FM band on 101.7 MHz by co-owned Translator Station K269HE.

Hubbard Broadcasting announced on November 13, 2014, that it would purchase the Omni Broadcasting stations, including KWAD. The sale was completed on February 27, 2015, at a purchase price of $8 million for the 16 stations and one translator.
