= WMIS-FM =

- Blackduck, Minnesota; United States
- Broadcast area: Bemidji, Minnesota
- Frequency: 92.1 MHz
- Branding: 92.1 The River

Programming
- Format: Commercial; Mainstream Rock

Ownership
- Owner: Paskvan Media, Inc.
- Sister stations: KPMI, KKBJ-FM, WBJI, KKBJ-AM

History
- First air date: October 1, 2007
- Call sign meaning: Mississippi River

Technical information
- Licensing authority: FCC
- Class: C2
- ERP: 36,000 watts
- HAAT: 176 meters
- Transmitter coordinates: 47° 33' 26" N, 94° 48' 05" W
- Translators: K237FJ (95.3 MHz, Thief River Falls); W300BP (107.9 MHz, Grand Rapids, Minnesota)

Links
- Public license information: Public file; LMS
- Webcast: Listen Live
- Website: wmisfm.com

WMIS-FM (92.1 FM, "92.1 The River") is an American radio station licensed to serve the community of Blackduck, Minnesota. The station's broadcast license is held by Paskvan Media, Inc.

It broadcasts a Mainstream Rock music format to the Bemidji, Minnesota, area. Programming includes Bob and Sheri and other programming.
