= KLLZ-FM =

Coordinates: 47.214°N 94.922°W

- Walker, Minnesota; United States
- Broadcast area: Bemidji, Minnesota
- Frequency: 99.1 MHz
- Branding: Z99

Programming
- Format: Classic rock
- Affiliations: United Stations Radio Networks

Ownership
- Owner: Hubbard Broadcasting, Inc.; (HBI Radio Bemidji, LLC)
- Sister stations: KBUN, KBHP, KBUN-FM, KKZY

History
- First air date: 1984; 42 years ago (as KLLR-FM at 99.3)
- Former call signs: KLLR-FM (1984–1991)
- Former frequencies: 99.3 MHz (1984–1990)

Technical information
- Licensing authority: FCC
- Facility ID: 28656
- Class: C1
- ERP: 100,000 watts
- HAAT: 154 meters

Links
- Public license information: Public file; LMS
- Webcast: Listen Live
- Website: z99fm.com

KLLZ-FM (99.1 MHz, "Z99") is a radio station broadcasting from Bemidji, Minnesota (licensed to Walker, Minnesota), and airs a classic rock format. It has a wide coverage area across northern Minnesota, and enjoys a huge listening audience. KLLZ is owned by Hubbard Broadcasting, Inc. The Bemidji studios are located at 502 Beltrami Avenue, downtown Bemidji. The original transmitter site was along Highway 71, near Lake George. At the same time as the Hubbard sale, a new transmitter and antenna were installed at the existing KBHP transmitter site.

Z99 is the official radio station of Moondance Jam, a four-day outdoor concert held in Walker, Minnesota every July.

== History ==
The station signed on the air in May 1984 with the call sign KLLR-FM, licensed to Michael C. Steele. It was originally assigned the frequency 99.3 MHz, operating at maximum Class A station effective radiated power of 3 kW.

In May 1988 Edward De La Hunt acquired the station.

In March 1990, KLLR-FM was authorized to change to 99.1 MHz and increase power to 50 kW.

In April 1991, KLLR-FM was acquired by Sioux Valley Broadcasting Co.

In July 1991, the station's call sign was changed to KLLZ. In May 1994, the "-FM" suffix was added.

In July 1994, KLLZ-FM was acquired by Ingstad Broadcasting, Inc.

In April 1996, KLLZ-FM was acquired by Kommerstad Communications Co., LLC., from Ingstad Communications, Inc., as part of a $4.1 million deal that also included stations in Brainerd, Wadena, and Staples, Minnesota

On December 31, 2000, KLLZ-FM was acquired by Omni Broadcasting subsidiary BG Broadcasting, Inc. The purchase price was $560,000.

Hubbard Broadcasting announced on November 13, 2014 that it would purchase the Omni Broadcasting stations, including KLLZ-FM. The sale was completed on February 27, 2015, at a purchase price of $8 million for the 16 stations and one translator.

== Programming ==
Live programming begins at 6 am with Scott Williams. The show features sports reporting with Kevin Jackson and local news with Larissa Donovan. Scott was also the voice of Bemidji State Hockey on (Lakeland Public Television) KAWE channel 9, covering Beaver Football and Basketball for the campus television station KBSU channel 17, and is a co-host of "High Noon" on KBUN AM 1450.
