= Shaynowishkung =

Ojibwe leader (1819 – 1904)

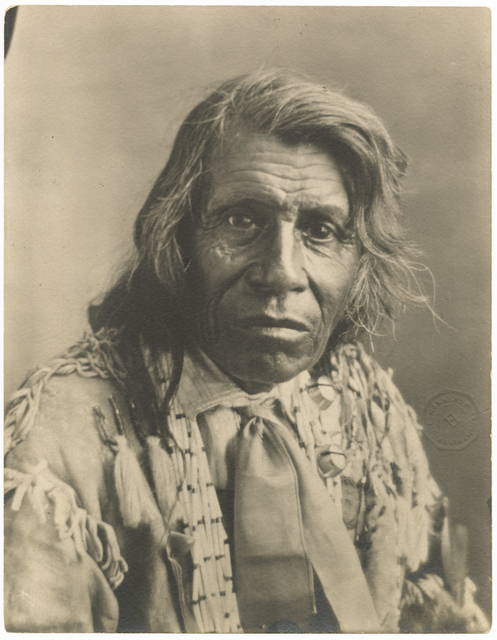
- Shaynowishkung c.1900 by Niels Larson Hakkerup
- Born: 1819; Near Inger, Minnesota, U.S.
- Died: April 19, 1904 (aged 84–85); Cass Lake, Minnesota, U.S.
- Resting place: Greenwood Cemetery; Bemidji, Minnesota, U.S.
- Other names: Chief Bemidji; John Bemidji
- Spouse: Ka-ge-gay-ah-nah-quod-oke
- Children: 8

Shaynowishkung (English: He Who Rattles; c. 1819 – April 19, 1904) sometimes referred to as Chief Bemidji or John Bemidji, was a Ojibwe leader of the Leech Lake Band of Ojibwe. Shaynowishkung is noted as being the first permanent settler and resident of Bemidji, Minnesota before its founding in 1888. Although not a chieftain in the traditional sense, Shaynowishkung was a spokesperson for some 50 people of both the Leech Lake and Cass Lake Bands of Ojibwe who lived on the southern shores of Lake Bemidji.

== Early life ==
Shaynowishkung was born around 1819 near modern-day Inger, Minnesota in Itasca County, Minnesota. Not much is known about Shaynowishkung's upbringing with the exception that he was moved to the Leech Lake Indian Reservation during the creation of the Indian reservation system in Minnesota around 1855. In 1860 Shaynowishkung married a Leech Lake Pillager Ojibwe woman named Ka-ge-gay-ah-nah-quod-oke, together they had a total of eight children.

During the Dakota War of 1862 Shaynowishkung was an advocate for peace between the Ojibwe and White settlers in northern Minnesota and spoke out against joining Little Crow and the Dakota people in their uprising.

== First resident of Bemidji ==
Shaynowishkung first moved to what is now Bemidji in Beltrami county beginning in 1882 after the death of his wife. Shaynowishkung settled land with several other Leech Lake and Cass Lake Ojibwe on the southern portion of Lake Bemidji near the trading post of Marion Ellsworth Carson (1864-1932), a local trapper and trader. Carson eventually married one of Shaynowishkung's daughters, , otherwise known as Mary Carson.

Bemidji was not formally established as a city until 1888 and incorporated on May 20, 1896, making Shaynowishkung the earliest permanent resident of the area. In 1888 when first introduced to European settlers he told them the name of the lake, Bemijigamaag. According to Ojibwe linguist Anton Treuer Bemijigamaag or Bimijigamaa roughly translates to "where the current/ water cuts across". This was misinterpreted however and settlers thought he was telling them his name, Shaynowishkung was thence occasional called "Chief Bemidji" despite not being a tribal leader, nor his name being Bemidji. Shaynowishkung died on April 19, 1904 in Cass Lake, Minnesota, he is buried at the Greenwood Cemetery in Bemidji.

== Legacy ==
The Chief Theater (also called the Paul Bunyan Playhouse) in Bemidji was erected in 1927 and was originally named in honor of Shaynowishkung. Three statues of Shaynowishkung have existed throughout the years. The first statue was built in 1901 shortly before Shaynowishkung's death in 1904. The second statue was built in 1952, as neither of the two first statues correctly portrayed Shaynowishkung, a third iteration of the statue was built in 2015 by Minnesota artist and sculptor Gareth Curtiss with the help of the Leech Lake Band of Ojibwe and several of Shaynowishkung's ancestors. Another monument to Shaynowishkung exists in the Greenwood Cemetery in Bemidji where he is buried.
