= Bemidji, Minnesota =

City in Minnesota, United States

- City
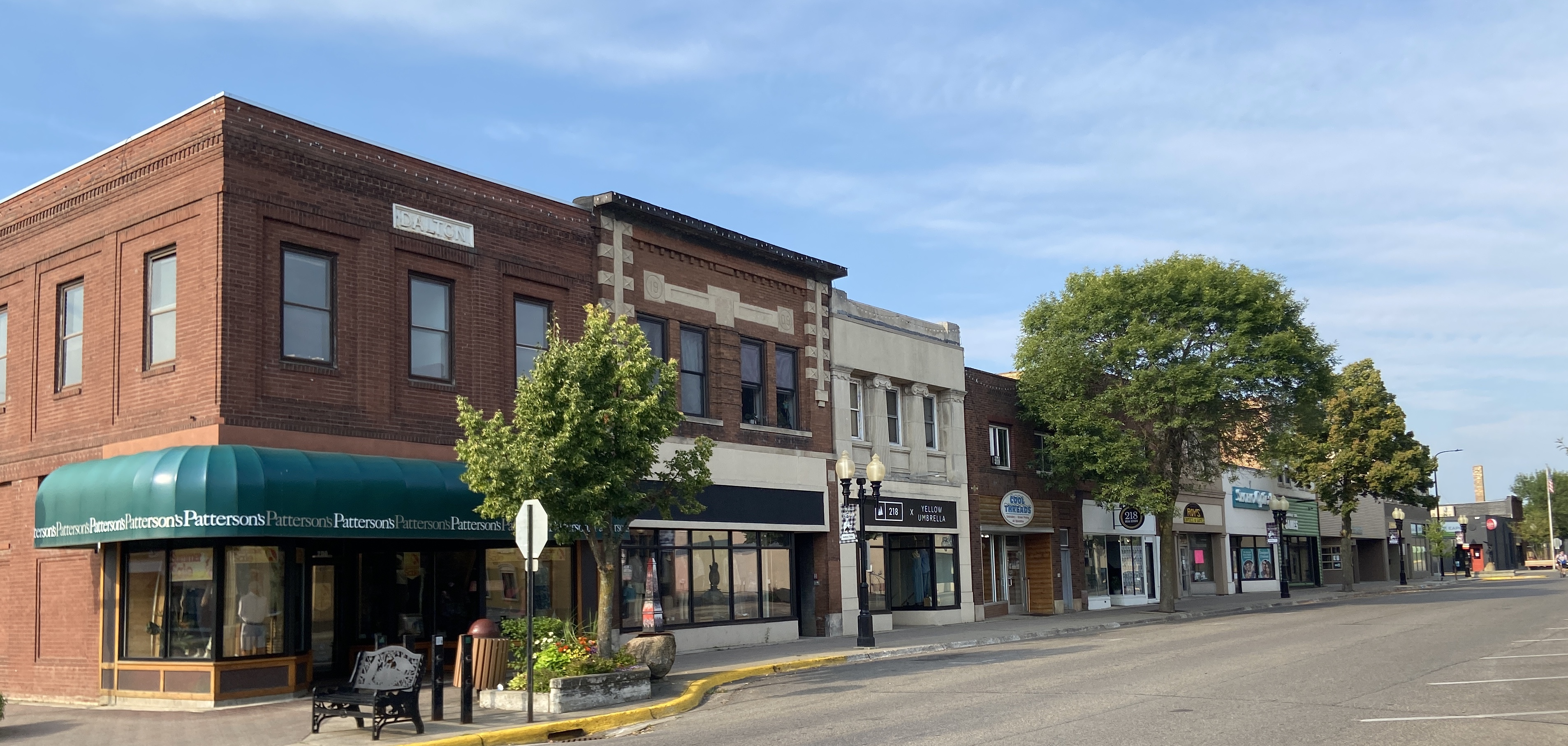
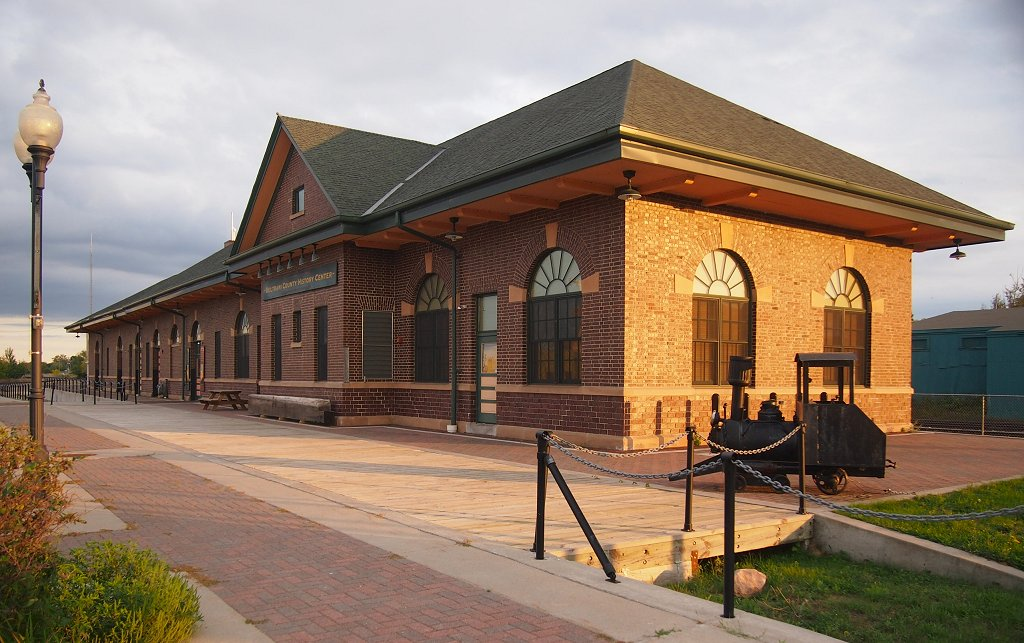
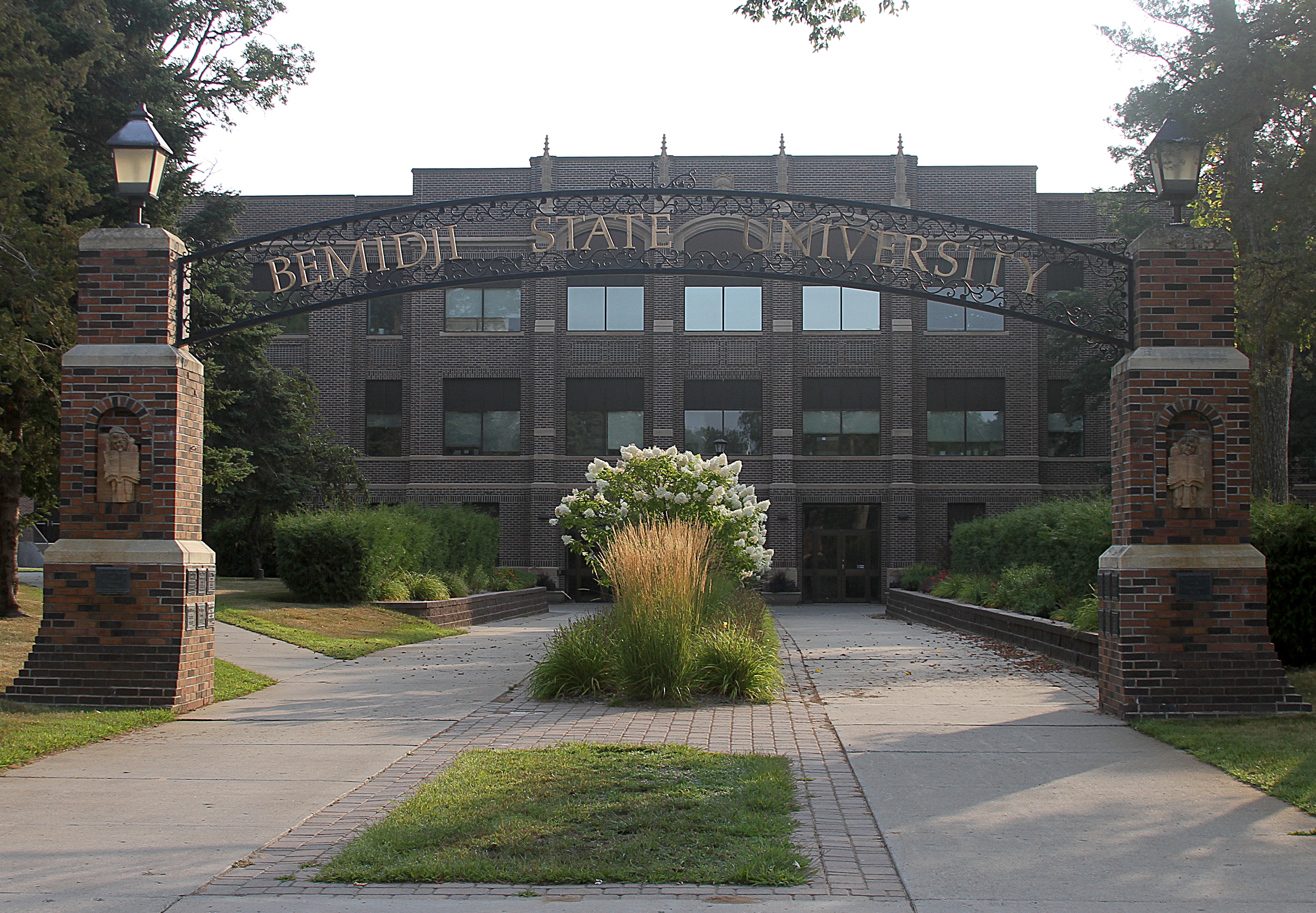
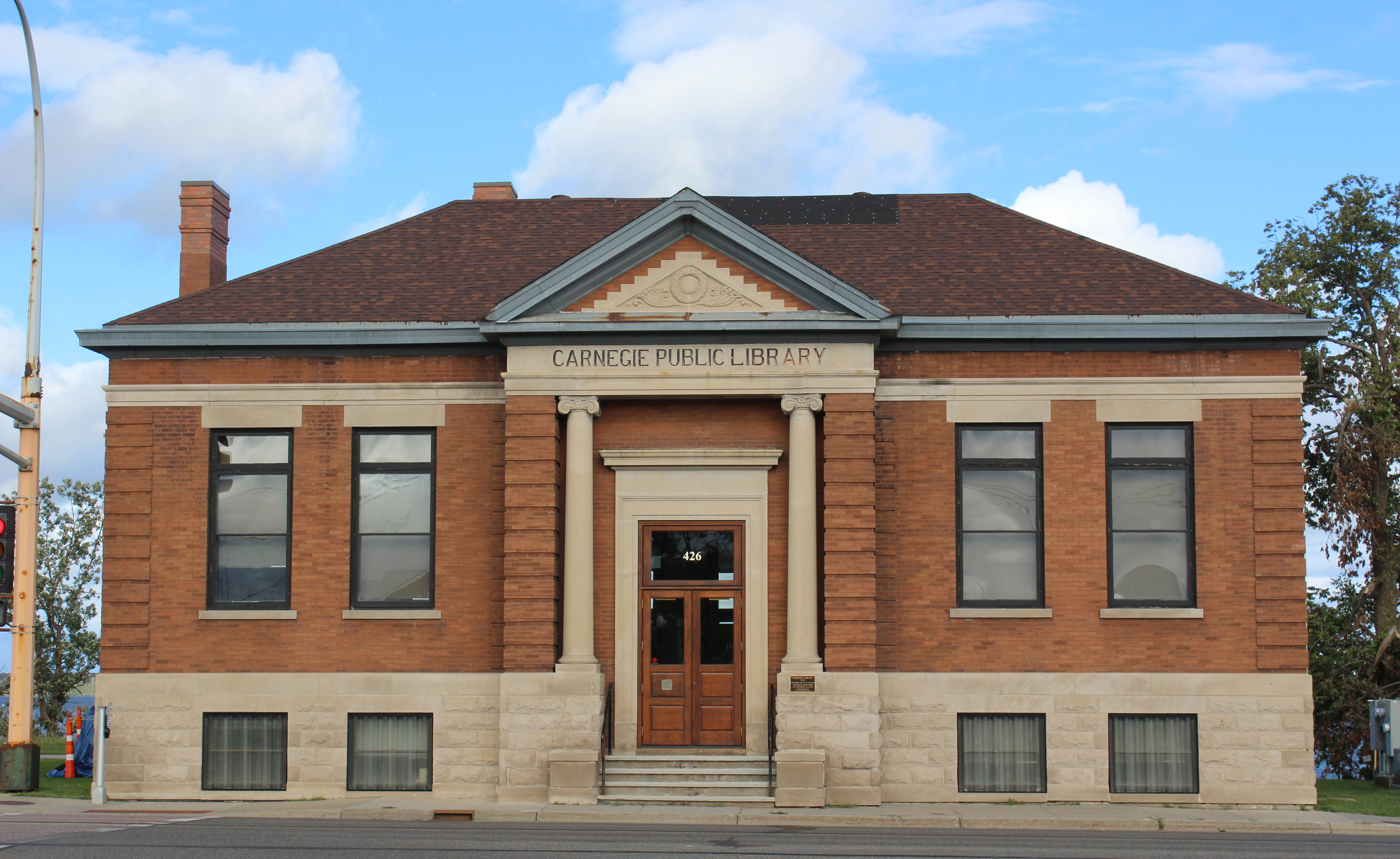
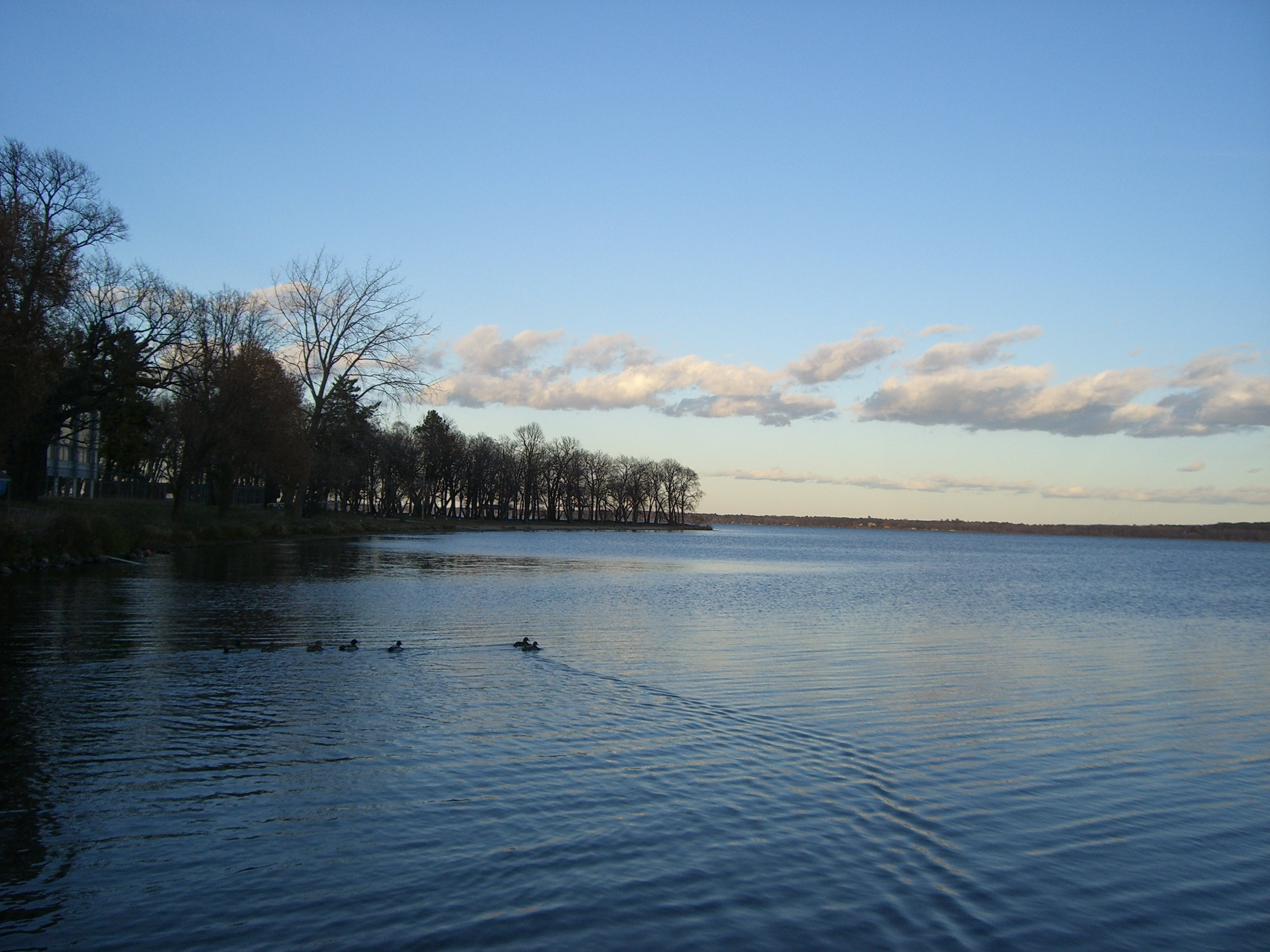
- Downtown Bemidji Great Northern Depot Bemidji State University Bemidji Carnegie Library Lake Bemidji

- Flag
- Motto: "The First City on the Mississippi"
- Interactive map of Bemidji, Minnesota
- Location within Minnesota
- Coordinates: 47.487034°N 94.88269°W
- Country: United States
- State: Minnesota
- County: Beltrami
- Founded: 1888
- Incorporated: May 20, 1896

Government
  - Type: Mayor–council
  - Mayor: Jorge Prince
  - Councilmembers: Gwenia Fiskevold Gould; Josh Peterson; Mark Dickinson; Emelie Rivera; Lynn Eaton
  - At Large: Audrey M. Thayer

Area
  - City: 22.335 sq mi (57.847 km^{2})
  - Land: 17.440 sq mi (45.169 km^{2})
  - Water: 4.895 sq mi (12.679 km^{2}) 21.90%
- Elevation: 1,368 ft (417 m)

Population (2020)
  - City: 14,574
  - Estimate (2025): 15,770
  - Density: 835.67/sq mi (322.65/km^{2})
  - Urban: 14,849
  - Metro: 47,055 (US: 247th)
- Time zone: UTC−6 (Central (CST))
  - Summer (DST): UTC−5 (CDT)
- ZIP Code: 56601
- Area code: 218
- FIPS code: 27-05068
- GNIS feature ID: 0655325
- Website: ci.bemidji.mn.us

Bemidji (/bəˈmɪdʒiː/ bə-MIJ-ee) is a city in and the county seat of Beltrami County, Minnesota, United States. The population was 14,574 as of the 2020 census, and was estimated at 15,770 in 2025, making it the largest commercial center between Grand Forks, North Dakota and Duluth.

As a central city for three Indian reservations, Bemidji is the site of many Native American services, including the Indian Health Service. Near Bemidji are the Red Lake Indian Reservation, White Earth Indian Reservation, and the Leech Lake Indian Reservation. Bemidji lies on the southwest shore of Lake Bemidji, the northernmost lake feeding the Mississippi River; it is nicknamed "The First City on the Mississippi". Bemidji is also the self-proclaimed "curling capital" of the U.S. and the alleged birthplace of the legendary Paul Bunyan.

== Etymology ==
According to Minnesota Geographic Names, its name derives from the Ojibwe Buh-mid-ji-ga-maug (Double-Vowel orthography: bemijigamaag), meaning "a lake with crossing waters". This name stems from the way that the Mississippi River flows directly through the Lake. Shaynowishkung, an Ojibwe leader, moved to the area in 1882 and became the first permanent settler of Bemidji. He informed early white settlers of the name of the lake, but they misunderstood him to mean that bemidji was his own name. Consequently, he was known to them as Chief Bemidji.

On occasion, in Ojibwe, Bemidji is called Wabigamaang ("at the lake channel/narrows"), because part of the city is situated on the Lakes Bemidji/Irving narrows, on the south end of Lake Bemidji, and extends to the eastern shore of Lake Irving.

== History ==
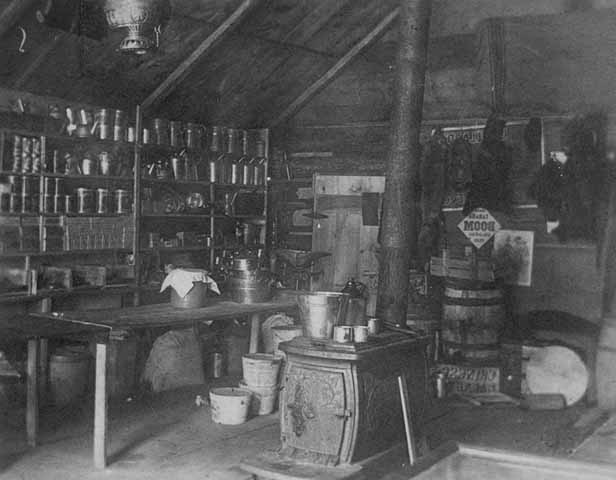
1894 photo of Carson's Trading Post.

Beltrami County was established by an act of legislation on February 28, 1866.

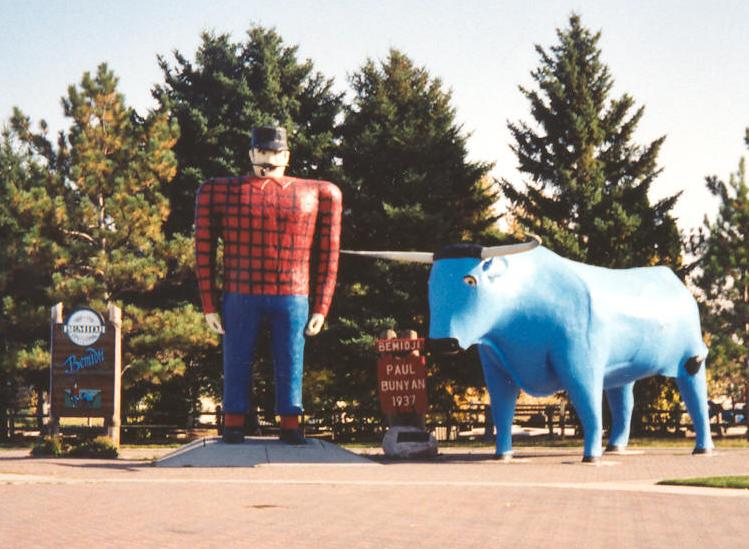
Paul Bunyan and Babe statues, Bemidji

Bemidji Township was surveyed by European Americans in 1874. It was organized in 1896, 24 days after the village of Bemidji was chartered, and is the oldest township in the county. In 1897, the county attorney declared the original Bemidji township organization illegal (no reason given) and the township reorganized on June 26, 1897.

About 50 Leech Lake Indians lived along the south shore of the lake prior to the 1880s. They called the lake Bemidjigumaug, meaning "river or route flowing crosswise". Freeman and Besty Doud claimed 160 acres west of and including present-day Diamond Point; they were Bemidji's first homesteaders. The Porter Nye family soon followed them.

John Steidl's sawmill was on the east bank of the Mississippi River, close to Carson's Trading Post. Remore Hotel and Carl Carlson's blacksmith shop were on the west side of the river. Bemidji was incorporated on May 20, 1896, and by that time there were three publishing companies, Alber Kaiser, The Bemidji Pioneer, and the Beltrami County News. William Bartleson's Stage and Express Service was created to carry mail between Bemidji and Park Rapids. He was advertised by Speelman's Eagle, owned by Clarence Speelman, along with other stores. By 1898, railroads came to Bemidji and brought even more business. By 1900 the Village of Bemidji's population had grown to 2,000.

Thomas Barlow Walker and John S. and Charles Pillsbury invested millions into timber in 1874, since beaver pelts were nearing depletion by the mid-1890s. Walker owned Red River Lumber Company of Crookston, which claimed almost half of Beltrami County's timber. He soon sold his sawmill and timber claim to Thomas Shevlin and Frank Hixon. Logging was done in the winter and sawmilling in the summer. Crookston opened 13 logging camps, which provided jobs and homes for lumberjacks. Between 1907 and 1910 drought and forest fires came to northern Minnesota. Lumber production was Bemidji's major industry, but on July 19, 1914, a sawmill burned down, causing disaster for business. It was later rebuilt. During the Great Depression of the 1930s, Bemidji's business profited, providing food, materials, and services for the Civilian Conservation Corps and Youth Conservation Corps programs. During the war years lumber business stopped, but when men came back from war lumber business boomed, since many people needed homes.

By the 1870s, timber cruisers were already making forays into the great pine forests that surrounded Bemidji. They were seeking new timberlands for Walker, the Pillsburys, Henry Akeley, Charles Ruggles and Frederick Weyerhaeuser, the barons of the wood industry.

Art Lee created the story that the folkloric figure Paul Bunyan came from the Northwoods. Tales about Paul Bunyan and Babe the Blue Ox led to public sculptures of them in the 1930s. According to Discover America, the Paul and Babe statues are "the second most photographed statues in America," surpassed only by Mount Rushmore. The Rotarians of Bemidji commissioned the statue of Paul Bunyan during the Great Depression as a tourist attraction. It was unveiled on January 15, 1937, to kick off a Winter Carnival that drew more than 10,000 visitors.

Today Bemidji is an important educational, governmental, trade and medical center for north central Minnesota. The wood industry is still a significant part of the local economy, with Georgia-Pacific, Potlatch, and Northwood Panelboard all having waferboard plants in the local area. They use wood species that were once classified as waste trees.

== Parks and recreation ==
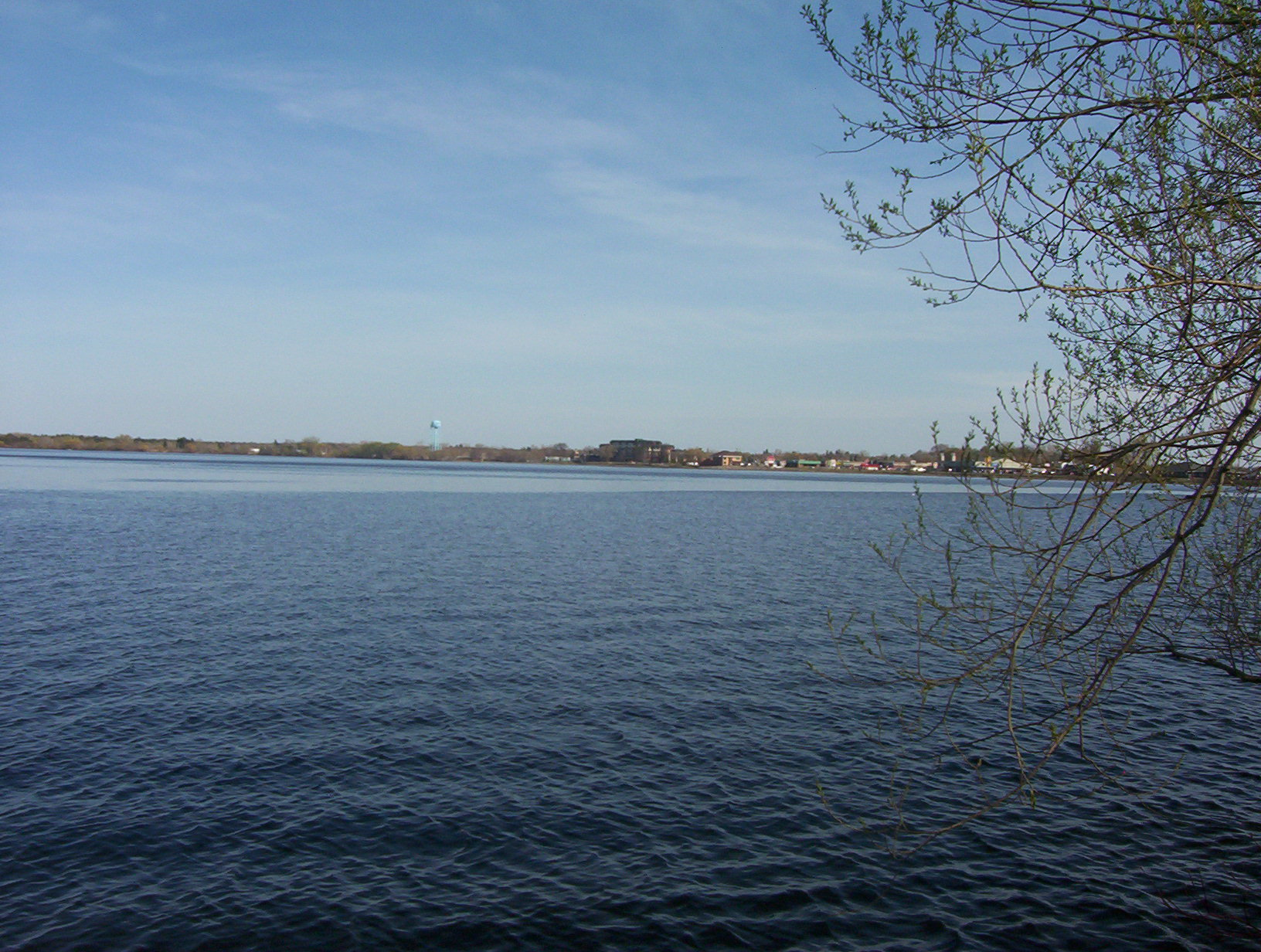
Lake Bemidji

Bemidji is near Chippewa National Forest, Itasca State Park, Lake Bemidji State Park, Big Bog State Recreation Area, and state forest areas. There are 400 lakes within 25 miles (40 km), 500 mi (800 km) of snowmobile trails and 99 mi (160 km) of cross-country ski trails.

The Paul Bunyan State Trail runs from Brainerd, Minnesota, and Lake Bemidji State Park. It is used for walking, biking, snowmobiling, and cross-country skiing. There is also a bike trail around Lake Bemidji about 17 miles long. Each year an event is held where families and individuals can bike around the lake, with rest stops along the way.

Art in the Park, hosted by Paul Bunyan Communications and Watermark Art Center, is held every year at Bemidji Library Park, across from the Watermark Art Center. Art in the Park has been a summer highlight for Bemidji residents since 1967. The event features more than 100 artists, food vendors, and live entertainment. A variety of items are sold, made in such materials as wood and ceramics, along with clothing and jewelry, photography, metalworking, greeting cards, homemade preserves, food, candles, and soaps. Roughly 4,000 people attend annually. The festival has been renamed the Watermark Art Festival and was held at Library Park on July 16–17, 2022.

Every year, in the first week of August, teams compete in the Dragon Boat races. There are also many food vendors, kids' activities, and musical and cultural performances. In the early 21st century, dragon boat racing was the fastest growing water sport in the nation.

The Bemidji Polar Days, also known as Winterfest, is a weeklong festival that includes many different activities, such as a polar plunge, and sled derby, broomball, a 5k polar walk/run, curling, pond hockey, and a cornhole tournament.

The Paul Bunyan Triathlon takes place the third Saturday in August. The Minnesota Finlandia Ski Marathon is also held in Bemidji.

== Geography ==
According to the United States Census Bureau, the city has a total area of 22.335 square miles (57.85 km^{2}), of which 17.440 square miles (45.17 km^{2}) is land and 4.895 square miles (12.68 km^{2}) (21.90%) is water.

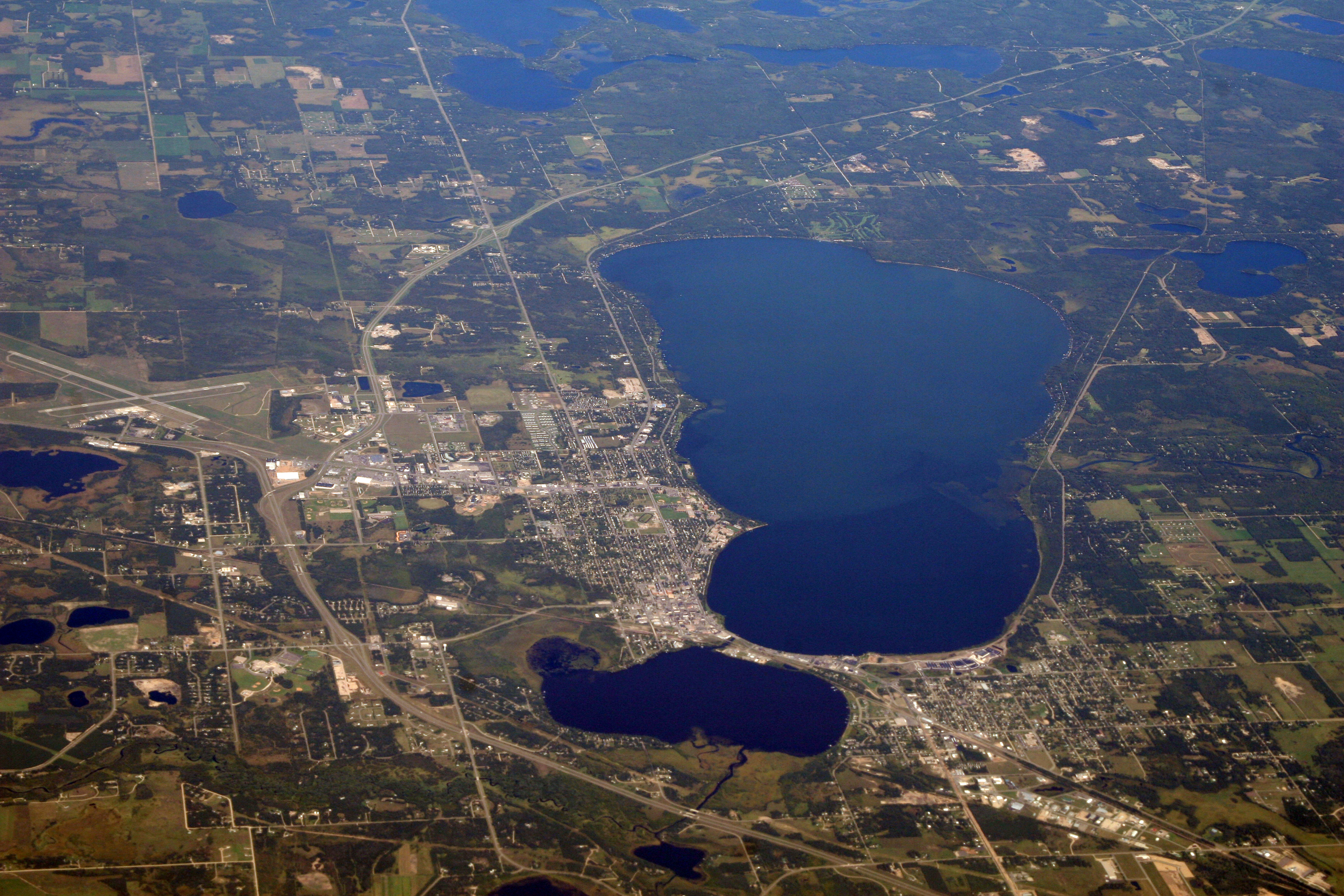
Aerial photo of the city and lake

Four-lane U.S. Route 2, U.S. Route 71 and Minnesota State Highway 197 are three of the main routes in the city. Minnesota State Highways 89 and 371 are nearby.

The largest earthquake on record for the Bemidji area was recorded on September 3, 1917. It is claimed that it shook houses in Bemidji and across northern Minnesota. The epicenter was about 95 miles (153 km) away in Staples, Minnesota, and it affected an area of 48,000 square kilometres (19,000 sq mi); it had a magnitude 4.4 with a maximum intensity of VI to VII. The closest and most recent quake occurred in Walker, Minnesota, on September 27, 1982, with a magnitude of 2.0.

== Climate ==
Bemidji has a hemiboreal humid continental climate, Dfb in the Köppen climate classification: short, warm summers, and long, severe winters. The average mean annual temperature in Bemidji is 38.6 °F (3.7 °C). The coldest month is January with an average daily high of 16 °F (−9 °C) and an average daily low of −5 °F (−21 °C). The warmest month is July with an average daily high of 77 °F (25 °C) and an average daily low of 57 °F (14 °C). The average annual humidity is 47%. The average annual snowfall is 46.7 inches (118.6 cm) and the average annual rainfall is 26.6 inches (676 mm). The average day Lake Bemidji freezes over is November 26 and the average day the ice goes off the lake is April 26.

Annual snowfall in the Bemidji Area increased 5% in the 21st century vs. the 1930–1999 period, according to the National Weather Service.

Climate data for Bemidji, Minnesota 1981–2010 Normals, snowfall 1987–2018
Month	Jan	Feb	Mar	Apr	May	Jun	Jul	Aug	Sep	Oct	Nov	Dec	Year
Record high °F (°C)	51 (11)	55 (13)	72 (22)	93 (34)	96 (36)	101 (38)	108 (42)	105 (41)	99 (37)	95 (35)	73 (23)	56 (13)	108 (42)
Mean maximum °F (°C)	34.5 (1.4)	37.4 (3.0)	51.6 (10.9)	72.1 (22.3)	81.2 (27.3)	85.4 (29.7)	90.5 (32.5)	87.6 (30.9)	75.1 (23.9)	71.3 (21.8)	55.7 (13.2)	42.3 (5.7)	90.5 (32.5)
Mean daily maximum °F (°C)	16.3 (−8.7)	22.9 (−5.1)	34.6 (1.4)	50.8 (10.4)	64.5 (18.1)	72.9 (22.7)	77.4 (25.2)	75.2 (24.0)	65.5 (18.6)	51.6 (10.9)	34.4 (1.3)	20.3 (−6.5)	49.0 (9.4)
Daily mean °F (°C)	5.9 (−14.5)	11.2 (−11.6)	24.2 (−4.3)	39.1 (3.9)	53.1 (11.7)	62.6 (17.0)	67.2 (19.6)	64.7 (18.2)	55.1 (12.8)	41.9 (5.5)	26.1 (−3.3)	11.5 (−11.4)	38.6 (3.7)
Mean daily minimum °F (°C)	−4.6 (−20.3)	−0.4 (−18.0)	13.7 (−10.2)	27.4 (−2.6)	41.7 (5.4)	52.3 (11.3)	57.0 (13.9)	54.2 (12.3)	44.7 (7.1)	32.2 (0.1)	17.8 (−7.9)	2.7 (−16.3)	28.4 (−2.0)
Mean minimum °F (°C)	−27.9 (−33.3)	−24.4 (−31.3)	−13.3 (−25.2)	13.6 (−10.2)	28.2 (−2.1)	41.7 (5.4)	45.1 (7.3)	42.4 (5.8)	29.2 (−1.6)	18.8 (−7.3)	−6.4 (−21.3)	−18.9 (−28.3)	−27.9 (−33.3)
Record low °F (°C)	−44 (−42)	−45 (−43)	−35 (−37)	−13 (−25)	11 (−12)	27 (−3)	29 (−2)	30 (−1)	22 (−6)	10 (−12)	−24 (−31)	−50 (−46)	−50 (−46)
Average precipitation inches (mm)	0.73 (19)	0.66 (17)	1.09 (28)	1.78 (45)	3.05 (77)	4.38 (111)	3.95 (100)	3.21 (82)	3.10 (79)	2.54 (65)	1.35 (34)	0.79 (20)	26.63 (677)
Average snowfall inches (cm)	10.7 (27)	7.9 (20)	6.8 (17)	4.8 (12)	0.7 (1.8)	0 (0)	0 (0)	0 (0)	0.1 (0.25)	1.7 (4.3)	6.1 (15)	7.9 (20)	46.7 (117.35)
Source 1: Climatography of the United States
Source 2: XMACIS

== Demographics ==
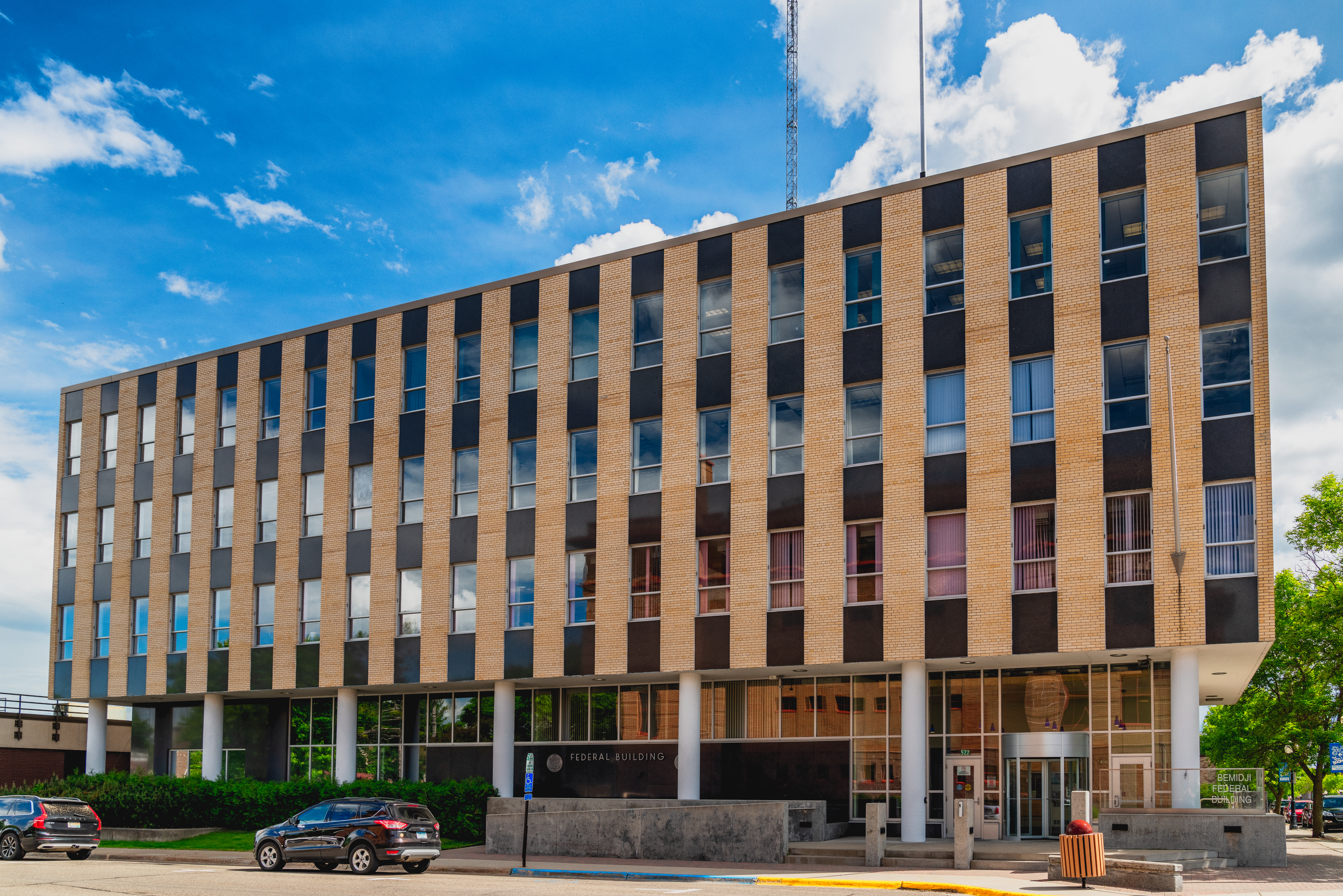
Bemidji Federal Building

Historical population
Census	Pop.	Note	%±
1900	2,183		—
1910	5,099		133.6%
1920	7,086		39.0%
1930	7,202		1.6%
1940	9,427		30.9%
1950	10,001		6.1%
1960	9,958		−0.4%
1970	11,490		15.4%
1980	10,949		−4.7%
1990	11,245		2.7%
2000	11,917		6.0%
2010	13,431		12.7%
2020	14,574		8.5%
2025 (est.)	15,770		8.2%
U.S. Decennial Census; 2020 Census

According to realtor website Zillow, the average price of a home as of June 30, 2026, in Bemidji was $222,500.

As of the 2024 American Community Survey, there were 6,636 estimated households in Bemidji with an average of 2.10 persons per household. The city has a median household income of $55,405. Approximately 21.3% of the city's population lives at or below the poverty line. Bemidji has an estimated 60.6% employment rate, with 32.5% of the population holding a bachelor's degree or higher and 92.2% holding a high school diploma. There were 7,232 housing units at an average density of 414.68 per square mile (160.1/km^{2}).

The top five reported languages (people were allowed to report up to two languages, thus the figures will generally add to more than 100%) were English (94.2%), Spanish (1.4%), Indo-European (0.4%), Asian and Pacific Islander (1.0%), and Other (3.0%).

The median age in the city was 30.0 years.

Bemidji, Minnesota – racial and ethnic composition Note: the US Census treats Hispanic/Latino as an ethnic category. This table excludes Latinos from the racial categories and assigns them to a separate category. Hispanics/Latinos may be of any race.
Race / ethnicity (NH = non-Hispanic)
Race / ethnicity (NH = non-Hispanic)	Population 1990		Population 2000		Population 2010		Population 2020	
Race / ethnicity (NH = non-Hispanic)	Number	Percent	Number	Percent	Number	Percent	Number	Percent
White alone (NH)	9,997	88.90%	9,974	83.70%	10,817	80.54%	10,508	72.10%
Black or African American alone (NH)	58	0.52%	89	0.75%	148	1.10%	393	2.70%
Native American or Alaska Native alone (NH)	997	8.87%	1,343	11.27%	1,462	10.89%	2,024	13.89%
Asian alone (NH)	132	1.17%	131	1.10%	186	1.38%	136	0.93%
Pacific Islander alone (NH)	—	—	3	0.03%	8	0.06%	1	0.01%
Other race alone (NH)	3	0.03%	11	0.09%	7	0.05%	39	0.27%
Mixed race or multiracial (NH)	—	—	230	1.93%	553	4.12%	886	6.08%
Hispanic or Latino (any race)	58	0.52%	136	1.14%	250	1.86%	587	4.03%
Total	11,245	100.00%	11,917	100.00%	13,431	100.00%	14,574	100.00%

=== 2020 census ===
As of the 2020 census, there were 14,574 people and 6,014 households, and 2,669 families residing in the city. The population density was 999.59 inhabitants per square mile (385.9/km^{2}). There were 6,571 housing units at an average density of 450.69 per square mile (174.0/km^{2}). The racial makeup of the city was 73.62% White, 2.82% African American, 14.36% Native American, 0.95% Asian, 0.03% Pacific Islander, 0.84% from some other races and 7.38% from two or more races. Hispanic or Latino people of any race were 4.03% of the population.

There were 6,014 households out of which 22.5% had children under the age of 18 living with them, 26.8% were married couples living together, 38.8% had a female householder with no husband present, and _% were non-families. 43.1% of all households were made up of individuals and 17.0% had someone living alone who was 65 years of age or older. The average household size was 2._ and the average family size was 2._.

In the city the population was spread out with 6.8% were under 5 years of age, 19.6% under the age of 18, _% from 18 to 24, _% from 25 to 44, _% from 45 to 64, and 17.4% who were 65 years of age or older. The median age was 30.9 years. For every 100 females there were 93.3 males. For every 100 females age 18 and over, there were 90.3 males.

The median income for a household in the city was $_, and the median income for a family was $_. Males had a median income of $_ versus $_ for females. The per capita income for the city was $_. _% of the population and _% of families were below the poverty line. Out of the total people living in poverty, _% were under the age of 18 and _% were 65 or older.

95.9% of residents lived in urban areas, while 4.1% lived in rural areas.

24.4% were households with a male householder and no spouse or partner present.

There were 6,571 housing units, of which 8.5% were vacant. The homeowner vacancy rate was 1.4% and the rental vacancy rate was 5.9%.

=== 2010 census ===
As of the 2010 census, there were 13,431 people, 5,339 households, and 2,557 families residing in the city. The population density was 1,039.55 inhabitants per square mile (401.4/km^{2}). There were 5,748 housing units at an average density of 444.89 per square mile (171.8/km^{2}). The racial makeup of the city was 81.33% White, 1.15% African American, 11.34% Native American, 1.39% Asian, 0.06% Pacific Islander, 0.34% from some other races and 4.39% from two or more races. Hispanic or Latino people of any race were 1.86% of the population.

There were 5,339 households, of which 24.9% had children under the age of 18 living with them, 28.7% were married couples living together, 14.4% had a female householder with no husband present, 4.8% had a male householder with no wife present, and 52.1% were non-families. Of all households, 38.6% were made up of individuals, and 16.7% had someone living alone who was 65 years of age or older. The average household size was 2.18 and the average family size was 2.83.

The median age in the city was 27.1 years. 19.4% of residents were under the age of 18; 26.7% were between the ages of 18 and 24; 21.6% were from 25 to 44; 17.5% were from 45 to 64; and 14.8% were 65 years of age or older. The gender makeup of the city was 47.7% male and 52.3% female.

== Economy ==
As of the 2024 US Economic Census, the median household income was $55,405 with the mean household income of $71,996.

Total Households	Estimate	Percent
Less than $10,000	292	4.4%
$10,000 to $14,999	381	5.7%
$15,000 to $24,999	810	12.2%
$25,000 to $34,999	481	7.2%
$35,000 to $49,999	896	13.5%
$50,000 to $74,999	1,466	22.1%
$75,000 to $99,999	814	12.3%
$100,000 to $149,999	900	13.6%
$150,000 to $199,999	312	4.7%
$200,000 or more	284	4.3%

=== Major Employers ===
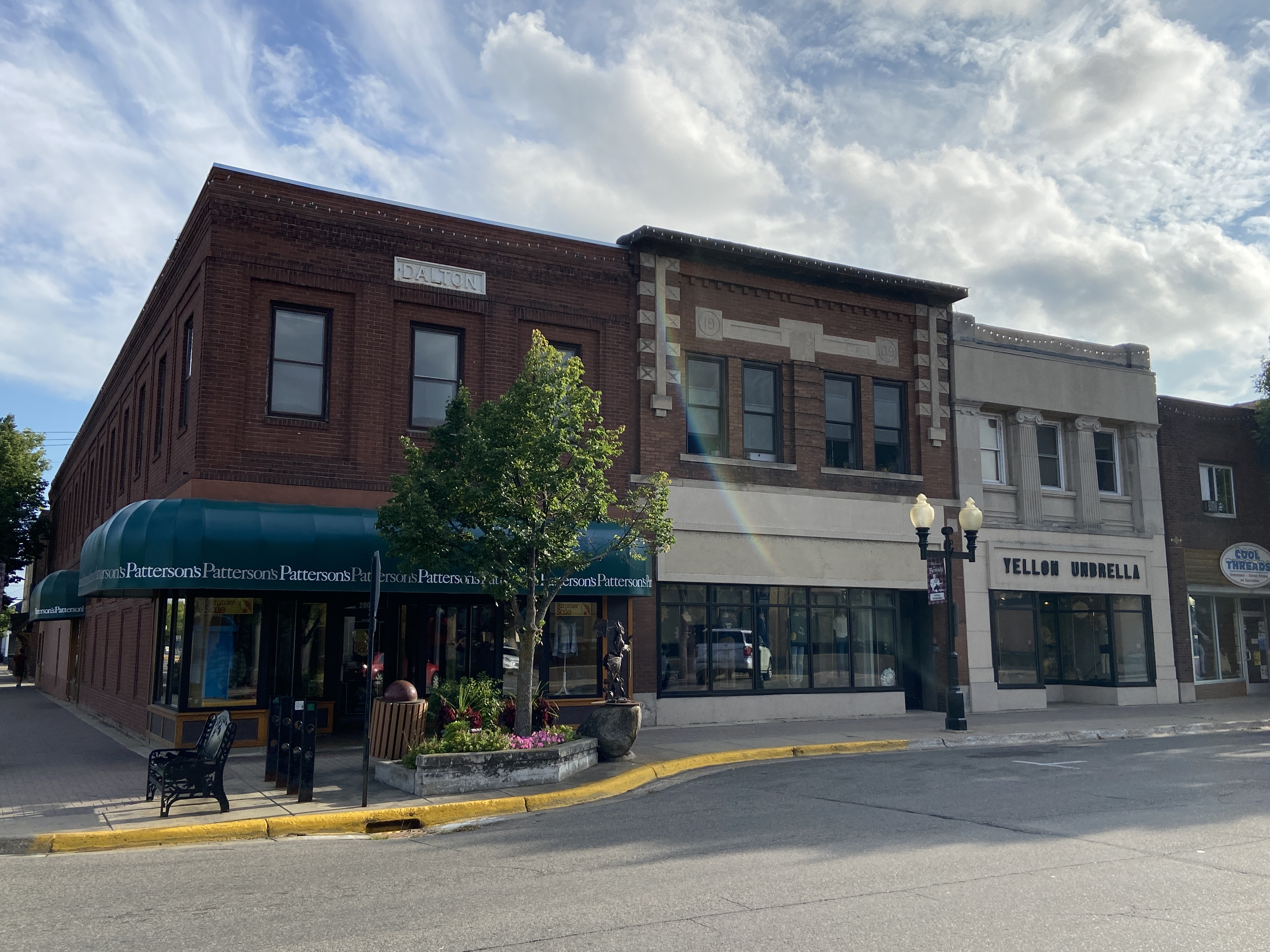
Businesses on Beltrami Avenue

According to the City's 2021 Comprehensive Annual Financial Report, the largest employers in the city are:

#	Employer	# of Employees
1	Sanford Health	2,200
2	Bemidji Public Schools	975
3	Bemidji State University	555
4	Beltrami County	325

=== Industries ===
Bemidji's Top 15 Industries (2022 vs. 2012)
Industries	Number of Employees 2022	Number of Employees 2012	Percent Change
Educational services, and health care and social assistance	5,926	6,891	−14.00%
Retail Trade	2,067	2,669	−22.56%
Arts, entertainment, and recreation, and accommodation and food services	1,682	1,492	12.73%
Public Administration	1,285	n/a	–
Construction	1,274	n/a	–
Professional, scientific, and management, and administrative and waste management services	939	890	5.51%
Manufacturing	877	149	488.59%
Finance and insurance, and real estate and rental and leasing	774	411	88.32%
Transportation and warehousing, and utilities	718	318	125.79%
Other services	696	550	26.55%
Information	361	343	5.25%
Wholesale trade	271	335	−19.10%
Agriculture, forestry, fishing and hunting, and mining	217	n/a	–

These are the top 12 industries in Bemidji of the civilian employed population 16 years and over.

== Government ==
Current Government
Mayor	Jorge Prince
Council Ward 1	Gwenia Fiskevold Gould
Council Ward 2	Josh Peterson
Council Ward 3	Mark Dickinson
Council Ward 4	Emelie Rivera
Council Ward 5	Lynn Eaton
Council at-large	Audrey Thayer

Bemidji's government is made up of a mayor and a council, with the latter elected from five single-member districts or wards.

== Politics ==
Presidential election results

2024 Precinct Results Spreadsheet2020 Precinct Results Spreadsheet2016 Precinct Results Spreadsheet2012 Precinct Results Spreadsheet2008 Precinct Results Spreadsheet2004 Precinct Results Spreadsheet2000 Precinct Results Spreadsheet1996 Precinct Results1992 Precinct Results1988 Precinct Results1984 Precinct Results1980 Precinct Results1976 Precinct Results1968 Precinct Results1964 Precinct Results1960 Precinct Results
Year	Republican	Democratic	Third parties
2024	43.6% 3,187	53.9% 3,942	2.5% 181
2020	43.2% 3,068	53.3% 3,789	3.5% 247
2016	44.7% 2,912	42.9% 2,793	12.4% 805
2012	40.2% 2,708	56.2% 3,787	3.6% 247
2008	39.9% 2,608	57.4% 3,749	2.7% 176
2004	45.8% 2,825	52.3% 3,224	1.9% 118
2000	44.7% 2,344	42.5% 2,229	12.8% 667
1996	34.7% 1,553	55.1% 2,466	10.2% 454
1992	31.8% 1,631	46.1% 2,363	22.1% 1,134
1988	46.0% 2,105	54.0% 2,469	0.0% 0
1984	47.6% 2,411	52.4% 2,649	0.0% 0
1980	35.2% 2,172	48.8% 3,013	16.0% 990
1976	40.6% 2,172	55.8% 2,988	3.6% 194
1968	48.3% 1,629	46.5% 1,570	5.2% 174
1964	38.4% 1,388	61.5% 2,221	0.1% 4
1960	53.9% 2,014	46.0% 1,721	0.1% 3

== Culture ==
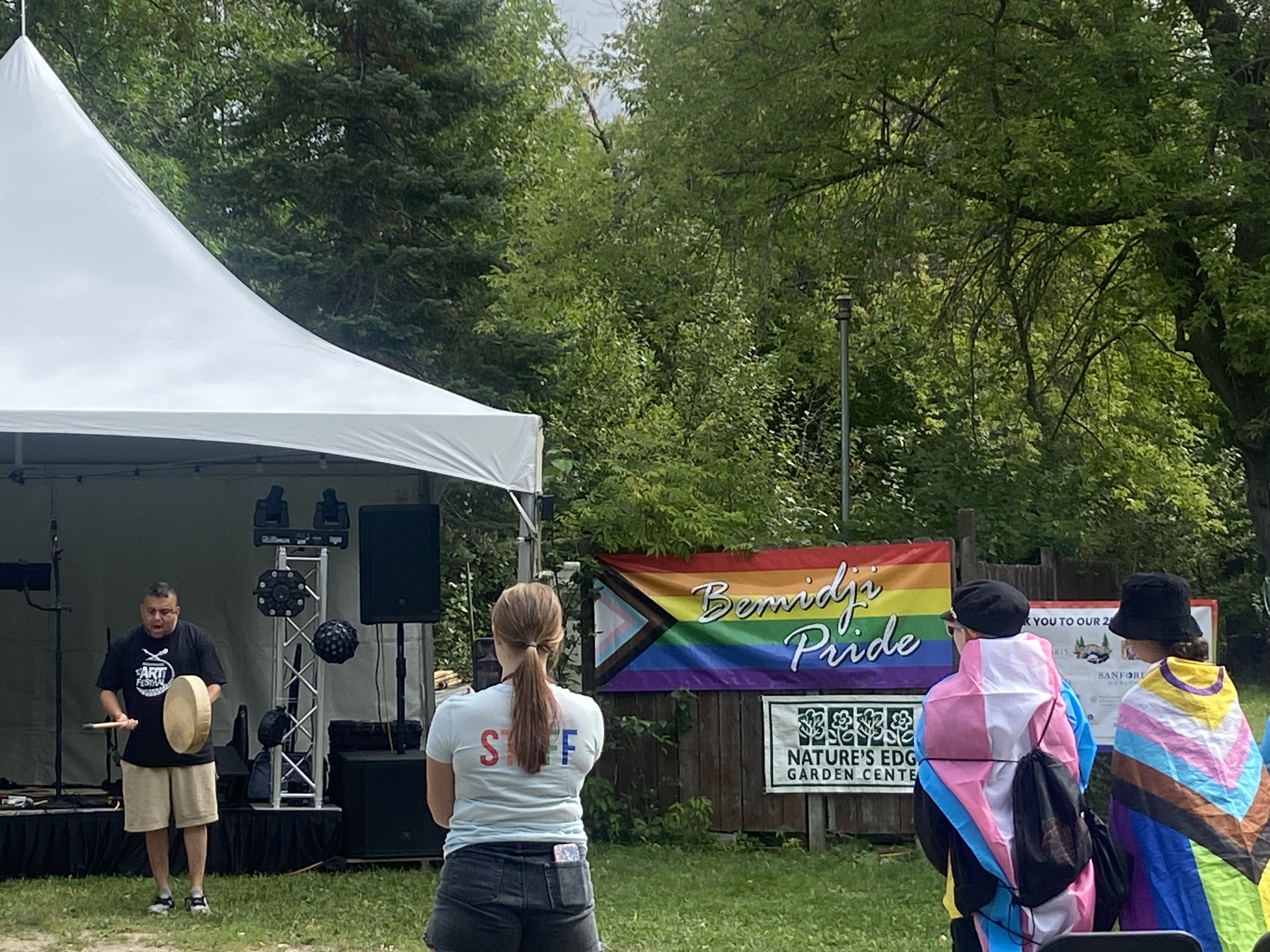
Drum ceremony at Bemidji Pride festival opening

The Concordia Language Villages are near Bemidji. They have supported several language conversational groups (including French, Chinese, Norwegian, Spanish, Italian, and German) that meet weekly in local coffeehouses. In 2018 Concordia's Korean Language Village received a $5 million grant. The Korean village is the newest of the Villages.

In 2011, Chairman Floyd Jourdain Jr., of the Red Lake Ojibwe Nation, complimented Bemidji's Ojibwe language signage in places-of-business.

During the summer, the Paul Bunyan Playhouse operates a non-Equity, summer stock theater at the Chief Theater. The Bemidji Community Theatre provides live theatre there when the Paul Bunyan Playhouse is not in operation. Bemidji is also home to the Bemidji Symphony Orchestra (BSO), which was established in 1938 under the auspices of (what was then) Bemidji State College. In 2000, the BSO became an independent arts organization.

The statues of Paul Bunyan and Babe the Blue Ox are popular tourist destinations, and people photograph themselves in front of them. The statues are next to the Bemidji Tourist Information Center, where tourists can learn about local activities, events, and attractions. The center also includes many artifacts of the lumberjack's legend and a giant visitors' book in which travelers can sign their names; the list of signatures goes back decades. An old fireplace there was built with 900 stones, the stones having been taken from every state in the United States, most of the Canadian provinces, and Minnesota national parks.

== Sports ==
The city is well-known to hockey fans. As a Division II team, Bemidji State was a hockey dynasty in the 1980s and '90s. Bemidji State was in the title game eight straight years, winning five titles. It became a Division I team in 1999, and has not won any Division I titles.

The city is also familiar to curling fans. Both men's and women's rinks from the Bemidji Curling Club won the right to represent the United States in the 2005 World Curling Championship and the 2006 Winter Olympics in Torino, Italy. Pete Fenson, the skip of the U.S. curling team that took the bronze medal at the 2006 Olympics, is a native of Bemidji, as is Natalie Nicholson, who was the lead for the United States women's team at the 2010 Winter Olympics in Vancouver.

A city referendum for a Bemidji Regional Events Center passed by a slim majority of 43 votes out of 4,583 cast in November 2006. Opening in 2010, the center was renamed the Sanford Center and serves as home to the Bemidji State University hockey team. The men's and women's hockey teams are both members of the Western Collegiate Hockey Association. From 2014 to 2015, the Sanford Center was the home of the city's first-ever professional sports team, the Bemidji Axemen of the Indoor Football League.

From January 16 to January 19, 2019, Bemidji hosted Hockey Day Minnesota, a three-day event aired on Fox Sports. The Bemidji High School and Bemidji State University boys and girls hockey teams both played on outdoor rinks outside of the Sanford Center. The Minnesota Wild team also played on the outdoor rinks.

In 2013, runners signed up for the first Bemidji Blue Ox Marathon. The race, run in October, draws athletes and recreational runners from around the region. The events spawned a weekend of races that includes two kids races, a 5K, 10K, half-marathon and a 26K that circles Lake Bemidji.

== Education ==
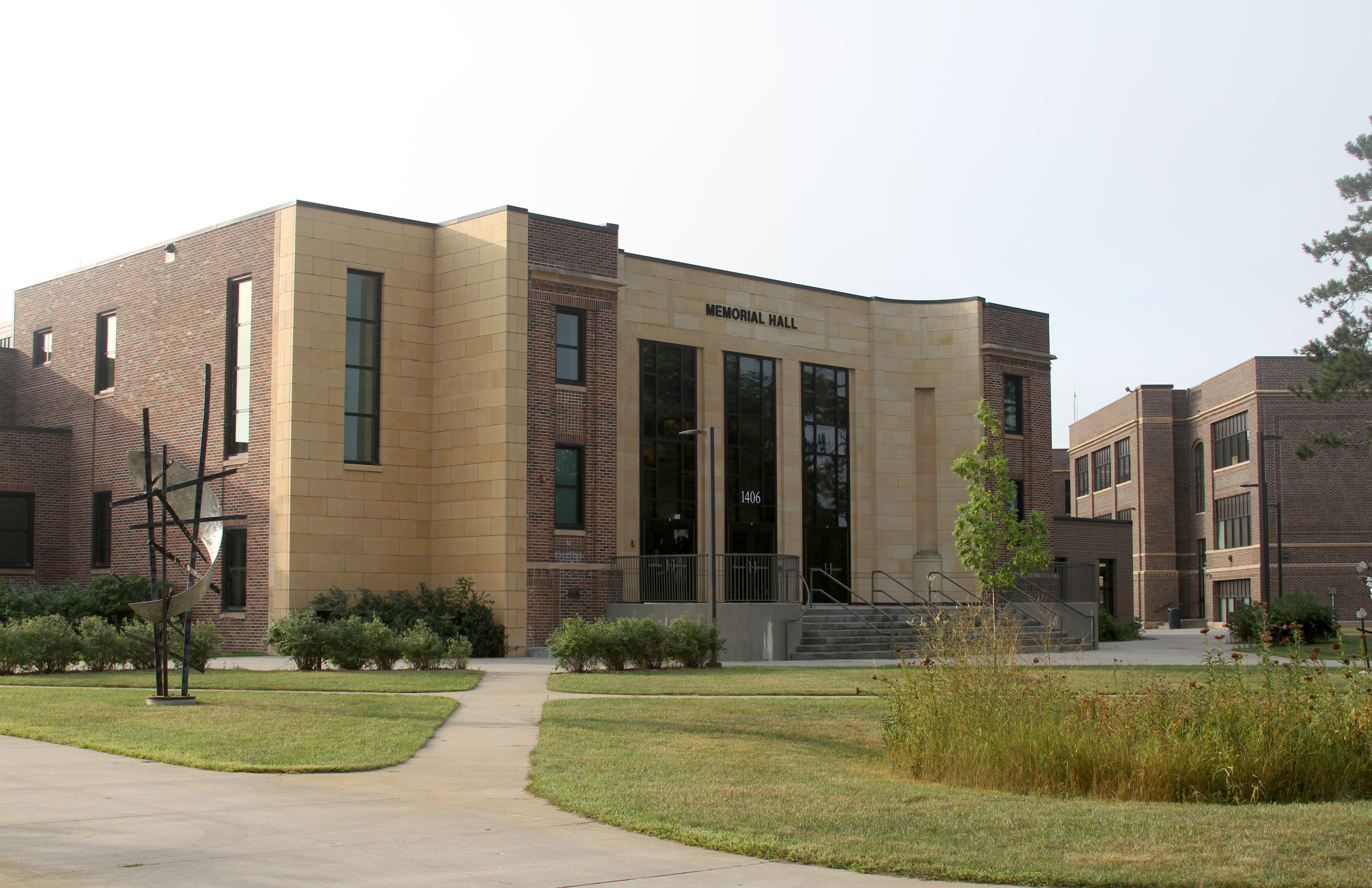
Memorial Hall, Bemidji State University

Bemidji is home to Bemidji State University, Northwest Technical College, and Oak Hills Christian College. Public education, served by Bemidji Area Schools, is a part of Independent School District 31, and includes eight elementary schools, a middle school, and a high school. Also in the district are TrekNorth Charter Jr. and Sr. High School, Voyagers Expeditionary School, Schoolcraft Charter School, and Bemidji is home to four private schools: St. Philip's Catholic School, St. Mark's Lutheran School, Kingdom Builders and Heartland Christian Academy.

== Regional center ==
Bemidji is a regional hub for shopping, arts, entertainment, education, health services, worship, government services and more. The Bemidji area includes parts or all of Beltrami (pop. 46,380), Hubbard (pop. 21,715), Cass (pop. 30,639), Itasca (pop. 45,070), Koochiching (pop. 11,941), Lake of the Woods (pop. 3,823), Marshall (pop. 8,988), Pennington (pop. 13,780), Red Lake (pop. 3,933), Clearwater (pop. 8,576), and Mahnomen (pop. 5,414) counties, the White Earth (pop. 9,726) and Leech Lake (pop. 11,388) Reservations and the Sovereign Nation of Red Lake (pop. 5,506). Lexington Realty International places the Bemidji Area population at 200,259 in the 2021 Estimate.

== Media ==
=== Newspapers ===
The Bemidji Pioneer is the local newspaper, published twice weekly on Wednesday and Saturday. Now owned by Forum Communications Company, it was founded as a weekly in 1896.

=== TV stations ===
Most of Bemidji's TV stations primarily rebroadcast the television stations of the Twin Cities.

Channel	Callsign	Affiliation	Branding	Subchannels		Owner
(Virtual)	Callsign	Affiliation	Branding	Channel	Programming	Owner
9.1	KAWE	PBS	Lakeland PBS	9.2; 9.3; 9.4; 9.5; 9.6	First Nations Experience; PBS Kids; Create; PBS Encore; Minnesota Channel	Northern Minnesota Public Television, Inc.
11.1	K20MN-D (KRII Translator)	NBC	KBJR 6	11.2; 11.3	CBS; H&I/MyNetworkTV	Red Lake Band of Chippewa Indians
12.1	KCCW (WCCO-TV Satellite)	CBS	WCCO 4	12.2; 12.3; 12.4; 12.5	Start TV; Dabl; Fave TV; Nosey	CBS Corporation
13.1	K24MM-D (WIRT Translator)	ABC	WDIO	13.2; 13.3; 13.4; 13.5; 13.6	MeTV; Ion Television; Ion Plus; Grit; Ion Mystery	Red Lake Band of Chippewa Indians
19.1	K32MF-D (WGN-TV Translator)	The CW	WGN 9			Red Lake Band of Chippewa Indians
22.1	KAWB	PBS	Lakeland PBS	22.2; 22.3; 22.4; 22.5; 22.6	First Nations Experience; PBS Kids; Create; PBS Encore; Minnesota Channel	Northern Minnesota Public Television, Inc.
26.1	KFTC (WFTC Satellite)	FOX	FOX 9	26.2; 26.3; 26.4	MyNetworkTV; Movies! Fox Weather	Fox Television Stations, Inc.

=== Radio stations ===
==== FM ====
FM radio stations
Frequency	Call sign	Name	Format	Owner
88.5 FM	KCRB	Classical MPR	Classical music	Minnesota Public Radio
89.7 FM	KBSB	FM 90	College radio/Top 40 (CHR)	Bemidji State University
90.5 FM	KBXE	Northern Community Radio	Music, local news & arts, National Public Radio	Northern Community Radio
91.3 FM	KNBJ	MPR News	NPR	Minnesota Public Radio
92.1 FM	WMIS-FM	The River 92.1	Adult Hits	Paskvan Media
92.7 FM	W224AB (KBHW Translator)	Psalm 99:5	Christian	Oak Hills Fellowship
93.5 FM	K228EW (KOPJ Translator)	LifeTalk Radio	Christian	Seventh-day Adventist Church
94.3 FM	W232DS (KPMI Translator)	The Legends	Classic Country	Paskvan Media
94.9 FM	K235BP (KBUN (AM) Translator)	The Bun	Sports	Hubbard Broadcasting
95.5 FM	KKZY	KZY 95.5	Adult contemporary	Hubbard Broadcasting
96.7 FM	KKCQ-FM	Q Country	Country	R&J Broadcasting, Inc
98.3 FM	WBJI-FM	Babe Country 98.3	Country	RP Broadcasting
99.1 FM	KLLZ-FM	Z99	Classic rock	Hubbard Broadcasting
101.1 FM	KBHP	KB101	Country	Hubbard Broadcasting
102.5 FM	KKWB	Coyote 102.5	Country	De La Hunt Broadcasting
103.1 FM	K276EP (KKWB Translator)	Coyote 102.5	Country	De La Hunt Broadcasting
103.7 FM	KKBJ-FM	Mix 103.7	Hot AC	RP Broadcasting
104.5 FM	KBUN-FM		Sports	Hubbard Broadcasting
105.3 FM	K287AD (KOJB Translator)		Community radio	Leech Lake Band of Ojibwe
107.1 FM	KKEQ	Your Q FM	Contemporary Christian music	Pine to Prairie Broadcasting

==== AM ====
AM radio stations
Frequency	Call sign	Name	Format	Owner
820 AM	WBKK	AM 820	Catholic Talk	Real Presence Radio
1300 AM	KPMI	County Legends	Classic Country	Paskvan Media
1360 AM	KKBJ	Talkradio 1360	News/Talk	RP Broadcasting
1450 AM	KBUN	The Bun	Sports (KFAN/ESPN programming)	Hubbard Broadcasting

=== Magazines ===
- inBemidji, a quarterly lifestyle magazine focused on the Bemidji area. First published in December 2013 (as inMagazine) by The Bemidji Pioneer.
- Northwoods Woman, a bimonthly magazine published from 2008 to 2013, launched in Bemidji, Walker and Park Rapids, included articles about women who live and work in northern Minnesota.

== Infrastructure ==
=== Major highways ===
The following routes are in the Bemidji area.

- U.S. Highway 2
- U.S. Highway 71
- Minnesota State Highway 89
- Minnesota State Highway 197

=== Air service ===
Bemidji is served by Bemidji Regional Airport, which has passenger services on three airlines, Delta Connection, Sun Country Airlines and Bemidji Airlines, the latter of which is based in Bemidji. Bemidji Airlines also operates cargo flights, while Corporate Air is the only airline to operate all-cargo-only flights to the airport, on behalf of FedEx Express.

== Notable people ==
- Rita Albrecht, public servant and Bemidji mayor (2012–2020)
- Russell A. Anderson, Chief Justice of the Minnesota Supreme Court
- Elmer E. Berglund, Minnesota state representative and railroad conductor
- Roy C. Booth, author
- Harry A. Bridgeman, Minnesota state senator and railroad locomotive engineer
- Gary Burger, guitarist and lead vocalist for the band The Monks
- Dave Casper, football player
- Bob Decker, Minnesota state senator and educator
- Leonard R. Dickinson, Minnesota state legislator and businessman
- Pete Fenson, American curling skip
- Terry Frost, actor
- Bryan Hickerson, baseball player
- Bob Johnson, Minnesota state representative
- Frank Moe, Minnesota state representative
- Joe Motzko, hockey player
- Kent Nerburn, author
- Brian Paulson, record producer and musician
- Mimi Parker, drummer and vocalist for Low
- Jane Russell, actress
- Gary Sargent, ice hockey defenseman
- Gail Skare, Minnesota state representative
- Kerry Taylor, baseball player
- Theodore W. Thorson, Minnesota state representative
- David Tomassoni, Minnesota state legislator
- Will Weaver, author and Professor Emeritus

== In popular culture ==
- The first season of the FX black comedy crime drama television series Fargo, starring Billy Bob Thornton, Allison Tolman, Colin Hanks and Martin Freeman, is mainly set in and around Bemidji and Duluth. It was filmed in Calgary, Alberta.
