= KBHP =

Coordinates: 47.370°N 94.882°W

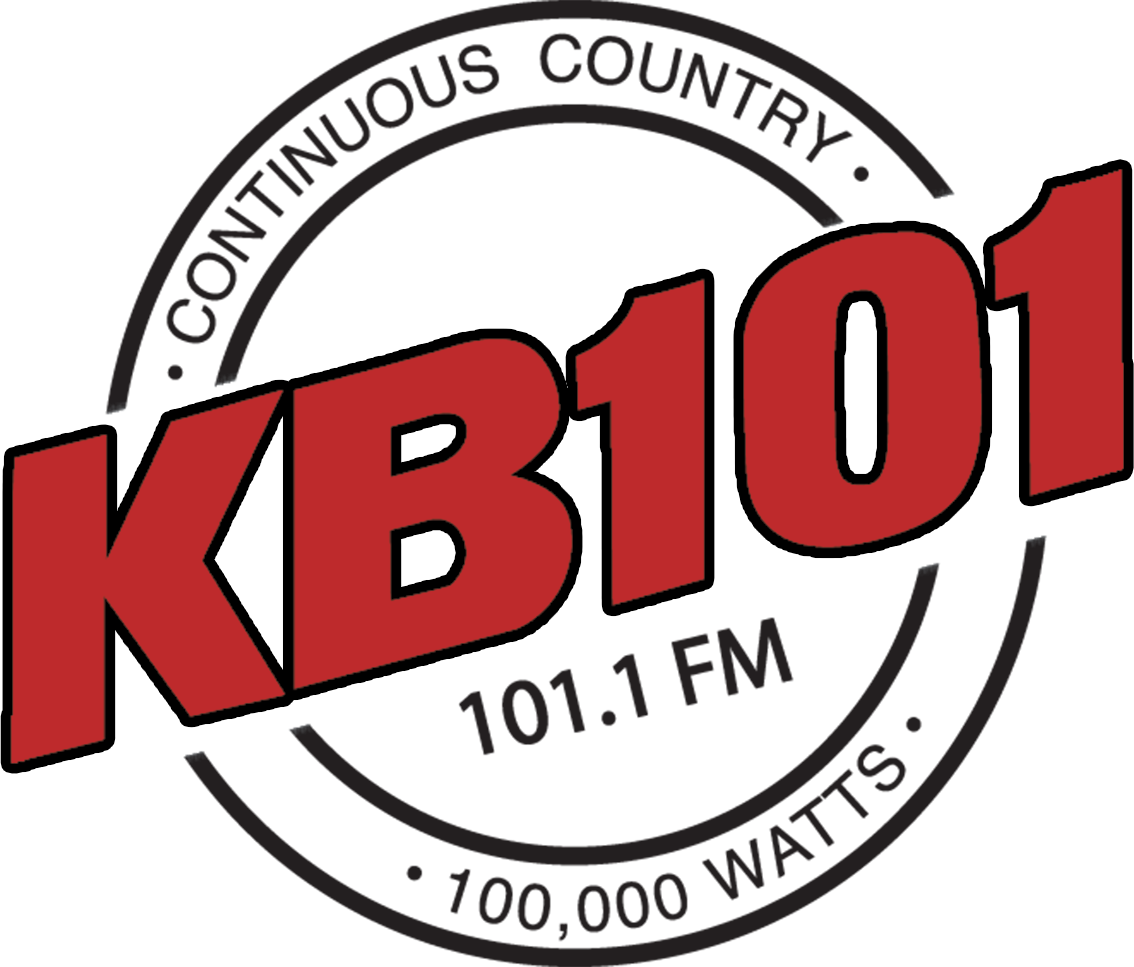
- Bemidji, Minnesota; United States
- Frequency: 101.1 MHz
- Branding: KB101

Programming
- Format: Country
- Affiliations: ABC News Radio; Minnesota News Network; Westwood One

Ownership
- Owner: Hubbard Broadcasting, Inc.; (HBI Radio Bemidji, LLC)
- Sister stations: KBUN; KBUN-FM; KLLZ-FM; KKZY

History
- First air date: 1972

Technical information
- Licensing authority: FCC
- Facility ID: 51878
- Class: C1
- ERP: 100,000 watts
- HAAT: 159 meters (522 ft)

Links
- Public license information: Public file; LMS
- Webcast: Listen live
- Website: www.kb101fm.com

KBHP (101.1 FM, "KB101") is a radio station licensed by the Federal Communications Commission (FCC) to serve the community of Bemidji, Minnesota, which is located in northwestern Minnesota. KBHP plays country music and is owned and operated by Hubbard Broadcasting, Inc. It has its own local news department, and gets statewide news from the Minnesota News Network. The Bemidji studios are located at 502 Beltrami Avenue, downtown Bemidji. It shares a transmitter site with sisters KLLZ-FM and KKZY, near Lake Plantagenet along Highway 9.

KBHP is the local home to the Minnesota Vikings broadcasts, along with its sister station KBUN. A large amount of the broadcasting day is live, from 5:30 am until 10pm each week day.

== History ==
KBHP signed on the air in August 1972. The call letters are the initials of the name of a former owner of the station, Ben H. Potter Jr.

In 1989, KBHP and its sibling AM station, KBUN, were acquired by Louis H. Buron Jr., who formed Omni Broadcasting as the umbrella company for his radio stations.

Hubbard Broadcasting announced on November 13, 2014, that it would purchase the Omni Broadcasting stations, including KBHP. The sale was completed on February 27, 2015, at a purchase price of $8 million for the 16 stations and one translator.

== Awards ==
KBHP won the National Association of Broadcasters' Crystal Award five times, in 1994, 1997, 1999, 2007, and 2010.

In 2011, in recognition of its long-term commitment to community service, KBHP was awarded the NAB's Crystal Heritage Award, only the second broadcast station to have been thus honored, from the time of the award's inception in 2008.
