= KOJB =

- Cass Lake, Minnesota; United States
- Broadcast area: Leech Lake Indian Reservation
- Frequency: 90.1 MHz
- Branding: The Eagle

Programming
- Format: Community radio
- Affiliations: AMPERS

Ownership
- Owner: Leech Lake Band of Ojibwe

History
- First air date: 2009
- Call sign meaning: Ojibwe

Technical information
- Licensing authority: FCC
- Facility ID: 173472
- Class: C2
- ERP: 18,000 watts
- HAAT: 140 meters (460 ft)
- Transmitter coordinates: 47°20′04″N 94°12′43″W
- Translator: 107.9 K300EA (Bemidji)

Links
- Public license information: Public file; LMS
- Webcast: Listen live
- Website: kojb.org

KOJB (90.1 FM) is a Community radio station, owned and operated by the Leech Lake Band of Ojibwe. Licensed to Cass Lake, Minnesota, the station serves the Leech Lake Indian Reservation.

== See also ==
- List of community radio stations in the United States
