= KNSP =

- Staples, Minnesota; United States
- Frequency: 1430 kHz
- Branding: 98.5 The Fan

Programming
- Format: Sports
- Affiliations: The FAN Radio Network; Fox Sports Radio

Ownership
- Owner: Hubbard Broadcasting, Inc.; (HBI Radio Brainerd/Wadena, LLC)
- Sister stations: KKWS, KWAD

History
- First air date: June 3, 1982
- Call sign meaning: Staples

Technical information
- Licensing authority: FCC
- Facility ID: 30016
- Class: D
- Power: 1,000 watts day; 199 watts night
- Transmitter coordinates: 46°21′34″N 94°46′55″W
- Translator: 98.5 K253CK (Staples)

Links
- Public license information: Public file; LMS
- Website: www.thefanam1430.com

KNSP (1430 AM) is a radio station broadcasting a sports format. Licensed to Staples, Minnesota, United States, the station is owned by Hubbard Broadcasting, Inc., through licensee HBI Radio Brainerd/Wadena, LLC. The KNSP signal is rebroadcast in the FM band on 98.5 MHz by co-owned Translator Station K253CK.

KNSP's programming is primarily supplied by the Fan Radio Network, based out of KFXN-FM in Minneapolis–St. Paul; evening and overnight programming comes from Fox Sports Radio. Prior to 2017, KNSP simulcast classic country from Wadena sister station KWAD for about a quarter-century.

== Ownership change ==
Hubbard Broadcasting announced on November 13, 2014, that it would purchase the Omni Broadcasting stations, including KNSP. The sale was completed on February 27, 2015, at a purchase price of $8 million for the 16 stations and one translator.
