= KKZY =

Coordinates: 47.370°N 94.882°W

- Bemidji, Minnesota; United States
- Frequency: 95.5 MHz
- Branding: KZY-FM 95.5

Programming
- Format: Hot adult contemporary
- Affiliations: Compass Media Networks; Westwood One

Ownership
- Owner: Hubbard Broadcasting, Inc.; (HBI Radio Bemidji, LLC)
- Sister stations: KBHP, KBUN, KBUN-FM, KLLZ-FM

History
- First air date: 1999

Technical information
- Licensing authority: FCC
- Facility ID: 77087
- Class: C1
- ERP: 100,000 watts
- HAAT: 129 meters

Links
- Public license information: Public file; LMS
- Webcast: Listen Live
- Website: kzyfm955.com

KKZY (95.5 FM) is a radio station based in Bemidji, Minnesota, United States and airs a hot adult contemporary music format. It is owned by Hubbard Broadcasting, Inc.

The Bemidji studios are located at 502 Beltrami Avenue, downtown Bemidji. It shares a transmitter site with KBHP, near Lake Plantagenet along Highway 9.

KKZY began broadcasting on May 7, 1999, under the ownership of Omni Broadcasting.

Hubbard Broadcasting announced on November 13, 2014, that it would purchase the Omni Broadcasting stations, including KKZY. The sale was completed on February 27, 2015, at a purchase price of $8 million for the 16 stations and one translator.
