= Harry A. Bridgeman =

American politician (1877–1955)

Harry Bridgeman

Member of the Minnesota Senate from the 62nd district
- In office 1929–1950

Personal details
- Born: May 31, 1877 Motley, Minnesota, U.S.
- Died: May 15, 1955 (aged 77) Saint Paul, Minnesota, U.S.
- Party: Independent
- Children: 5

Harry A. Bridgeman Sr. (May 31, 1877 – May 15, 1955) was an American locomotive engineer and politician.

== Early life ==
Bridgeman was born near Motley, Minnesota, and attended Minnesota public schools.

== Career ==
Outside of politics, Bridgeman worked as a locomotive engineer for Minnesota and International Railway. Bridgeman served on the Bemidji City Council for two years. He then served in the Minnesota Senate from 1929 to 1950.

== Personal life ==
Bridgeman lived in Bemidji, Minnesota, with his wife and family. He moved to Hot Springs, Arkansas, in 1951. Bridgeman died at the Northern Pacific Railroad Hospital in Saint Paul, Minnesota.
