= KPMI-FM =

Radio station in Baudette, Minnesota

- Baudette, Minnesota; United States
- Frequency: 94.5 MHz
- Branding: 94.5 The River

Programming
- Format: Classic rock

Ownership
- Owner: Paskvan Media, Inc.
- Sister stations: KPMI

History
- First air date: Spring 2019

Technical information
- Licensing authority: FCC
- Facility ID: 190437
- Class: A
- ERP: 3,000 watts
- HAAT: 62 meters (203 ft)

Links
- Public license information: Public file; LMS
- Webcast: Listen Live
- Website: kpmifm.com

KPMI-FM (94.5 FM, "The River") is a radio station licensed to serve the community of Baudette, Minnesota. The station is owned by Paskvan Media, Inc. It airs a classic rock format. The station started as a construction permit with 100,000 watts of power, however downgraded to 3,000 watts before signing on. The station could potentially upgrade to 100,000 watts in the future. Paskvan Media owns several stations in Bemidji, Minnesota.
