= KKBJ (AM) =

Coordinates: 47°26′32″N 94°51′57″W

- Bemidji, Minnesota; United States
- Frequency: 1360 kHz
- Branding: Talkradio 106.3 & 1360 KKBJ

Programming
- Format: Commercial; Talk
- Affiliations: Fox News Radio; Compass Media Networks; Premiere Networks

Ownership
- Owner: RP Broadcasting
- Sister stations: KKBJ-FM, WBJI, WMIS-FM

History
- Call sign meaning: BemidJi

Technical information
- Licensing authority: FCC
- Facility ID: 9665
- Class: B
- Power: 5,000 watts (day); 2,500 watts (night)
- Translator: 106.3 K292HK (Bemidji)

Links
- Public license information: Public file; LMS
- Webcast: Listen Live
- Website: kkbjam.com

KKBJ (1360 MHz), known as "Talkradio 106.3 & 1360", is an AM radio station based in Bemidji, Minnesota, that airs a talk format. It is owned by RP Broadcasting. The programming is a mixture of local and syndicated talk shows.

Along with the station's normally scheduled programs, "Talkradio 1360" also plays the Bemidji State University Women's Hockey and Basketball and Nationwide Series Racing shows. They also play church services from local churches on the radio every Sunday morning.
