= KBUN-FM =

Coordinates: 47.557°N 94.801°W

- Blackduck, Minnesota; United States
- Broadcast area: Bemidji, Minnesota
- Frequency: 104.5 MHz
- Branding: Sports Radio FM 104.5 The Fan

Programming
- Format: Sports
- Affiliations: FAN Radio Network

Ownership
- Owner: Hubbard Broadcasting, Inc.; (HBI Radio Bemidji, LLC)
- Sister stations: KBUN; KBHP; KLLZ-FM; KKZY

History
- First air date: May 1, 2008 (as WQXJ)
- Former call signs: KSCK (2007–2008); WQXJ (2008–2015)

Technical information
- Licensing authority: FCC
- Facility ID: 165994
- Class: C3
- ERP: 8,500 watts
- HAAT: 148 meters (486 ft)

Links
- Public license information: Public file; LMS
- Website: www.kbunsportsradio.com

KBUN-FM (104.5 FM, "Sports Radio FM 104.5 The Fan") is a sports radio station based in Bemidji, Minnesota, licensed to nearby Blackduck, Minnesota. It is owned by Hubbard Broadcasting, Inc. The Bemidji studios are located at 502 Beltrami Avenue, downtown Bemidji. The transmitter site is north of Lake Bemidji on Sumac Road.

The station signed on May 1, 2008, as WQXJ, the newest station in Omni Broadcasting's Paul Bunyan Broadcasting group. Originally, it was an affiliate of The True Oldies Channel. It later derived most of its programming from Westwood One's Classic Hits.

KBUN-FM is the local home to the Minnesota Twins broadcasts, along with its sister station KBUN.

Hubbard Broadcasting announced on November 13, 2014, that it would purchase the Omni Broadcasting stations, including WQXJ. The sale was completed on February 27, 2015, at a purchase price of $8 million for the 16 stations and one translator.

On October 26, 2015, WQXJ changed its program format to sports, branded as "Sports Radio FM 104.5 The Fan" under new call letters, KBUN-FM.
