= Kent Nerburn =

American author (born 1946)

Kent Michael Nerburn (born July 3, 1946 in Minneapolis, Minnesota) is an American author. He has published 16 books of creative non-fiction and essays, focusing on Native American and American culture and general spirituality. He won a Minnesota Book Award in 1995 for Neither Wolf Nor Dog and again in 2010 for The Wolf At Twilight. The Girl who Sang to the Buffalo, is the final book in this trilogy.

Nerburn describes his work as a search for “an authentic American spirituality.” He has been described as having a “poetry of thought”, as someone who reveals the “profound impact of nature and ‘place’ on the human spirit”, and as someone who displays “integrity and honesty in presenting the experience of native elders today.” He has been praised by Harper Collins publishers as “one of the few American writers who can respectfully bridge the gap between Native and non-Native cultures.”

== Early years ==
Nerburn was born in Minneapolis, Minnesota, the son of Lloyd Nerburn and Virginia (nee Crofoot). Lloyd Nerburn worked for the American Red Cross as director of disaster relief for the Midwest region.

Nerburn attended the University of Minnesota and graduated summa cum laude in 1968 with a degree in American Studies. He attended graduate school at Stanford University from 1969-1970 and later Graduate Theological Union and the University of California, Berkeley. He graduated with a Ph.D. with distinction in religion and art in 1980.

== Work ==
Nerburn initially worked as a sculptor, focusing on over life size works carved from single tree trunks in order to “get the spirit of the tree” in the images he created. His sculpture "Joseph the Worker" completed while he was living in the Westminster Benedictine Abbey in Mission, British Columbia His sculpture "Mother and Child" was donated to the Hiroshima Peace Museum in Hiroshima, Japan. In 1990, he was commissioned by the Hennepin County Humane Society to create a bronze figure of St. Francis and the animals. That sculpture was installed in the society's headquarters in Golden Valley, Minnesota.

Between 1988 and 1990, Nerburn founded and directed "Project Preserve" an oral history project on the Red Lake Ojibwe reservation in northern Minnesota. He and students from Red Lake high school published two books of oral history: To Walk the Red Road and We Choose To Remember. This experience caused him to redirect his artistic focus from sculpture to writing.

Nerburn’s book Neither Wolf Nor Dog was chosen as the Community Reads book for the “Eden Prairie Reads” campaign in 2004, a program that encouraged everyone in this Minneapolis suburb to read the book and discuss it in various venues. Neither Wolf nor Dog was also chosen as the common reads book for Winona State University freshmen in 2007, where it engendered controversy for its combining of traditional storytelling and oral history techniques under the designation of non-fiction. It has since become a staple of Common Reads programs, including being chosen as the 2019 One Book South Dakota selection by the South Dakota Humanities Commission to be read and discussed in communities throughout the state to foster discussions about race and cultural understanding. His subsequent work, The Wolf at Twilight, was used as the common reads book for incoming freshmen at Gustavus Adolphus College in St. Peter, Minnesota. His work, Chief Joseph and the Flight of the Nez Perce, was featured on C-SPAN and the History Channel in 2005. Nerburn was featured on the PBS program, Religion & Ethics, in 2014,” Watch. A one-hour program on Nerburn and his work, Sculpting in Wood and Words was created by Northern Minnesota Public Television in 2013.

Nerburn’s friendship with the singer Robert Plant resulted in Neither Wolf nor Dog being picked up for European publication by prestigious UK publisher, Canongate. He and Plant, along with novelist and critic Andrew O’Hagan spoke together about the book at the Hay Literary Festival in Wales in 2017. Neither Wolf nor Dog was also adapted into a highly successful independent film of the same name, starring 97 year old Lakota elder, Dave Bald Eagle, in the last performance of his career.

Nerburn’s works on general spirituality have included Simple Truths, Small Graces, and Make Me an Instrument of Your Peace, which included a story about Nerburn’s time driving a cab in Minneapolis in the late 80s. It received over 4 million internet hits and was purchased by New Line Cinema for adaptation into a motion picture. His work, Letters to My Son (re-released in 2013), was quoted by British Prime Minister David Cameron during his father’s day address to the nation in 2011.

Nerburn recently published Dancing with the Gods: Reflections on Life and Art, which was reissued for the American market under the title, The Artist's Journey: On Making Art and Being an Artist. It contains Nerburn's thoughts on the joys and challenges of a life in the arts. Daniel Pink called it “a powerful and deeply moving meditation on what it means to live the life of the artist.” Twitter founder Jack Dorsey distributed it to his primary cultural influencers and it has been cited by producer, Rick Rubin and author Margaret Atwood. He has also released Native Echoes: Listening to the Spirit of the Land, a work that he calls his “quiet, poetic literary child” that uses storytelling and metaphor to address the link between the land, Native American understanding, and the western Judeo Christian spiritual tradition. Literary Journalism Studies has said that it “bridges Native and non-Native . . . cultures in eloquent prose that invites comparison to Anne Lamott and Annie Dillard” and makes his work “a compelling addition to the canon of literary nonfiction.” He also published Voices in the Stones: Life Lessons from the Native way in an effort to explicate what his experiences in Native America have taught him about how contemporary culture could benefit from insights into the Native way of life.

== Personal life ==
Nerburn married Louise Mengelkoch in 1989. Mengelkoch is a retired journalism professor, who taught at Bemidji State University in Minnesota for 24 years. They have one son (Nicholas Kent Nerburn), and they helped raise Mengelkoch's other three children (Stephanie, Alexandra and Creighton Penn). They now live outside of Portland, Oregon after 25 years in the woods and lake country of northern Minnesota.

== Bibliography ==
- To Walk the Red Road: Memories of the Red Lake Ojibwe People (May 1989)
- We Choose to Remember: More Memories of the Red Lake Ojibwe People (May 1990)
- Native American Wisdom (Classic Wisdom Collections) with Louise Mengelkoch (January 1, 1993)
- Neither Wolf nor Dog: On Forgotten Roads with an Indian Elder (1994)
- North Writers II: Burial (May 1997)
- Small Graces: The Quiet Gifts of Everyday Life (March 16, 1998)
- A Haunting Reverence: Meditations on a Northern Land (October 1, 1996)
- The Wisdom of the Native Americans (March 3, 1999)
- Make Me an Instrument of Your Peace (April 21, 1999)
- The Soul of an Indian 2 Ed: And Other Writings from Ohiyesa (Charles Alexander Eastman) (September 9, 2001)
- Calm Surrender: Walking the Path of Forgiveness (March 11, 2002)
- Letters to My Son: A Father's Wisdom on Manhood, Life, and Love with Richard Carlson (February 1, 1993)
- Simple Truths : Clear and Gentle Guidance on the Big Issues in Life (August 15, 2005)
- Chief Joseph & the Flight of the Nez Perce: The Untold Story of an American Tragedy (October 25, 2005)
- The Wolf at Twilight: An Indian Elder's Journey through a Land of Ghosts and Shadows (November 3, 2009)
- Ordinary Sacred: The Simple Beauty of Everyday Life (February 14, 2012)
- The Girl who Sang to the Buffalo (November 5, 2013)
- Voices in the Stones (November 28, 2016)
- Native Echoes: Listening to the Spirit of the Land(May 2016)
- Dancing with the Gods: Reflections on Life and Art (June 2018)

== Reviews ==
- Di Nanni, Tom, "Writer shares his spiritual journey," Star Tribune (Minneapolis), July 14, 2001, B6. (review of Road Angels)
- Dunavan, Naomi,Take this journey into peace: It's not an easy feat, but give yourself over to a quiet voice, author Kent Nerburn urges." April 23, 2000
- Grossman, Mary Ann, "Forgiven: Minnesota author Ken (sic) Nerburn takes on the thorny topic of absolution and surrenders himself to the quest,"
- Grossman, Mary Ann, "Nerburn’s latest Native American tale a heartbreaker," St. Paul Pioneer Press, Nov. 3, 2009, C1. (review of The Wolf at Twilight)
- Heffern, Rich, "The long retreat of the Nez Perce," National Catholic Reporter, Feb. 24, 2006.
- Humphrey, John, "Author mixes genres to create rich picture of American Indian life."
- Johnson, Douglas S., Book Review: Small Graces
- Marcou, David J., "The Nature of Things: Two Minnesota authors have found religion in the human connection to the earth and the cosmos" St. Paul Pioneer Press, Nov. 24, 1996 (review of A Haunting Reverence)
- Meyers, Kent, "One Polestar Too Many."
- Rector, Leta, "Neither Wolf Nor Dog" News From Indian Country: The Independent Native Journal, April 21, 2003, p. 13B
- Rouse, Jane, review of Letters to My Son and The Wisdom of the Native Americans,
- Shapiro, Joseph P.,"Pop culture: New books for Father's Day" U.S. News & World Report
- Shaw, Beverly, Prairie Edge Review: The Wolf at Twilight, Lakota Country Times, 27 October 2009
- Grossman, Mary Ann,"Coasting: Bemidji author Kent Nerburn turns a trip from Vancouver to Tijuana into a lucrative journey through the big time," (review of Road Angels)
- Chris Eyre (director of Smoke Signals), "A touching and enlightening pursuit of spirit." Amazon
- Leddy, Chuck, "Nerburn writes beautifully and with insight about the people he meets and the landscapes of Minnesota and the Dakotas." (review of The Girl Who Sang to the Buffalo)
- Rich, Marlena, "With grace, respect and the ease of a fascinating storyteller Kent Nerburn unveils a hidden past and mysterious worlds entrusted to him by Native American elders, a gift rarely and carefully given." (review of The Girl Who Sang to the Buffalo)
- David, Crumm, "What Nerburn hopes people are learning—and what they certainly will discover in his book—is the fundamentally different Indian perspective about our place, as humans, in the world." (review of Voices in the Stones)
- Nancy L. Roberts, "Kent Nerburn, who has lived and worked among Native American peoples in his northern Minnesota home, bridges Native and non-Native (Judeo-Christian) cultures in eloquent prose that invites comparison to Anne Lamott and Annie Dillard." (review of Native Echoes: Listening to the Spirit of the Land)

== Interviews ==
- Blair, Christopher. "The Way West: Midwesterner Kent Nerburn airs his recurring obsession with all things Pacific in a new book, 'Road Angels'" The Register Guard (Eugene, Oregon), Sept. 23, 2001, G1 and G5.
- Brown, Sharon. “Issues of Ultimate Concern,”
- Grindon, Joe, "The Great Mystery: An interview with Kent Nerburn", Science of the Mind, November 2012.
- Juline, Kathy. "Earth: Our Sacred Home, An Interview with Kent Nerburn," Science of Mind, Nov. 1999, Vol. 72, No. 11, p. 39-42.
- Oakes, Larry. ‘Echoes in the Stones,’ Star Tribune, Dec. 19, 1996, E1, E10.
- Samples, Pat. “What the Land Knows: Kent Nerburn’s Books Bridge the Spirits of Two Peoples,” Minnesota Monthly, Dec. 2004, pp. 43–45.
- South Dakota Public Broadcasting. "Brown Bag Book Club" In The Moment, June 17, 2019 Interview

“What the Land Knows: Kent Nerburn’s Books Bridge the Spirits of Two Peoples.”

== Other articles ==
- Jerde, Lyn, "'You have the courage of wolf, and the cunning of dog': Intimate evening spotlights issues of ancestors, awareness "

Kaszuba, Mike., "Northsider seeks a way to keep the presses rolling," Minneapolis Star and Tribune, Oct. 1, 1995, 3B.

- Rob, Schmidt (March 21, 2010). "Heape to film The Wolf at Twilight".
- Rosenblum, Gail. "Poignant essay about late-night fare has come home for author" Star Tribune, May 10, 2012. http://www.startribune.com/local/150873225.html
- Jerde, Lyn, "EP to read 'Neither Wolf nor Dog': Various community activities to accompany reading campaign
