= KKBJ-FM =

Coordinates: 47.556°N 94.801°W

- Bemidji, Minnesota; United States
- Frequency: 103.7 MHz
- Branding: Mix 103.7

Programming
- Format: Commercial; Top 40 (CHR)
- Affiliations: Fox News Radio; Premiere Networks; Westwood One

Ownership
- Owner: RP Broadcasting
- Sister stations: KKBJ, WBJI, WMIS-FM

History
- Call sign meaning: BemidJi

Technical information
- Licensing authority: FCC
- Class: C1
- ERP: 100,000 Watts
- HAAT: 146 meters

Links
- Public license information: Public file; LMS
- Webcast: Listen Live!
- Website: https://www.kkbj.com/

KKBJ-FM (103.7 FM), known on-air as "Mix 103.7", is a radio station based in Bemidji, Minnesota, that airs a Top 40 (CHR) format.

The station previously had a Top 40 (CHR) format as B-103, "Today's Best Music" and flipped to adult contemporary as Mix 103.7 in 1994, after being sold to RP Broadcasting. The station switched to hot adult contemporary format a few years later. In recent years, the station began evolving to a Top 40 (CHR). The station plays the Daily Download with Carson Daly every Saturday morning and Backtrax USA and the American Top 40 with Ryan Seacrest every Sunday.
