= KBUN (AM) =

Coordinates: 47°27′56″N 94°54′20″W

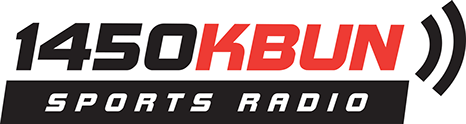
- Bemidji, Minnesota; United States
- Frequency: 1450 kHz
- Branding: 1450 KBUN

Programming
- Format: Sports
- Affiliations: FAN Radio Network, Minnesota News Network, ESPN Radio

Ownership
- Owner: Hubbard Broadcasting, Inc.; (HBI Radio Bemidji, LLC)
- Sister stations: KBUN-FM; KLLZ-FM; KBHP; KKZY

History
- First air date: 1946

Technical information
- Licensing authority: FCC
- Facility ID: 51879
- Class: C
- Power: 1,000 watts
- Translators: 94.9 K235BP (Bemidji); 100.1 K261EV (Bemidji)

Links
- Public license information: Public file; LMS
- Website: kbunsportsradio.com

KBUN (1450 AM; "Sports Radio AM 1450 KBUN"), is a sports radio station in Bemidji, Minnesota, broadcasting with 1,000 watts at 1450 AM. It is owned and operated by Hubbard Broadcasting, Inc. The Bemidji studios are located at 502 Beltrami Avenue, downtown Bemidji. The transmitter site is west of town on Jefferson Road.

Statewide news comes from the Minnesota News Network.

KBUN is part of the FAN Radio Network, whose in-house programs also can be heard throughout Minnesota, North Dakota, and Wisconsin. The flagship station of the FAN Radio Network is KFXN-FM, a sports talk radio station in the Twin Cities. Other programming comes from ESPN Radio.

KBUN also airs some local sports programming, and is the area home to the Minnesota Twins and Minnesota Vikings broadcasts.

== History ==
KBUN first went on the air on October 30, 1946, as part of a wave of radio and TV stations that launched after electronics rationing during World War II. It was initially owned and operated by Harry F. Pihl and R. W. Bradford as Bemidji Broadcasting Co. (aka, Paul Bunyan Broadcasting Co.) and broadcast with 250 watts at 1450 AM, from 7:00 a.m. to 11:00 p.m. Affiliated with the Mutual Broadcasting System (MBS), it was purchased on February 24, 1948, by Butler Broadcasting Co. and operated by Edward and Gwenyth Butler from then until 1956. Its studios were located at 419 1/2 Beltrami Avenue, Bemidji. On November 1, 1956, the FCC announced its approval of KBUN's sale to the Ben H. Potter, Jr., family.

In 1972 Ben Potter, Jr., sold Paul Bunyan Broadcasting Co., to his daughter, Anne P. Delong and her husband, Edward Delong III. In 1989, the Delongs sold KBUN to Louis H. Buron, Jr., who formed Omni Broadcasting as the umbrella company for his radio stations.

Hubbard Broadcasting announced on November 13, 2014, that it would purchase the sixteen Omni Broadcasting stations, including KBUN. The sale was completed on February 27, 2015, at a purchase price of $8 million for the 16 stations and one translator.

On December 10, 2010, Paul Bunyan Broadcasting Co., acquired FM translator station K235BP, 94.9 MHz, from Shine the Light, Inc., for $50,000. K235BP relays the KBUN signal. It was the first time the FAN Network was carried anywhere on an FM signal.
