= KPMI (AM) =

Radio station in Bemidji, Minnesota

- Bemidji, Minnesota; United States
- Frequency: 1300 kHz
- Branding: AM 1300 and FM 94.3 The Legends

Programming
- Language: English
- Format: Classic Country
- Affiliations: Fox News Radio; United Stations Radio Networks

Ownership
- Owner: Paskvan Media, Inc.
- Sister stations: KPMI-FM, WMIS-FM

History
- First air date: 2012

Technical information
- Licensing authority: FCC
- Facility ID: 160495
- Class: B
- Power: 2,500 watts (day); 600 watts (night)
- Transmitter coordinates: 47°26′32″N 94°51′57″W
- Translator: 94.3 W232DS (Bemidji)

Links
- Public license information: Public file; LMS
- Webcast: Listen live
- Website: kpmiam.com

KPMI (1300 AM, "The Legends") is a radio station licensed to Bemidji, Minnesota, United States, and serving Beltrami County. Two previous formats were all news and all sports. It currently broadcasts a classic country format. The station owned by Paskvan Media, Inc. Special programming on the station include Pure American Country Radio hosted by Bill Cody (syndicated by Syndication Networks) "Into The Blue," a Bluegrass Music program hosted by Terry Herd (syndicated by the Bluegrass Radio Network), "Rick Jackson's Country Classics" syndicated by United Stations Radio Networks, "Old Fashioned Revival Hour" and "Riders Radio Theater" rebroadcasts, Bill Gaither's Homecoming Radio, and 1 hour of Gospel music plus as of 2017, the Funtime Polka Party with Michael Bell and Patty Chmielewski of the Chmielewski Funtime Band plus NASCAR programming and as of 2020 Dance Time In Texas with DJ Mike Bilansky as the host.

== History ==
In January 2004, R.P. Broadcasting, Inc., applied to the Federal Communications Commission (FCC) for a construction permit for a new broadcast radio station. The FCC granted this permit with amendments on April 27, 2007, with a scheduled expiration date of October 20, 2011.

In December 2009, permit holder R.P. Broadcasting, Inc., reached an agreement to transfer the permit to Paskvan Media, Inc., for a total price of $30,000. The FCC approved the move on March 30, 2010, and the transaction was formally consummated on April 20, 2010. The new station was assigned call sign "KPMI" on August 26, 2011. After construction and testing were completed, the station was granted its broadcast license on March 1, 2012.

In February 2019, KPMI signed on local translator W232DS (94.3) from the combined transmitter/tower site north of Bemidji. On March 7, 2019, KPMI-FM was launched serving the Baudette, MN area. It also simulcasted KPMI (AM) from a 203' tower site west of Baudette, off Highway 192. KPMI-FM, originally permitted for 100 kW, but downgraded to 3 kW shortly before sign-on. The station could be upgraded to 100 kW in the future, if no other stations are close. Now KPMI FM is a Classic Rock station.
