= List of Gary Johnson 2016 presidential campaign endorsements =

Gary Johnson 2016
- Campaign: 2016 United States presidential election
- Candidate: Gary Johnson; Former Governor of New Mexico (1995–2003); William Weld; Former Governor of Massachusetts (1991–97)
- Affiliation: Libertarian Party
- Status: Announced: January 6, 2016; Nominated: May 29, 2016
- Headquarters: Salt Lake City, Utah
- Key people: William Weld (running mate); Ron Nielson (campaign manager); Mike McCauley (treasurer)
- Receipts: US$7,921,173 (9−22−16)
- Slogan(s): Live Free #TeamGov; Be Libertarian with me You in?

Website
- Official website

This is a list of notable individuals and organizations who have voiced their endorsement of the Libertarian Party's presidential nominee Gary Johnson for the 2016 presidential election. Note that "current" and "former" officeholders are identified by their status as of the time of their endorsement in 2016.

== U.S. representatives ==
=== Current ===
- Scott Rigell, Virginia (Republican)

=== Former ===
- Tom Campbell, California (1989–1993, 1995–2001) (Republican)
- Jim Kolbe, Arizona (1985-2007) (Republican)
- Tim Penny, Minnesota (1983-1995) (Independence Party)
- Dick Zimmer, New Jersey (1991–1997) (Republican)

== U.S. senators ==
=== Former ===
- James L. Buckley, senator from New York 1971-1977 ( Conservative then Republican)

== State governors ==
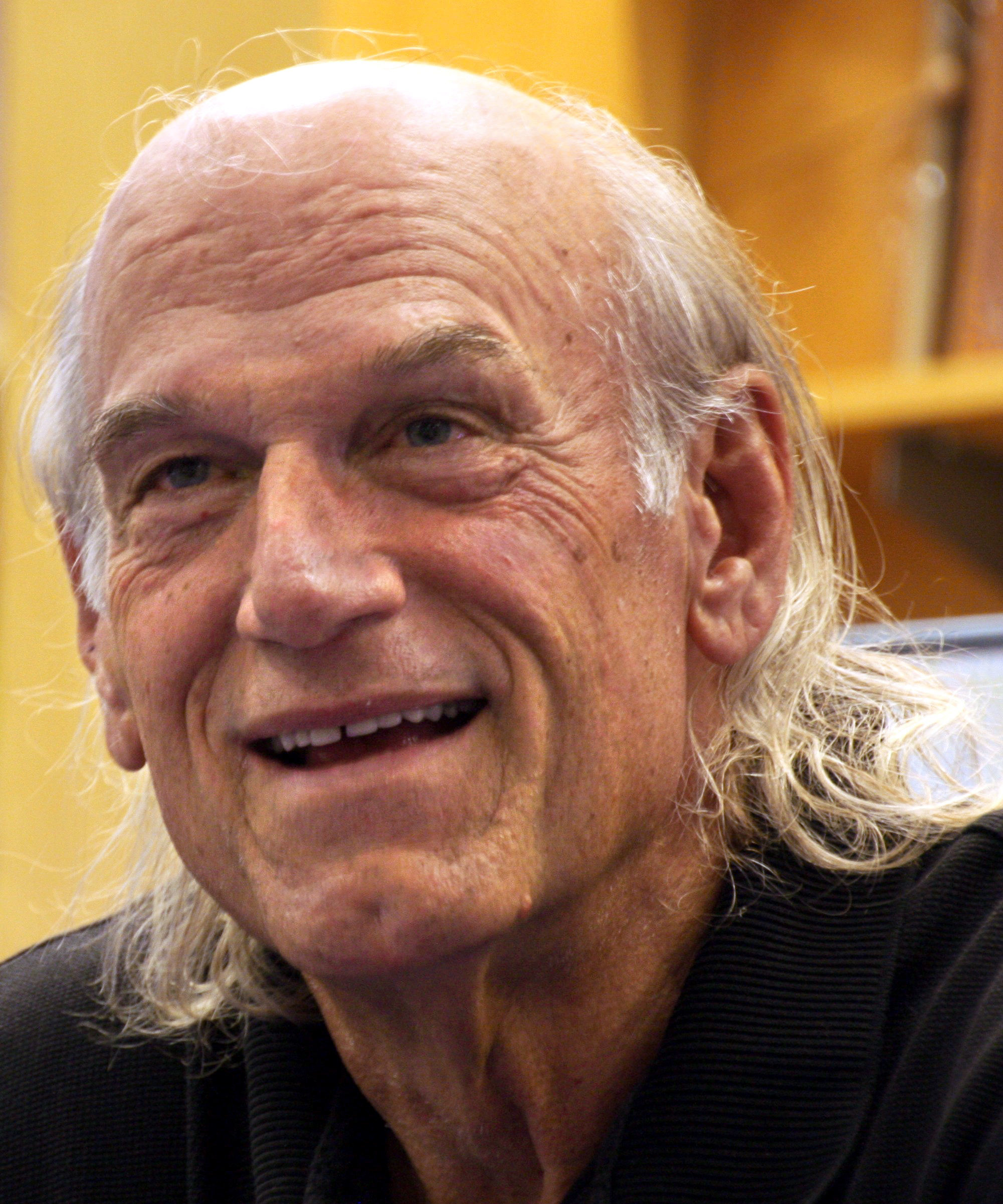
Former Governor of Minnesota Jesse Ventura in 2016

=== Former ===
- Jesse Ventura, 38th governor of Minnesota (1999–2003) (Reform Party and Independence Party)
- Bill Weld, 68th governor of Massachusetts (1991–1997) and Libertarian Party's nominee for vice president of the United States

== State legislators ==
=== Current ===
- Max Abramson, Libertarian New Hampshire state representative New Hampshire House of Representatives
- Tom Burditt, Republican Vermont state representative
- Laura Ebke, Libertarian Nebraska state senator
- Dawson Hodgson, Republican Rhode Island state senator
- Patti Komline, Republican Vermont state representative
- Mark B. Madsen, Libertarian Utah state senator
- John Moore, Libertarian Nevada assemblyman
- Joe Pickett, Democratic Texas state representative
- Heidi Scheuermann, Republican Vermont state representative
- Nicholas Schwaderer, Republican Montana state representative
- Lisa Torraco, Republican New Mexico state senator
- Daniel Zolnikov, Republican Montana state representative

=== Former ===
- Stan Adelstein, former Republican South Dakota state senator
- John Buckley, former Republican Virginia state delegate
- Basil Dannebohm, former Republican Kansas state representative
- Charlie Earl, former Republican Ohio state representative, 2014 Libertarian candidate for governor of Ohio
- John MacGovern, former Republican Massachusetts state representative
- Jim Nielson, former Republican Utah state representative
- Juan-Carlos Planas, former Republican member of the Florida House of Representatives
- Daniel Winslow, former Republican Massachusetts state representative

== Other state officials ==
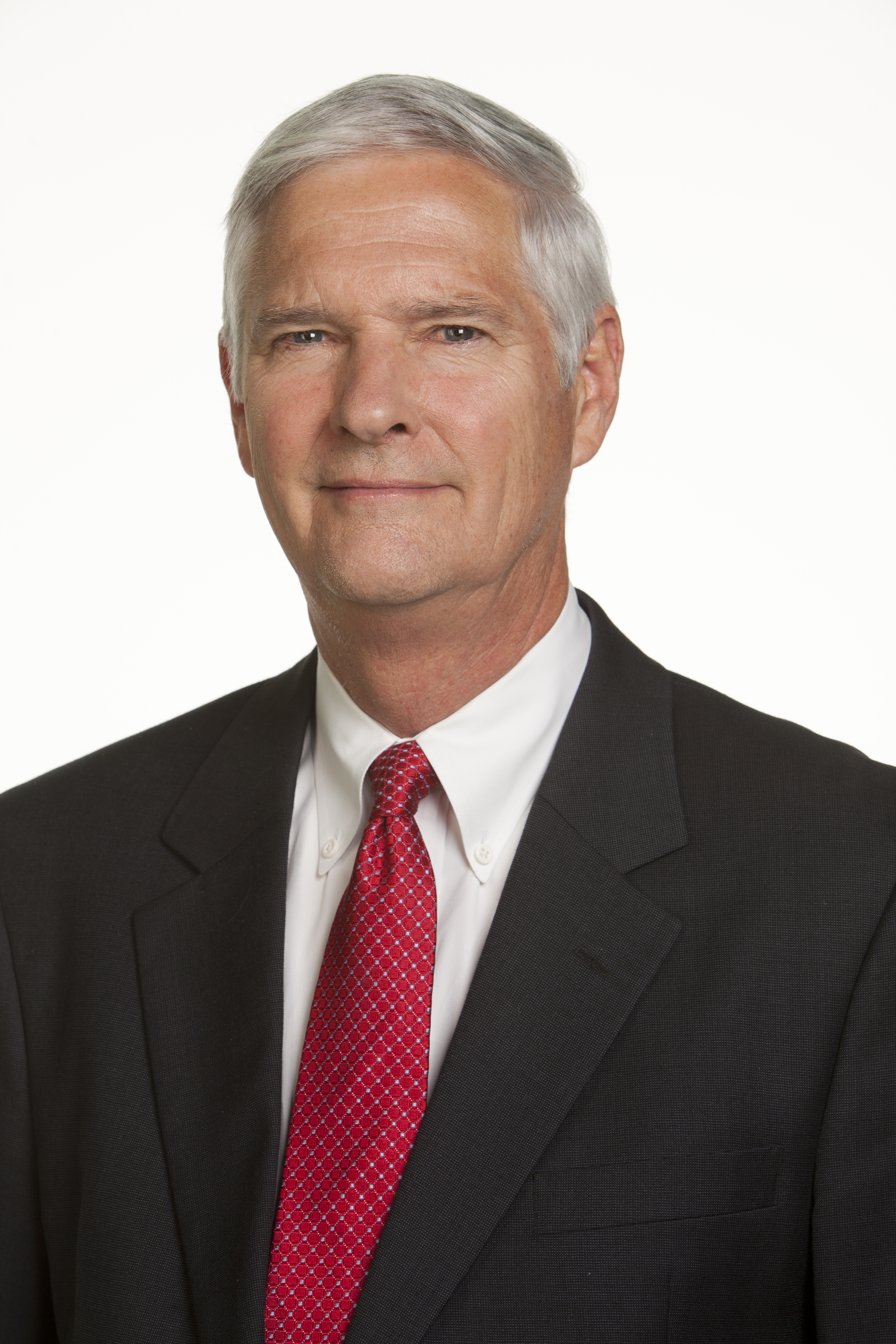
Judge Jim Gray

=== Former ===
- Tom Daxon, former Oklahoma state auditor and tnspector and Oklahoma secretary of finance and revenue, former chairman of the Oklahoma Republican Party and nominee for governor of Oklahoma
- Andrew Napolitano, former New Jersey Superior Court judge, author, senior judicial analyst for Fox News
- Andrew Sidamon-Eristoff, former New Jersey state treasurer, New York commissioner of tax and finance, and New York City Council member
- Darren White, former secretary of the New Mexico Department of Public Safety

== Municipal officials ==
- Tony Brooks, Republican Wilkes-Barre, Pennsylvania city councilman
- Danny Jones, independent mayor of Charleston, West Virginia
- Dave Richins, Republican Mesa, Arizona city councilman

== International political figures ==
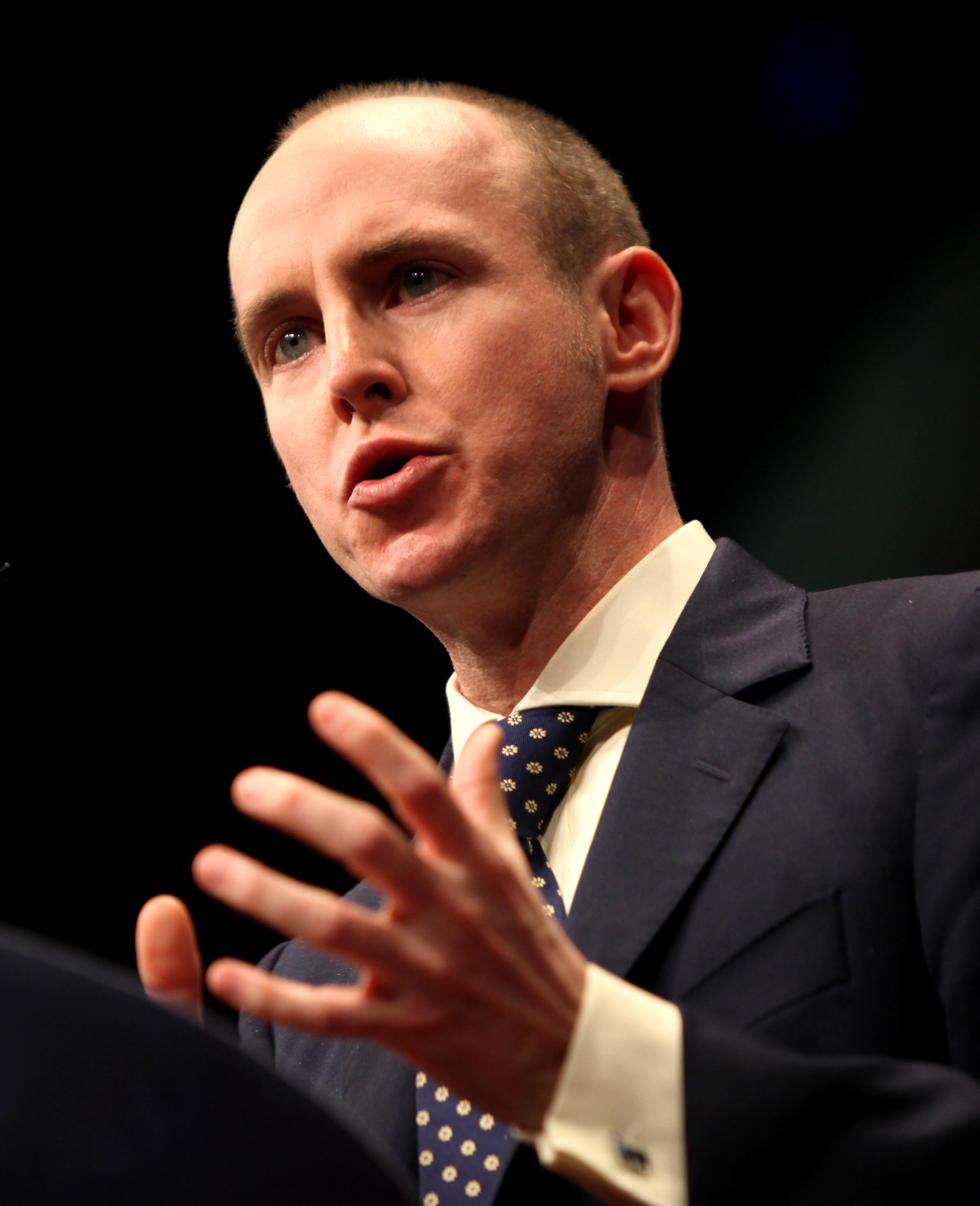
Daniel Hannan speaking at the 2012 CPAC

- Daniel Hannan, Conservative Party member of the European Parliament, secretary-general of the Alliance of European Conservatives and Reformists
- Josef Káles, Free Citizens Party deputy-leader from Czech Republic
- David Leyonhjelm, Liberal Democratic Party senator for New South Wales in Australia
- Paul Nuttall, leader of UKIP in the European Parliament
- Radim Smetka, Free Citizens Party deputy-leader from Czech Republic
- Karel Zvára, Free Citizens Party former deputy-leader from Czech Republic

== Other politicians ==
- Ed Crane, former national chairman of the Libertarian Party, co-founder and former president of the Cato Institute
- Jo Jorgensen, academic; Libertarian nominee for vice president in 1996; Libertarian nominee for U.S. Representative from SC-04 in 1992
- Jim Lark, chairman of Advocates for Self-Government and former national chairman of the Libertarian Party
- Robert Morrow, chairman of the Republican Party in Travis County, Texas
- Jennifer Nassour, former chairwoman of the Massachusetts Republican Party
- Austin Petersen, 2016 Libertarian presidential candidate
- Mary Ruwart, 2008 Libertarian Party presidential candidate, author, biomedical researcher

== Scholars ==
- Deirdre McCloskey, distinguished professor of economics, history, English, and communication at the University of Illinois at Chicago
- Jeffrey Miron, senior lecturer and director of undergraduate studies of the Harvard University economics department, director of economic policy studies at the Cato Institute, former department of economics chair at Boston University
- Michael Munger, professor of political science and economics and former chair of political science department at Duke University

== Businesspeople ==
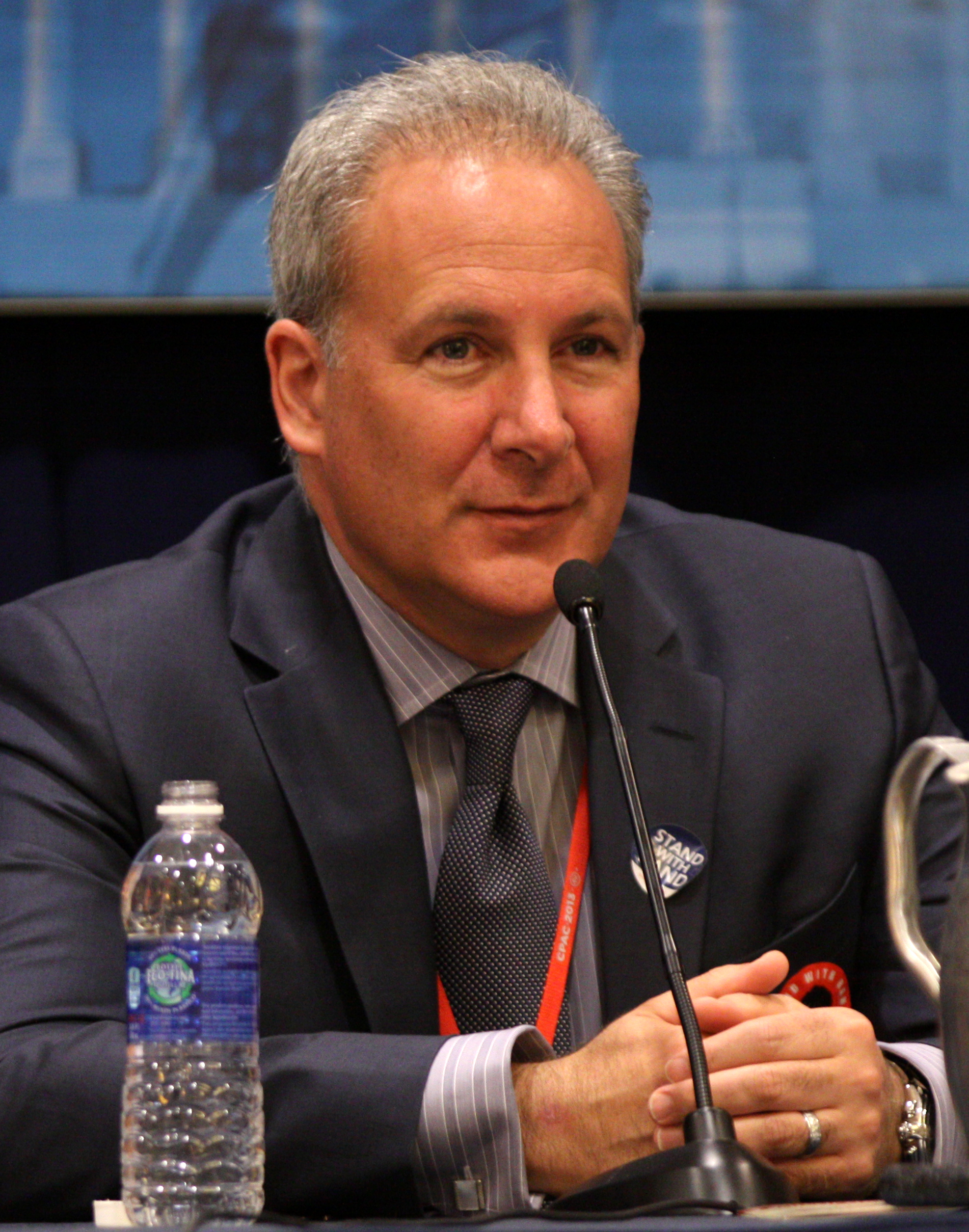
Peter Schiff

- Jonathan S. Bush, co-founder and CEO of athenahealth, member of the Bush family
- Marvin Bush, HCC Insurance Holdings and Securacom, member of the Bush family
- Patrick M. Byrne, founder and CEO of Overstock.com
- John Paul DeJoria, co-founder of John Paul Mitchell Systems and Patrón
- Jimmy E. Greene, president of the Greater Michigan chapter of Associated Builders and Contractors
- Phil Harvey, co-founder and president of Adam & Eve
- B. Wayne Hughes, chairman of Public Storage
- Steve Kerbel, businessman, entrepreneur and former 2016 Libertarian presidential candidate
- Palmer Luckey, founder of Oculus VR
- John Mackey, founder and CEO of Whole Foods Market
- Julian Robertson, founder of Tiger Management Corp.
- John Rowe, former CEO of Exelon
- Robert Sarvis, attorney, businessman, politician and software developer; former Virginia Senate and governor candidate
- Peter Schiff, CEO and chief global strategist of Euro Pacific Capital, founder of SchiffGold, author, radio host, 2010 Republican U.S. Senate candidate for Connecticut
- Fraser P. Seitel, president and co-founder of Emerald Partners
- John Stagliano, founder and owner of Evil Angel
- Jeff Yass, managing director and co-founder of Susquehanna International Group

== Media personalities ==
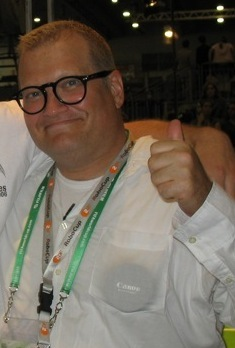
Drew Carey

=== Actors and comedians ===
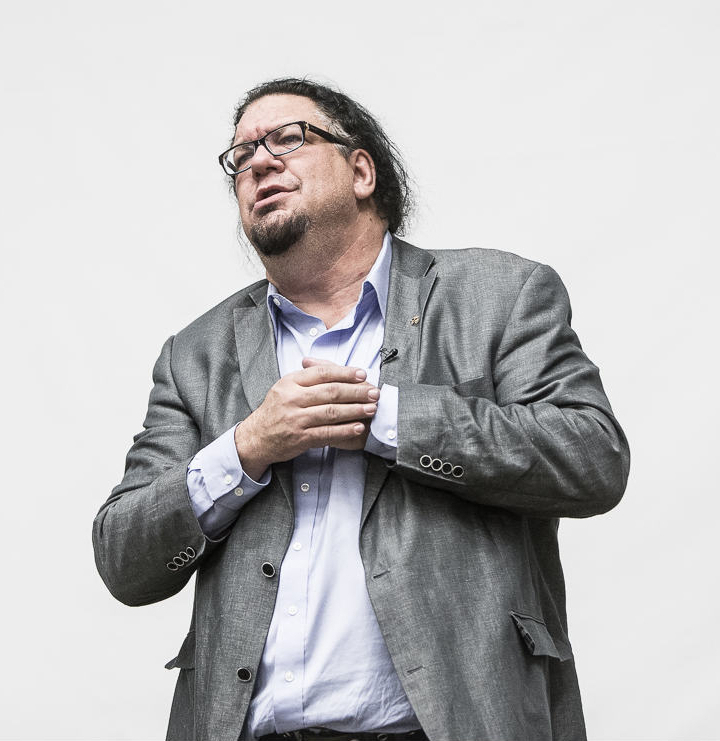
Penn Jillete

- Diedrich Bader, actor
- Drew Carey, comedian
- Brando Eaton, actor
- Melissa Joan Hart, actress
- Penn Jillette, of Penn & Teller
- Larry the Cable Guy, comedian
- Elliott Morgan, YouTube personality and former SourceFed host
- Raven-Symoné, actress, singer, television personality
- Joe Rogan, comedian, actor
- Doug Stanhope, comedian, actor, 2008 presidential candidate
- Teller, of Penn & Teller
- Brendon Walsh, comedian
- Randy Wayne, actor
- Kurt Yaeger, actor

=== Directors and screenwriters ===
- Heywood Gould, director and screenwriter
- David Lynch, director and screenwriter

=== Athletes and sports figures ===
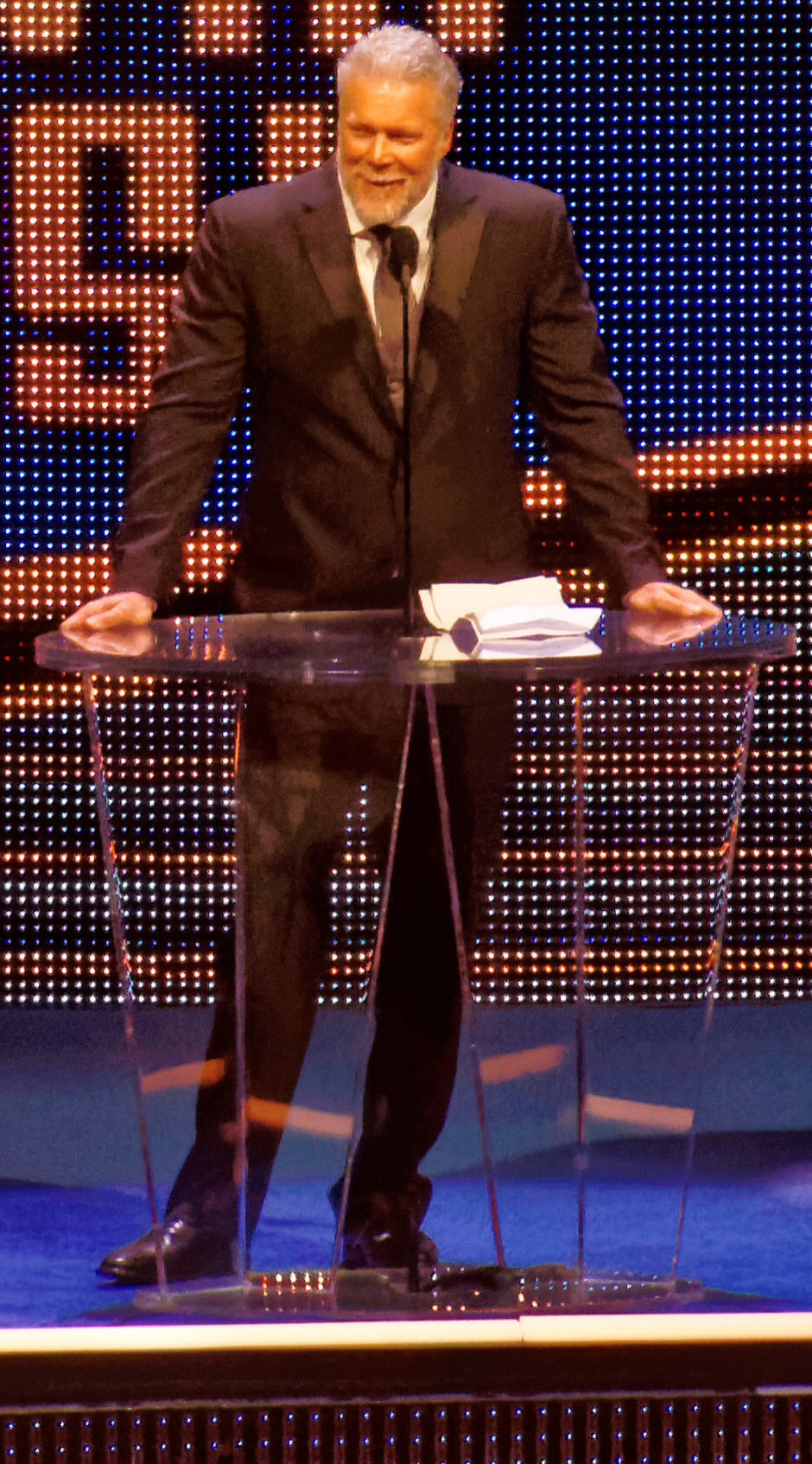
Kevin Nash

- Rudy Carpenter, football quarterback
- Hal Gill, retired professional ice hockey player
- Goldust, professional wrestler
- Kane, professional wrestler
- John Layfield, professional wrestler
- Chris Long, NFL football player
- Kevin Nash, professional wrestler
- Aron Price, professional golfer
- Kenny Smith, broadcaster and former NBA basketball player
- Val Venis, professional wrestler
- Sean Waltman, professional wrestler

=== Commentators, writers, and columnists ===
- Peter Bagge, cartoonist and Reason contributor
- Ronald Bailey, science writer
- Joshua Brown, author of The Reformed Broker blog and commentator on CNBC
- Jay Cost, writer for The Weekly Standard
- Kmele Foster, co-host of The Independents, political pundit
- Nick Gillespie, editor of Reason.com and Reason.tv
- Jack Hunter, politics editor for Rare.us
- Jeff Jacoby, columnist for The Boston Globe
- Arnold Kling, former writer for EconLog, economist
- William F. B. O'Reilly, opinion columnist for Newsday
- Debra Saunders, columnist for the San Francisco Chronicle
- Scott Stantis, editorial cartoonist for USA Today and the Chicago Tribune
- Jacob Sullum, syndicated columnist, senior editor of Reason
- Clay Travis, sports journalist, writer and television analyst for Fox Sports
- Jesse Walker, author and books editor of Reason
- Matt Welch, editor-in-chief of Reason magazine
- Cathy Young, writer for Reason, Newsday, and RealClearPolitics

=== Television and radio personalities ===
- Jillian Barberie, television and radio host
- Jedediah Bila, television and radio host
- Neal Boortz, talk radio host
- Steve Cochran, host of The Steve Cochran Show on WGN Radio
- Greg Gutfeld, television personality and Fox News host
- Kennedy, television host, host of Kennedy on Fox Business
- Adam Kokesh, talk show host, activist
- Keith Larson, radio host and political commentator
- Ronn Owens, talk radio host
- Dave Rubin, host of The Rubin Report
- John Stossel, media pundit
- Katherine Timpf, Fox News commentator
- Adrian Wyllie, activist, radio show host, 2014 Libertarian candidate for governor of Florida, former chairman of Libertarian Party of Florida
- John Ziegler, radio show host and documentary filmmaker

== Social and political activists ==
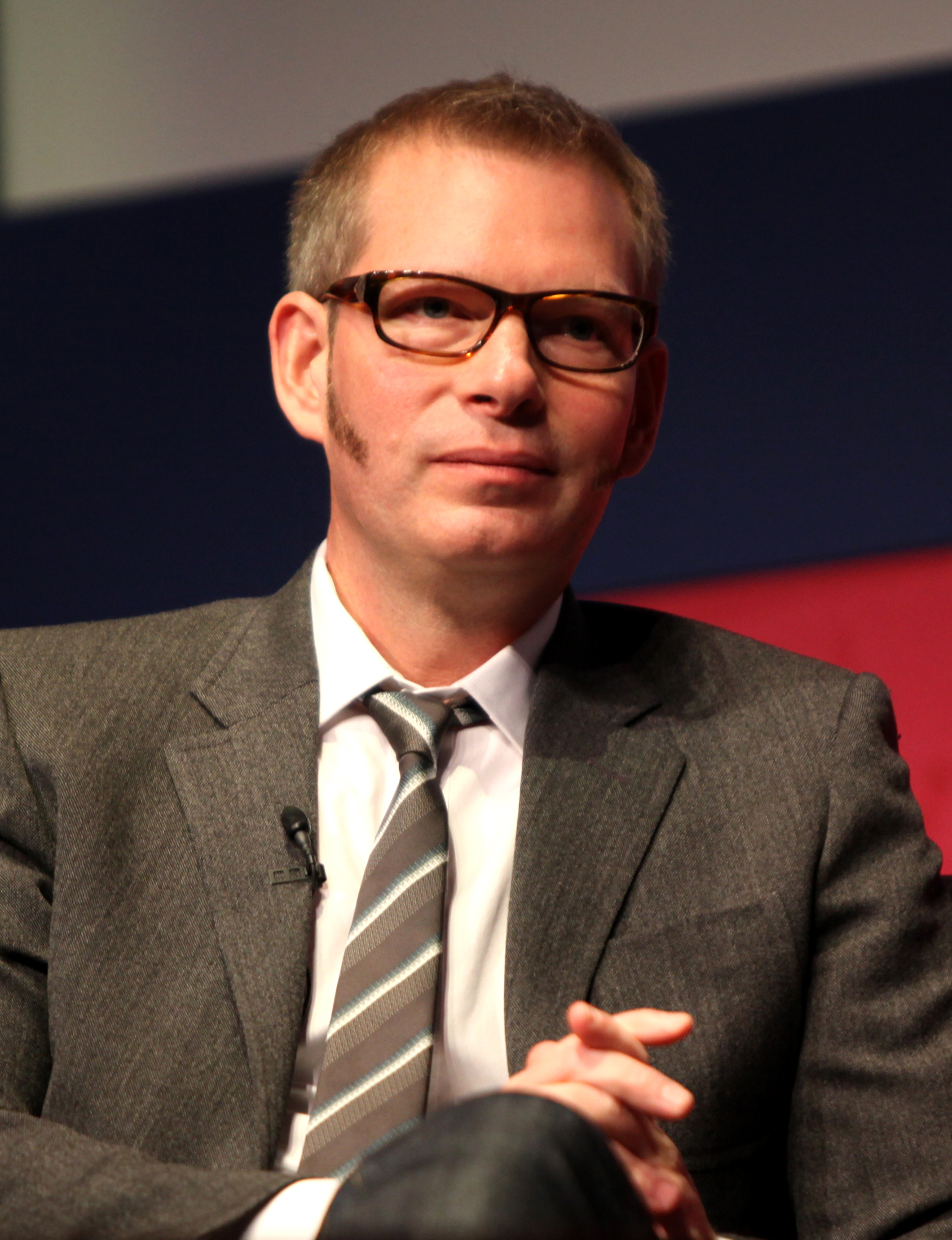
Matt Kibbe

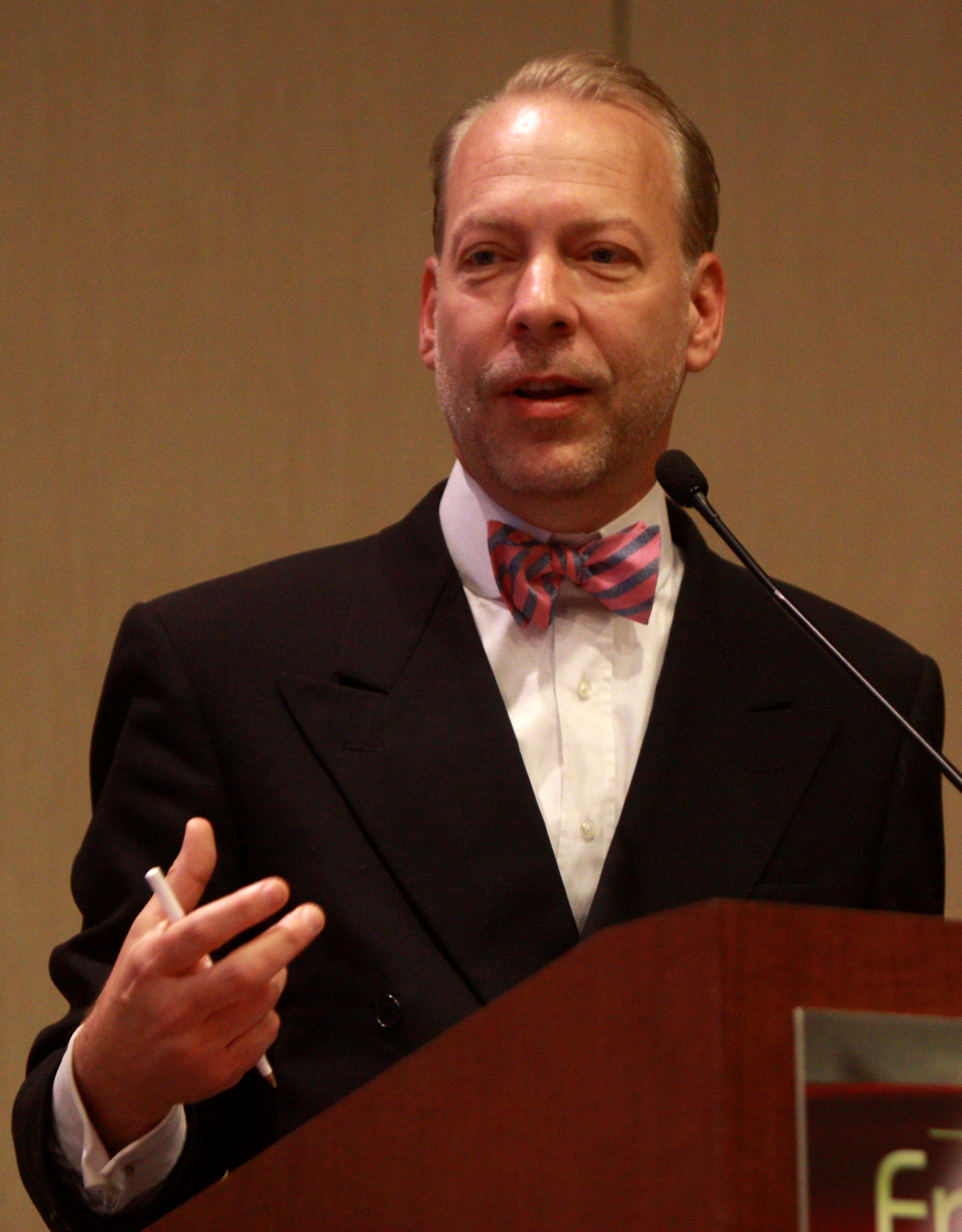
Jeffrey Tucker

- David Boaz, executive vice president of the Cato Institute
- Scott Boman, Libertarian Party of Michigan activist and candidate
- Alan Gura, litigator, constitutional lawyer
- Juan Hernandez, political advisor
- Carla Howell, president of the Center for Small Government
- Wendy Kaminer, former national board member of the American Civil Liberties Union
- Rob Kampia, co-founder and executive director of the Marijuana Policy Project
- Matt Kibbe, president of Free the People, former president of FreedomWorks
- John Kiriakou, CIA whistleblower and associate fellow for the Institute for Policy Studies
- Ed Lopez, Republican activist and former national vice chairman of the Republican Liberty Caucus
- Brady C. Olson, founder of Deez Nuts presidential campaign
- Walter Olson, senior fellow at the Cato Institute and author
- Curtis Sliwa, founder and CEO of the Guardian Angels
- Richard Winger, publisher and editor of Ballot Access News, political activist and analyst

== Major newspapers ==
- The Caledonian-Record
- Chicago Tribune
- Danville Register & Bee
- The Detroit News
- New Hampshire Union Leader
- The Post and Courier
- Richmond Times-Dispatch
- Winston-Salem Journal
- Yakima Valley Washington Daily Sun

== Organizations ==
- Cornell College Republicans (temporarily renamed Cornell Conservatives)
- Independence Party of New York
- Marijuana Policy Project
- New Mexico College Republican Federation
- Swarthmore Conservative Society

== See also ==
- List of Donald Trump presidential campaign endorsements, 2016
- List of Hillary Clinton presidential campaign political endorsements, 2016
- List of Hillary Clinton presidential campaign non-political endorsements, 2016
- List of Jill Stein presidential campaign endorsements, 2016
- List of Republicans opposing Donald Trump presidential campaign, 2016
