= 2016 Libertarian Party presidential primaries =

- March 1 – June 7, 2016

Non-binding preferential vote
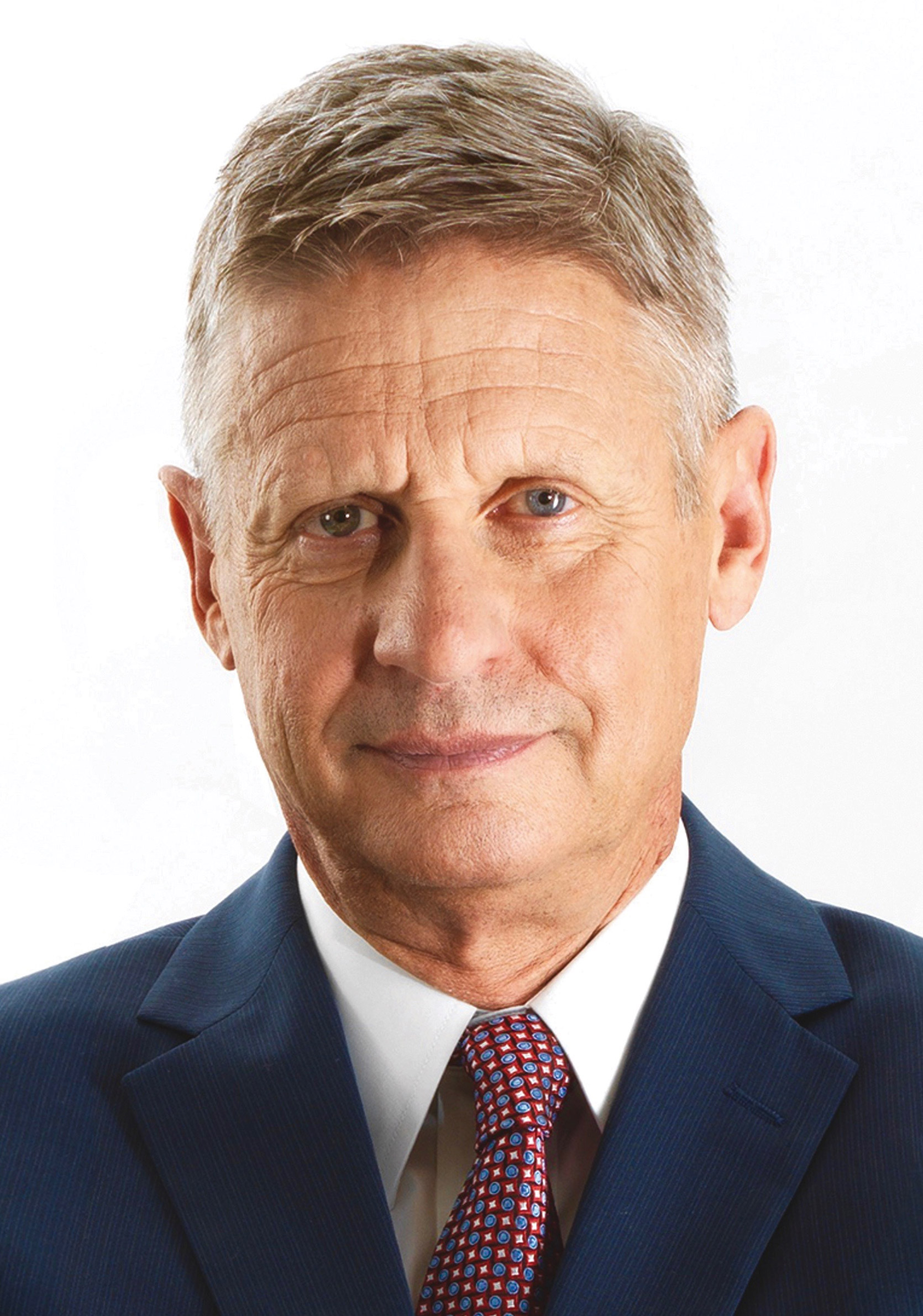

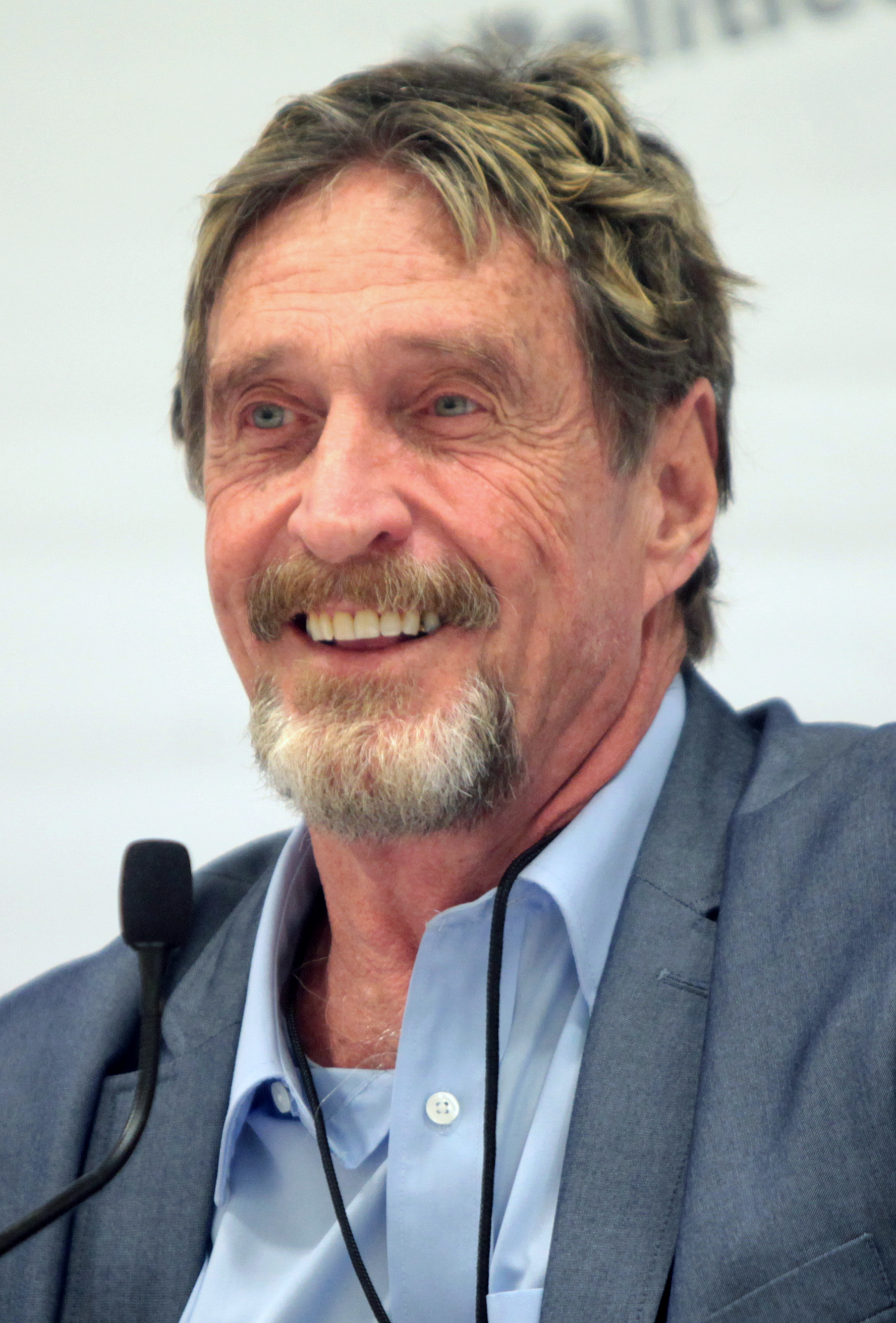

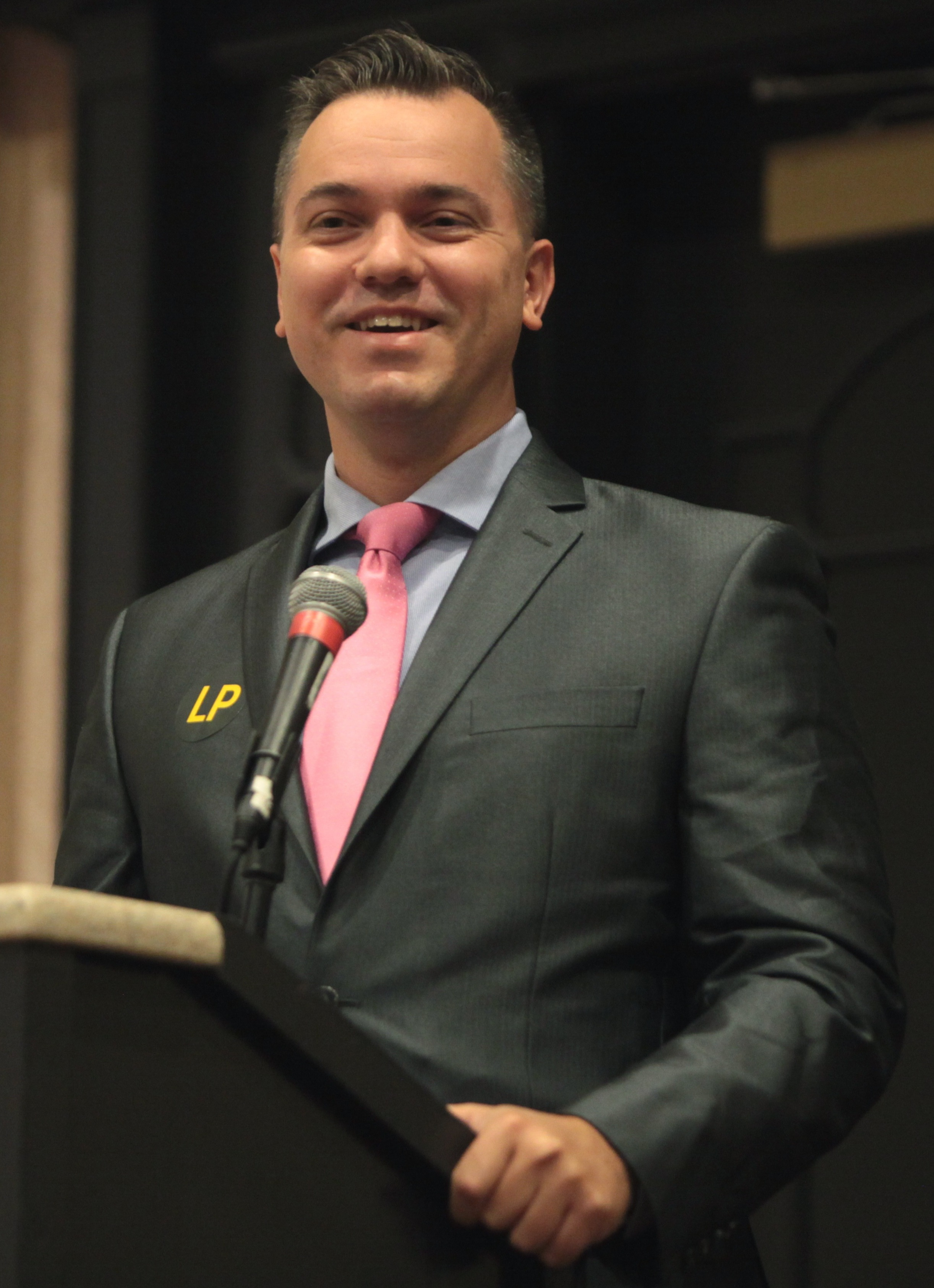
| Candidate | Gary Johnson | John McAfee |
| Home state | New Mexico | Tennessee |
| Contests won | 5 | 0 |
| Popular vote | 22,642 | 3,391 |
| Percentage | 55% | 8% |
| Candidate | Uncommitted | Austin Petersen |
| Home state | – | Missouri |
| Contests won | 1 | 0 |
| Popular vote | 3,209 | 3,066 |
| Percentage | 8% | 7% |
First place by popular vote
Gary Johnson (5)
Uncommitted (1)
No contest (45)
Previous Libertarian nominee
Gary Johnson
Libertarian nominee
Gary Johnson

The 2016 Libertarian Party presidential primaries and caucuses allowed electors to indicate non-binding preferences for the Libertarian Party's presidential candidate. These differed from the Republican or Democratic presidential primaries and caucuses in that they did not appoint delegates to represent a candidate at the party's convention to select the party's nominee for the United States presidential election. The party's nominee for the 2016 presidential election was chosen directly by registered delegates at the 2016 Libertarian National Convention, which ran from May 26 to 30, 2016. The delegates nominated former New Mexico governor Gary Johnson for president and former Massachusetts governor Bill Weld for vice president.

Four primaries and one caucus were held. Missouri and North Carolina held primaries on March 15, as an alternative ballot to other primaries such as those of the Republicans and Democrats. Gary Johnson, who had won the party's nomination in the 2012 presidential election, won North Carolina with 42%. In Missouri a plurality of voters chose the "Uncommitted" option over local candidate Austin Petersen, 40% to 29%, with Johnson not appearing on the Missouri ballot due to announcing his candidacy after the filing deadline. An Oregon primary was run on May 27 during the national convention, while the California primary was held on June 7 after the party's convention. The only caucus was in Minnesota on March 1, where 75% of the electors selected Gary Johnson. Jurisdictions in the 2016 primaries that did not participate in conventional roll call included: American Samoa, Guam, Northern Mariana Islands, Oregon, Puerto Rico, and the U.S Virgin Islands.

== Candidates ==
24 candidates were recognized by the Libertarian Party and 16 were ultimately eligible for the presidential nomination at the 2016 Libertarian National Convention. For a candidate to have been recognized by the Libertarian Party, they must have:

1. had a campaign website;
2. been a dues-paying member of the party;
3. met all U.S. Constitutional requirements to serve as President; and
4. not have simultaneously been a candidate for another political party.

Of the recognized candidates, eight did not run in any primary or caucus: Joey Berry, Brian Briggs, Thomas Clements, Malisia Garcia, Kevin McCormick, Robert Milnes, Mike Shannon and Heidi Zeman. The other ten recognized candidates as well as three unrecognized candidates – John David Hale (who was disrecognized because he was under 35 and so ineligible to serve as President), Nathan Norman and Merry Susan Nehls – stood in at least one primary or caucus, and appear in the table below. Five recognized candidates withdrew: Cecil Ince, Steve Kerbel, Joy Waymire, Bart Lower and Donald Eugene Lowe.

| Candidate | Profession | Campaign | On primary or caucus ballot | | | | | | Popular vote |
| Candidate | Profession | Campaign | MN | NC | MO | NE | OR | CA | Popular vote |
|---|---|---|---|---|---|---|---|---|---|
| Gary Johnson | 29th Governor of New Mexico (1995–2003) | (campaign • positions • website); Running mate: Bill Weld | Yes | Yes | No | Yes | Yes | Yes | 22,642 |
| John McAfee | Founder and CEO of McAfee, Inc. (1987–1994) | (website); Running mate: Judd Weiss | Yes | No | No | Yes | Yes | Yes | 3,391 |
| Austin Petersen | Owner and founder of The Libertarian Republic (2012–present) | (website) | Yes | Yes | Yes | Yes | No | Yes | 3,066 |
| Rhett Smith | Private security officer | (website) | Yes | Yes | Yes | No | Yes | Yes | 1,678 |
| Marc Allan; Feldman | Anesthesiologist at the Cleveland Clinic (1998–2016) | (website) | Yes | Yes | Yes | Yes | No | Yes | 1,219 |
| John David Hale | Student | | No | Yes | No | No | No | Yes | 1,199 |
| Joy Waymire | Ranch foreman | (website); Withdrew: April 13, 2016 (endorsed John McAfee) | Yes | Yes | No | No | No | Yes | 1,189 |
| Steve Kerbel | Businessman and entrepreneur | (website); Withdrew: March 16, 2016 (endorsed Gary Johnson) | Yes | Yes | Yes | Yes | No | Yes | 1,098 |
| Jack Robinson, Jr. | Businessman and inventor | (website) | Yes | Yes | No | No | No | Yes | 808 |
| Darryl W. Perry | Owner and Managing Editor of Free Press Publications | (website); Running mate: Will Coley | Yes | Yes | No | No | Yes | Yes | 662 |
| Cecil Ince | Owner of Ince Films | (website); Withdrew: March 17, 2016 | Yes | Yes | Yes | No | No | Yes | 625 |
| Derrick Michael Reid | Political analyst and retired engineer | (website) | Yes | Yes | No | No | Yes | Yes | 543 |
| Merry Susan Nehls | | | No | No | No | No | Yes | No | 34 |
| Keenan Dunham | Former Chair of the Horry County Libertarian Party Paralegal, author, activist | (website) | No | No | No | No | Yes | No | 18 |
| Nathan Norman | Entertainer | (website) | No | No | No | No | Yes | No | 8 |
| Shawna Joy Sterling | Pastoral Counselor | (website) | Yes | No | No | No | No | No | 1 |
Alternate ballot options:
| No preference/ None of the above/ Uncommitted | N/A | | Yes | Yes | Yes | No | Yes | No | 3,209 |

== Timeline of the race ==
=== Background ===
The 2016 United States presidential election was the twelfth contested election for the Libertarian Party of the United States. The 2004 presidential election saw Libertarian nominee Michael Badnarik appear on ballots in 48 states plus the District of Columbia. He received 0.3% of the popular vote, and came fourth behind the two major parties' nominees as well as third-placed independent Ralph Nader. In the 2008 election, Bob Barr was nominated as the Libertarian Parties's candidate for the presidency and had ballot access to 45. However, Barr insignificantly improved upon Badnarik's performance, capturing only 0.4% of the popular vote in an election that also saw Nader finish a strong third behind the Democratic and Republican parties.

Having received minimal publicity in previous elections, which contributed to the low voting share that the party received, the Libertarian Party gained significant exposure and media attention in the lead-up to the 2012 Libertarian National Convention and the 2012 presidential election, starting with former two term New Mexico governor Gary Johnson's announcement of his presidential run with the Party. Using the publicity gained from the announcement, Johnson praised the Libertarian Party and championed their beliefs through interviews and public statements, which were often profane and harshly critical of both the Democratic and Republican parties. Johnson won the nomination at the 2012 Libertarian National Convention running on a platform of being more fiscally conservative than Republican nominee Mitt Romney and more socially liberal than Democratic President Barack Obama. Johnsons's campaign for the presidency focused mostly on upholding the continued publicity gained by the Libertarian Party due to his campaign and gaining support from independents and dissenting Democratic and Republican voters, often through echoing resentment towards the two parties. This included a court challenge against the Commission on Presidential Debates by Johnson that sought to include him in the official presidential election debates.

On election day, Johnson oversaw a relatively sharp rise in the Libertarian Party's vote total, earning 1% of the popular vote, which equated to 1,275,821 votes, in the 48 states plus D.C. where the Libertarian Party had ballot access. The result was double the number Bob Barr received in 2008, and made the Libertarian's the most popular third party in the election. In the election Johnson received the most votes ever for the Libertarian Party nominee, passing Ed Clark's candidacy in 1980. His campaign received a largest vote total for a third-party presidential candidacy since Ralph Nader's 2000 campaign.

=== January 2015 to January 2016: Early candidates ===
On January 7, physician Marc Allen Feldman became one of the first candidates to enter the race for the 2016 nomination. Over the following months, candidacies were announced by Joy Waymire, Cecil Ince, Steve Kerbel, Shawna Joy Sterling, Derrick Michael Reid, and Rhett Smith. In early September, candidates entering the race included John David Hale, Jack Robinson Jr, and Austin Petersen.

On December 24, 2015, antivirus software pioneer John McAfee abandoned his previous effort to run as the candidate of a newly created Cyber Party, and announced he would instead seek the Libertarian nomination. He had previously announced that his Cyber Party running mate would be Ken Rutkowski, but Rutkowski did not join him in seeking the Libertarian nomination.

Gary Johnson formally announced his candidacy for the 2016 Libertarian presidential nomination, in an interview with Neil Cavuto on the Fox Business Network program Coast to Coast, on January 6, 2016.

=== April 2016: Top tier emerges ===
Though the Libertarian Party has little to no scientific polling and does not conduct binding primaries and caucuses, the first nationally televised pre-nominating convention Libertarian Party debate featured three candidates widely regarded as the leading contenders for the nomination: former New Mexico governor Gary Johnson, founder and CEO of McAfee Inc. John McAfee and owner and founder of The Libertarian Republic Austin Petersen. A later debate hosted by RT America featured Marc Allan Feldman, Kevin McCormick, and Darryl Perry, however this did not receive as much media attention as the one featuring the three candidates in the top tier.

=== Early May 2016: Ventura declines to run ===
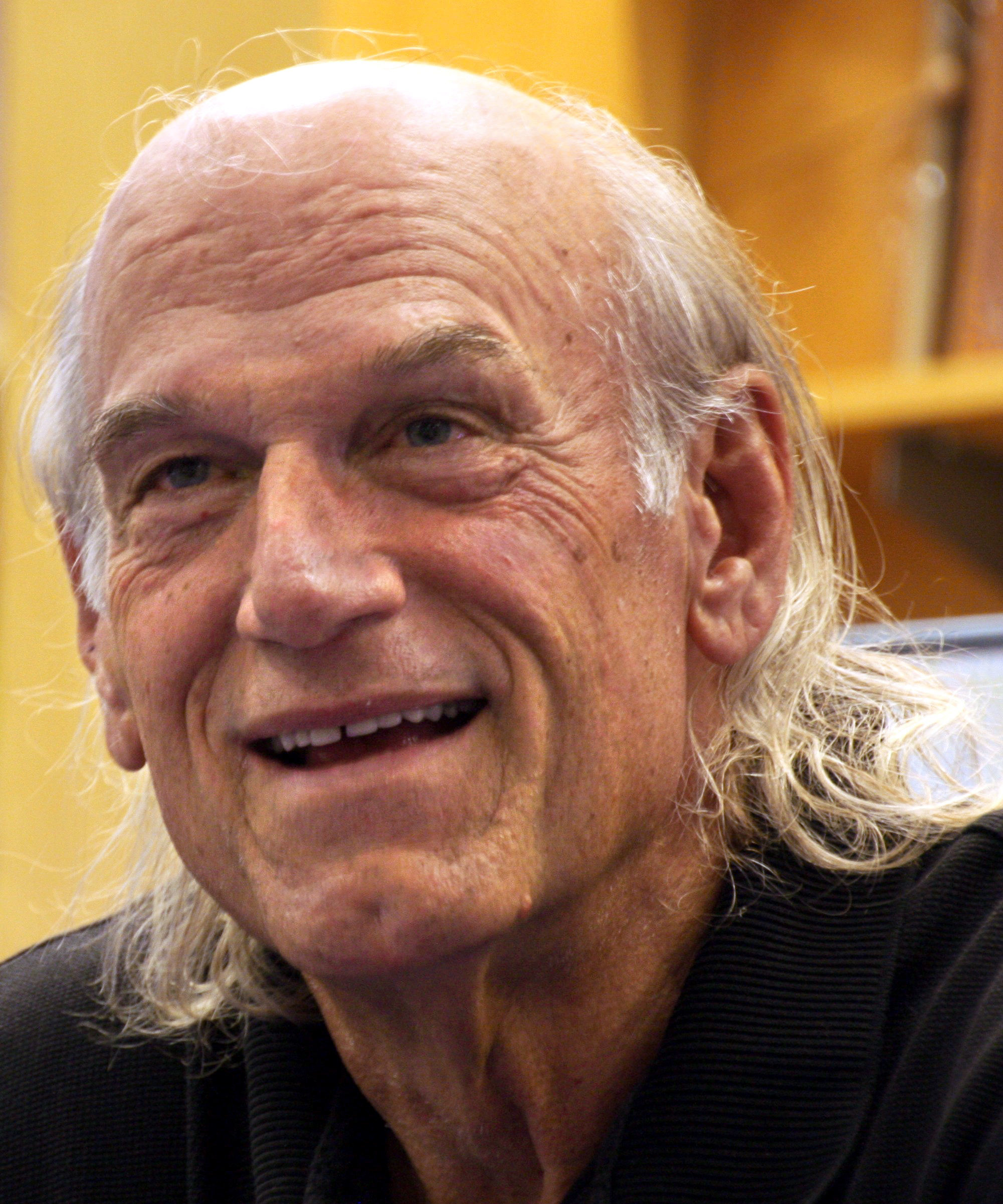
Jesse Ventura speaking in Minnesota in 2016.

In several late 2015 interviews including those on The Alan Colmes Show and In Depth with Graham Bensinger, Jesse Ventura publicly flirted with the idea of running for president in 2016 as a Libertarian. Beginning on February 29, 2016, Ventura again made headlines following an announcement that if Bernie Sanders were to lose the Democratic Party nomination to Hillary Clinton, he would launch a presidential campaign under the Libertarian Party. Ventura subsequently appeared on RT, CNN, Alex Jones and various local radio outlets the following several days reiterating interest in a presidential campaign. He likewise revealed that he was formally invited to the 2016 Libertarian National Convention in Orlando, Florida by party leaders and that he would announce by the end of March if he were to go that route.

On March 3, 2016 Ventura released a shortlist of preliminary campaign platforms if he were to run for president. Included were rebuilding infrastructure, focusing on alternative energy, ending all foreign wars and following the teachings of Major General Smedley Butler, ending the war on drugs and reforming campaign financing. Ventura ultimately decided not to seek the presidency, allowing his self determined deadline of May 1 to pass without an announcement. In mid-July, Ventura wrote an article declaring his support for Gary Johnson.

=== Late May 2016: Johnson consolidates support ===
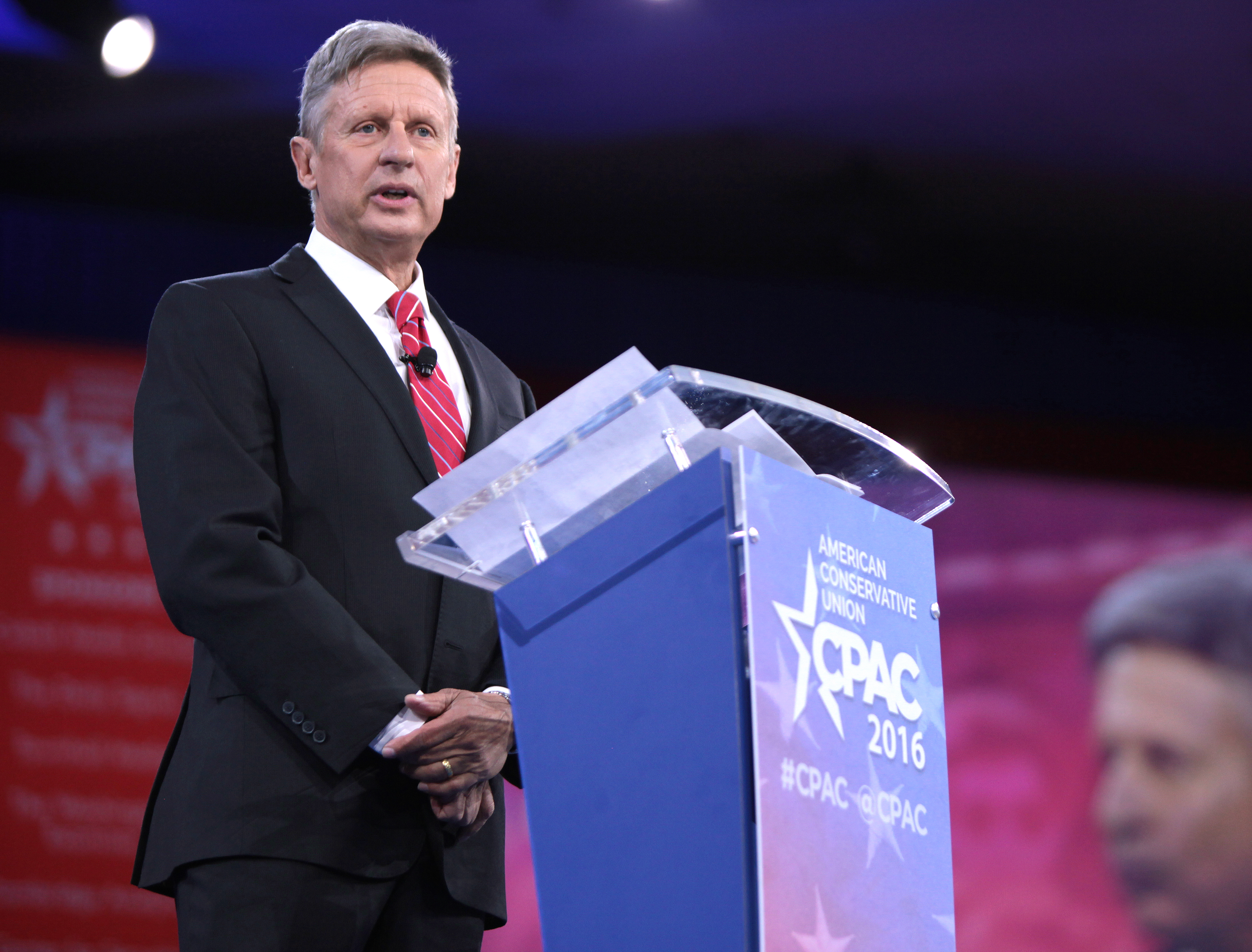
Gary Johnson speaking at the 2016 Conservative Political Action Conference (CPAC) in Washington, D.C.

After Donald Trump won the Indiana primary on May 3, Texas Senator Ted Cruz and Ohio Governor John Kasich suspended their campaigns, Donald Trump became the presumptive nominee for the Republican Party. This sparked the Stop Trump movement, also referred to as #NeverTrump to consider running an independent candidate of their own such as former Texas governor Rick Perry, former Republican nominee Mitt Romney or Nebraska senator Ben Sasse, all of whom declined to run. As the filing deadline for Texas and other states quickly passed, the Libertarian Party gained national recognition when Gary Johnson was included in a national poll conducted by Monmouth University and received 11 percent. Johnson was quickly deemed the front-runner for the Libertarian Party presidential nomination and was featured in subsequent polls. Johnson's name was also Googled more times than the Libertarian Party itself, and he was featured in many interviews by mainstream media publications, something that none of the other Libertarian candidates had been able to do at that point in the campaign. During the 2016 Libertarian National Convention various news networks flocked to the convention, and C-SPAN covered the results. Johnson won nomination on the second ballot of the convention.

== Polling ==
=== Online LP polling ===
| Poll source | Sample size | Date(s) | Feldman | Garcia | Ince | Johnson | Kerbel | McAfee | McCormick | Perry | Petersen | Reid | Robinson | Smith | Sterling | Waymire | Zeman | Others |
| Libertarian Party website | 9,102 | Mar 17–31 | 1% | nil | nil | 58% | O | 7% | 9% | 5% | 13% | nil | nil | nil | nil | nil | nil | None of the Above 1%/ Other 4% |
| Libertarian Party website | 8,609 | Feb 20– Mar 17 | 1% | — | nil | 54% | 4% | 14% | — | 2% | 18% | nil | 1% | nil | 1% | nil | — | None of the Above 2%/ Other 4% |

== Primaries and caucuses ==
=== Minnesota caucuses ===
Type: Open

The Minnesota caucus was run on March 1, 2016, using ranked choice voting. Gary Johnson took over 75% of the 226 first-preference votes cast, with John McAfee second on 12% and Austin Petersen third on 8%.

Minnesota Libertarian presidential caucus, March 1, 2016
| Candidate | Votes | Percentage |
|---|---|---|
| Gary Johnson | 171 | 76% |
| John McAfee | 26 | 12% |
| Austin Petersen | 17 | 8% |
| Darryl Perry | 4 | 2% |
| Cecil Ince | 2 | 1% |
| Steve Kerbel | 2 | 1% |
| None of the above | 2 | 1% |
| Marc Allan Feldman | 1 | 0% |
| Shawna Joy Sterling | 1 | 0% |
| Total | 226 | 100% |

County results —Minnesota. Gary Johnson No Votes

=== Missouri primary ===
Type: Open

The Missouri primary ran on March 15, 2016, alongside those of the Republican, Democratic, and Constitution parties. 40% of the electorate voted to stand uncommitted to any candidate. Austin Petersen, running in his home state, finished second with 29% of the statewide vote, which was double that of Steve Kerbel from Colorado, who finished third with 14%. Petersen comfortably won the support of voters in the state's capital, Jefferson City, and its surrounding counties, but fell heavily behind the uncommitted vote in the state's two largest cities, Kansas City and St. Louis. Kerbel won three counties around Springfield, while Marc Allan Feldman, Cecil Ince, and Rhett Smith all won a sprawl of counties across the state; in most of these counties, however, only a single vote was cast. No votes were cast for Libertarian Party candidates in the northwestern counties of Harrison, Holt, Mercer, and Worth.

Missouri Libertarian presidential primary, March 15, 2016
| Candidate | Votes | Percentage |
|---|---|---|
| Uncommitted | 1,170 | 40% |
| Austin Petersen | 851 | 29% |
| Steve Kerbel | 401 | 14% |
| Marc Allan Feldman | 239 | 8% |
| Cecil Ince | 134 | 5% |
| Rhett Smith | 99 | 3% |
| Total | 2,894 | 100% |

County results — Missouri.: Uncommitted Austin Petersen Steve Kerbel Marc Allan Feldman / Cecil Ince Rhett Smith Tie No Votes

=== North Carolina primary ===
Type: Semi-closed

The North Carolina primary was also run on March 15, 2016, and also alongside the primaries of the Republican, Democratic, and Constitution parties. Gary Johnson won against competing candidates with 42% of the primary vote, overcoming 35% of the electorate who remained uncommitted to any candidate, and far ahead of third-place finisher John David Hale with 6%. Most urban counties showed majority support for Johnson, particularly in the state's largest city, Charlotte, and its capital, Raleigh, while uncommitted votes mostly came from rural counties across the state. Many counties were tied between Johnson and the uncommitted vote, but a number of counties in the east recorded ties between Johnson and other candidates such as John David Hale and Joy Waymire, albeit with a small number of votes. In Gates County, a four-way tie was recorded when Gary Johnson, Cecil Ince, and Derrick Michael Reid recorded one vote each, with an additional uncommitted voter accounted for. Tyrrell was the only county in the entire state where Johnson did not win or tie; instead Hale tied with an uncommitted voter, with one vote each.

North Carolina Libertarian presidential primary, March 15, 2016
| Candidate | Votes | Percentage |
|---|---|---|
| Gary Johnson | 2,414 | 42% |
| No Preference | 2,067 | 36% |
| John David Hale | 329 | 6% |
| Joy Waymire | 268 | 5% |
| Austin Petersen | 189 | 3% |
| Darryl Perry | 118 | 2% |
| Steve Kerbel | 109 | 2% |
| Derrick Michael Reid | 74 | 1% |
| Cecil Ince | 72 | 1% |
| Jack Robinson, Jr. | 70 | 1% |
| Marc Allan Feldman | 66 | 1% |
| Rhett Smith | 43 | 1% |
| Total | 5,819 | 100% |

County results — North Carolina. Gary Johnson Uncommitted Tie

=== Nebraska primary ===
Type: Semi-closed

The Nebraska primary was held on May 10, 2016. Independents and registered Libertarians were allowed to vote in the state's Libertarian primary. The Nebraska Primary marked the third largest victory for the Johnson campaign, despite the most recent poll having shown him only 1% above Petersen nationally.

Nebraska Libertarian presidential primary, May 10, 2016
| Candidate | Votes | Percentage |
|---|---|---|
| Gary Johnson | 366 | 52% |
| Austin Petersen | 135 | 19% |
| John McAfee | 121 | 17% |
| Marc Allan Feldman | 48 | 7% |
| Steve Kerbel | 35 | 5% |
| Total | 705 | 100% |

County results — Nebraska: Gary Johnson Austin Petersen John McAfee / Marc Allan Feldman Tie No Votes

=== Oregon primary ===
The Oregon primary was completed on May 27, 2016, the last day to receive mail-in ballots.

Oregon Libertarian presidential primary, May 27, 2016
| Candidate | Votes | Percentage |
|---|---|---|
| Gary Johnson | 422 | 57% |
| John McAfee | 105 | 14% |
| Merry Susan Nehls | 34 | 5% |
| Austin Petersen (write-in) | 25 | 3% |
| Darryl Perry | 21 | 3% |
| Keenan Dunham | 18 | 2% |
| Derrick Michael Reid | 10 | 1% |
| Nathan Norman | 8 | 1% |
| Rhett Smith | 6 | 1% |
| NOTA (write-in) | 2 | 0% |
| Other write-ins | 91 | 12% |
| Total | 742 | 100% |

=== California primary ===
Type: Semi-closed

In the California primary on June 7, the Libertarian Party appeared alongside the Republicans, Democrats, the Green Party (as part of their own series of primaries), the American Independent Party and the Peace and Freedom Party.

This non-binding primary took place after the 2016 Libertarian National Convention.

California Libertarian presidential primary, June 7, 2016
| Candidate | Votes | Percentage |
|---|---|---|
| Gary Johnson | 19,294 | 62% |
| John McAfee | 3,139 | 10% |
| Austin Petersen | 1,853 | 6% |
| Rhett Smith | 1,531 | 5% |
| Joy Waymire | 923 | 3% |
| John David Hale | 873 | 3% |
| Marc Allan Feldman | 867 | 3% |
| Jack Robinson, Jr. | 739 | 2% |
| Steve Kerbel | 556 | 2% |
| Darryl Perry | 521 | 2% |
| Derrick Michael Reid | 462 | 2% |
| Cecil Ince | 417 | 1% |
| Total | 31,175 | 100% |

Results by county. Gary Johnson Tie

== 2016 National Convention ==
Libertarian National Convention Presidential vote, 2016 – 1st round
| Candidate | first ballot | Percentage |
|---|---|---|
| Gary Johnson | 458 | 50% |
| Austin Petersen | 197 | 21% |
| John McAfee | 131 | 14% |
| Darryl Perry | 63 | 7% |
| Marc Allen Feldman | 58 | 6% |
| Kevin McCormick | 9 | 1% |
| None of the above | 5 | 1% |
| Ron Paul (write-in) | 1 | nil |
| Vermin Supreme (write-in) | 1 | nil |
| Heidi Zemen (write-in) | 1 | nil |
| Derrick Grayson (write-in) | 1 | nil |
| Totals | 925 | 100% |

No candidate achieved the majority on the first ballot, so there was a second ballot vote. After finishing last of the six nominated candidates, McCormick was excluded from the second ballot.

Libertarian National Convention Presidential vote, 2016 – 2nd ballot
| Candidate | Second Ballot | Percentage |
|---|---|---|
| Gary Johnson | 518 | 56% |
| Austin Petersen | 203 | 22% |
| John McAfee | 131 | 14% |
| Darryl Perry | 52 | 6% |
| Marc Allen Feldman | 18 | 2% |
| None of the above | 2 | nil |
| Derrick Grayson (write-in) | 1 | nil |
| Michael Shannon (write-in) | 1 | nil |
| Kevin McCormick (write-in) | 1 | nil |
| Rhett Smith (write-in) | 1 | nil |
| Totals | 928 | 100% |

== Endorsements ==
=== Gary Johnson campaign ===
==== Political figures ====
===== Mayors and other municipal or county leaders =====
- Jeff Krauss, former mayor of Bozeman, Montana

===== International political figures =====
- Daniel Hannan, Conservative Party member of the European Parliament, Secretary-General of the Alliance of European Conservatives and Reformists

===== Other politicians =====
- Ed Clark, 1980 Libertarian presidential nominee
- Mark Hinkle, former National Chairman of The Libertarian Party
- Geoff Neale, former National Chairman of The Libertarian Party
- Bill Redpath, former National Chairman of The Libertarian Party

==== Businesspeople ====
- Steve Kerbel, businessman, entrepreneur and former 2016 Libertarian presidential candidate
- Robert Sarvis, attorney, businessman, politician and software developer

==== Actors and comedians ====
- Drew Carey, comedian
- Doug Stanhope, comedian, actor, 2008 presidential candidate
- Randy Wayne, actor
- Josh Wolf, comedian, television host
- Teller, of Penn & Teller

==== Athletes and sports figures ====
- Rudy Carpenter, football quarterback
- Hal Gill, retired professional ice hockey player
- Sean Waltman, professional wrestler

==== Musicians and artists ====
- Krist Novoselić, musician, bassist and co-founder of Nirvana

==== Commentators, writers and columnists ====
- Jay Cost, writer for The Weekly Standard
- Matt Welch, editor-in-chief of Reason magazine
- Kmele Foster, co-host of The Independents, political pundit
- Todd Seavey, writer for Splice Today and author

==== Radio hosts ====
- Adrian Wyllie, activist, radio show host, 2014 Libertarian candidate for Governor of Florida and former chairman of Libertarian Party of Florida
- Keith Larson, radio host and political commentator

==== Social and political activists ====
- Ed Lopez, Republican activist and former national vice chairman of the Republican Liberty Caucus
- Richard Winger, publisher and editor of Ballot Access News, political activist and analyst
- Alan Gura, litigator, constitutional lawyer
- Michael Munger, economist

=== John McAfee campaign ===
- Adam Kokesh, talk show host and activist
- John Moore, Nevada assemblyman
- L. Neil Smith, science fiction author and activist
- Joy Waymire, Libertarian presidential candidate

=== Austin Petersen campaign ===
==== Commentators, writers, and columnists ====
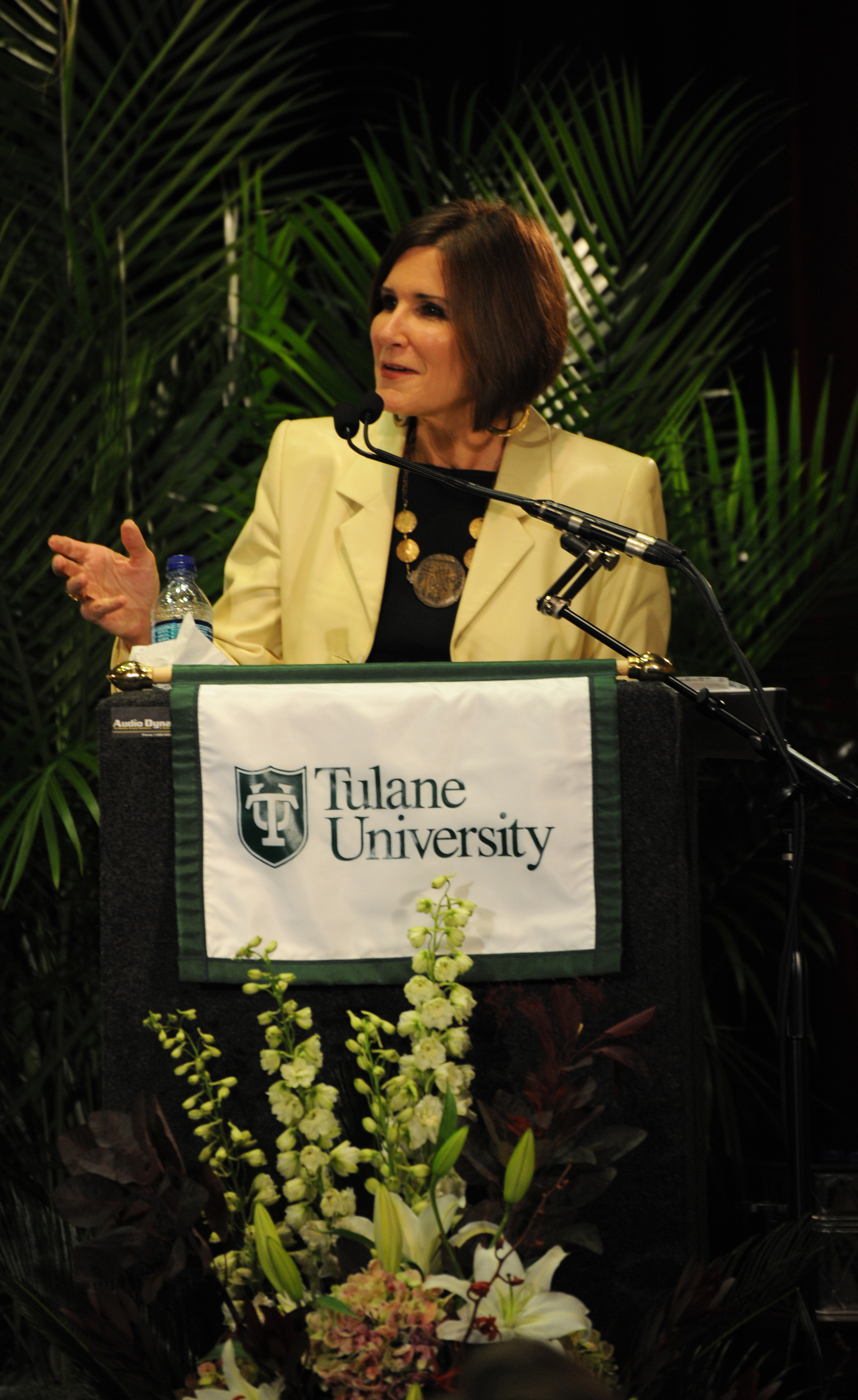
Mary Matalin speaking at a Bipartisan Policy event at Tulane University in 2009

- Erick Erickson, radio host and author
- Nick Fuentes, talk show host
- Mary Matalin, political consultant

==== Others ====
- Sean Haugh, 2002, 2014 and 2016 Libertarian candidate for United States Senate in North Carolina.
- Dave Smith, comedian

== Campaign finance ==
As of March 31, 2016 three candidates had reported their fundraising amounts to the Federal Election Commission; Gary Johnson, John McAfee and Austin Petersen.

| | Campaign committee (as of March 31) | | | | Total spent | Suspended campaign |
| | Money raised | Money spent | Cash on hand | Debt | Total spent | Suspended campaign |
|---|---|---|---|---|---|---|
| Gary Johnson | $278,976 | $243,924 | $35,031 | $0 | $243,924 | Election |
| John McAfee | $8,057 | $7,858 | $149 | $0 | $7,858 | May 29, 2016 |
| Austin Petersen | $112,812 | $95,441 | $17,371 | $0 | $95,441 | May 29, 2016 |

== Vice presidential selection ==
As of May 21, 2016, there were nine vice presidential candidates running.

- Alicia Dearn from Missouri (endorsed by Austin Petersen at Convention)
- William Coley from Tennessee (endorsed by Darryl W. Perry)
- Daniel Hogan from Missouri
- Kerry Douglas McKennon from Texas
- Jeff Mortenson from Mississippi
- Larry Sharpe from New York
- Mark Stewart from Connecticut
- Judd Weiss from California (endorsed by John McAfee)
- Bill Weld from Massachusetts (endorsed by Gary Johnson)

The Libertarian Party's vice presidential candidate is elected by the delegates at the LNC after the presidential nominee is announced. Vice presidential candidates are often endorsed or preferred by presidential candidates, but some have entered without a specific presidential nominee in mind, or a preference from any of them.

Bill Weld, former governor of Massachusetts, was nominated for vice president after having previously been announced as Johnson's intended running mate. The selection proved controversial within the party, but also resulted in a spike in media coverage of the prospective ticket. Two governors running as a ticket attracted attention, in part because it had not happened for any party since the 1948 United States presidential election.

As with Johnson in the presidential nomination, Weld narrowly failed to secure a majority on the first ballot. He was nominated on the second ballot, defeating runner-up Larry Sharpe.

== See also ==
- Gary Johnson 2016 presidential campaign

Debates

- 2016 Libertarian Party presidential debates and forums

Presidential primaries

- 2016 Constitution Party presidential primaries
- 2016 Democratic Party presidential primaries
- 2016 Green Party presidential primaries
- 2016 Republican Party presidential primaries

National Conventions

- 2016 Constitution Party National Convention
- 2016 Libertarian National Convention
- 2016 Green National Convention
- 2016 Democratic National Convention
- 2016 Republican National Convention
