= 2016 United States presidential primaries =

The 2016 United States presidential primaries can refer to:

- 2016 Democratic Party presidential primaries
- 2016 Green Party presidential primaries
- 2016 Libertarian Party presidential primaries
- 2016 Republican Party presidential primaries
