= MIPTV Media Market =

MIPTV
- Product type: Trade show
- Current owner: Reed MIDEM
- Introduced: 1964
- Markets: Worldwide
- Website: MIPTV.com

MIPTV
- Status: active
- Genre: Trade show
- Begins: April
- Venue: London
- Years active: 1964
- Sponsor: Reed MIDEM
- Website: MIPTV.com

MIPTV (French: Marché International des Programmes de Télévision) is an event which takes place annually in Cannes, France, using the facilities and infrastructure which the town has developed over the years to host other important events such as the Cannes Film Festival amongst other events.

It is essentially a content market for co-producing, buying, selling, financing and distributing entertainment content. It provides the people involved in the TV, film, digital and audiovisual content, production and distribution industry a market conference and networking forum to discover future trends and trade content rights on a global level.

This event is very closely related to the MIPCOM event, but retains its distinct focus. The MIPCOM event takes place in the same venue in October each year.

In 2025, the event moved to London and started operating under the name MIP London.

== History ==
MIP-TV was started in Lyon, France, in 1963 three years after MIFED (Mercato internazionale del film e del documentario), the world's first audiovisual market, had started in Milan, Italy. The first MIP-TV was attended by 119 companies from 19 countries.

In 1965, after a one-year hiatus, MIP-TV moved to Cannes, using the town's “old” Palais for the exhibition floors. In 1982 the market moved to the new Palais, while the old one became a hotel. In 1987 the company that organized the market, MIDEM, was sold to the UK's Television South (TVS) for £5 million. Two years later, TVS sold MIDEM to Reed Exhibitions (for a reported $20 million), which renamed it Reed MIDEM.

== Conferences ==
Conference panelists and keynotes include CEOs from all the major global media companies like: Leslie Moonves, CBS (US), Jana Bennett BBC (UK), Gerhard Zeiler RTL Group (Luxembourg), Harry Sloan MGM (US), Subhash Chandra ZEE Networks (India), Hyun-Oh Yoo SK Communications/Cyworld (Korea), Paula Wagner at United Artists (US), Ronnie Screwvala UTV (India), Philip Rosedale Second Life (US), Ben Silverman NBC (US), Emilio Azcarraga Televisa (Mexico), Mike Volpi Joost (US), Ken Rutkowski, Wayne Scholes Redtouch Media (US) KenRadio Broadcasting (US). Vertice360º (SPAIN)

== Events hosted at MIPTV ==
=== MIPFormats ===
Since 2010, MIPTV has launched MIPFormats, "the pre-MIPTV formats conference & pitching showcase" that gathers producers, commissioners, buyers, distributors and aspiring creators of breakthrough formats. The event is organised in association with C21FormatsLab.

In 2011, 665 participants and 401 companies from 57 countries came to MIPFormats.

=== MIPDoc ===
MIPDoc is where international buyers, sellers, producers and commissioners of documentary and factual programmes screen new content and do business. MIPDoc calls itself "the international showcase for documentary screenings". Key MIPDoc 2011 figures:

- 27,097 screenings
- 1,399 programmes
- 767 participants
- 58 countries

== MIPTV 2010 attendance figures ==
- Participants: 11,500
- Buyers: 4,000
- Exhibitors: 1,500
- Countries: 107

By country:

- Europe: 54%
- North America: 17%
- Asia/Pacific: 15%
- Africa/Middle East: 7%
- South&Latin America: 3%

== Represented industry sectors ==
- Programme buyers
- Distributors and sales agents
- Programme producers
- Finance partners
- Commissioners
- Platform owners
- Internet and mobile players
- Solutions providers
- Advertisers
- Major global brands
- Licensing executives
- Advertising and media agencies
