= The Steve Cochran Show =

The Steve Cochran Show is the title of two talk shows on 720 WGN AM in Chicago, Illinois hosted by Steve Cochran. The original, airing in the afternoon drive, ran from February 2000 until its cancellation in June 2010. The current is Cochran's second stint at WGN, this time as morning-drive host, which began in September 2013. It airs from 5-10 a.m.

== Show features ==
=== Show introduction ===
At the beginning of the show, Steve starts the show by having a passer-by on Michigan Avenue read an introduction. The introduction typically references a current event and incorporates a fictitious piece of trivia about Steve (referred to as "this man") at the end. The introduction is concluded with the phrase, "Here's Steve Cochran!". The show's theme music follows the introduction.

A typical introduction might be:

- "Audrey Tautou was recently announced to be Tom Hanks' co-star in the upcoming movie The Da Vinci Code. This man was once selected to be Tom's co-star in Cast Away but was replaced by a volleyball at the last minute. Here's Steve Cochran!"

=== Kid of the Week ===
Once a week, Steve honors a "Kid of the Week" by speaking with a kid who has "done something that is super, spectacular, and fantastic".

== See also ==
- WGN Radio
- John Williams
