= 2016 Constitution Party presidential primaries =

← 2012	March 8–15, 2016	2020 →

339½ delegates to the Constitution Party National Convention

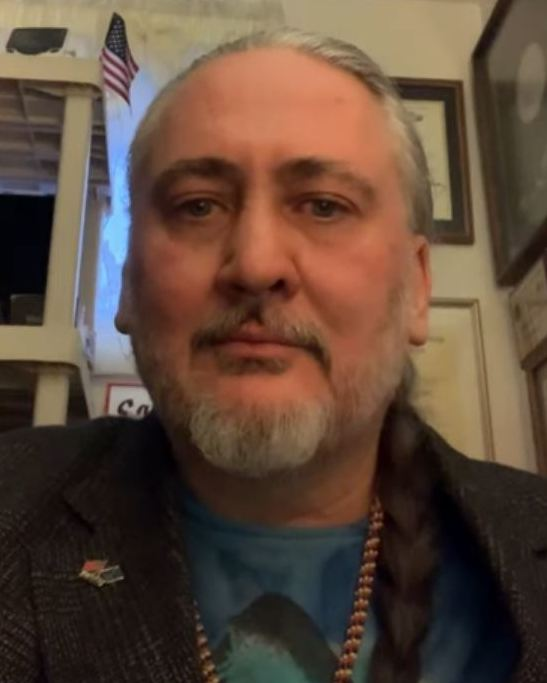

Candidate	Uncommitted	Scott Copeland
Home state	n/a	Texas
Contests won	1	1
Popular vote	691	250
Percentage	58.8%	21.3%
Candidate	J. R. Myers	Patrick Anthony Ockander
Home state	Alaska	Texas
Contests won	0	0
Popular vote	139	95
Percentage	11.8%	8.1%
First place by first-instance vote
Scott Copeland (1)
Uncommitted (1)
No contest (48)
Previous Constitution Party nominee
Virgil Goode
Constitution Party nominee
Darrell Castle

The 2016 Constitution Party presidential primaries were 2 electoral contests, held in the states of Idaho and Missouri, by the Constitution Party during the 2016 election season in order to allocate delegates from those states to the 2016 Constitution Party National Convention.

== Candidates ==
Candidates are sorted by delegate votes received at the 2016 Constitution Party National Convention.

Candidate	Profession	State	Campaign	Popular vote	Contests won	Delegates	Ref
Darrell Castle	Attorney; Nominee for Vice President of the United States in 2008	Tennessee	(Campaign • Website); Running mate: Scott Bradley	0	0	184	
Scott Copeland	Minister; Former Pastor	Texas		250	1	103.5	
J.R. Myers	Chairman of the Constitution Party of Alaska	Alaska		138	0	9	
Patrick Anthony Ockander	Author	Texas		95	0	0	

== Results ==
=== National ===

Scott Copeland J.R. Myers Patrick Anthony Ockander
Uncommitted Tie No votes

=== Idaho primary ===
The Constitution Party of Idaho held its primary on March 8.

Election results, by county, of the 2016 Constitution presidential primary in Idaho Scott Copeland J.R. Myers Patrick Anthony Ockander Tie No votes

Idaho Constitution Party presidential primary, 2016
Candidate	Popular vote		Pledged delegates
Candidate	Count	Percentage	Pledged delegates
Scott Copeland	250	51.7%	8
J.R. Myers	139	28.7%	0
Patrick Anthony Ockander	95	19.6%	0
Total:	484	100%	8

Key:	Withdrew prior to contest

=== Missouri primary ===
Election results, by county, of the 2016 Constitution presidential primary in Missouri Uncommitted No votes

The Constitution Party of Missouri held its primary on March 15. No candidate made it on the ballot, and the only option for voters was "Uncommitted".

Missouri Constitution Party presidential primary, 2016
Candidate	Popular vote	
Candidate	Count	Percentage
Uncommitted	691	100%
Total:	691	100%

== See also ==
Presidential primaries

- 2016 Democratic Party presidential primaries
- 2016 Green Party presidential primaries
- 2016 Libertarian Party presidential primaries
- 2016 Republican Party presidential primaries
