= Graham Bensinger =

American journalist

- Born: August 17, 1986 (age 40); St. Louis, Missouri
- Occupations: Sports reporter and journalist
- Known for: In Depth with Graham Bensinger

Graham Bensinger is an American journalist known for his show In Depth with Graham Bensinger. Bensinger is known for interviewing a number of personalities in American sports, and won an Emmy for an interview he did with Mike Tyson.

== Early life ==
Bensinger was born to Jewish parents Vicki and Scott Bensinger. Bensinger began studying broadcast journalism at Syracuse University's S.I. Newhouse School of Public Communications, but left midway through his second year to pursue broadcasting full-time in 2008.

== Career ==
Bensinger started his career in the eighth grade in St. Louis, going to a local library and looking up 50 former major league baseball players' home address, sending mailed letters and receiving phone calls (from Will Clark, Bob Feller, Ernie Banks, Tim McCarver) on his parents' home landline, as an internet radio show, G Sport Radio.

Bensinger launched his career with an internet-based sports radio station he developed in eighth grade. He also began buying time on St. Louis AM radio KSLG to talk sports. In 2003, his show began airing on Sporting News Radio's St. Louis station, and moved to ESPN Radio's St. Louis station the following year.

During his junior year of high school, Bensinger interviewed O. J. Simpson. He set up a video camera, and the footage ended up on Good Morning America. Bensinger was subsequently interviewed by Diane Sawyer, in addition to appearing on cable outlets.

A year after the O. J. Simpson interview, Bensinger began writing for ESPN's website. Following his senior year of high school, he sat with Simpson again, and was able to sell the interview to ESPN as part of their E-Ticket series. This started a three-and-a-half-year-long relationship between Bensinger and ESPN, with Bensinger continuing to write, appear on television, podcast and work as an ESPNU sideline reporter.

In 2009, Bensinger began partnering with NBCSports.com on a long-form video interview program, portions of which would air on NBC TV platforms.

After freelancing as a long-form interviewer for ESPN and NBC Sports, Bensinger debuted his own show in the fall of 2010. The first two seasons of In Depth with Graham Bensinger were a one-man operation where he handled all aspects of business and production himself. Bensinger staffed up for season three and expanded to over-the-air network syndication at the start of his show's fourth season, airing on ABC, NBC, CBS and FOX affiliates across the U.S., and the show is now run by a crew of ten. Previously, the show aired solely on regional sports networks.

In Depth with Graham Bensinger is now in its 15th season (2025), which began with Bensinger taking a trip to India to speak with cricketer Virat Kohli. According to the show's website, it reaches three million broadcast viewers, and 2.5 million digital views per episode, on average. Nielsen has calculated that the show averages 1.5 million weekly viewers. Internationally, the show airs via ESPN International, BT Sport, FOX Sports International, in-flight on Emirates, across 170 countries and territories on American Forces Network and digitally on Bensinger's YouTube channel.

Bensinger is an Emmy Award winner.
