= Gary Johnson 2016 presidential campaign =

American political campaign

Gary Johnson 2016
- Campaign: 2016 United States presidential election
- Candidate: Gary Johnson; Former Governor of New Mexico (1995–2003); William Weld; Former Governor of Massachusetts (1991–97)
- Affiliation: Libertarian Party
- Status: Announced: January 6, 2016; Nominated: May 29, 2016; Lost election: November 8, 2016
- Headquarters: Salt Lake City, Utah
- Key people: William Weld (Running mate); Ron Nielson (campaign manager); Mike McCauley (treasurer)
- Receipts: US$12,193,984 (12−31−16)
- Slogan(s): Our Best America Yet; Live Free #TeamGov; Be Libertarian with me You In?

Website
- Official website

The 2016 presidential campaign of Gary Johnson, the 29th Governor of New Mexico, was announced on January 6, 2016, for the nomination of the Libertarian Party (or LP) for President of the United States. He officially won the nomination on May 29, 2016, at the Libertarian National Convention in Orlando, Florida, receiving 56% of the vote on the second ballot. Former Massachusetts Governor William Weld was endorsed by Johnson for the Libertarian vice-presidential nomination, which he also received on May 29, 2016.

Johnson and Weld formed the first ticket of any party to feature two governors since the 1948 presidential election. They received 3.3% of the vote, totaling nearly 4.5 million, dwarfing Johnson's 2012 popular vote total and marking the Libertarians' most successful presidential run to date and the most successful third-party candidacy since Ross Perot in 1996.

== Background ==
Johnson ran as the Libertarian presidential nominee in the 2012 election. In that race, he finished with the third highest popular vote total, nearly 1.3 million votes, and garnered nearly 1% of the popular vote. Johnson's vote total was the highest received by any LP candidate – for any office – in the party's history. Shortly after the election, Johnson began to express interest in running for the Libertarian nomination again in the 2016 election.

== Campaign ==
Original logo

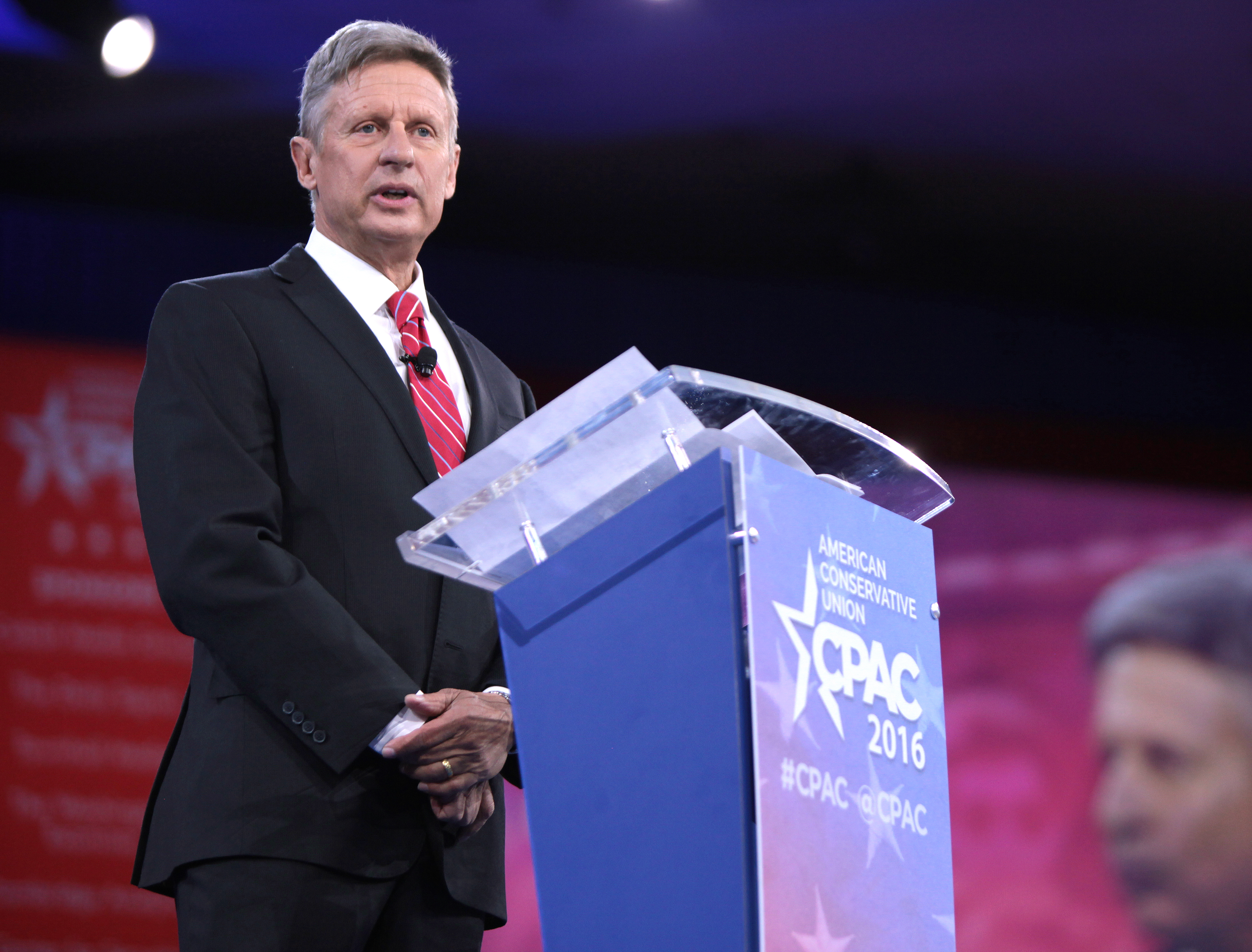
Gary Johnson speaking at the 2016 CPAC in Washington, D.C.

Johnson formally announced his candidacy for the 2016 Libertarian presidential nomination, in an interview with Neil Cavuto on the Fox Business Network program Coast to Coast, on January 6, 2016. He subsequently began participating in a series of debates with the other candidates seeking the Libertarian nomination, held at state LP conventions around the country leading up the Libertarian National Convention over Memorial Day weekend in Orlando, Florida. Johnson took a moderate position in a debate field of more hardline libertarian candidates, which led to an occasionally hostile reception from the audience when he spoke up in favor of certain government programs and regulations, including a moment that gained viral notoriety where he was booed for expressing support for testing and licensing drivers.

On March 3, 2016, Johnson addressed the Conservative Political Action Conference in Washington, D.C., touting himself as the third-party option for anti-Trump Republicans, and saying that the Libertarian Party would be the only third party able to place its nominee on the ballot in all 50 states in 2016 due to ballot access hurdles.

Johnson's campaign attracted increased attention as a possible vehicle for the Stop Trump movement's votes in the general election, once Donald Trump became the presumptive Republican nominee. Johnson has branded Trump's political views as authoritarian.

On March 15, 2016, Johnson won the North Carolina Libertarian primary with 42% of the vote, ahead of "No Preference" at 35%, with other candidates all polling below 6%. On March 1, 2016, Johnson won the Libertarian Party of Minnesota caucus with 76% of the vote.

On March 29, 2016, Johnson attended the first nationally televised pre-nomination convention Libertarian Party presidential debate, hosted by Fox Business Network, on John Stossel's show Stossel. The two-hour debate was divided into two one hour segments which were televised on April 1 and 8 at 9:00 Eastern Time. The debate featured Johnson, along with Austin Petersen and John McAfee.

Following Ted Cruz's withdrawal from the Republican primary elections and Trump becoming the Republican Party's presumptive nominee, it was widely reported that online searches for "Gary Johnson" and "Libertarian Party" spiked sharply on Google.

In early May, some commentators opined that Johnson was moderate enough to pull votes away from both Hillary Clinton and Donald Trump who were considered controversial and polarizing by many voters. Johnson also began to get time on national television, being invited on ABC News, NBC News, CBS News, CNN, Fox News, MSNBC, Bloomberg, and many other networks.

=== Nomination ===
On May 18, Johnson announced that he had chosen former Republican Massachusetts Governor William Weld to be his running mate.

On the first ballot of the 2016 Libertarian National Convention on May 29, 2016, Johnson earned 49.5% of the vote. On the second ballot, he won the nomination with 55.8% of the vote.

=== Post-nomination ===
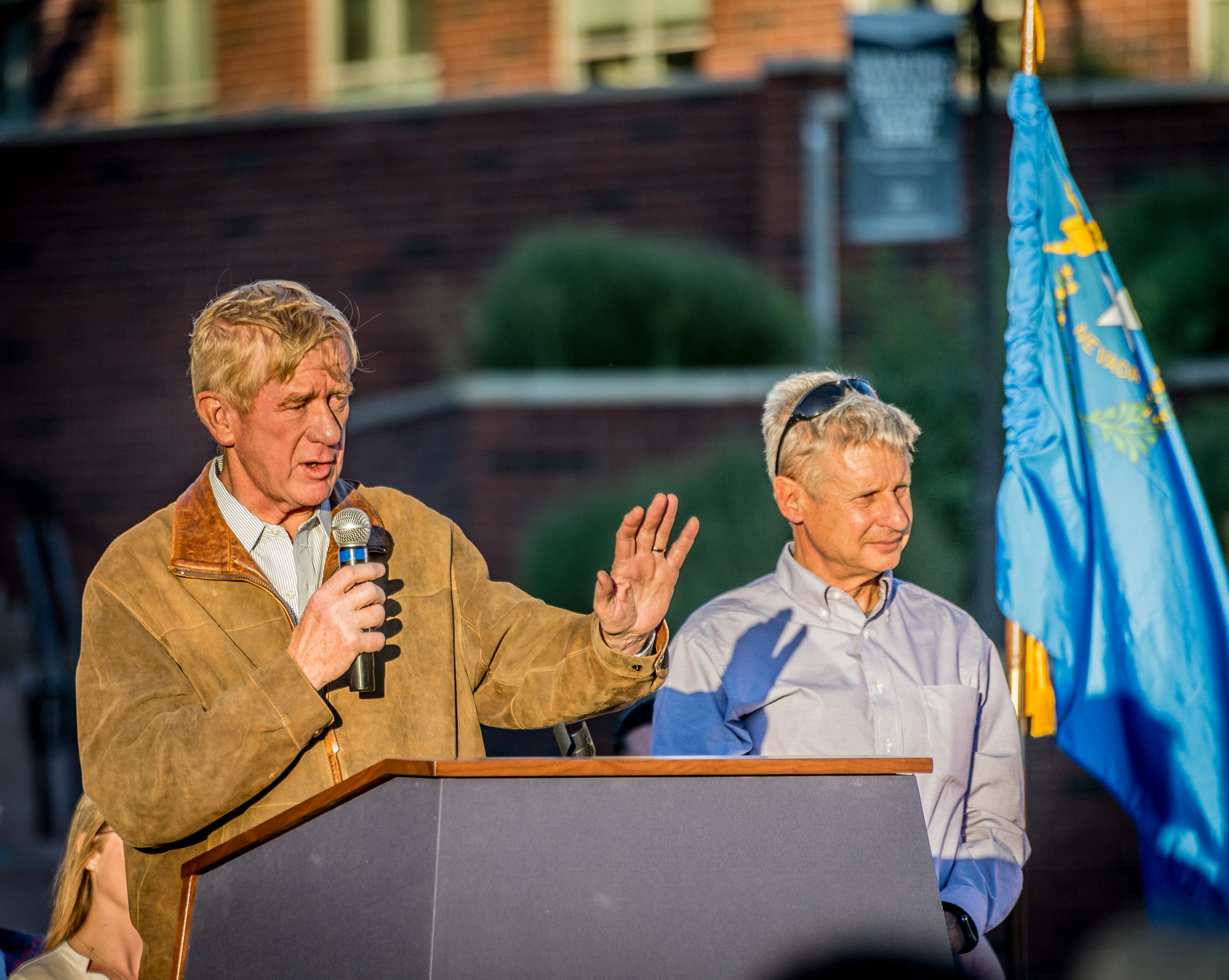
William Weld and Gary Johnson at a rally in Reno, Nevada, August 2016

Mitt Romney, the 2012 Republican presidential nominee and also a former Republican governor of Massachusetts, said he would consider supporting the Johnson–Weld ticket. Romney remarked that, "if Bill Weld were at the top of the ticket, it would be very easy" for him to do so. On June 22, Johnson and Weld participated in a nationally televised Town Hall hosted by CNN. On August 3, Johnson and Weld returned to CNN for a second nationally televised town hall. It was viewed by over 1.61 million people.

Beginning on August 12, a pro-Johnson political action committee, America Deserves Better PAC, began running television ads in Maine. On August 17, Johnson and Weld attended a Libertarian town hall hosted by Fusion. In August, Johnson's poll numbers began to approach the 15% threshold necessary to make him the first third-party candidate in recent history to participate in the broadcast, fall presidential debates. Johnson also began doing major rallies. On August 5, about 500 people turned out to a rally in Reno, Nevada. The following day he attended an event at the University of Utah.

On August 17, Johnson and Weld attended a town hall, attended by about 600 people, at the Wertheim Performing Arts Center in Miami, Florida. The following day, Johnson and Weld held a Las Vegas, Nevada, rally at The Foundry SLS Las Vegas. The campaign held events in Burlington Vermont, Concord, New Hampshire, Lewiston, Maine, where pro-Johnson super-PAC ads were being aired, and Boston, Massachusetts, home of Bill Weld. The campaign also added a brunch with Johnson and Weld in Portland, Maine. Over the weekend, hundreds of people attended each of the rallies.

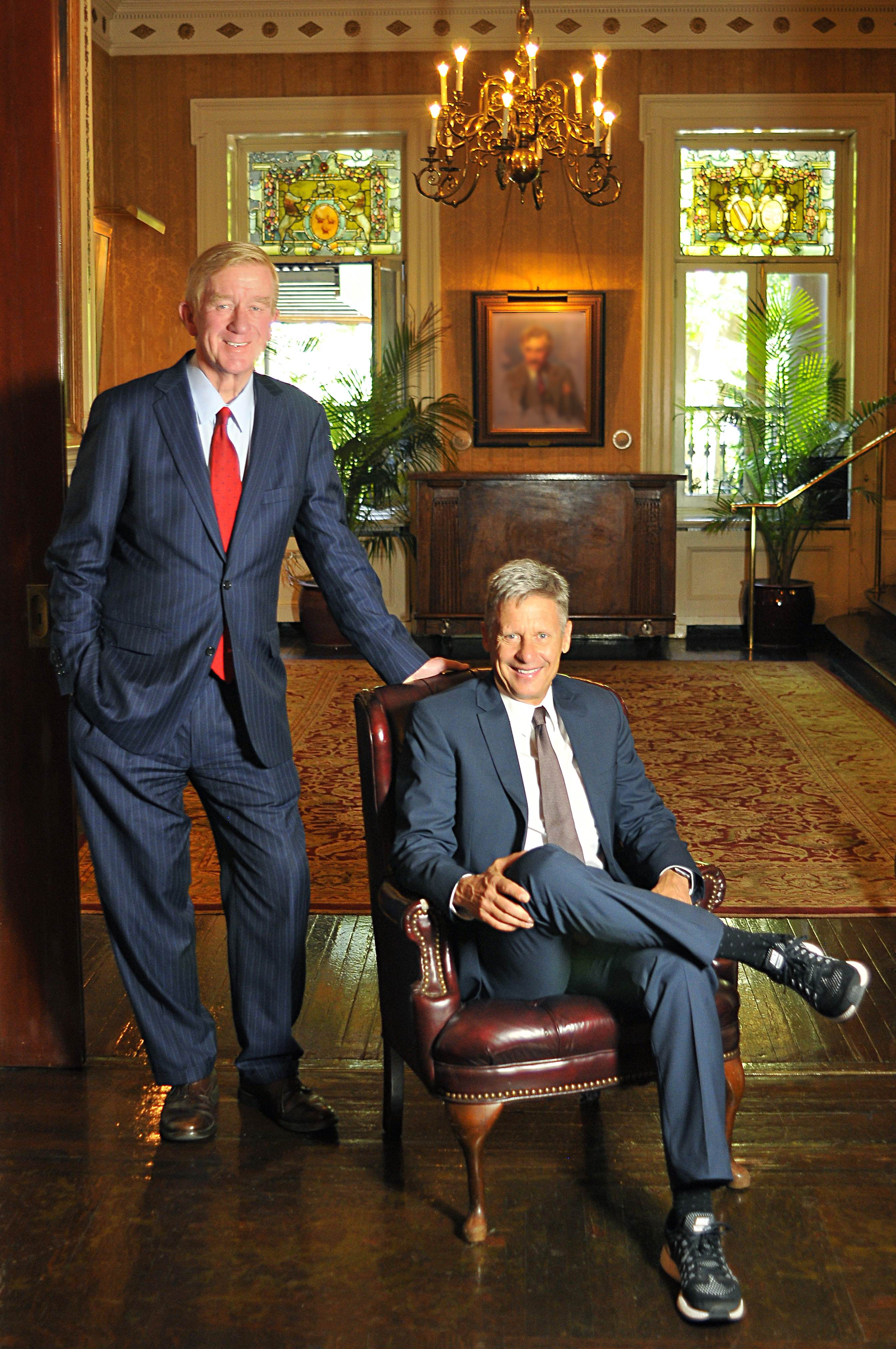
Gary Johnson and William Weld

In early September the Gary Johnson campaign began its first wave of paid TV ads. They were targeted at the Western states of Colorado, Nevada, New Mexico, Oregon, Utah, and Washington and the northeast state of New Hampshire. Purple PAC began airing pro-Johnson television ads in August. In early September, Americans Deserve Better super-PAC announced that support for Johnson has nearly doubled in Maine's 2nd congressional district.

In response to Johnson's growing poll numbers, the Hillary Clinton campaign and Democratic allies increased their criticism against Johnson in September 2016, warning that "a vote for a third party is a vote for Donald Trump" and deploying Senator Bernie Sanders (Clinton's former primary rival and now-supporter) to win over voters who might be considering voting for Johnson or for Green Party candidate Jill Stein. Democrats circulated "embarrassing videos of Johnson" and directed more resources toward winning "young voters and left-leaning independents" – a key Johnson demographic.

=== Comments on foreign policy ===
In September and October 2016, Johnson made a series of errors when facing questions about foreign policy. On September 8, on MSNBC's Morning Joe, he was asked by panelist Mike Barnicle, "What would you do, if you were elected, about Aleppo?" (referring to the war-torn city of Aleppo in Syria). Johnson responded, "And what is Aleppo?" When an "incredulous" Barnicle said "You're kidding... Aleppo is in Syria – it's the epicenter of the refugee crisis," Johnson responded by saying that "the only way that we deal with Syria is to join hands with Russia to diplomatically bring that at an end." Johnson criticized U.S. support for the Free Syrian Army and Kurdish forces and stated that the "mess" in Syria was "the result of regime change that we end up supporting. And, inevitably, these regime changes have led to a less-safe world." Johnson's "what is Aleppo?" question drew widespread attention, much of it negative. Later that day, Johnson said that he had "blanked" and that he did "understand the dynamics of the Syrian conflict – I talk about them every day," but that he immediately thought that Barnicle's reference to "Aleppo" was in relation to "an acronym, not the Syrian conflict."

During a CNBC town hall television broadcast on September 28, Johnson was asked by moderator Chris Matthews, "Who's your favorite foreign leader?" Johnson at first stated "the former president of Mexico" but could not identify him by name. Johnson then stated: "I guess I'm having an Aleppo moment" and "I'm having a brain freeze." Johnson's failure to identify a foreign leader that he admired attracted media attention – including a New York Times article with the headline, "Gary Johnson Can't Name a Single Foreign Leader." Johnson later stood by his reluctance to "point out an elected leader, foreign leader that I admire," saying in a CNN interview, "I held a lot of people in this country on pedestals and then I get to meet them up front and personal and I find out that they're all about getting re-elected, that they're not about issues, a lot of empty suits that I held up on pedestals."

In speaking about the Syrian Civil War in an interview with The New York Times in October 2016, Johnson drew a moral equivalence between the Assad regime's intentional killing of hundreds of thousands of Syrian civilians with the accidental killing of civilians by U.S.-backed forces. Johnson criticized Clinton, the former secretary of state, for what he characterized as her excessively interventionist leanings, and suggested that Clinton, as former secretary of state, was at least partially responsible for the crisis in Syria. Johnson also lamented the fact that the public placed pressure on U.S. leaders to "get tough on this stuff, on these atrocities."

In the same interview, when asked if he knew the name of North Korea's leader, Johnson responded "I do" but refused to name Kim Jong-un when pressed. The "misstep" prompted media attention and was described as "embarrassing to the campaign."

=== Polling ===
==== Libertarian primaries ====
The Libertarian Party conducted presidential primaries in only a few states. All delegates to the Libertarian National Convention were unpledged, meaning that they could vote for the candidate of their choice. In pre-nomination preference polls conducted by state Libertarian Parties, Johnson won first place in most states preceding the Libertarian National Convention at the end of May.

Of the states which conducted a non-binding Libertarian presidential primary, Johnson won in North Carolina, Nebraska, and in the Minnesota caucuses. Due to early deadlines, he was not on the ballot in Missouri, where 'Uncommitted' received the most votes.

==== General election ====
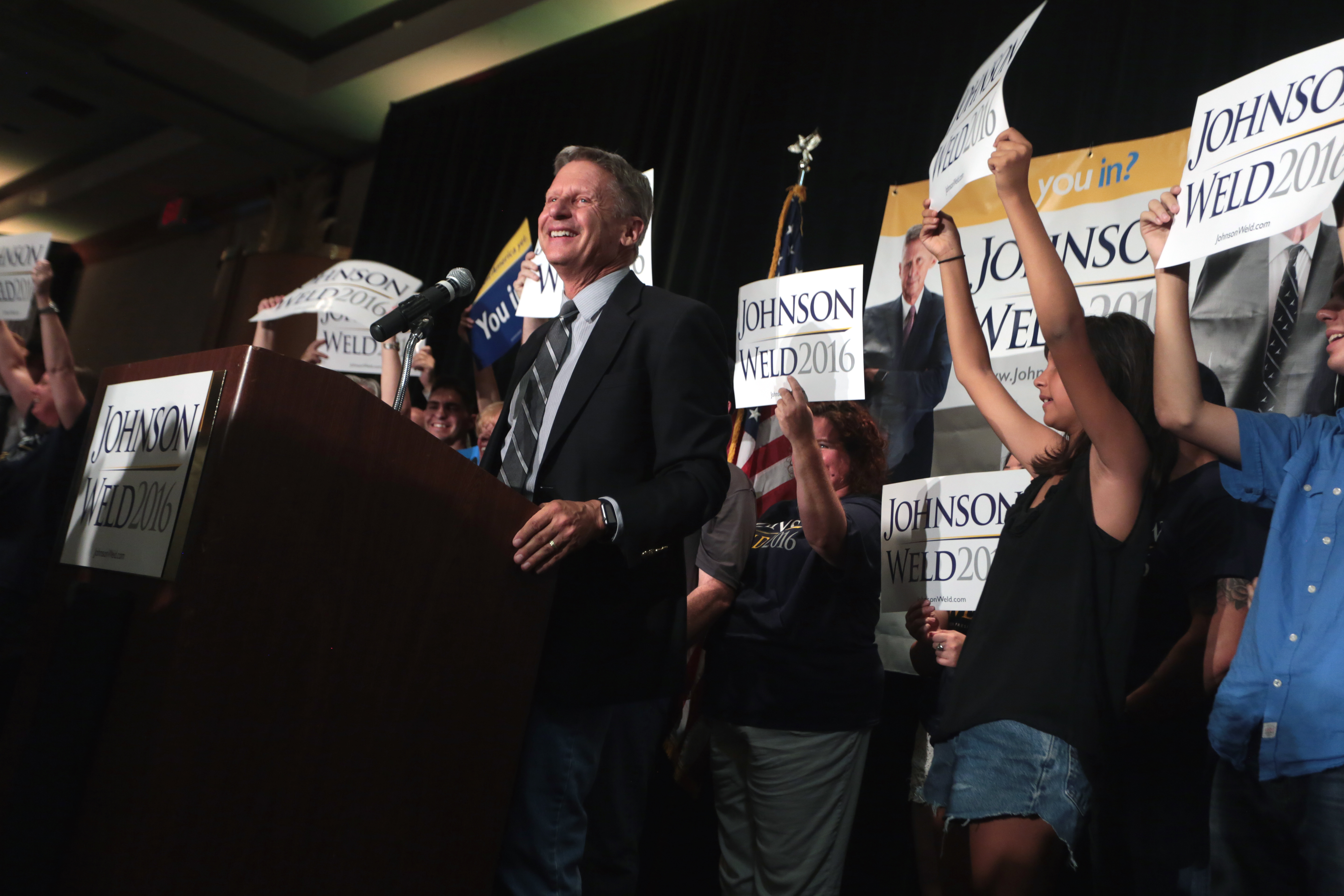
Johnson at a rally in Phoenix, Arizona, October 1, 2016

In late September 2016, Johnson's support was placed at 8.6% by the RealClearPolitics average of presidential polls and at 7.9% by the FiveThirtyEight polls-only forecasting model. However, by election day Johnson's support was down to 4.7% on the RealClearPolitics average and 4.8% on FiveThirtyEight. Johnson's highest polling nationally in an individual poll was 13 percent against Clinton and Trump.

A Washington Post–SurveyMonkey 50-state poll was conducted online between August 9 and September 1 found that Gary Johnson was polling at 10% or higher in 42 states, and at 15% or higher in 15 states (Johnson received 25% in his home state of New Mexico and 23% in Utah).

A poll conducted in mid-August by the Pew Research Center found that Johnson was supported by about 10% of registered voters. Of Johnson supporters, more than 60% identified as independent and more than 70% were younger than fifty years old. Johnson's supporters were evenly divided between men and women.

=== Presidential debates ===
A major goal of the Johnson campaign was to secure the necessary polling-support threshold of 15%, set by the Commission on Presidential Debates, to be invited to participate in the televised presidential debates alongside Clinton and Trump.

In late 2015, Johnson and Green Party candidate Jill Stein, both represented by attorney Bruce Fein, filed a lawsuit in the U.S. District Court for the District of Columbia, seeking to compel their inclusion in the debates. The case was dismissed in August 2016, with Judge Rosemary Collyer finding that the plaintiffs had no viable legal claim.

On August 5, the editorial board of the Chicago Tribune called on polling organizations to "acknowledge" Johnson, giving him an opportunity to garner the necessary level of support to participate in the presidential debates. The Boston Herald followed on September 7. Former Governors Mitt Romney, Arnold Schwarzenegger, and Mitch Daniels, without endorsing Johnson, called for him to be in the debates, as did commentator Joseph Steinberg.

On September 16, the commission announced the official invitation of both Clinton and Trump to participate in the first debate to be held on September 26 at Hofstra University, but Johnson did not meet the established criteria, and would not be a participant in the debate. It was also announced that Mike Pence and Tim Kaine would be participating in the only scheduled vice presidential debate, to take place at Longwood University on October 4, and Weld did not reach the cutoff.

=== Social media campaign ===
Balanced Rebellion is a campaign advertisement and campaign project launched by AlternativePAC, the political action committee supporting Gary Johnson for President of the United States in the 2016 general election. The website enables voters who dislike both major party candidates, but have a slight preference for Hillary Clinton or Donald Trump, to pair their vote with a voter feeling a slight but opposite preference, so that both voters – matched by the website and known to one another only by first name – can vote for Johnson without feeling that they are helping throw the election to a major party candidate they oppose.

According to journalist Brian Doherty, editor of Reason magazine, the project is intended to appeal to voters who, "while disliking both Hillary Clinton and Donald Trump, didn't want to feel that their third party vote helped make the one they hated more win."

==== Video content ====
The five minute video ad, on the website of AlternativePAC and Facebook, features an Abraham Lincoln character called "Dead Abe Lincoln" who explains the concept of the website, comparing Trump to someone's drunk racist uncle and Clinton as a corrupt politician trying to "make millions on political favors." He likens the United States to Gotham City, in the Batman comics, comparing Clinton with the Mob and Trump with the Joker. Johnson is then likened to Batman. Dead Abe Lincoln goes on to promote Johnson as a candidate, pointing out that he was popular as the Republican Governor of a Democratic state where he reduced taxes and that he wants to protect personal privacy. Dead Abe Lincoln also makes the point that Abraham Lincoln was a third party candidate, a point that has been criticized on the grounds that the Republican party, while it was a new party, was not precisely analogous to a modern third party. The video, promoted on Facebook by AlternativePAC at an initial cost of $330,000, soon went viral, with 9 million views by August 9, and 17.3 million views by September 7. The Balanced Rebellion video in which "Dead Abe Lincoln" endorses Johnson, and offers a vote trading solution for disaffected never-Trump and never-Hillary voters, has been the most widely viewed viral video of any candidate in the 2016 campaign. The video was produced by the Harmon Brothers, four brothers who work together as comedy producers.

=== Fundraising and campaign expenditures ===
==== By the Johnson campaign ====
From January to June 2016, Johnson raised a total of $1.4 million, far surpassing Johnson's fundraising in his 2012 run. (Johnson's 2012 presidential campaign remains about $1.9 million in debt.)

After announcing him as his running mate, Johnson stated that much of the tasks of fundraising would be delegated to Gov. Weld (who has stronger fundraising experience than Johnson). May 18, Johnson told the Associated Press that his campaign had just $35,000 in the bank at the end of March, and that he hoped his newly announced running mate, Gov. Weld, would, "be a huge influence when it comes to fundraising."

When asked by CNN's Victor Blackwell on June 11 if the campaign was on track to raise the 20 to 30 million dollars believed to be necessary for him to have a competitive presidential bid, Johnson said,

It is a process, so first you got to engage in dialogue and that dialogue is actually occurring. There has to be interest. That interest is there. Has that $20 to $30 million transpired? Meaning have checks been written? Not to this point, but it is a process. And it looks pretty bright."

Talking with reporters at the 2016 Democratic National Convention, William Weld stated that he believed that some very large potential donors were waiting to see Johnson hit 15% in the polls before they donated to the campaign.

In July the comedian Drew Carey hosted a Johnson fundraiser at his home, which 150 guests attended. Organizers of Carey's fundraiser expected to raise $100,000 in support of Johnson's campaign.

On August 3, Johnson announced that his campaign had raised more than $1,000,000 from in a two-week period, with contributions coming from over 20,000 individual donors. He also announced the launch of the campaign's #15for15 fundraising initiative.

==== Online fundraising ====
In the month of August the Johnson campaign managed to see its greatest online fundraising totals, receiving over 2 million dollars in online contributions. During an online "money bomb" fundraising effort in the first two weeks of August, the campaign stated that over 90,000 people contributed, and that the average contribution was $32. In August 2016, Johnson became the first third-party presidential candidate to raise $5 million in a single month since at least 1996.

From January to late May 2016, the Johnson campaign had spent about $334,000; more than 70% of expenditures were paid to the Utah-based Liberty Consulting Service, the consulting firm of Ron Nielson, Johnson's campaign manager. By August 2016, the Johnson campaign had spent about $15,000 on general-election television advertisements. The Johnson campaign's expenditures in August 2016 totaled $3.7 million, bringing its cash-on-hand to about $2.5 million. Some 49% of August expenditures ($1.8 million) were made to the Utah-based advertising agency Evan Twede, Inc.; $550,000 to Liberty Consulting, and slightly more than $250,000 for Facebook advertisements.

The campaign utilized the crowdfunding website Fundly to raise tens of thousands of dollars in contributions.

July 18, 2016, the campaign released an ad announcing a fundraising initiative dubbed the Johnson–Weld Money Comet. Donations for the initiative were submitted through a webpage that was created specifically for the initiative. The initiative met its initial goal of $25,000 within a day. Afterwards, the goal increased to $100,000 which was achieved on July 20, 2016. Within a week of its launch, the initiative had already received more than $200,000 in donations (including a single-day high of $100,000).

On July 18, 2016, Johnson announced another fundraising initiative, “Today, we are announcing a #15for15 money bomb campaign to get in the debates,"... "Our goal: raise $1.5 million on August 15th to get to 15% in the polls.” The goal of the initiative was to have supporters pledge to donate to the campaign on August 15 in order to create a "money bomb", a single-day from which Johnson can announce a multi-million dollar fundraising haul. The initiative aimed to have 100,000 individuals pledge to donate $15 or more. On August 8 Johnson said that 40,000 supporters had already pledged to participate. The initiative managed to surpass its goal and raised 1.7 million dollars on August 15. There were reports that Johnson was managing to raise more than $1,300 per minute, a rate not seen since Ron Paul's grassroots money bomb efforts.

==== By Libertarian-aligned super PACs ====
Johnson received the support of two Libertarian-aligned super PACs, Purple PAC (founded by Ed Crane) and Americans Deserve Better (chiefly funded by Jeff Yass). As of August 2016, the super PACs combined spent about $100,000 on advertising in support of the Johnson/Weld campaign

After Johnson's nomination, Matt Kibbe announced the formation of the "AlternativePAC" in support of Johnson's campaign. Kibbe previously headed "Concerned American Voters", a Super PAC that had supported Rand Paul’s presidential campaign. Chris Rufer, founder of The Morning Star Company, donated $500,000 to Alternative PAC. Rufer gave the PAC donations of $50,000 on June 9 and $450,000 on June 30. It had earlier been reported that Rufer had pledged to give at least 1 million dollars to outside groups supporting Johnson's campaign. June 30 Kenneth Peterson, founder and CEO of the Columbia Ventures Corporation, gave $30,000 to the PAC. Overall, in the 2016 election cycle AlternativePAC received $1,386,540 in contributions and spent $1,310,578.

Americans Deserve Better is a PAC created to support Johnson's campaign. Its web domain is Vote for the Adults. The Group was led by Geoff Neale, former National Chair of the Libertarian National Committee. In the second week of August 2016 it began running television and radio ads supporting Johnson in Maine's 2nd congressional district with the intention of running them for two weeks before conducting polls to determine if the ads they ran proved to be effective. The group was reported to have reserved nearly $62,000 worth of TV time in the Bangor and Presque Isle markets (including ad-buys on WAGM and WVII totaling more than $20,000 as well as cable ads). The group has also said that it will run radio ads.

Shortly after Johnson secured the party nomination, Cato Institute founder Ed Crane announced that he would be rebooting "Purple PAC", a super-PAC that had previously supported Rand Paul’s presidential campaign, to serve as a pro-Johnson organization. The "Purple PAC" previously had raised $3 million. Many of these funds still remained unspent, as Paul suspended his campaign early-on in the Republican primaries. April 15, 2016, Purple PAC had reported having $363,252 on-hand. After being rebooted to support Johnson, Purple PAC received 25 individual contributions of more than $200.

June 12, 2016 The Boston Globe reported on Socially Liberal and Fiscally Conservative PAC, a newly founded SuperPAC that would both assist in the campaign's fundraising efforts and make ad-buys in the future. The PAC was founded by R.J. Lyman, an executive at ML Strategies (William Weld's former firm). Major advisors to the PAC include Trevor Potter and Matt Sanderson. Both Potter and Sanderson previously worked as counsels to John McCain's 2008 presidential campaign, and worked with Stephen Colbert on his Colbert Super PAC in 2012. Sanderson also was involved in Romney-supporting PACs in 2012, and worked as a counsel to Rand Paul's presidential campaign earlier in the 2016 election cycle.

== The "spoiler" controversy ==
=== Prior to the election ===
Johnson himself accepted being called a spoiler at one point at the election. He said: "I hope I'm a spoiler, because I believe you go from being irrelevant to being a spoiler to being a factor" and "I'm really proud of the fact that I'm offering up that principled vote". Some media outlets also compared Johnson's potential role in the 2016 election to Ralph Nader's in the 2000 election.

Conservative magazine National Review stated that "if the presidential debates wind up convincing many voters that both Trump and Hillary are unacceptable, then Johnson's support could stabilize or even rise. If that happens, any increase in his support is likely to hurt Hillary more."

The Washington Post editorial board wrote in an article named "Do Gary Johnson supporters really want to help Trump win?":

Did Mr. Johnson learn much from his two terms as governor of New Mexico, or from his previous national presidential campaign? Does he prepare for major interviews – let alone for being president? ... Do ideological libertarians really want this man to represent their movement? Does his loopy campaign bring credibility to their political philosophy? ... Does Mr. Johnson's running mate, former Massachusetts governor William Weld, who is much sharper, really want to help Donald Trump win – and be remembered as the Ralph Nader of 2016? Mr. Johnson takes more support from Hillary Clinton in three- and four-way polls than he does from Mr. Trump. He could swing Colorado or New Hampshire into the Trump column.

When The Nation endorsed Hillary Clinton for president, the magazine's staff expressed while they respect the challenge third parties have raised to a frequently dysfunctional two-party system, 2016 was not an ordinary election as in an ordinary election strategic voting only requires swing-state voters to choose between "the lesser of two evils", so it was needed to reconsider the balance between expressing their own disgust and diminishing the size of Trump's repudiation. The magazine also expressed their disagreement with Johnson's "penchant for privatization and survival-of-the-fittest economics" as a viable way of government.

Michael Tomasky for The Daily Beast weighted the contradictions of "the libertarian live-and-let-live credo" stating that it doesn't apply "just to young people who'd like to blow a doob in a public park", but also to polluting corporations, corporations and individuals who want to make unlimited dark money contributions to political campaigns, the forces pushing free trade, employers who don't want to be nickel-and-dimed over paying their workers a minimum wage, gun manufacturers, and the National Rifle Association of America. He also wrote:

The temptation among some folks is strong to swim against the tide and thumb one's nose at the establishment, and obviously I'll grant that no one is more establishment than Clinton. It's a vote that is chiefly against something – in this case, her pro-corporate sail-trimming and all the rest. But a protest vote is never solely a protest vote. You're also voting for something. And even if you rationalize that away by saying to yourself, "Ah, he's not gonna win, I'm just having my jollies," I'd urge you to bear in mind that jollies can have consequences, too.

Comedian John Oliver on his HBO show Last Week Tonight with John Oliver deemed Johnson's campaign as "prone to overly simple solutions that could have disastrous consequences", and concluded that "there is no perfect candidate in this race".

Given the circumstances, the Clinton campaign and Democratic allies stated they were taking the threat from Johnson seriously, making direct appeals to young voters and punching down at the third-party candidates they view as potential spoilers.

=== After the election ===
The 2016 election results prompted analysts to focus on four states in which Trump's lead over Clinton was less than Johnson's total number of votes: Florida, Pennsylvania, Wisconsin, and Michigan; for instance, analysts also expressed if about half of Johnson's supporters would have voted for Clinton over Trump, the electoral map would have been decidedly different. There were close races in Michigan, where Trump won by fewer than 14,000 votes, Johnson got more than 172,000 votes; and in Wisconsin, where Johnson won more than 105,000 votes, Trump won by less than 33,000 votes.

Vanity Fair expressed in an article: "Millions of Americans, dissatisfied with both candidates and unwilling to choose between the lesser of two evils, registered their protest by voting for Gary Johnson or Jill Stein, helping hand a number of critical swing states, and the presidency, to Donald Trump."

Feminist website Jezebel claimed that the tune of a historic 4 million votes for Johnson helped ensure a Donald Trump presidency, and pointed Johnson had so weak probabilities to win that his own running mate Bill Weld appeared to have implicltly supported Clinton, and that he had to know he was never going to be president.

In Johnson's defense, Joe Hunter, communications director for the Johnson–Weld campaign, said "the attacks on Governor Johnson from the left were relentless as it became clear that many millennials and former [Bernie] Sanders voters were looking closely at our ticket" and "if those attacks weren't quite effective enough for the Clinton camp, it is certainly not our responsibility." As well, other Libertarian politicians claimed "they don't owe anybody any votes" and that Democrats spent way too little time in critical swing states.

== Results ==
Gary Johnson's county-by-county performance across the nation. Percentage shades are in increments of one.

Gary Johnson received 4,489,233 total votes and 3.3% of the national vote, coming third in the nation and setting a record for the Libertarian Party's strongest historical result to date. In terms of the Libertarian Party's electoral history, he bested Ed Clark's previous record-setting 1.1% of the total vote in the 1980 presidential election, as well as his own record-setting 1,275,923 votes in the 2012 presidential election. His share of the national vote was also the highest for a third-party candidate since Ross Perot's 8.4% showing in the 1996 presidential election. The highest percentage of votes received by Johnson was in New Mexico (where he was governor from 1995 to 2003), where he received 9.3%.

Johnson's supporters heavily skewed young, with 70% of them being under 50, and many of them Republican-leaning and holding a bachelor's degree or higher; however, he was deeply unpopular with very conservative voters. 13% of Johnson's backers were black or Latino, compared with just 6% for Trump.

== Endorsements ==
On August 6, U.S. Representative Scott Rigell, Republican of Virginia, announced his support for Johnson, marking the candidate's first endorsement by a member of Congress.

On September 2, the Cornell University College Republicans announced their support, led by chairwoman Olivia Corn. This was unprecedented for a College Republicans organization to do, and received significant media attention.

Johnson received the endorsement of the editorial boards of nine daily newspapers: the Chicago Tribune, the Detroit News, the New Hampshire Union Leader, the Winston-Salem Journal, and the Richmond Times-Dispatch. All five papers had traditionally endorsed Republican candidates, but endorsed Johnson over Trump, who received less newspaper endorsements. Democratic nominee Hillary Clinton, however, led in newspaper endorsements, surpassing the other candidates even among conservative-leaning papers.

== See also ==
- 2016 Libertarian National Convention
- Libertarian Party presidential debates and forums, 2016
- Libertarian Party presidential primaries, 2016
