= John Williams (radio personality) =

American talk radio host

- Born: John William Fillipitch; October 19, 1959 (age 66); Chicago, Illinois, US
- Presenting career
- Style: Interviewer
- Country: United States

John Williams (born October 19, 1959) is an American talk radio show host at WGN (AM) in Chicago and previously at WCCO (AM) in Minneapolis, Minnesota.

== Early life ==
Williams was born in Chicago, Illinois, as John William Fillipitch.

He attended grade school in different places while his father was in the U.S. Air Force, but the family moved back to Joliet, Illinois, after his father's retirement from the service.

Williams graduated from Minooka High School and later from Joliet Junior College, where his father was a school counselor. He eventually graduated from Southern Illinois University Carbondale as a broadcasting major.

== Radio career ==
Williams worked briefly at WSPY-FM in Plano, Illinois, then spent 10 years at WMBD (AM) in Peoria, Illinois. He also wrote a series of joke books, titled The Spieler Scale of Comedy. After four years at WCCO (AM) in Minneapolis, Williams was hired at WGN (AM) in Chicago in September 1997.

=== Timeline ===
- 1981 — WSPY-FM in Plano, Illinois
- 1981 to 1993 — WMBD (AM), Peoria, Illinois: morning show host and other positions
- 1993 to 1997 — WCCO (AM), Minneapolis, Minnesota: mid-day show host
- September 1997 to December 2008 — WGN 720, Chicago, Illinois: mid-day and afternoon show host
- December 2008 to 2010 — WGN 720, Chicago, Illinois: morning show host, broadcasting from 5 a.m. to 9 a.m.
- April 2010 — WCCO 1:00-3:00
- July 2010 WGN — 12:30-3:00
- July 2010 WCCO — 9:00-12:00
- December 2011 — WGN 12:00-3:00
- January 2011 — WCCO 3:00-6:00

=== Recognitions ===
- Winner, Personality of the Year: 2001 Illinois Broadcasters Association Silver Dome Awards
- Finalist, Personality of the Year: 2006 Illinois Broadcasters Association Silver Dome Awards
- Finalist, NAB Marconi Radio Awards
- Winner, Best Afternoon Show on a News, Talk, Personality or Sports Station: 2001 Chicago A.I.R. Awards
- Winner, Best Talent: 2001 Chicago A.I.R. Awards

== Life outside radio ==
Williams enjoys reading, running (including once around the block outside WGN in long underwear to fulfill a pledge), and playing basketball. He is married, has two sons, and his late dachshund named Fred, who he called "The World's Largest Wiener Dog".

== See also ==
- Steve Cochran (radio host)
