= Steve Cochran (radio host) =

American radio broadcaster (born 1961)

- Born: March 14, 1961 (age 65); Ithaca, New York, U.S.
- Years active: 1981–present
- Presenting career
- Show: The Steve Cochran Show
- Stations: WGN 720 AM, Chicago
- Time slot: 5:00 AM - 10:00 AM
- Website: www.stevecochranshow.com

Steve Cochran (born March 14, 1961) is an American radio broadcaster. He hosted the morning show at WGN in Chicago from 2013 to December 2019. He previously worked at WGN from 2000 to 2010. After leaving WGN in 2019, he started the podcast "Live from my Office," sponsored by Team Hochberg. He has been the morning host for WLS (AM) in Chicago since June 2022.

== Childhood ==
Cochran was adopted. On June 4, 2003, he had his birth mother, Ann Sommers, as a guest on his show.

== Career ==
At the age of 18, Cochran attended Ithaca College for a year before dropping out to start his radio career. He sold radio advertising for a summer before starting his career at WTKO in his home town as a DJ.

Between 1981 and 2007, Cochran worked at 14 radio stations in 10 cities (including New York, Baltimore, Miami, Minneapolis (KDWB 101.3 FM), St. Louis, Detroit, and Chicago) and 8 states.

In 1993, he had a cameo as a TV weather man in the film Grumpy Old Men.

Cochran returned to Chicago airways on October 3, 2011, via AM 560 WIND. His show ended on June 29, 2013. He also hosted the midday show at KTRS in St. Louis from 2010 to 2013.

On September 3, 2013, Cochran began hosting the morning show at WGN 720.

On June 15, 2022, Cochran returned to the airwaves on WLS (AM) 890, filling the spot that had been open since Bruce St. James was dismissed from the station in April 2022. However, as June 2024, he is no longer with WLS.

== WGN ==
Cochran was originally hired by WGN in early 2000 as a substitute host in various rotating shifts. He became a regular host unexpectedly after morning drive time host, Bob Collins, was killed in a collision while piloting his private airplane. To replace Collins, Spike O'Dell moved from afternoon drive to morning drive, John Williams moved from mid-afternoon to afternoon drive and Cochran filled the mid-afternoon time slot. The Williams and Cochran shows swapped time slots in 2007.

He broadcast The Steve Cochran Show on weekday afternoons. He described his show as being "a combination of funny and serious elements with special attention paid to charitable causes and kid issues."

WGN management decided not to renew Cochran's contract in mid-2010. His final day on the air was June 25, 2010. He returned to the station in July 2013. Steve was let go from WGN radio on December 20, 2019.

== Life outside radio ==
Outside of radio, Cochran also does stand-up comedy and has done comedy shows on New Year's Eve. He is married to Maureen and has a son, Ross and a daughter, Amy. Cochran lives in Naperville, Illinois.
