= Jay Cost =

American journalist

- Education: University of Virginia (BA); University of Chicago (MA, PhD)
- Occupations: Political pundit, blogger
- Employer(s): The Weekly Standard, National Review
- Political party: Republican (before 2016); Independent (2016–present)
- Website: The Weekly Standard

Jay Cost is an American conservative political historian, journalist, and elections analyst, who writes for The Weekly Standard and National Review. Cost previously wrote "HorseRaceBlog" at RealClearPolitics. Cost has written widely on the Founding and civic virtues, political parties, and the influence of big business in American politics, and is the author of the upcoming The Price of Greatness: Alexander Hamilton, James Madison, and the Creation of American Oligarchy as well as the earlier A Republic No More and Spoiled Rotten.

== Personal life and education ==
Cost received a B.A. in Government from the University of Virginia, as well as an M.A. and Ph.D in political science from the University of Chicago. Cost served in the past as a part-time professor at Robert Morris University and Grove City College.

== Career ==
In 2005, while working on his dissertation at the University of Chicago, Cost joined the staff of RealClearPolitics. Cost became a writer for The Weekly Standard in 2010. Although his education background is in political science, Cost claims that he has come to rely more on his reading of the history of American elections than on political science and public opinion polling. In 2012 Cost released a book, Spoiled Rotten: How the Politics of Patronage Corrupted the Once Noble Democratic Party and Now Threatens the American Republic, in which Cost argued that the Democratic Party has been taken over by interest groups. Barack Obama ultimately won the election, and PPP's Tom Jensen and New York's Jonathan Chait criticized Cost's skepticism of the polls. He left the Republican Party in 2016 when the party refused to prevent Donald Trump from obtaining the nomination at the convention.
