= Ken Rutkowski =

American journalist

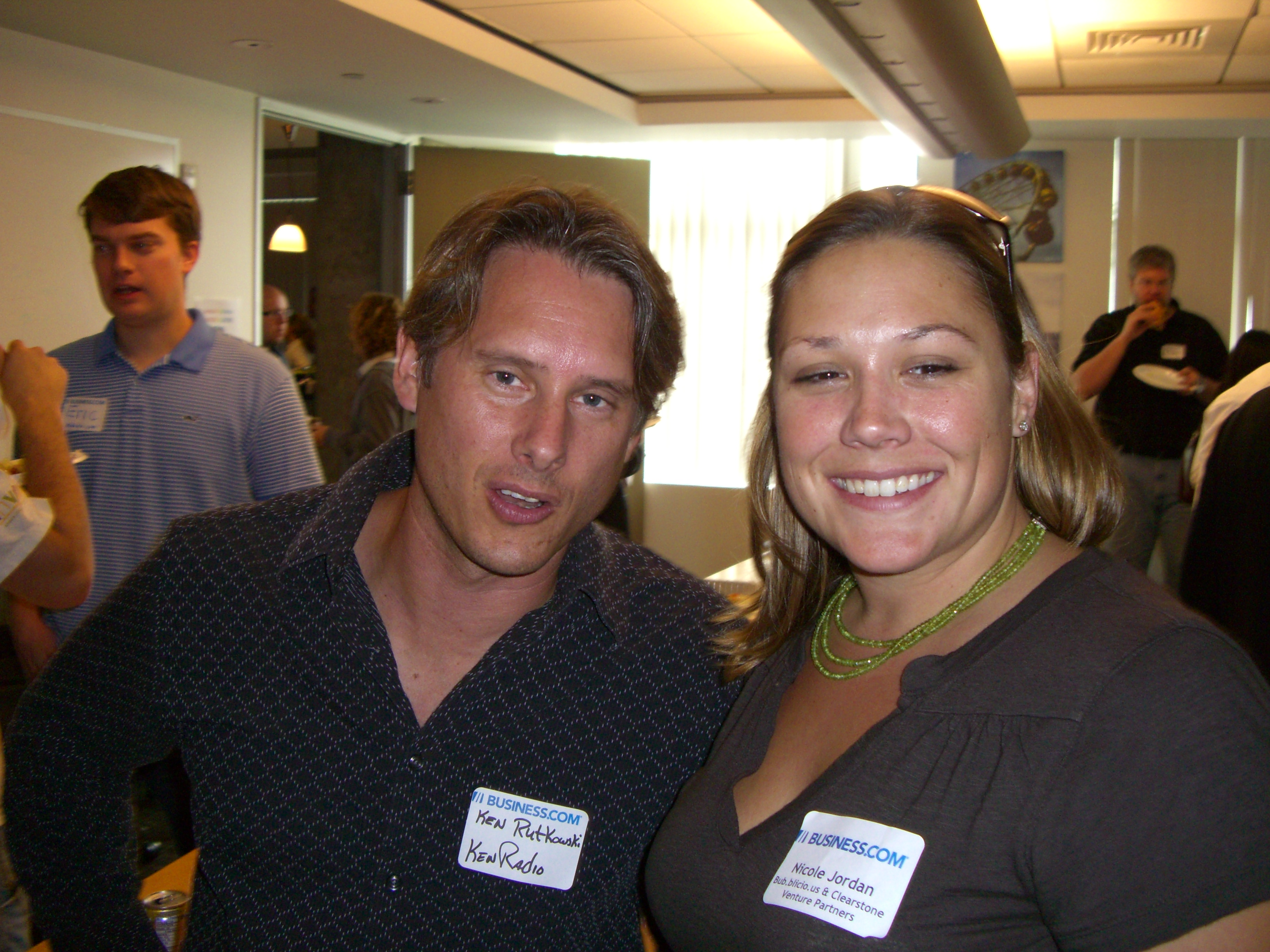
- Rutkowski (left) in 2007
- Born: May 5, 1966 (age 60)
- Occupations: Inspirational and Nexist speaker, radio broadcaster
- Political party: Cyber Party (2015)
- Awards: Digital Entertainment Award 2005

Ken Rutkowski (born May 5, 1966) is founder, president and host of KenRadio Broadcasting which is syndicated on CBS Radio, He is also the founder of the media, entertainment and technology alliance known as METal. Rutkowski is the Local Partner of Founder Institute Chapter Los Angeles.

== Career ==
Rutkowski is the former host of Business Rockstars, a two-hour weekday afternoon program. The program features discussions with CEOs and entrepreneurs about financing, marketing and networking.

Rutkowski is a founding member of the Streaming Media Executive Committee and on the boards of several media, entertainment, and technology companies. He appears regularly as a guest correspondent for KTTV-TV Fox 11 and Fox's Good Day LA. Rutkowski has created and hosted various technology programs on NPR, ABC, WLS Chicago, KHOW Denver, CNET Radio San Francisco, and BBC Professional associations. Rutkowski is also on the board of several media, entertainment and technology companies.

In March 1990, Rutkowski established KenRadio Broadcasting, a daily technology podcast focused on the high tech industry. Since 1995, Rutkowski's daily talk show, "The World Technology Roundup," has also focused on high tech business worldwide.

In January 2003, Rutkowski founded Media Entertainment Technology Alpha Leaders (METal). The group aims to provide members with a variety of opportunities, intellectual interests, and support mechanisms built on shared values across the media, entertainment, and technology spaces.

In 2005, Rutkowski received a Digital Entertainment Award for his activity in new media and emerging technologies.

In 2006, he moderated panels at the Milken Institute Global Conference in 2006. He returned for another Global Conference in 2015 as a speaker. He informed listeners about electronic currencies and where they were headed in the future. In 2007, Rutkowski was one of the runners of Seoul Digital Forum.

Since July 2009, Rutkowski has been a board member at Opportunity Green, an event that addresses innovation opportunities for industry leaders and thought leaders in pursuing sustainable business solutions.

In October 2009, Rutkowski was named an intelligence analyst at the Oprah Winfrey Network, where he created research analysis focused on identifying and providing updates on people, companies, events, technologies, trends, and conferences relevant to the Oprah Winfrey Network. He concluded this occupation in 2012 when the network lost three hundred thirty million dollars and could no longer afford a surplus of workers.

In January 2010, Rutkowski became a partner and analyst in innovation and social media at Free Form, a media company that translates "potent thinking into stories that move people." Rutkowski has been a guest lecturer at various universities, including Loyola University, Northwestern University, and the University of Illinois at Urbana-Champaign. He has been a guest speaker at Massachusetts Institute of Technology, University of Southern California, University of California, Los Angeles, University of California, San Diego, and University of California, Berkeley, among other universities.

In January 2010, Rutkowski became a Los Angeles local partner at the Founder Institute, a training program for entrepreneurs that prepares founders to lead technology companies in industries from biotechnology to the Internet.

At about the same time, Rutkowski became a board member of TEDx San Francisco, an independently organized Technology, Entertainment, and Design event.

Rutkowski has been profiled in The Wall Street Journal, Fox News, BBC, BusinessWeek, Wired, Internet World, Electronic Media, Online Journalism Review, Boston Times, Chicago Tribune, Chicago Sun-Times, Finland Helsingin Sanomat, Asahi Shimbun, Bangkok Times, among other publications worldwide.

His honors include nomination for the fifth UCLA's Wireless Conference.

== 2016 Cyber Party vice-presidential candidacy ==
Rutkowski was briefly the vice-presidential nominee of the now-defunct Cyber Party in the 2016 U.S. presidential election, running alongside software entrepreneur John McAfee. McAfee chose in December 2015 to instead switch to seeking the Libertarian nomination, but Rutkowski did not join him in seeking the Libertarian vice-presidential nomination. McAfee later selected photographer Judd Weiss as his Libertarian running mate, but neither were nominated at the 2016 Libertarian National Convention.
