= KZJK =

Adult hits radio station in the Twin Cities region of Minnesota

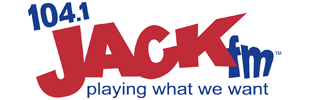
- St. Louis Park, Minnesota; United States
- Broadcast area: Minneapolis-St. Paul
- Frequency: 104.1 MHz (HD Radio)
- RDS: PI: 52F8; PS: ARTIST TITLE JACK FM; RT: Artist - Title
- Branding: 104.1 Jack FM

Programming
- Format: Adult hits
- Affiliations: Jack FM

Ownership
- Owner: Audacy, Inc.; (Audacy License, LLC)
- Sister stations: KMNB; WCCO

History
- First air date: July 1, 1962
- Former call signs: KRSI-FM (1962–1973); KFMX (1973–1980); KRSI-FM (1980–1981); KJJO (1981–1995); KMJZ (1995–1998); WXPT (1998–2005)
- Call sign meaning: "Jack"

Technical information
- Licensing authority: FCC
- Facility ID: 54425
- Class: C0
- ERP: 100,000 watts
- HAAT: 315 meters (1,033 ft)
- Transmitter coordinates: 45.058°N 93.124°W

Links
- Public license information: Public file; LMS
- Webcast: Listen live (via Audacy)
- Website: www.audacy.com/1041jackfm

KZJK (104.1 FM) is a commercial radio station licensed to St. Louis Park, Minnesota, and serving the Minneapolis-St. Paul radio market. The station is owned by Audacy, Inc., and airs an adult hits radio format known as "104.1 Jack FM". KZJK's studios and offices are on Second Avenue South in Minneapolis.

KZJK has an effective radiated power (ERP) of 100,000 watts. The station's transmitter is on the KMSP Tower in Shoreview, with a auxiliary transmitter with an effective radiated power (ERP) of 34,000 watts located at the IDS Center in Downtown Minneapolis. KZJK broadcasts using HD Radio technology.

== History ==
=== Early years as KRSI-FM ===
The station first signed on as KRSI-FM on July 1, 1962. It was co-owned with KRSI (950 AM) by Radio Suburbia. The two stations simulcast most of their programming, and were affiliates of the ABC Radio Network. KRSI was a daytimer at that time, so KRSI-FM allowed the station to be heard around the clock, even when the AM had to sign-off.

KRSI-FM had a limited range, broadcasting at 15,000 watts from a 250-foot (76 m) tower, located in Eden Prairie, Minnesota on one of the AM station's three towers. The result was a spotty signal in parts of the metropolitan area, even after the power was doubled to 30,000 watts in the late 1960s, and then to a 100,000 watt transmitter in Somerset, Wisconsin, in the 1980s. Partly due to signal limitations and impatient management, the 104.1 FM frequency went through many format changes throughout its history.

In February 1968, KRSI-AM-FM was bought by Park Communications, a radio company with stations in New York City, Los Angeles and other cities. From 1968 until 1973, KRSI-AM-FM played a mix of Top 40 hits and oldies as "Request Radio". In Spring 1969, KRSI-AM-FM ranked as the #3 station in the Minneapolis ratings, behind WCCO and WDGY. By 1971, KRSI-AM-FM moved away from oldies and toward contemporary hits.

=== Rock/top 40 KFMX ===
In March 1973, KRSI became the first affiliate of Drake-Chenault’s automated “Great American Country” format. Both stations moved from their studios in St. Louis Park to new facilities in Eden Prairie (which today is still home to 950 AM). The FM station broadcast in stereo for the first time and moved to an album rock/Top 40 hybrid format, soon changing its call letters to KFMX.

KFMX went through a succession of different formats and transitions throughout the rest of the decade. For a brief time, it played free form rock, going up against KQRS-FM. KFMX began playing disco music at night in 1978, soon adopting the format full-time and becoming "Disco 104." By this time, the AM station was playing rock/Top 40 and new wave music as "Musicradio I-95." KFMX gave up disco in February 1980 as the fad faded in popularity, and both stations switched to an adult standards/"Music of Your Life" simulcast, with KFMX becoming KRSI-FM once again.

=== KJJO ===
In September 1981, the FM station switched to country music, as "K-JO Country", adopting the KJJO call letters. It was up against established country stations in the Twin Cities, market leader WDGY, low-rated KTCR-AM-FM and soon, KEEY. KJJO was never very competitive as a country station.

On September 15, 1983, after playing "Old Time Rock and Roll" by Bob Seger for 48 hours straight, the station launched a new classic hits format, "Twenty Years of Rock and Roll", as "K-JO 104".

KJJO's ratings improved with the classic hits format, but the station was still not making much of an impact in the market. In February 1987, KJJO transformed yet again and introduced a hard rock format, to go head-to-head with the classic rock-leaning KQRS-FM. The KJJO call letters were retained, with the station now calling itself "Hot Rockin' 104" (later "Rock 104"). At its peak, the hard rock format pushed KJJO into the top 10 in the local Arbitron ratings. KJJO was not very consistent with the harder format, though, as it went back and forth between heavy metal and mainstream album rock. In the fall of 1988, KJJO's AM counterpart became a network affiliate of the syndicated heavy metal "Z-Rock" format.

=== Modern rock KJ104 ===
By 1990, KJJO began adding more alternative rock songs to its play list. In March of that year, KJJO ditched the heavy metal and mainstream rock altogether and became a full-fledged modern rock station. At first, KJJO called itself "104FM", but later used the moniker "KJ104".

During the station's modern rock run, the playlist became more adventurous. Over time, KJ104 garnered positive word of mouth in the Twin Cities area, though ratings were still mediocre. The station's manager complained in the local media that KJ104's listeners were not filling out the Arbitron ratings diaries, the results of which are used to measure a radio station's success.

=== Back to country as "Thunder 104" ===
In the summer of 1992, KJJO announced it would switch back to country music, which was increasing in popularity, amid a large outcry from KJ104's dedicated modern rock fans. At 6 a.m. on September 8, after signing off the modern rock format by playing "It's the End of the World as We Know It (And I Feel Fine)" by R.E.M., "Thunder 104" debuted. As a country station, ratings went up slightly, but the station could not compete with the established country leader KEEY ("K102"), or WBOB ("BOB 100").

To set itself apart from the competition, KJJO evolved into a classic country format as "Classic Country 104” in March 1994, and ratings slightly improved. Also that same month, several former KJ104 employees were working at bringing the rock format back to the local airwaves, which culminated with the debut of REV 105. Two months prior to this, hard rocker KRXX became KEGE "The Edge", and was soon the highest-rated modern rock station in the country, succeeding where KJJO, as KJ104, failed.

=== Smooth jazz and modern AC ===
With K102 and BOB 100 firmly establishing in the country format, KJJO gave up on country and flipped to smooth jazz on April 3, 1995, under new call letters KMJZ. During this time, ownership transferred several times; Nationwide Communications, a subsidiary of Nationwide Insurance, bought both the AM and FM stations from the estate of longtime owner Roy H. Park. Nationwide Communications was bought by Jacor in October 1997; Jacor would spin the station off to Infinity Broadcasting in June 1998. As Infinity had recently merged with CBS, this brought the station under common ownership with WCCO Television and Radio.

On September 24, 1998, at 4 p.m., the station changed format once again, to modern AC as WXPT, "104-1 The Point". The first song on "The Point" was "The Way" by Fastball. After gradually adding in songs from the 1980s throughout the course of 2000, WXPT shifted to a full-fledged 1980s hits format on November 17, 2000, and rebranded as "Mix 104.1". The first song on "Mix" was "Beat It" by Michael Jackson. While never a dominant station, "Mix" was a modest ratings and financial success, as the station's transmitter woes were finally resolved by the move to KMSP-TV's antenna array in Shoreview, Minnesota, where most of the market's big FM stations have their transmitters.

CBS Radio later sold WXPT's longtime sister station at 950 AM to a local group, which turned it into KTNF, a progressive talk station.

=== Jack FM ===
At 9 a.m. on April 21, 2005, after a few hours of stunting, "Mix 104.1" flipped to "Jack FM". The first song on "Jack" was "Get The Party Started" by P!nk. On May 10, 2005, three weeks after the format change, the call letters were officially changed to KZJK.

KZJK has a larger playlist compared to other radio stations. While many stations commonly have 200-400 songs in rotation, the Jack format has three or four times that number.

On February 2, 2017, CBS Radio announced it would merge with Entercom. The merger was approved on November 9, 2017, and was consummated on November 17.

== KZJK-HD2 ==
KZJK broadcasts an HD Radio signal. Its HD2 signal originally carried a smooth jazz format, but on December 26, 2011, fellow sister station WLTE's former "Lite FM" adult contemporary format moved to KZJK-HD2 after WLTE flipped to country music as KMNB. As of March 2023, KZJK no longer broadcasts an HD2 signal.
