= W227BF =

Relays KQQL-HD2, Anoka
- Shoreview, Minnesota; United States
- Broadcast area: Minneapolis-St. Paul metropolitan area
- Frequency: 93.3 MHz
- Branding: Twin Cities' BIN 93.3

Programming
- Language: English
- Format: Black-oriented news
- Affiliations: Black Information Network

Ownership
- Owner: iHeartMedia; (iHM Licenses, LLC)
- Sister stations: K244FE; K273BH; KDWB-FM; KEEY-FM; KFXN-FM; KQQL; KTCZ-FM; KTLK

History
- First air date: June 13, 2014
- Call sign meaning: (serially assigned)

Technical information
- Licensing authority: FCC
- Facility ID: 140133
- Class: D
- ERP: 99 watts
- HAAT: 229 m (751 ft)
- Transmitter coordinates: 44°58′34.0″N 93°16′21.0″W

Links
- Public license information: Public file; LMS
- Webcast: Listen Live
- Website: https://twincities.binnews.com

W227BF (93.3 FM) is a translator broadcasting Black Information Network programming from the HD2 subcarrier of iHeartMedia's KQQL. Licensed to Shoreview, Minnesota, it serves the Minneapolis-St. Paul metropolitan area inside the I-494/I-694 beltway. The station is owned by iHeartMedia. All the offices and studios are located in St. Louis Park and the transmitter is atop the IDS Center in downtown Minneapolis.

== History ==
On April 25, 2006, Clear Channel announced that KQQL's HD2 subchannel will carry a format focusing on hit music from the 1980s. The HD2 station, called Kool 1-0-80s, showcased every song to ever hit the Top 40 in the 1980s.

During summer 2011, the HD2 subchannel changed programming to a simulcast of AM radio station KFXN ('The Score'). On September 8, 2011, the "Score" sports format began airing exclusively on KQQL-HD2 as their former signal (690 AM) was flipped to Asian programming.

In August 2012, the HD2 subchannel was changed back to Kool 1-0-80s, now iHeartRadio's "My 80s", with the same 1980s hits format it had before.

On May 23, 2014, KQQL-HD2 changed their format to urban adult contemporary and began simulcasting on FM translator W227BF (93.3 FM), licensed to Shoreview. Soon after, it started stunting with several types of music, changing every few days.

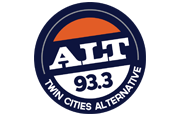
Logo as "Alt 93.3"

On June 13, 2014, KQQL-HD2 changed their format to modern rock, branded as "ALT 93.3". The format competed against locally owned KQGO "GO 96.3" as well as Minnesota Public Radio's non-commercial adult album alternative KCMP "89.3 The Current."

KQQL's Kool 1-0-80s format eventually moved to KQQL's HD3 channel, in addition to translator W244CS (96.7) in the Southeast metro. On June 12, 2015 KQQL-HD3 and W244CS changed their format to an LGBT-oriented dance format, branded as "96.7 Pride Radio."

On April 18, 2018, the St. Paul Saints announced that “ALT” would be their new radio home for the 2018 season.

Effective May 30, 2019, Educational Media Foundation sold W227BF and five other translators to iHeartMedia, which already supplied programming to the translators, in exchange for WEKL, WSFF, WSNZ, and WLRX.

On June 29, 2020, fifteen iHeart stations in markets with large African American populations, including W227BF/KQQL-HD2, began stunting with African American speeches, interspersed with messages such as "Our Voices Will Be Heard" and "Our side of the story is about to be told," with a new format slated to launch on June 30. That day, W227BF/KQQL-HD2, along with the other fourteen stations, became the launch stations for the Black Information Network, an African American-oriented all-news network.
