= KTLK (disambiguation) =

KTLK may refer to:

- KTLK (AM), a radio station (1130 AM) licensed to serve Minneapolis, Minnesota, United States
- KTLK-FM, a radio station (104.9 FM) licensed to serve Columbia, Illinois, United States
- KEIB, a radio station (1150 AM) located in Los Angeles, California, United States, which held the call sign KTLK from 2005 to 2014
- KFXN-FM, a radio station (100.3 FM) located in Minneapolis, Minnesota, United States, which held the call sign KTLK-FM from 2006 to 2011
