= Ringtone Countdown =

The Ringtone Countdown
- Genre: Music chart show, talk
- Running time: Approx. 1 hour (including commercials)
- Country of origin: (United States) USA
- Home station: KDWB-FM Minneapolis-St. Paul
- Starring: Dave Ryan, Lena Svenson, & Steve LaTart, and various guest hosts
- Original release: January, 2008 – December, 2009
- Website: www.ringtonecountdown.com

The Ringtone Countdown was a nationally-syndicated radio countdown show that counted down the top 10 biggest ringtones in the United States. Originating from Minneapolis-St. Paul, it was hosted by KDWB-FM Morning Show host Dave Ryan.

The Ringtone Countdown started in January 2008 and ended in December 2009. It was heard on Top 40/CHR stations nationwide. The show was produced and distributed by Nine-Ball Radio in the United States.
