= Jason DeRusha =

Minnesota journalist and broadcaster

- Born: January 24, 1975 (age 51); Des Plaines, Illinois, U.S.
- Occupations: Radio host, journalist
- Employer: WCCO Radio
- Known for: WCCO-TV anchor, food critic, radio host
- Spouse: Alyssa DeRusha
- Children: 2

Jason DeRusha (born January 24, 1975) is an American journalist and radio host best known for his long tenure as a news anchor at WCCO-TV in Minneapolis–Saint Paul. He is currently the host of the afternoon drive program on WCCO (AM), and is recognized for his approachable style, versatility across formats, and extensive coverage of Minnesota news and culture.

== Early life and education ==
DeRusha was born in Des Plaines, Illinois, and grew up in suburban Chicago. He attended Marquette University in Milwaukee, Wisconsin, where he earned a bachelor's degree in political science and broadcast journalism. During college, he gained early media experience through internships and student-run media outlets.

== Career ==
DeRusha began his professional journalism career as a reporter at stations in Milwaukee and Davenport, Iowa, before joining WCCO-TV in 2003. He gained local prominence through his role as a morning anchor and as the station's food critic, where his segments combined lifestyle reporting with a deep appreciation for the Twin Cities culinary scene.

In May 2022, DeRusha announced he would be leaving the WCCO morning anchor desk after nearly two decades, stating that it was time for a "new adventure." He officially signed off from WCCO-TV on June 23, 2022.

Shortly thereafter, it was announced that DeRusha would transition to radio, hosting the afternoon drive program on WCCO (AM). His show debuted on June 27, 2022, blending news, interviews, listener calls, and commentary on local issues.

== Awards and recognition ==
Throughout his career, DeRusha has received multiple Emmy Awards for his reporting and anchoring. He has also been recognized by the Minnesota Broadcasters Association and was named one of "Minnesota's Most Influential Media Personalities" by local publications.

In 2015, DeRusha was named a finalist for a James Beard Foundation Award in the "Television Segment" category for his work as a food reporter on WCCO-TV.

His food reporting helped elevate local culinary journalism and earned accolades from both industry professionals and viewers.

== Personal life ==
Jason DeRusha lives in Maple Grove, Minnesota, with his wife, Alyssa, and their two sons. He is active in community events and charitable initiatives and is known for his passion for food, often sharing dining recommendations and culinary insights on social media.
