= KDWB-FM =

Contemporary hit radio station in Richfield-Minneapolis-St. Paul, Minnesota

- Richfield, Minnesota; United States
- Broadcast area: Minneapolis-Saint Paul
- Frequency: 101.3 MHz (HD Radio)
- RDS: PI: 1A29; PS/RT: 101.3 KDWB Title Artist
- Branding: 101.3 KDWB

Programming
- Format: Contemporary hit radio
- Subchannels: HD2: "Pride Radio"; Top 40–EDM; HD3: "State Fair Radio"; Variety hits
- Affiliations: Premiere Networks

Ownership
- Owner: iHeartMedia; (iHM Licenses, LLC)
- Sister stations: K244FE; K273BH; KEEY-FM; KFXN-FM; KQQL; KTCZ-FM; KTLK; W227BF

History
- First air date: August 1959
- Former call signs: WPBC-FM (1959–1972); WRAH (1972–1974); WYOO-FM (1974–1976)
- Call sign meaning: disambiguation of former Los Angeles sister station KFWB

Technical information
- Licensing authority: FCC
- Facility ID: 41967
- Class: C0
- ERP: 100,000 watts
- HAAT: 315 meters (1,033 ft)
- Transmitter coordinates: 45°3′29.9″N 93°7′27.8″W

Links
- Public license information: Public file; LMS
- Webcast: Listen live (via iHeartRadio); Listen live (via iHeartRadio) (HD3)
- Website: kdwb.iheart.com

KDWB-FM (101.3 MHz) is a commercial radio station broadcasting in the Twin Cities region of Minnesota, licensed to suburban Richfield. The station is owned by iHeartMedia, and airs a contemporary hit radio format.

KDWB has an effective radiated power (ERP) of 100,000 watts. KDWB's transmitter broadcasts from the KMSP Tower in Shoreview.

KDWB has an auxiliary transmitter with an effective radiated power (ERP) of 32,540 watts located at the IDS Center in Downtown Minneapolis. Studios are located in St. Louis Park.

== History ==
Between its AM and FM frequencies, KDWB has been an uninterrupted Top 40 outlet since 1959, originally at 630 kHz. KDWB gained an FM sister in 1976, when then-owner Doubleday Broadcasting purchased the 101.3 MHz frequency, later transferring the format there as FM stations attracted listeners from AM.

=== 63 KDWB ===
KDWB's origins date back to 1951 on the AM dial at 1590 kHz. The station was launched in August 1951, licensed to South St. Paul by the Tedesco brothers, Al, Vic and Nick, as WCOW. On the air between dawn and dusk, the station played country western and old-time music and signed on each day with a cowbell. The offices and studios were located at 208 Third Avenue N., and the transmitter was located at 158 White Bear Avenue in North St. Paul. WCOW was not successful, so the station transitioned to a female-oriented format, with the call letters changing to WISK in May 1956, and switched its frequency to 630 kHz the next year.

Once more, the format proved unpopular, and the station was sold the following year to the Crowell-Collier Broadcasting Company, owners of KFWB in Los Angeles and KEWB in San Francisco. The top 40 format of those stations, with strong California/West Coast style influence, was brought to Minnesota, and the call letters changed to KDWB in September 1959. "Channel 63, KDWB" then began its long uninterrupted run as a pop music station, and quickly became a major competitor to the established WDGY, which had been playing a pop music format for three years by that point. KDWB and WDGY were fierce rivals throughout the 1960s and 1970s; during that time, both stations gained more competition, as "Request Radio" AM 950 and FM 104.1 KRSI (1968), KSTP (1972), and WYOO (1974) picked up the format.

As KDWB, the station became the first radio station to be fined by the Federal Communications Commission. In March 1961, six months after a review of the Communications Act of 1934 granted it such power, the agency assessed a $10,000 penalty to the station for repeated willful violations of nighttime broadcast power restrictions on the AM band.

During the 1960s and 1970s, Program Director Chuck Blore referred to the seven air shifts in 24 hours as "The 7 Swinging Gentlemen". They included "True" Don Bleu, Bob Shannon, and Lou Reigert (Lou Waters). Other notable On Air Staff included:Ron Block, Charles Brown, Barry McKenna, Jonny Matthews, Adam North, Chris Roberts, Jackson Ross, Rob Sherwood, Earl Trout.Then-owner Midcontinent Media sold the studio and tower site, which by then had been at Radio Drive and Interstate 94 for many years, for development. The regional headquarters of State Farm Insurance was built in its place.

=== History of 101.3 FM ===
101.3 FM began broadcasting on July 18, 1960, as WPBC-FM, simulcasting daytime-only WPBC (980 AM) and broadcasting at night.

Four years later, owners Bill and Becky Ann Stewart received approval to move both stations from Minneapolis to Richfield, including an increase of the AM's power to 5 kW. In 1969, the stations separated their programming, with the FM retaining the "good music" format, and the AM adopting a middle-of-the-road ("MOR") format. The studios, transmitters (both AM and FM), towers and offices were located at the intersection of Cliff Road and Cedar Avenue (presently "Nichols Road"), in Eagan.

The Stewarts sold WPBC-AM-FM in 1972, citing increased competition from larger companies, to Fairchild Industries for $1.5 million. Fairchild subsequently dismissed the staff and overhauled both stations. On November 3, 1972, WPBC-AM became WYOO, airing an oldies format, while WPBC-FM went off the air for technical adjustments, to emerge as album-oriented rock station WRAH on January 23, 1973.After making its debut to middling ratings that continually declined, WYOO pivoted in April 1974, spearheaded by new general manager Mike Sigelman, the former sales manager of KDWB. A shift to adult contemporary was met with even lower ratings; with management seeing a gap for an FM Top 40 station, both stations flipped on August 26, 1974, while broadcasting from the Minnesota State Fair. The market's fourth Top 40 at the time, originally intended to be named "Y100" until WHYI Miami sent a cease and desist letter, quickly became a competitive station in the market under the name "U100".

"U100" enjoyed a colorful but short life. The AM dial in the Twin Cities was packed with Top 40 stations, with U100, KDWB, WDGY and KSTP all fighting for the same audience. AM music stations also desired to transition to the increasingly popular FM dial. In early 1976, Fairchild Industries placed both stations on the market. Doubleday Broadcasting was not actively seeking an FM station at the time, but offered to buy WYOO-FM in February 1976 after it was presented with a generous deal that included the FM station and the building in Eagan that housed both stations for $850,000. KDWB's general manager at the time, Gary Stevens, said that it did not buy WYOO-FM to shut down a competitor, but rather to take advantage of what it saw as a good deal. The AM station was then sold to WAYL for $625,000.

"U100" ended at midnight on September 16, 1976, and under KDWB PD John Sebastian, KDWB morning personality Dave Thomson launched the KDWB AM/FM simulcast the following morning at 6:00 with "Bad Blood" by Neil Sedaka as the first song played following a pre-recorded announcement introducing the change from "U100". Full-time AM/FM simulcasts on stations licensed to large cities (cities with populations over 100,000) had not been allowed by the FCC since 1965. However, KDWB's simulcast was permitted via a conditional waiver and a technicality: while the AM was licensed to St. Paul (a community of over 100,000), the FM's city of license, Richfield, had a substantially smaller population. The FCC deemed the request to be in the public interest; however, KDWB was required by the FCC to broadcast eight hours of separate FM non-simulcast public affairs programming per week, with a portion focused on Richfield. The public affairs programs were broadcast from the former WYOO studio B news room and master control board in Eagan.

Boosted by the FM stereo simulcast and the removal of one of its competitors, KDWB quickly regained its position as the dominant Top 40 station in the Twin Cities. After a brief stint with a CHR/album rock hybrid as "Y-11", WDGY switched to a country format on September 2, 1977. KSTP began to lean toward Adult Top 40 during the late 1970s and evolved into a talk station by the early 1980s (as its music focus shifted to FM sister, KS95). By the end of the decade, KDWB was the only Top 40 station in the Twin Cities.

=== Stereo 101 ===
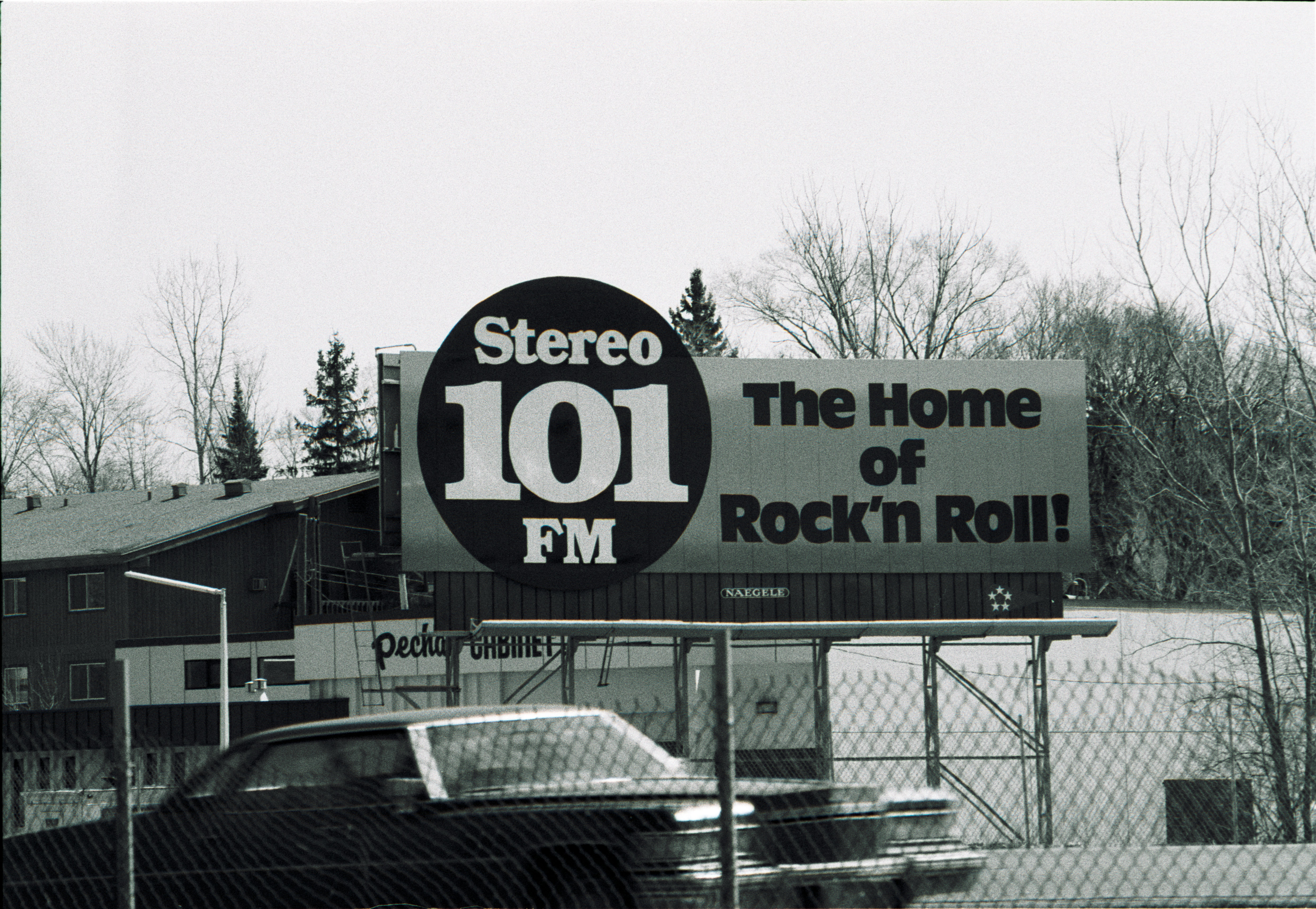
Stereo 101 FM billboard in 1982

With the active competition gone, KDWB-FM split apart from the AM station's Top 40 simulcast in September 1979, and became a pop/rock hybrid as "K101 FM", with a new separate air-staff. K101 FM was met with mixed reviews and less than hoped for ratings in the Fall 1979 Arbitron ratings. KDWB management opted for a change between the last week of December 1979 and New Year's 1980, by replacing the Program Director. The station immediately morphed into "Stereo 101, The Twin Cities Rockin' Best", then "KDWB Twin Cities' 101, The Home Of Rock 'N' Roll", and then "Real Rock 101 KDWB", an album rock station designed to go up against KQ92, which had recently dumped its freeform rock presentation and adopted a stricter playlist in reaction to a drop in ratings. Stereo 101 would be successful in its four-year run, topping KQRS in the Arbitron ratings many times, but KQRS would endure and prevail. By the summer 1983, KDWB-FM began to move from album rock to a pop/rock hybrid again, and eventually evolved into CHR the following year. KDWB's AM signal continued with the Top 40 format during this time, although it softened to adult contemporary in 1984.

=== Back to Top 40 ===
In December 1981, a serious new Top 40 competitor arrived in the Twin Cities, when WLOL dropped its soft rock format and turned itself into a high-profile hit music station (heavy with power pop and new wave), immediately shooting to the top of the ratings. At the other end of the spectrum, KS95 gravitated toward Adult Top 40. Around this time, WCCO-FM also briefly switched to Top 40. Meanwhile, 63 KDWB faded quickly in the ratings, as AM music stations were slowly becoming a thing of the past. To protect its heritage, take a chunk of WLOL's stellar ratings, and finally make the move of its legendary station to the FM dial, in early 1984, KDWB-FM reverted to the Top 40 simulcast as "The New KDWB FM 101", and then as "All Hit 101". Even though the AM station was running its own programming at times, in a role reversal, the FM signal was now deemed the priority, as 630 AM attained secondary status. The AM station aired a CHR format identical to its FM counterpart from fall 1984 to spring 1986, before it flipped to a separate satellite delivered Oldies format as "K63" in May 1986. In August 1991, 630 AM took on the WDGY call letters of their former Top 40 rival on 1130 AM.

KDWB-FM struggled for years against upstart market leader WLOL, which featured a fresher music selection, more popular DJs, and a highly rated morning show. KDWB was viewed by many as stuffy, stale, boring and misguided, and it went through several unsuccessful morning shows. It was argued by many that its promotions, music selection and on-air presentation paled in comparison to WLOL.

In 1988, newly hired program director Brian Phillips cleaned house, as he dismissed many of the on-air personalities, overhauled the music and brought in Steve Cochran to host The KDWB Morning Zoo. He also hired a new air staff, introduced 12-song commercial-free music sweeps, changed the overall on-air presentation, and created a new logo, which is still in use today. As the rechristened "101.3 KDWB", its fortunes changed, with KDWB quickly becoming the dominant Top 40/CHR station in the market. Now, WLOL was playing catch-up, as it tried various minor overhauls and tweaks before moving in a Rhythmic-oriented direction in 1990.

KDWB also gained national attention in 1989 for helping to break "The Look" by Roxette, the first of four U.S. number-one songs for the Swedish duo. In February 1991, WLOL came to a sudden and premature end, as owner Emmis Broadcasting experienced financial problems and began to divest of many of its properties. Minnesota Public Radio purchased WLOL and turned it into the flagship for their classical music service. Throughout the rest of the 1990s, KDWB had virtually no CHR competition.

== HD Radio ==
On April 25, 2006, Clear Channel Communications (now iHeartMedia), announced that KDWB's HD2 subchannel will carry a format focusing on dance hits. The HD2 signed the following July as the Party Zone. "Party Zone" is also the name of the Friday and Saturday night show on KDWB simulcasted from local clubs that in the past has been hosted by the likes of Tone E. Fly, Gerry Dixon and Michael Knight. After six months of running jockless, the subchannel began to add announcers (from KDWB) to its programming.

In 2010, the Party Zone format began broadcasting on K273BH, its FM translator at 102.5, which covers the area. They were one of two outlets in the Clear Channel roster that did not use the Club Phusion Dance format, as this one featured a live presentation over the air. The other one is KXJM Portland, Oregon, who launched "Too Wild HD2" in January 2012, customized for that market.

On April 29, 2013, the Party Zone format was dropped in favor of an Adult Contemporary format. In e-mails exchanged with the KDWB programming director, it was discovered that ultimately the station will air "songs recorded in Studio C from Cities 97", which began on July 15, 2013. K273BH was flipped to relay KTCZ-HD2.

In 2017, KDWB-HD2 changed to iHeart's "Trancid" format.

In May 2018, the station activated an HD3 sub-channel, and began airing an adult hits format as "Minnesota State Fair Radio".

After KQQL-HD3/K244FE dropped the "Pride Radio" format and flipped to sports talk as "KFAN Plus" in August 2018, the "Pride Radio" format moved to KDWB-HD2.

On November 16, 2018, KDWB-HD3 briefly switched to KQQL's classic hits format (while KQQL made its annual flip to Christmas music that same day). However, on November 30, KDWB-HD3 switched to a country format branded as "The Bull 101.3-HD3." Gregg Swedberg, program director and operations manager of sister KEEY, says that the "Bull" format "just plays country music, with no pop crossovers".

In May 2019, KDWB-HD3 reverted to its previous "Minnesota State Fair Radio" branding and Country/Adult Hits format.

== Dave Ryan in the Morning ==
The Dave Ryan in the Morning Show was KDWB's long-time morning show from June 4, 1993 until May 22, 2026. Ryan was joined by numerous co-hosts during the show's run including Lee Valsvik, Angi Taylor, Crisco, Corey Foley, Steve-O LaTart, Lena Svenson, Intern John, Falen Bonsett, Jenny Luttenberger, Bailey Hess, and Vont Leak.

== See also ==
- KKMS (AM)
- WDGY
- WYOO (U100)
