= KMNB =

- Minneapolis, Minnesota; United States
- Broadcast area: Minneapolis–Saint Paul
- Frequency: 102.9 MHz (HD Radio)
- RDS: PI: 3103; PS: ARTIST TITLE 102.9 THE WOLF; RT: Artist - Title
- Branding: 102.9 The Wolf

Programming
- Language: English
- Format: Country music
- Subchannels: HD2: Talk radio (WCCO)
- Affiliations: Minnesota Twins Radio Network

Ownership
- Owner: Audacy, Inc.; (Audacy License, LLC)
- Sister stations: KZJK; WCCO

History
- First air date: 1969
- Former call signs: WCCO-FM (1969–1983); WLTE (1983–2011)
- Call sign meaning: "Minnesota Buz'n" (former branding)

Technical information
- Licensing authority: FCC
- Facility ID: 9641
- Class: C0
- ERP: 100,000 watts
- HAAT: 315 meters (1,033 ft)
- Transmitter coordinates: 45°03′30″N 93°07′28″W

Links
- Public license information: Public file; LMS
- Webcast: Listen live (via Audacy)
- Website: www.audacy.com/1029thewolf

KMNB (102.9 MHz, "The Wolf") is a commercial FM radio station in Minneapolis–Saint Paul, that airs a country music radio format. It is owned by Audacy, Inc., with studios on Second Avenue South in Downtown Minneapolis. Along with sister station WCCO, it carries Minnesota Twins baseball games.

KMNB has an effective radiated power (ERP) of 100,000 watts, the maximum for most stations. Its main transmitter is on the KMSP Tower, off Ramby Avenue in Shoreview, Minnesota. KMNB broadcasts using HD Radio technology.

== History ==
=== WCCO-FM (1969–1983) ===
The station began as WCCO-FM in 1969. It was the FM counterpart of local powerhouse WCCO (830 AM), owned by Midwest Communications. As the station was hampered by its limited signal of only 2,700 watts, it had to temporarily transmit from the Foshay Tower at reduced power pending the completion of the Telefarm tower facility in Shoreview. It carried programming separate from the AM, with a mix of beautiful music and MOR album cuts along with soft vocals. The station later added two DJ shifts separate from the AM. They were hosted by Denny Long and Lou Lattson, playing free-form, progressive rock music, which included some underground rock tracks, along with full-service elements such as news and weather.

Until 1973, the station only operated for the minimum amount of time each day required to keep the license. In August 1973, when the transmitter was upgraded to full power at 100,000 watts, a broad-based popular adult music format was launched. By 1975, the format evolved to adult contemporary music, though WCCO-FM continued to play deeper album tracks than most AC stations. In that same year, WCCO-FM picked up the syndicated "Dr. Demento Show" for weekends. Personalities included Paul Stagg, Carl Lensgraf, Terri Davis, Tom Ambrose, Curt Lundgren, Johnny Canton, Peter May and Pat O'Neill. Tim Russell, who went on to be a cast member on NPR's "A Prairie Home Companion," hosted middays and created memorable characters like traffic reporter "Captain Buzz Studley."

=== Switch to Top 40 ===
WCCO-FM was a modestly successful station until new IDS Center transmitters for competing stations were built in 1979. That caused interference to WCCO-FM's broadcast signal. In addition to the interference, the station was affected by a labor strike at about the same time. The striking FM air staff was temporarily replaced with announcers with little experience, making the station sound unpolished compared to its usual presentation. The station also began to face formidable competition after a relaunch of KSTP-FM "KS95", with a comparable live AC format. WCCO-FM gravitated to a stricter playlist as the 1980s wore on.

In 1983, Top 40 became a very popular format across the country. WLOL, which picked up the format by 1982, was one of the most successful FM stations in the market, and KDWB, another popular Top 40 station, moved from AM to the FM band. WCCO-FM also made the switch to Top 40 under Program Director John Long that year. However, results were dismal, and both the format and Long lasted just a few months.

=== WLTE (1983–2011) ===
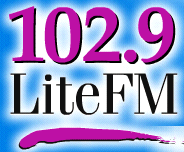
Logo as "102.9 Lite FM"

A "Lite" music format was introduced later in 1983, along with new call letters WLTE. In addition to the soft adult contemporary format, the station switched to all-Christmas music from mid-November to midnight on Christmas Day, billing itself in that period as "The Official Christmas Music Station". Rival Kool 108, an oldies station, also programs all Christmas music during this period.

In 1998, the ownership of WLTE, along with sister station WCCO, went to the Infinity Broadcasting Corporation, a subsidiary of CBS Radio.

Until the early 2000s, the station had been known as "W-Lite" and "Lite Rock 103 FM", having rounded the frequency up to "103" since the WCCO-FM days. The frequency approximation worked in the days before digital tuners, and it eliminated confusion with KEEY, on 102.1. The station became "102.9 Lite FM" in the mid-2000s, as digital tuners became standard on most FM radios, displaying a station's exact dial position.

=== Country music (2011–present) ===
Logo as "Buz'n"

In December 2011, WLTE became the subject of format change rumors, amid falling ratings. On December 16, 2011, the station dismissed its entire on-air staff, effective December 23, while also dropping the use of the "Lite FM" moniker. It began promoting "Something Fresh Coming to the Twin Cities." CBS announced on December 19 that the station would switch to a country music format, to be known as "Buz'n 102.9," effective December 26 at 8:00 a.m.. However, 102.9 switched to country at 6:00 p.m. on December 25, about 14 hours earlier than originally planned. The final song on "Lite FM" (and as WLTE) was "Grandma Got Run Over by a Reindeer" by Elmo & Patsy, while the first (and ultimately, last) song on "Buz'n" was "My Kinda Party" by Jason Aldean. At the same time as 102.9 gave up the format, the "Lite FM" AC music moved to co-owned KZJK 104.1-HD2, replacing smooth jazz.

On December 26, 2011, WLTE changed its call letters to KMNB to reflect the new Buz'n branding. WLTE was the last of four CBS Radio stations to drop the adult contemporary format in 2011 after March's flip of WIAD in Washington, D.C. from AC to hot adult contemporary (WWFS in New York City followed suit on October 12) and WCFS-FM in Chicago on August 1 of that year, when that station flipped to all-news to simulcast WBBM.

=== Entercom ownership ===
On February 2, 2017, CBS Radio announced it would merge with Entercom. The merger was approved on November 9, 2017, and was consummated on November 17. Entercom changed its name to Audacy in 2021.

On November 23, 2018, KMNB began running promos pointing to a change on December 3 at 7 a.m., under the tagline "the Buzz has worn off." At that time, KMNB rebranded as "102.9 The Wolf". It kept its country music format, but slightly tweaked it to include "yesterday's country hits" along with current and recent titles.

On March 3, 2020, Entercom and the Minnesota Twins baseball club announced that all games, in addition to being aired on flagship WCCO 830, would be simulcast on 102.9 KMNB for the 2020 baseball season. This arrangement would continue, at least through the 2024 season. In October 2024, the Twins and Audacy announced an extension of the pact which would keep the team's broadcasts on WCCO and KMNB for additional years.
