= K273BH =

Mainstream urban radio station in Fridley-Minneapolis–St. Paul, Minnesota

Coordinates: 44°58′33.9″N 93°16′20.8″W

Relays KFXN-HD4, Minneapolis
- Fridley, Minnesota; United States
- Broadcast area: Minneapolis-St. Paul
- Frequency: 102.5 MHz
- Branding: "Hot 102.5"

Programming
- Format: Mainstream urban
- Affiliations: Premiere Networks

Ownership
- Owner: iHeartMedia; (iHM Licenses, LLC)
- Sister stations: K244FE; KDWB-FM; KEEY-FM; KFXN-FM; KQQL; KTCZ-FM; KTLK; W227BF

History
- First air date: 2010
- Call sign meaning: (serially assigned)

Technical information
- Licensing authority: FCC
- Facility ID: 140150
- Class: D
- ERP: 250 watts
- HAAT: 235.9 m (774 ft)

Links
- Public license information: Public file; LMS
- Webcast: Listen Live
- Website: https://hot1025.iheart.com/

K273BH (102.5 FM, "Hot 102.5") is a translator broadcasting the mainstream urban format of the HD4 subcarrier of iHeartMedia's KFXN-FM. Licensed to Fridley, Minnesota, it serves the Minneapolis–Saint Paul metropolitan area inside the I-494/I-694 beltway. The station is currently owned by iHeartMedia, through licensee iHM Licenses, LLC. All the offices and studios are located in St. Louis Park and the transmitter is atop the IDS Center in downtown Minneapolis.

== History ==
In 2010, the translator signed on carrying KDWB-FM's HD2 sub-channel, which aired a dance music format known as "The Party Zone." In 2013, this would be dropped for a relay of the Air 1 network, which was carried on KTCZ-HD2 at the time. The relay would move to W225AP (92.9 FM) and K249ED (97.7 FM).

On June 5, 2015, at 3 p.m., after stunting for an hour with songs with the word "hot" in the name, KTCZ-HD3/K273BH launched with a classic hip hop format, branded as "Hot 102.5". The format would shift to urban on February 12, 2018, while retaining the "Hot" branding.

On August 7, 2019, iHeartMedia subsequently announced its intent to acquire the station outright, citing EMF's discomforts of allowing an urban contemporary format on stations the organization owns. This acquisition was part of a complex swap deal, which would see EMF buying K244FE. The deal was consummated on March 31, 2020.

Hot 102.5's primary competition was from Go 95.3, then KZGO. That station's format change occurred on January 5, 2016. KZGO was sold to EMF, and then back to its original owner, Christian Heritage Broadcasting, Inc. It's calls returned as KNOF.

Hot 102.5's competition is KMOJ, which is owned by the non-profit Center for Communication and Development, and has been on the air since 1976. KMOJ's transmitter is located in Arden Hills, allowing it larger coverage over the Twin Cities metro.
