= Pride Radio =

American LGBTQ+ top 40 radio network

PRIDE Radio
- Country: United States

Programming
- Format: Top 40–Rhythmic contemporary

Ownership
- Owner: iHeartMedia

History
- Launch date: 2006; 20 years ago

Coverage
- Availability: HD Radio and FM affiliates (see stations); iHeartRadio

Links
- Webcast: Listen live (via iHeartRadio)
- Website: prideradio.iheart.com

Pride Radio (United States) is an LGBTQ+ electronic dance music and top 40 radio network launched by Clear Channel Communications Format Lab under the direction of Michael Albl, who conceived the format, on terrestrial HD2 & HD3 stations and online via CCRD (Clear Channel Radio Digital) in 2006. The radio division became known as iHeartMedia on September 16, 2014. It is one of several music channels that are available through iHeartMedia's iHeartRadio app.

== Network information ==
The online portal acts as an interactive hub, hosting a variety of user-generated content. In addition, PRIDE Radio is a 24/7 streaming channel that plays upbeat Top 40 music (including remixes) and dance music targeted to the LGBTQ+ community. The service is also carried on the HD Radio sub-channels (HD2 & HD3) of selected iHeart radio stations around the U.S. The channel and accompanying online portal provide the LGBTQ+ audience with programming that aims to be entertaining, informative, and uniting. PRIDE Radio introduced a 24/7 slate of personalities in May 2013.

== Stations ==
Previous Pride Radio logo used until 2013.

These FM stations currently carry Pride Radio on their HD2 (or HD3) digital subchannels:

- WKSC-FM HD2 103.5 FM: Chicago, Illinois
- KIOI HD2 101.3 FM: San Francisco, California
- KHKS HD2 106.1 FM: Dallas, Texas (Previously an affiliate from 2006 to 2008; returned in March 2011.)
- KQBT HD2 93.7 FM: Houston, Texas
- WIHT HD2 99.5 FM: Washington, D.C.
- WBZY HD3 105.7 FM: Atlanta, Georgia
- WIOQ HD3 102.1 FM: Philadelphia, Pennsylvania (Previous affiliate that returned in March 2017.)
- WBWL HD2 101.7 FM: Boston, Massachusetts
- WBGG-FM HD3 105.9 FM: Miami, Florida
- KBKS-FM HD2 106.1 FM: Seattle, Washington
- KMXP HD2 96.9 FM: Phoenix, Arizona
- KDWB HD2 101.3 FM: Minneapolis, Minnesota
- KHTS-FM HD2 93.3 FM: San Diego, California
- WFLZ-FM HD2 93.3 FM Tampa, Florida (serves as PRIDE Radio's monitored reporter on Billboard's Dance/Mix Show Airplay chart)
- KBCO HD3 97.3 FM: Denver, Colorado
- WZFT HD2 104.3 FM: Baltimore, Maryland
- KXJM HD2 107.5 FM: Portland, Oregon
- WLKO HD2 102.9 FM: Charlotte, North Carolina
- KSLZ HD2 107.7 FM: St. Louis, Missouri
- WKST-FM HD2 96.1 FM: Pittsburgh, Pennsylvania
- WXXL HD2 106.7 FM: Orlando, Florida
- WKFS HD2 107.1: Cincinnati, Ohio
- KPEZ HD3 102.3 FM: Austin, Texas (serves as PRIDE Radio's monitored reporter on Mediabase's Dance Airplay Chart)
- WHLK HD2 106.5 FM: Cleveland, Ohio
- WXZX HD2 105.7 FM: Columbus, Ohio
- WKSC-FM HD2 103.5 FM: Chicago, Illinois
- WKSS HD2 95.7 FM: Hartford, Connecticut
- WTUE HD3 104.7 FM: Dayton, Ohio
- WPRM-FM HD4 99.1 FM: San Juan, Puerto Rico

== Former affiliates ==
- WSRS HD2: Worcester, Massachusetts (Switched to an 1980s pop format, probably originating from the iHeart80s feed, without any branding or slogan present)
- KDMX HD2: Dallas, Texas (Switched to oldies/gold AC format known as "Sunny 102.9 HD2" in early spring of 2011, now silent)
- KHFI HD2: Austin, Texas (Switched to "Hot Spot" programming)
- KPTT HD2: Denver, Colorado (Switched to Evolution)
- KXXM HD2: San Antonio, Texas (Discontinued programming)
- KYLD HD2: San Francisco, California (Switched to "FuZic" programming in 2011)
- KZZP HD2: Phoenix, Arizona (Switched to "Verizon New Music Channel" sometime in 2013, now known as "The Hot Spot")
- WMTX HD2: Tampa, Florida (Discontinued Pride Radio in early spring of 2011, reactivated as classic hits branded "Thunder Tampa Bay")
- WDTW-FM HD2: Detroit, Michigan (Switched to "The Alternative Project", a modern rock format, in November 2011)
- WKSL HD2: Raleigh, North Carolina (Switched to Christian contemporary music)
- WHYI-FM HD2 and HD3: Miami, Florida (HD2 Switched to "Evolution Radio" programming, now both discontinued)
- WXKS-FM HD2: Boston, Massachusetts (Switched to WEDX simulcast, now simulcasts WBZ all-news programming)
- WLDI HD2: West Palm Beach, Florida (Discontinued programming)
- WHYN-FM HD2: Springfield, Massachusetts (Switched to "Verizon New Music Channel" programming, now hip-hop formatted 97.3 The Beat.)
- WXXM HD2: Madison, Wisconsin (Discontinued programming)
- KQQL HD3: Minneapolis, Minnesota (Switched to sports radio programming as "KFAN Plus")
- K244FE: Minneapolis, Minnesota (Switched to sports radio programming as "KFAN Plus" via KQQL HD3)
- WYYY HD2: Syracuse, New York (Switched to commercial-free 1980s music as simulcast of "iHeart80s")
- KUBE HD2: Seattle, Washington (Discontinued programming)
- WBZY HD2: Atlanta, Georgia (Switched to WBZW simulcast; moved to HD3)
- KBIG HD2: Los Angeles, California (Switched to KLAC simulcast, known as "AM 570 LA Sports" on March 12, 2026)

== Competitors ==
- Channel Q (Audacy)
