= K244FE =

Radio station in Calhoun Beach, Minneapolis, Minnesota

Coordinates: 44°58′33.9″N 93°16′20.8″W

Relays KQQL-HD3, Anoka
- "Calhoun Beach" (Minneapolis, Minnesota); United States
- Broadcast area: Minneapolis-St. Paul
- Frequency: 96.7 MHz
- Branding: KFAN Plus

Programming
- Format: Sports
- Affiliations: Fox Sports Radio; Minnesota Golden Gophers women's basketball St. Paul Saints

Ownership
- Owner: Educational Media Foundation
- Operator: iHeartMedia
- Sister stations: K273BH; KDWB-FM; KEEY-FM; KFXN-FM; KQQL; KTCZ-FM; KTLK; W227BF

History
- First air date: June 12, 2015
- Former call signs: W244CS (2014–2015)
- Call sign meaning: (serially assigned)

Technical information
- Licensing authority: FCC
- Facility ID: 147274
- Class: D
- ERP: 170 watts
- HAAT: 229 m (751 ft)

Links
- Public license information: Public file; LMS
- Webcast: Listen Live
- Website: kfanplus.iheart.com

K244FE (96.7 FM, "KFAN Plus") is a translator broadcasting the sports talk format of the HD3 subcarrier of iHeartMedia's KQQL. Licensed to Minneapolis' "Calhoun Beach" neighborhood, it serves the Minneapolis-St. Paul metropolitan area inside the I-494/I-694 beltway. The station is owned by Educational Media Foundation. All the offices and studios are located in St. Louis Park and the transmitter is atop the IDS Center in downtown Minneapolis.

== History ==
As of October 2, 2014, KQQL's Kool 1-0-80s format was being broadcast on KQQL's HD3 channel and on translator W244CS (96.7 FM) in the Southeast metro. On June 12, 2015, KQQL-HD3 and W244CS flipped to 96.7 Pride Radio, a Dance/CHR format targeting the Twin Cities' LGBT community.

On August 27, 2018, the station flipped to sports talk as KFAN Plus, an extension of sister station KFXN-FM that airs the national Fox Sports Radio lineup, also carried on KQQL-HD3. KFAN Plus will also serve as the flagship station of Minnesota Golden Gophers women's basketball. The station can also air the start of another play-by-play broadcast if KFAN 100.3's broadcast is running long.

On August 7, 2019, iHeartMedia announced its intent to sell the station to the Educational Media Foundation as part of a complex swap deal. The transaction was consummated on March 31, 2020.
