= KQQL =

Classic hits radio station in Anoka–Minneapolis–St. Paul, Minnesota

Coordinates: 45.338861°N 93.391056°W

- Anoka, Minnesota; United States
- Broadcast area: Minneapolis-St. Paul metropolitan area
- Frequency: 107.9 MHz (HD Radio)
- RDS: PI: 1BEB; PS: Kool 108 Title Artist
- Branding: Kool 108

Programming
- Language: English
- Format: Classic hits
- Subchannels: HD2: BIN 93.3 (African American oriented-All-news radio); HD3: KFAN Plus (Sports)
- Affiliations: Premiere Networks; Minnesota Wild Radio Network

Ownership
- Owner: iHeartMedia; (iHM Licenses, LLC)
- Sister stations: K244FE; K273BH; KDWB-FM; KEEY-FM; KFXN-FM; KTCZ-FM; KTLK; W227BF

History
- First air date: August 1, 1968
- Former call signs: KTWN-FM (1968–1983); KGBB (1983–1984); KMGW (1984–1986); KMGK (1986–1988)
- Call sign meaning: Play on the word "Cool"

Technical information
- Licensing authority: FCC
- Facility ID: 54457
- Class: C
- ERP: 95,000 watts 100,000 with beam tilt
- HAAT: 333 m (1,093 ft)
- Translators: HD2: 93.3 W227BF (Shoreview); HD3: 96.7 K244FE (Calhoun Beach)

Links
- Public license information: Public file; LMS
- Webcast: Listen live (via iHeartRadio)
- Website: kool108.iheart.com

KQQL (107.9 FM, "KOOL 108") is a commercial radio station serving the Minneapolis-St. Paul radio market and is licensed to suburban Anoka. It plays classic hits and is owned by iHeartMedia, Inc. The studios and offices are on Utica Avenue South in St. Louis Park.

KQQL has an effective radiated power (ERP) of 95,000 watts (100,000 with beam tilt). The transmitter is off St. Francis Boulevard NW in Nowthen, Minnesota. It broadcasts digital radio using iBiquity's HD Radio format, with the HD2 subchannel airing the African-American-oriented Black Information Network service. The HD3 subchannel carries a sports radio service known as "KFAN Plus". FM translator W227BF (93.3 FM) is fed by the HD2 subchannel, while K244FE (96.7 FM) is fed by the HD3 subchannel.

== Programming ==
KQQL broadcasts a classic hits radio format known as "Kool 108". KQQL mainly plays music from the 1980s and 1990s, with a few songs from the 1970s and 2000s that are heard daily. KQQL uses the slogan "Minnesota's Best Variety of the 80s and 90s". KQQL switches to all Christmas music from early November to December 26, using the slogan "Minnesota's Christmas Station".

== History ==
=== KTWN ===
On August 1, 1968, the station signed on as KTWN, the sister station of KANO in Anoka (1470 AM, now KMNQ in Brooklyn Park). At first, KTWN's effective radiated power was 57,000 watts on a 320-foot tower.

In the 1970s, KTWN cycled through several formats. For a time, it played beautiful music, then had a short stint as a classical music station, beginning September 1, 1974. Then, it tried a full-service Middle of the Road (MOR) format, focusing on the northern suburbs of the Twin Cities. From 1978 to 1983, KTWN carried a jazz format. At the time, the station was operated by Jack Moore, who had previously run WAYL, the market's leading beautiful music station.

=== B108 and Magic 108 ===
The station was sold to Colorado-based Sunbelt Communications, with the new owners immediately switching the station's format to a soft adult contemporary and oldies hybrid on September 24, 1983. The call sign became KGBB ("B108").

Later, the station became "Magic 108" with the call letters KMGW (later KMGK). The station's signal limitations were a hindrance, with competition from full-market stations such as WLTE and KSTP-FM.

In the mid-1980s, KMGK got permission from the Federal Communications Commission (FCC) to become a full-powered station, increasing power to 100,000 watts on a tower more than 1,000 feet in height above average terrain (HAAT), making the station's signal equal to other major Twin Cities FM stations. In 1988, KMGK was acquired by Trumper Communications.

=== KQQL ===
On September 30, 1988, at noon, after playing "Do You Believe in Magic?" by The Lovin' Spoonful, KMGK began stunting with a loop of various versions of the 1960s oldie "Louie, Louie". At noon on October 3, the station was reborn as KQQL, "Kool 108". While some FM stations had oldies as part of their playlists, KQQL was the first all-oldies FM station in the Twin Cities area. The first song on "Kool 108" was "Rock and Roll Is Here to Stay" by Danny & the Juniors.

The oldies format originally spanned the era of the early days of rock 'n roll music of the mid-1950s through the late 1960s. In the mid-1990s, some 70s hits were added. By 2000, the 1950s hits were removed, and the station shifted to hits of the 1960s and 1970s (with an occasional early 1980s song thrown in). For a brief time, KQQL was the FM flagship station for Minnesota Vikings football, with games being simulcasted with co-owned sports radio station KFAN.

=== Clear Channel ownership ===
In 1997, KQQL was acquired by Chancellor Media Corporation. Three years later, Chancellor was merged into Clear Channel Communications, based in San Antonio. (In 2014, Clear Channel changed its corporate name to iHeartMedia, Inc.)

In the early 2000s, KQQL began switching to Christmas music during the holiday season. It would usually begin on the Friday before Thanksgiving at 5 p.m. and conclude at midnight on Christmas Day. KQQL would compete with CBS-owned adult contemporary station WLTE until that station flipped to country music in December 2011, which ended its Christmas music tradition. In 2008, KQQL started the Christmas music earlier than usual, on the weekend of November 15. This may have been triggered by WLTE flipping its format earlier in the week.

KQQL's format was tweaked again in 2006 to an oldies/classic hits hybrid, positioned as "Super Hits of the 60s & 70s". Some 1980s hits were also included. KQQL also began airing "American Top 40" episodes from the 1970s hosted by Casey Kasem. KQQL also aired classic 1980s American Top 40 shows for a short time, but the station dropped the AT40 '80s broadcasts after the station cut back on playing '80s music.

On April 28, 2009, KQQL released all on-air personalities, including morning host Lois Mae and radio veteran Dan Donovan. Disk jockeys on KQQL were voicetracked from other Clear Channel stations, with news coming from KOA in Denver. However, in mid-2010, KQQL hired several new on-air personalities, including radio veteran and KARE 11 reporter Lee Valsvik.

On December 27, 2009, the station tweaked to a classic hits format and dropped most 1960s titles while adding some 1990s songs, with a primary focus on 1970s and 1980s hits. Direct competition with Cumulus Media's WGVX (Love 105) ended when that station switched formats to adult contemporary music in early 2012. At this time, AT40: The 80s returned, and Dick Bartley's Classic Countdown was added to the lineup.

In January 2019, KQQL slightly tweaked its format and officially dropped all music from the 1960s and many hits from the 1970s while adding some 2000s music. At the same time KQQL began airing The Ellen K Show on Saturday mornings. The station's format now primarily focuses on music from the 1980s and 1990s.

== HD Radio ==
=== HD2 ===
On April 25, 2006, Clear Channel Communications announced that KQQL's HD2 subchannel would carry a format focusing on hit music from the 1980s. The HD2 station, called "Kool 1-0-80s", showcased every song to hit the Top 40 in the 1980s.

During the summer of 2011, the HD2 subchannel changed its programming to a simulcast of AM all-sports sister station KFXN. On September 8, 2011, the "Score" sports format began airing exclusively on KQQL-HD2. The Score's former signal on 690 AM flipped to ethnic programming, mainly serving the Hmong community.

In August 2012, the HD2 subchannel was changed back to "Kool 1-0-80s", now using iHeartRadio's "My 80s" service, with many of the same 1980s hits format it had before.

On May 23, 2014, KQQL-HD2 flipped to urban adult contemporary and began simulcasting on FM translator W227BF (93.3 MHz), licensed to Shoreview, Minnesota. Soon after, it started stunting with several types of music, changing every few days.

On June 13, 2014, KQQL-HD2 changed to an alternative rock format, branded as "ALT 93.3".

On June 29, 2020, 15 iHeart stations in markets with large African-American populations, including W227BF/KQQL-HD2, began stunting with African-American speeches, interspersed with messages such as "Our Voices Will Be Heard" and "Our side of the story is about to be told," with a new format slated to launch on June 30. On June 30, it was made official that W227BF/KQQL-HD2 would be a charter affiliate of iHeart's new Black Information Network, which is an all-news format specifically geared toward African-American listeners.

=== HD3 ===
Around the same time, KQQL's "Kool 1-0-80s" format moved to KQQL's HD3 channel, feeding FM translator W244CS at 96.7 MHz, licensed to Calhoun Beach. The translator serves the Southeast metro area of the Twin Cities. On June 12, 2015, KQQL-HD3 and W244CS changed to an LGBTQ-centric dance/EDM format from iHeartRadio, branded as "96.7 Pride Radio".

On August 27, 2018, KQQL-HD3 and K244FE dropped the Pride Radio format and flipped to all-sports as "KFAN Plus". Pride Radio now is heard on the HD2 subchannel of co-owned KDWB-FM.

=== HD4 ===
In July 2023, KQQL activated its HD4 sub-channel, simulcasting the K-Love network relayed on translators K260BA (99.9 FM) and K288GR (105.5 FM) due to ongoing tower maintenance at its primary station, KTCZ-HD2.

As of August 31, 2023, K288GR and K260BA have switched their relay back to KTCZ-HD2, as tower maintenance has been completed.
