= IDS Center =

Skyscraper in Minneapolis, Minnesota, US

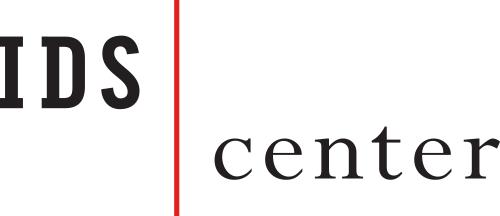

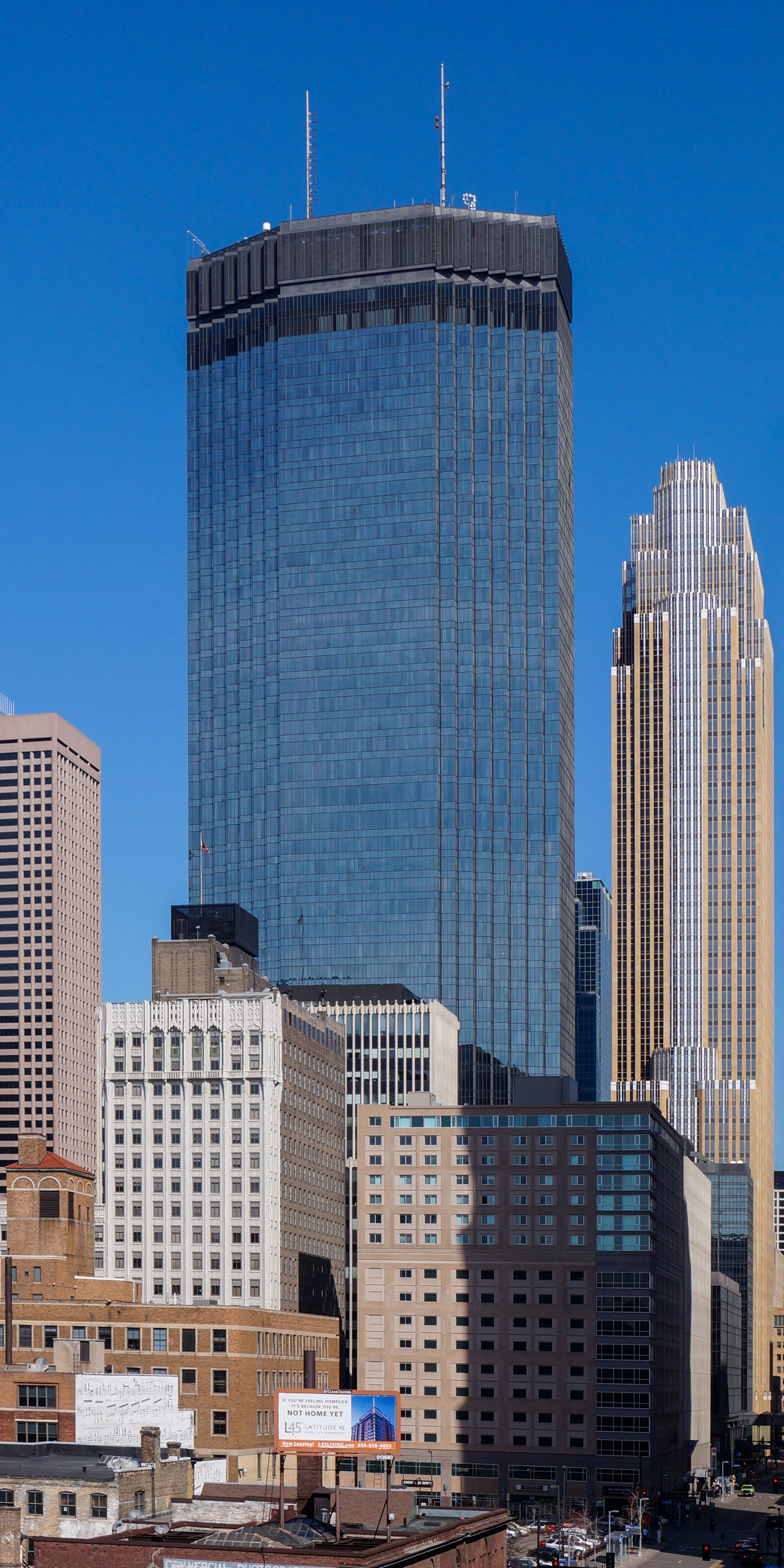
- The IDS Center in 2016

General information
- Status: Completed
- Location: 80 8th Street S., Minneapolis, Minnesota
- Coordinates: 44°58′34″N 93°16′21″W
- Construction started: 1969; 57 years ago
- Completed: 1973; 53 years ago

Height
- Antenna spire: 910 ft (280 m)
- Roof: 792 ft (241 m)

Technical details
- Floor count: 57 (52 occupied)

Design and construction
- Architects: Philip Johnson; Johnson/Burgee Architects; Edward F. Baker Associates
- Developer: Investors Diversified Services (now known as Ameriprise Financial, Inc.)
- Structural engineer: Severud Associates

Website
- ids-center.com

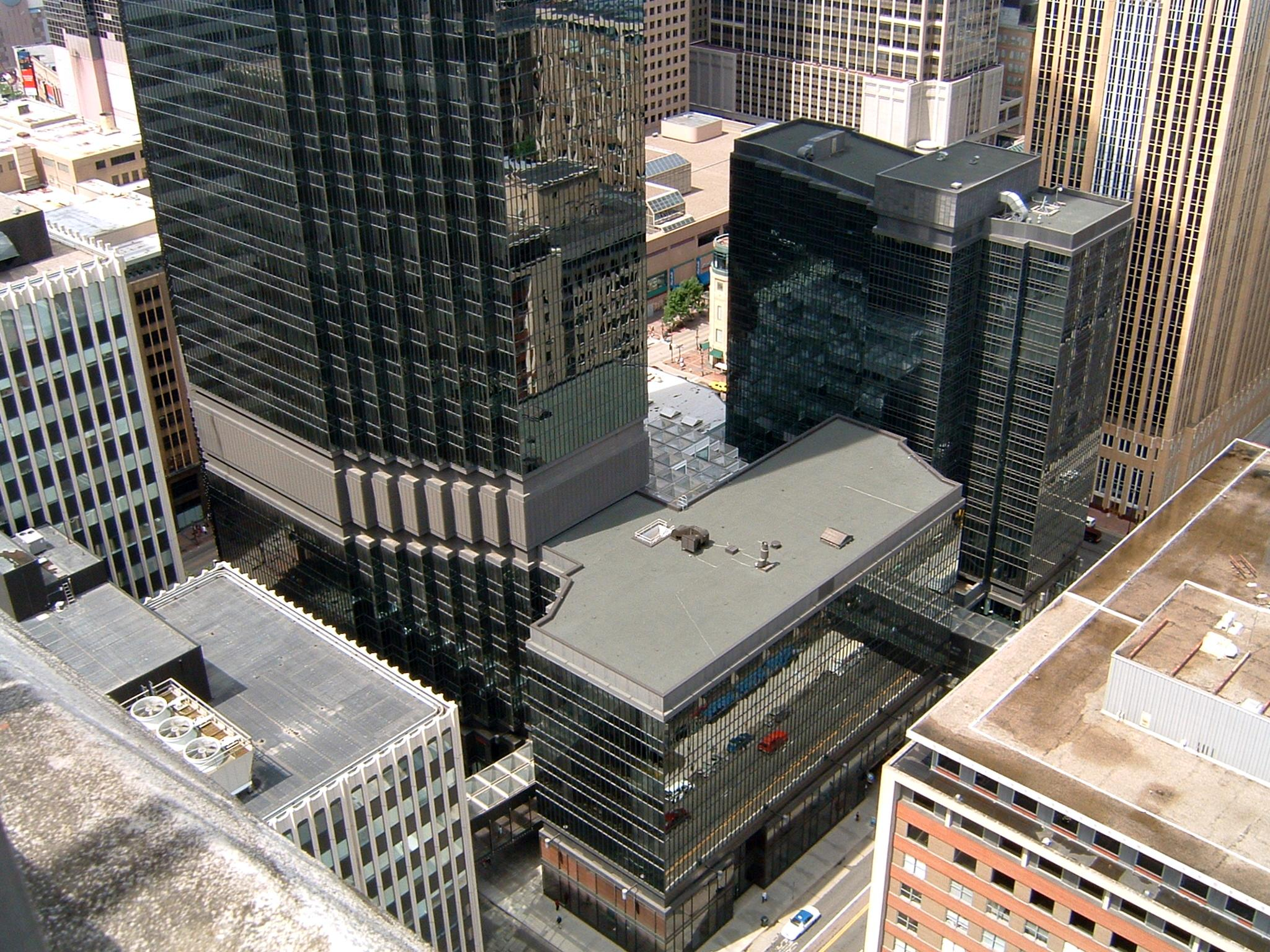
Lower structures

The IDS Center is an office skyscraper located at 80 South 8th Street in Minneapolis, Minnesota. Completed in 1973, it is the tallest building in Minneapolis, and the tallest building in the state at a height of 792 feet (241 m). It originally stood 775 feet 6 inches (236.37 m), though a 16-foot (4.9 m) garage for window washing equipment was added between 1978 and 1979. The structure rises to 910 feet (10,900 in) when including communications spires on the roof, indisputably the highest points in the city. The IDS was constructed as the headquarters of Investors Diversified Services, Inc.—now Ameriprise Financial. It also housed the headquarters of Dayton Hudson Corporation (now Target Corporation) from 1972 until 2001.

The complex consists of five parts: the 57-story IDS Tower itself at 8th Street & Nicollet Mall, an eight-story annex building along Marquette Avenue, the 19-story Marquette Hotel at 7th Street & Marquette Avenue, and a two-story retail building that was originally dominated by Woolworth's. These four buildings are joined by the seven-story Crystal Court.

The 57-story IDS became the tallest skyscraper in Minneapolis when it surpassed the height of the 32-story Foshay Tower in 1972, ending that building's 43-year reign over the city skyline. Construction of the building was followed with great interest, and the topping-off ceremony was a major civic event in the city. In addition to being taller, IDS occupies a much larger footprint than the obelisk-like Foshay. It was the 16th tallest building in the world on completion, and the third tallest constructed that year.

== History ==
=== Construction ===
A lobby and shopping area at the bottom of the tower is known as the Crystal Court and provides skyway connections between the tower and four adjacent blocks. The Concourse level is occupied by Globe College and University; originally this floor was an extension of the Crystal Court retail space and included a single-screen movie theater and shops. The building had a 51st floor observation deck until 1984; thousands of people came for one last visit on December 31, 1983. This floor is now office space. The 50th floor contained an east-facing "Orion Room" restaurant, a north-facing bar and cocktail lounge, a private south-facing dining club ("Tower Club"). The west-facing "University of Minnesota Alumni Club" closed to the public in 1994. Today, the entire 50th floor consists of four large ballrooms with a single central kitchen. The rooms are collectively known as "Windows at Marquette," and they serve as banquet space for the Marquette Hotel.

Because of the IDS Center's peculiar and unique stepback design, termed "zogs" by its architect, Philip Johnson, each floor has up to 32 corner offices. The area of Nicollet Mall in front of the IDS Center is familiar to television viewers: the character of Mary Richards on The Mary Tyler Moore Show was seen on Nicollet Mall looking at an IDS shop in the opening montage of the show. Across South 7th Street from the IDS was Donaldson's Department Store, in front of which she tossed her hat in the air at the end of the opening sequence. A statue commemorating that shot stands approximately at the camera location of the view, created and maintained by TVLand. She is also seen in the show opening dining with then-husband Grant Tinker at what is now the terrace of Jolliet House on the hotel's third floor, overlooking the Crystal Court. Diners can still sit at the "Mary Tyler Moore Table."

The building has not been without structural problems. Since soon after its construction, the Crystal Court had issues with water leaking through the roof after rain or snow due to effects of Minnesota's extreme freeze-thaw cycle. There are also frequent problems in the winter when ice falls from the tower and onto the court's glass roof panels, often breaking through. Occasionally the court will be roped off to prevent injury to the public. The Center and Crystal Court were devastated by a summer wind storm in June 1979 that led to much glass breakage. The entire Crystal Court was sealed off by plywood barriers while this was repaired.

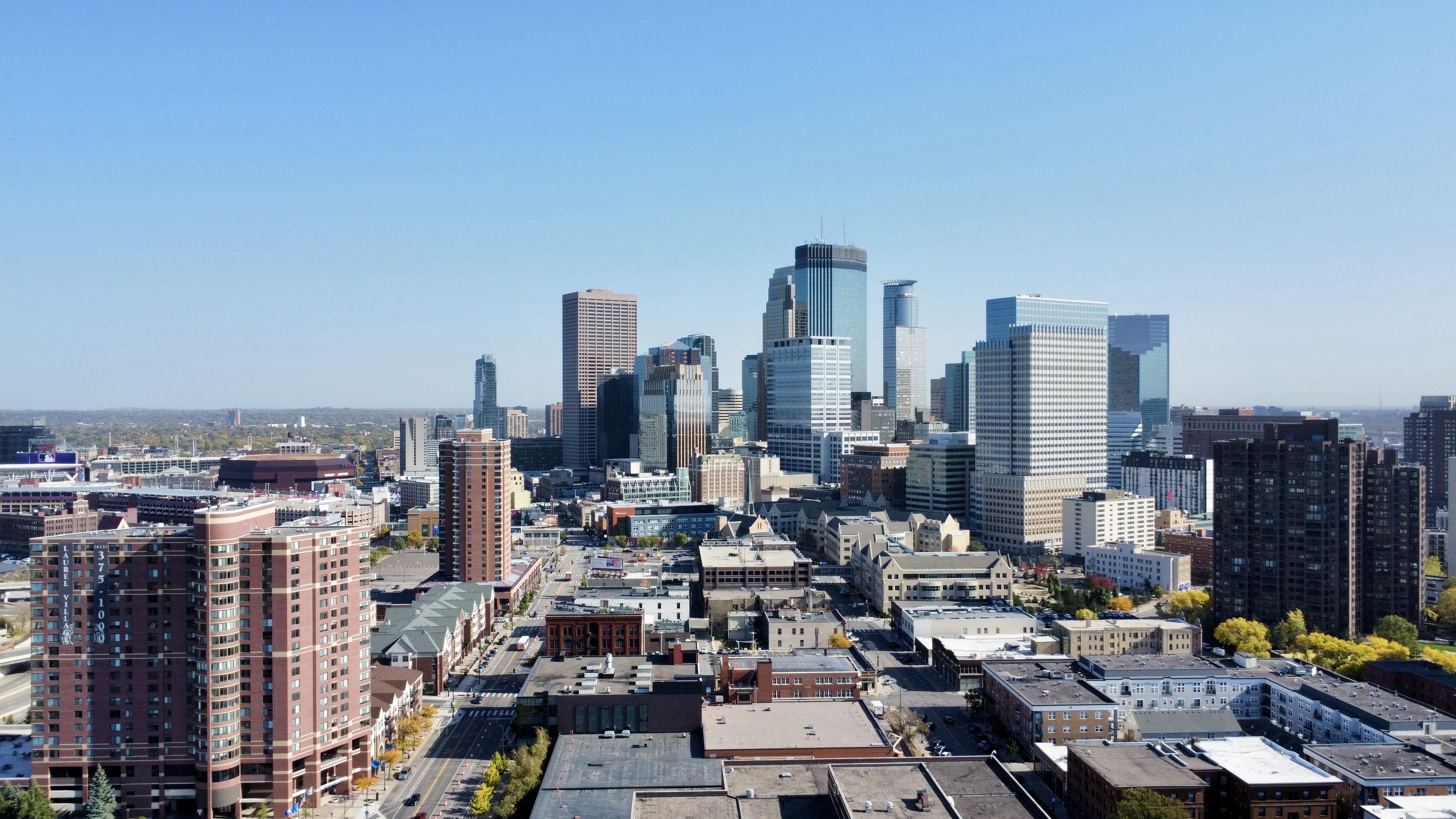
IDS Center within downtown Minneapolis

=== The battle for tallest status ===
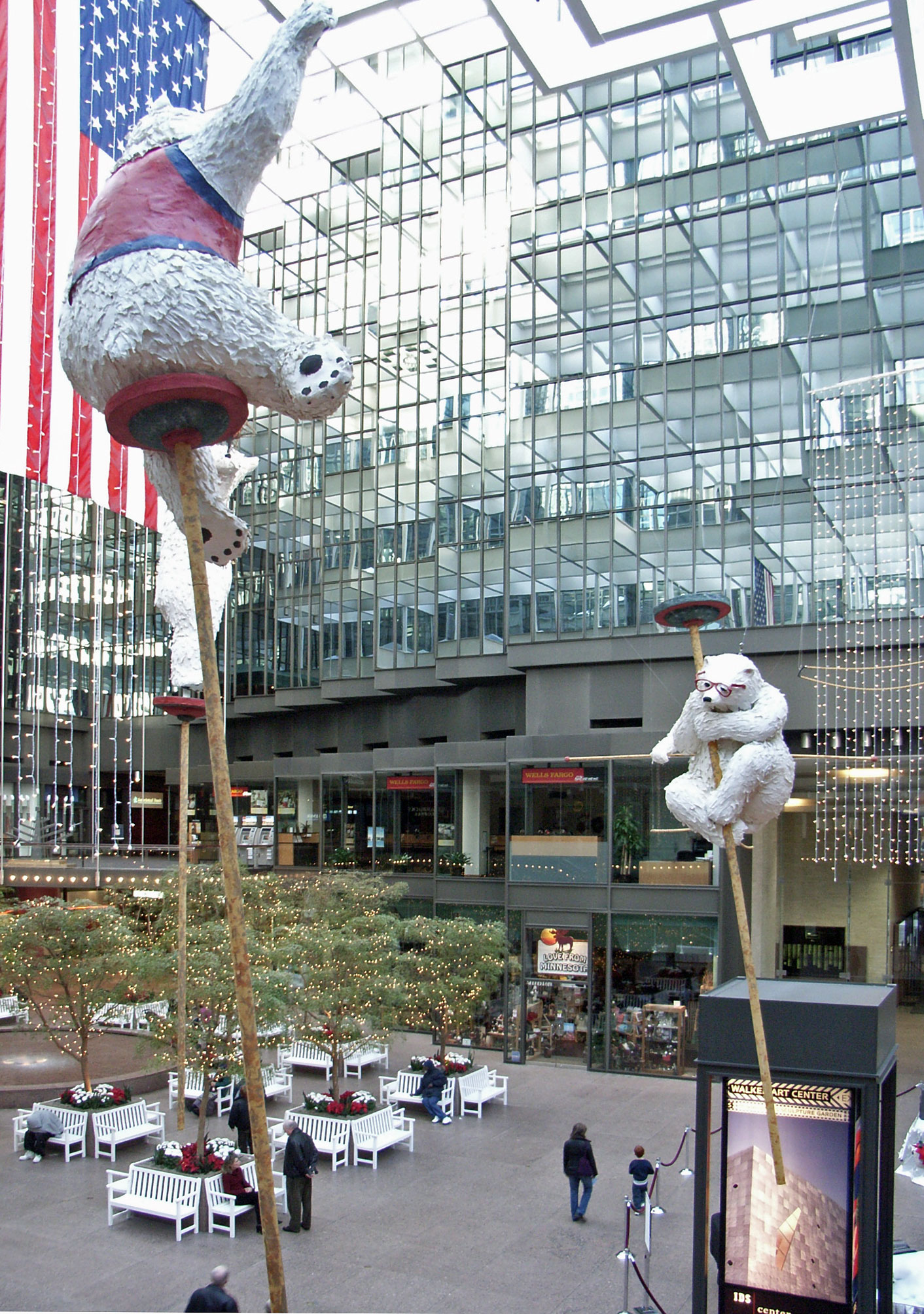
The Crystal Court

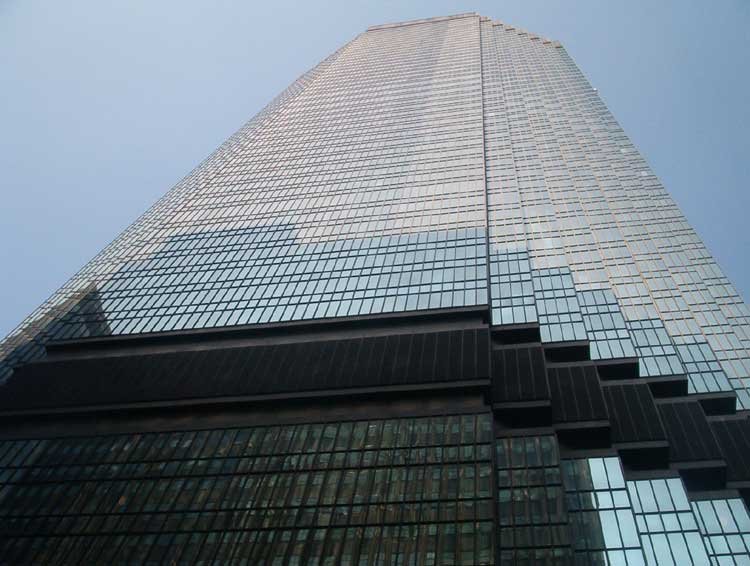
IDS Tower from the ground

The owners of the Capella Tower (formerly First Bank Place) and the architects behind the design stated that it rose 774 feet (236 m) tall upon its completion in 1992. However, the height had been increased due to an engineering need, according to Tom O'Mara, one of the construction managers at the time of Capella Tower construction. There were some ventilation ducts near the roof that required about 14 more inches (36 cm) of height. The construction team added an extra 10 inches (25 cm) to that, bringing the building to a total of 776 feet 0 inches (236.52 m).

In the years following completion, the actual height eventually became known as it was published in almanacs and other listings of building height. The owners of the Capella Tower were hesitant to claim that their building was taller than IDS, and usually deferred the honor to the more well-known structure. As area journalists reported on the sale of the IDS Center to the John Buck Company in 2004 and the death of designer Philip Johnson in 2005, they came face-to-face with the fact that the roof of the tower was one foot lower than its neighbor.

Emporis restored the IDS Center to first-place status in the city in February 2005 by including the height of the window-washing garage, although that has not completely ended the dispute. A spokesperson for the Council on Tall Buildings and Urban Habitat, which sometimes handles height disputes, stated that it would be unlikely for the garage to be included in the official height because many would not consider it to be an integral part of the building's design.

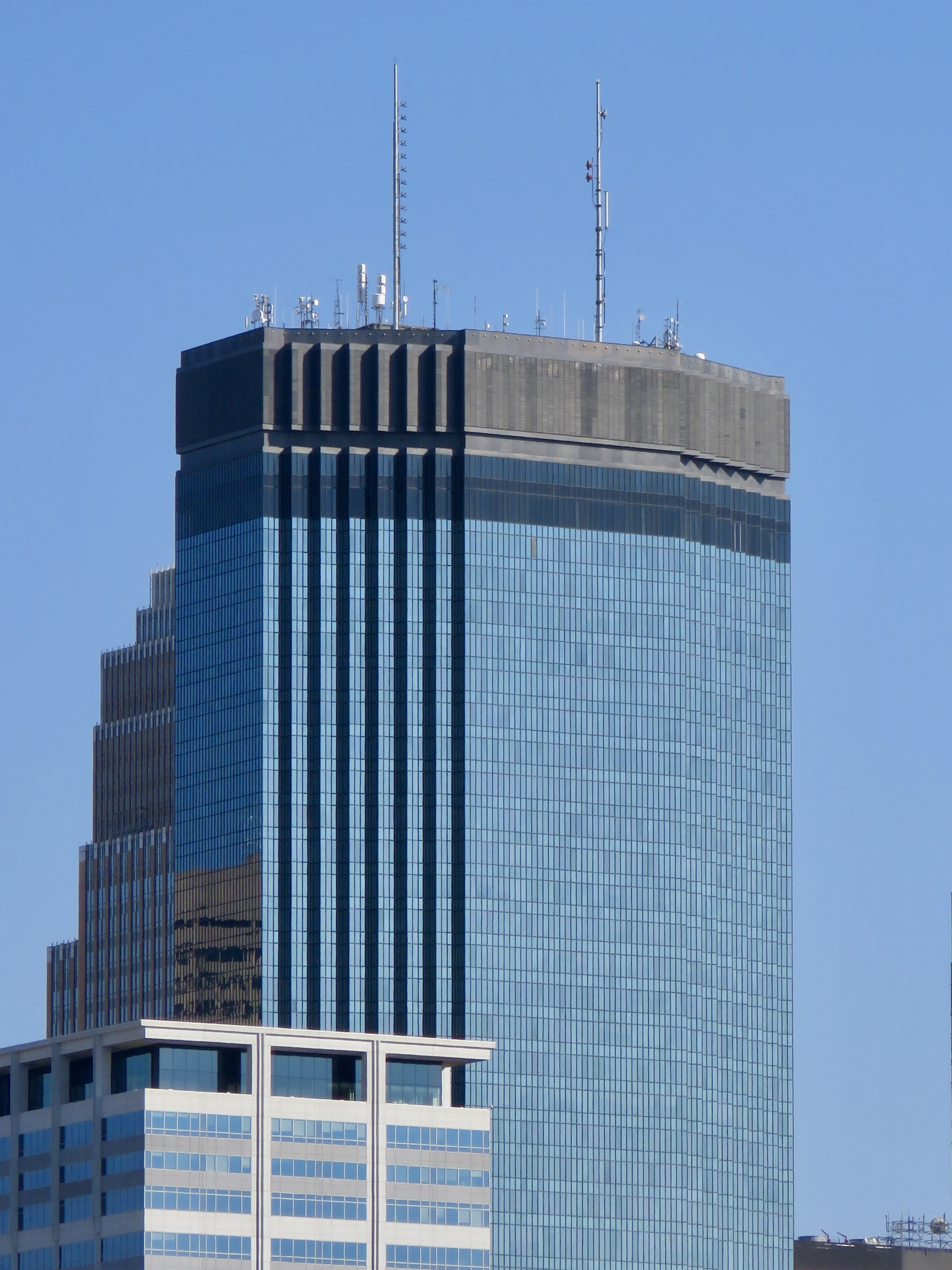
IDS Center viewed from a distance

== Ownership ==
The first owner was Investors Diversified Services (now Ameriprise Financial) from 1972 to 1981. Construction cost US$13.5 million. It was then acquired by Oxford Development in 1981 for US$200 million. The building was purchased by the John Buck Company in December 2004 for US$225 million. Just over a year later in January 2006, the company began efforts to sell the property; in August 2006 it was sold to The Inland Real Estate Group of Companies, Inc., for approximately $277 million. Beacon Investment Properties of Hallandale Beach, FL purchased the building from Inland in April 2013 for approximately $253 million. Beacon and a joint venture of Harel Insurance Investments & Financial Services Ltd and Menora Mivtahim Insurance Ltd., both based in Tel Aviv, have owned the building since then.

== Broadcasting ==
Communication spires on top of the building tower to 910 feet (280 m), the highest point in Minneapolis. A number of major FM radio stations which formerly broadcast from the site now use the IDS as a backup in case their primary location in Shoreview, Minnesota were to fail. One of the most notable broadcasters was 99.5 WLOL until the pop format signed off in late February 1991. In fact, one well-known reference was "From the top-top-top of the IDS Center, 99 and 1/2 WLOL Minneapolis-Saint Paul!" In 2009 the equipment was removed and digital towers were added for the national digital switch. Some television broadcasters using the towers include Univision affiliate WUMN-LD and KMBD-LD, which broadcasts HSN programming, while the area's major television stations use them for their STL towers and microwave relays to Shoreview and their studios and live trucks.

=== FM ===
FM radio stations
Frequency	Call sign	Name	Format	Owner
90.3	KFAI	Fresh Air Radio	Community	Fresh Air, Inc.
90.7	K214DF (KTIS-AM Translator)	Faith 900	Christian	University of Northwestern - St. Paul
93.3	W227BF (KQQL HD-2 Translator)	BIN 93.3	All-news radio	Educational Media Foundation (operated by iHeartMedia)
95.3	KNOF	PraiseLive	Contemporary Christian	Educational Media Foundation (operated by Christian Heritage Broadcasting)
96.7	K244FE (KQQL HD-3 Translator)	KFAN+	Sports	Educational Media Foundation (operated by iHeartMedia)
99.9	K260BA (KFXN HD-3 Translator)	K-Love	Contemporary Christian	iHeartMedia
102.5	K273BH (KTCZ HD-3 Translator)	Hot 102.5	hip hop	Educational Media Foundation (operated by iHeartMedia)
103.5	K278BP (KTLK-AM Translator)	News Talk 1130	News/Talk	iHeartMedia
105.7	WWWM-FM (WGVX Simulcast)	Love 105	Soft AC/Oldies	Cumulus Broadcasting

=== Television ===
Channel	Callsign	Affiliation	Branding	Subchannels		Owner
(Virtual)	Callsign	Affiliation	Branding	Channel	Programming	Owner
14.2	K14RB-D	EWTN	EWTN	14.1; 14.3; 14.4	Program guide Local programming EWTN	St. Michael Broadcasting, Inc.
15.1	KWJM-LD	Infomercials		15.2; 15.3; 15.4	Novelisima; Infomercials; Jewelry TV	DTV America Corporation
25.1	KJNK-LD	Telemundo	Telemundo Minneapolis	25.2; 25.3; 25.4; 25.5; 25.6	SBN; Cozi TV; LX; Evine; GetTV	DTV America Corporation
33.1	K33LN-D	QVC	QVC	33.2; 33.4; 33.5; 33.6; 33.7; 33.8	HSN; Shop LC; Shop HQ; 3ABN; NTD America; Classic Reruns TV	DTV America Corporation
43.1	KMBD-LD	QVC	QVC			DTV America Corporation
49.1	KMQV-LD	Infomercials		49.2; 49.3; 49.4	Timeless TV; Infomercials; Infomercials	DTV America Corporation

== Tenants ==
The tower is leased to businesses. The IDS has 1.4 million square feet (120,000 m^{2}) of office and retail space. Tenants include:

- Taft
- Gray Plant Mooty
- Dady & Gardner, P.A.
- Hubert White
- Ballard Spahr
- Merchant & Gould
- U.S. Bancorp
- Hall Law

== See also ==
- List of tallest buildings by U.S. state
- List of tallest buildings in Minnesota

Preceded by Foshay Tower	Tallest building in Minnesota; 1972—Present; 241 metres (791 ft)	Succeeded by None
