= WCCO (AM) =

- Minneapolis, Minnesota; United States
- Broadcast area: Minneapolis–Saint Paul
- Frequency: 830 kHz
- Branding: News/Talk 8•3•0 WCCO (frequency pronounced on-air as "eight-three-oh")

Programming
- Format: News/Talk
- Affiliations: ABC News Radio; Premiere Networks; Westwood One; Minnesota Twins

Ownership
- Owner: Audacy, Inc.; (Audacy License, LLC)
- Sister stations: KMNB; KZJK

History
- First air date: September 4, 1922
- Former call signs: WLAG (1922–1924)
- Call sign meaning: Washburn Crosby Company (former owner of station)

Technical information
- Licensing authority: FCC
- Facility ID: 9642
- Class: A
- Power: 50,000 watts
- Transmitter coordinates: 45°10′39.9″N 93°20′55.8″W (main); 45°13′29.9″N 93°23′59.8″W (aux)
- Repeater: 102.9 KMNB-HD2 (Minneapolis)

Links
- Public license information: Public file; LMS
- Webcast: Listen live (via Audacy)
- Website: www.audacy.com/wccoradio

WCCO (830 kHz) is a commercial radio station in Minneapolis, Minnesota, owned by Audacy, Inc. Its studios and offices are located on Second Avenue South in Downtown Minneapolis. WCCO features a news/talk format, with frequent newscasts and sports programming. Local hosts are heard during daytime, including Chad Hartman, Vineeta Sawkar, Jordana Green, Adam Carter and Jason DeRusha. World and national news is supplied by ABC News Radio. WCCO is the flagship radio station for the Minnesota Twins baseball team and Minnesota Timberwolves.

WCCO is a Class A clear-channel station. With 50,000 watts of power (the maximum permitted) and a nondirectional signal, WCCO reaches much of Minnesota and parts of Wisconsin and Iowa by day, along with a wide area of the Central United States and Central Canada at night. The transmitter is located off Coon Rapids Boulevard at Lily Street NW in Coon Rapids. It is also heard on the second HD Radio subchannel of co-owned KMNB (102.9 FM).

== History ==
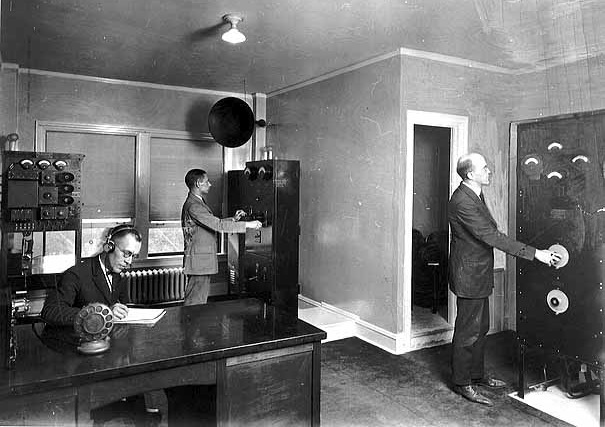
WLAG transmitter room in the Loring Park neighborhood's Oak Grove Hotel

=== Early years ===
WCCO first signed on the air on September 4, 1922. Its original call sign was WLAG, owned by the Cutting & Washington Radio Corp., and was known as "the Call of the North". The studios were in the Oak Grove Hotel near Loring Park in Minneapolis. The station soon had financial trouble and was deleted on September 19, 1924.

A week later WLAG was relicensed, still at 720 kHz. It was then owned by the "Washburn-Crosby Company" (forerunner of General Mills). Prior to its return debut, the call sign was changed to WCCO, reflecting the new owner's initials. Broadcasts resumed a few days later on October 2, 1924, from its current transmitter site in Coon Rapids, and with studios in the then-new Nicollet Hotel.

In 1927, WCCO was one of the original 21 stations of the NBC Red Network. It carried NBC's slate of dramas, comedies, news, sports, soap operas, game shows, and big-band broadcasts during the "Golden Age of Radio". WCCO joined the CBS Radio Network on December 5, 1928. CBS bought WCCO from General Mills in 1932. In 1932, Al Sheehan established the WCCO Artist's Bureau to manage the radio station talent.

=== 1950s to the 1990s ===
In 1952, CBS sold majority control of WCCO to the Murphy and McNally families, who formed Midwest Radio and Television as a holding company for WCCO radio and its new co-owned television station, Channel 4 WCCO-TV. CBS was forced to sell off its stake in the WCCO stations in 1954 due to Federal Communications Commission ownership limits in effect at the time. CBS reacquired the WCCO stations outright in 1992 when Midwest Radio and Television merged with the network.

In the 1950s, as network programming was shifting from radio to television, WCCO switched to a full-service middle-of-the-road format, including popular music, news, sports, and talk. Robert Ridder became president of WCCO in 1952.

During the fall of 1979, WCCO-TV experienced a labor dispute when the International Brotherhood of Electrical Workers (IBEW), the union representing many of the station's technical and production personnel, went on strike. Despite the walkout, WCCO maintained its daily broadcast schedule for both its television and radio operations. The station used non-striking employees, including management and news personnel, to cover the essential functions. For WCCO-TV, this meant that News Director Ron Handberg and anchor Skip Loescher were notably involved in producing and presenting the news, as seen in broadcasts from the period. The labor action also affected WCCO Radio, where station managers and sales staff took over air shifts to replace striking announcers and engineers.

In the 1980s, the playlist shifted from middle-of-the-road music toward adult contemporary. The music was gradually phased out by the early 1990s, when the format was changed to news, talk, and sports. From 1947 to 1996, WCCO and WCCO-TV won 12 George Foster Peabody Awards, more than any other Twin Cities broadcast outlet.

=== Signal and transmitter ===
In the early days of radio, WCCO was a powerful force in the development of better and more powerful transmitters. On November 11, 1928, with the implementation of the Federal Radio Commission's General Order 40, WCCO changed its frequency to 810 kHz and was granted clear-channel status. It began broadcasting with 50,000 watts for the first time in September 1932. In the 1930s, two additional 300-foot towers were added to increase the range of the station's signal.

WCCO constructed a new 654-foot tower in Coon Rapids in 1939. This is the same tower used today, although the broadcast frequency was changed to 830 kHz as a result of the 1941 North American Regional Broadcasting Agreement.

Due to the station's power, as well as Minnesota's mostly flat landscape (with near-perfect ground conductivity), WCCO boasts one of the largest coverage areas in the country, with a footprint equivalent to that of a full-power FM station. During the day, it provides at least secondary coverage to most of Minnesota's densely populated area (as far north as Duluth and as far south as Rochester), plus portions of northern Iowa and western Wisconsin. Under the right conditions, it reaches into portions of South Dakota.

At night, the station's signal typically reaches across 28 U.S. states and three Canadian provinces. Certain conditions can make the signal reach much farther. Legendary station personality Howard Viken said that he once picked up the station while he was in the military during World War II, stationed at Guadalcanal in 1943.

=== Transmitter move to Ramsey ===
In late 2024, station owner Audacy filed an application with the FCC to permanently relocate the WCCO transmitter, ending nearly a century of operation from its historic Coon Rapids site. The move was driven by the high value of the station's land, a nearly 24-acre parcel used for transmission since 1925, which Audacy had placed into a real estate holding company, Audacy Atlas, LLC, for future sale and commercial redevelopment. The FCC granted a construction permit for the permanent relocation to the station's existing auxiliary site in Ramsey approximately 4 miles (6 km) northwest of the Coon Rapids location. The new site will maintain the station's 50 kW daytime power but will reduce nighttime power slightly to 45 kW to comply with modern FCC clear-channel rules. The move was expected to take place ahead of the Coon Rapids site's 100th anniversary of operation in March 2025. As of October 2025, however, the main transmitter tower still exists. The tower in Ramsey stands at 419 feet, shorter than the 639-foot tower at the historic site, but is not expected to cause a noticeable change in the signal for most Twin Cities listeners. The relocation is part of a broader corporate strategy by Audacy to sell valuable real estate assets across the United States to reduce debt, a strategy codified through its special purpose entity, Audacy Atlas, LLC. Audacy filed for prepackaged Chapter 11 bankruptcy in early 2024, with its debt reduction plan incorporating the sale of its non-core transmitter sites, which have become highly valuable due to surrounding commercial and residential development. The WCCO move mirrors similar permanent relocations in other major markets, most notably in Chicago, where Audacy has also filed to move the transmitters for its two clear-channel AM stations, WBBM and WSCR, from their long-time Bloomingdale, Illinois, site to a smaller, co-located facility to allow the sale of that land for an estimated $18 million.

=== Severe weather coverage ===
WCCO has a longtime reputation of being the station to tune in for emergency information, especially severe weather and school closings in winter. Listeners would call in during severe weather events and describe what they were seeing at their locations, supplementing information from the National Weather Service. For many years, WCCO was famous for its early adoption of a "klaxon" alert tone for tornado warnings, produced by an ashtray placed on top of a Degaussing machine. WCCO is the Primary Entry Point station for the Emergency Alert System in Minnesota.

For a series of live public-service emergency broadcasts in 1965 – the St. Patrick's Day blizzard, the record April floods on the Minnesota and Mississippi Rivers, and the May 6 onslaught of 24 tornado touchdowns in the Twin Cities area – the station earned the George Foster Peabody, DuPont, and Sigma Delta Chi awards.

=== Changes in ratings ===
Logo as "News Radio 8•3•0 WCCO"

WCCO was the top-rated station in the Twin Cities for decades until shifting demographics and a decline in listening to AM radio caused a drop in the Arbitron and Nielsen ratings. Several FM stations, including classic rock 92.5 KQRS-FM and Top 40 101.3 KDWB-FM were able to overtake it. One sign of the changing times: the well-known farm report was dropped in early 2004, reflecting the fact that many farmers began to rely more on the Internet for such information and that the number of farmers in Minnesota has drastically shrunk since the station first began broadcasting (although agriculture remains vital to the region).

In August 2008, as a cosmetic change to make WCCO in sync with other CBS talk radio stations, the station changed from "News/Talk 8•3•0 WCCO" to "News Radio 8•3•0 WCCO". On September 15, 2011, WCCO was awarded the NAB Marconi Radio Award for Large Market Station of the Year.

=== Sports ===
WCCO became the radio home of Minnesota Timberwolves basketball team starting with the 2011–2012 season, acquiring the broadcast rights from rival KFAN. The Timberwolves would leave WCCO after the 2022–2023 season, moving their games to the iHeartRadio app with select games on KFXN-FM. WCCO started broadcasting University of St. Thomas football beginning in the 2011–2012 season. The St. Thomas football broadcasts would be carried on WCCO until the 2019–2020 season with no season in 2020 due to the COVID-19 pandemic. With the move to Division I starting in the 2021 season, the football games would move to KSTP. WCCO was the former home of Minnesota Golden Gophers athletics and Minnesota Wild hockey. WCCO had been the radio flagship of the Minnesota Vikings football team from 1961 to 1969, 1976 to 1984, 1988 to 1990, and 1996 to 2000.

WCCO broadcast Minnesota Twins baseball from their arrival in the Twin Cities in 1961 until 2007. In 2007, the Twins began producing the games themselves while selling Twin Cities broadcast rights to KSTP beginning in the 2007 season. On November 17, 2017, WCCO announced that Twins broadcasts would return to the station beginning in the 2018 season.

The Minnesota Timberwolves returned to WCCO for the 2026-2027.

WCCO previously broadcast play-by-play for the Minneapolis Millers in the summer, and Minnesota Golden Gophers football in the fall.

=== Entercom ownership ===
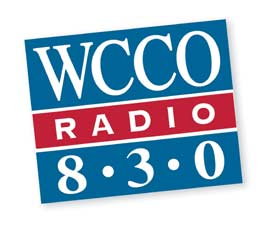
Longtime WCCO Radio logo

On February 2, 2017, CBS Radio agreed to merge with Entercom. The sale was conducted using a Reverse Morris Trust to shield the deal from taxes. While CBS shareholders retain a 72% ownership stake in the combined company, Entercom was the surviving entity, with WCCO Radio no longer being co-owned with WCCO-TV. The merger was approved on November 9, 2017, and was consummated on November 17.

In 2018, WCCO returned to the moniker "News/Talk 8•3•0 WCCO" with its logo reflecting the change.

=== AM stereo history ===
After nearly a year of work to outfit the station and prepare programming in stereo, on October 2, 1985, WCCO began broadcasting in AM stereo using the Motorola C-QUAM system. The move by the large market dominating WCCO to adopt AM stereo received attention from local and national news outlets. WCCO discontinued broadcasting in AM stereo around the turn of the millennium.

=== HD Radio ===
In 2005, WCCO began broadcasting its signal in the HD Radio format. WCCO programming is also simulcast on 102.9 KMNB-HD2. In March 2018, WCCO shut down its HD Radio signal on AM 830.

=== Shift from CBS to ABC ===
On March 20, 2026, CBS News announced that CBS News Radio would be shuttered on May 22, 2026, after 99 years of operation. WCCO Radio at the time had been a CBS News Radio affiliate continuously since 1932. On May 21, 2026, beginning with the 3:00pm newscast, WCCO Radio became an ABC News Radio affiliate.

== Notable alumni ==
- Cedric Adams
- Henry Adams Bellows
- Steve Cannon
- Herb Carneal
- Sid Hartman
- Eleanor Mondale
- Tim Russell
- Ray Scott
- Al Sheehan

Preceded by None	Radio Home of the Minnesota Twins; 1961–2006	Succeeded by KSTP; 2007–2012

Preceded by KQGO; 2017	Radio Home of the Minnesota Twins; 2018–present	Succeeded by none
