= KEEY-FM =

Country music radio station in the Minneapolis–St. Paul metropolitan area

Coordinates: 45.058306°N 93.124389°W

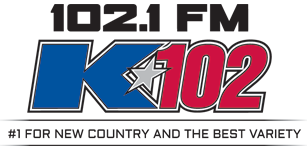
- St. Paul, Minnesota; United States
- Broadcast area: Minneapolis-St. Paul
- Frequency: 102.1 MHz (HD Radio)
- RDS: PI: 1B10; PS/RT: K*102 Title Artist
- Branding: K102

Programming
- Format: Country
- Subchannels: HD3: WIXK simulcast (Hmong music, news, and talk)
- Affiliations: Premiere Networks

Ownership
- Owner: iHeartMedia, Inc.; (iHM Licenses, LLC)
- Sister stations: K244FE; K273BH; KDWB-FM; KFXN-FM; KQQL; KTCZ-FM; KTLK; W227BF

History
- First air date: October 1, 1967
- Former call signs: WMIN-FM (1967–1968)
- Call sign meaning: Key (used with previous format)

Technical information
- Licensing authority: FCC
- Facility ID: 59967
- Class: C
- ERP: 100,000 watts
- HAAT: 315 m (1,033 ft)
- Translator: HD3: 106.7 K294AM (West St. Paul)

Links
- Public license information: Public file; LMS
- Webcast: Listen Live
- Website: k102.iheart.com

KEEY-FM (102.1 MHz, "K102") is a commercial FM radio station licensed to St. Paul, Minnesota, and serving the Minneapolis-Saint Paul radio market and Western Wisconsin. It broadcasts a country music radio format and is owned by iHeartMedia, Inc. The radio studios and offices are on Utica Avenue South in St. Louis Park. KEEY-FM carries two syndicated programs from co-owned Premiere Networks: After MidNite with Granger Smith, heard overnight, and The Bobby Bones Show, heard Sunday evenings.

KEEY-FM has an effective radiated power (ERP) of 100,000 watts. The transmitter is on Ramby Avenue in Shoreview, near Interstate 694. KEEY-FM broadcasts using HD Radio technology; the HD3 subchannel simulcasts the Hmong language format originating on WIXK (1590 AM); the HD3 sub-channel feeds FM translator K294AM (106.7 MHz).

== History ==
=== KSTP-FM ===
The 102.1 FM frequency was originally home to KSTP-FM, which launched in 1947. The station was the FM counterpart of Hubbard Broadcasting's AM 1500 KSTP. However, few people owned FM radios in those days, and management was doubtful the station could become profitable. Hubbard shut down the original KSTP-FM in 1952, and the license was cancelled. The current KSTP-FM was re-established in 1965 on its present-day 94.5 MHz frequency.

=== WMIN-FM ===
The owners of WMIN (1400 AM) relaunched the station on October 1, 1967. It originally had the WMIN-FM call sign and it simulcast the AM station. It became KEEY ("Key") in 1968, ending the simulcast.

The FM station programmed Drake-Chenault's automated "Hit Parade '68", an adult contemporary format with no disc jockeys. Drake's promotional materials indicated it was targeted to the 18-49 age group, for "those people who may not like Top 40 as a steady diet, and those who are not particularly fond of some of the outdated MOR stations".

=== K102 ===
In 1971, KEEY-FM switched to beautiful music, along with its AM sister station of the same name. The FM station was later co-owned with another AM station, WDGY. KEEY-FM played quarter hour sweeps of mostly instrumental cover versions of popular songs, along with some Broadway and Hollywood show tunes.

KEEY-FM and WDGY switched to the current country music format in late 1982 as "K102." KEEY-FM quickly became a dominant force in the market. In 2000, the station was acquired by AMFM, Inc., a forerunner of today's iHeartMedia, Inc.

=== Awards ===
K102 was named "Major Market Station of the Year" by the Country Music Association in 2005 while being programmed by Gregg Swedberg. In 2010, K102 was the Academy Of Country Music's "Major Market Station of the Year." In 2012, The K102 Wake-up Crew with Donna and Muss won the CMA award in the "Major Market Personalities" category. The station and its personalities have been nominated many times for CMA and ACM awards, along with honors from industry publications such as Radio & Records.

== HD Radio ==
On April 25, 2006, iHeartMedia (then known as Clear Channel Communications) announced that KEEY-FM would broadcast an HD Radio signal. KEEY-FM's HD2 signal, known as "K*102 New", carried a format focusing on new hits from today's and up-and-coming country music stars. Formerly during Christmas time, KEEY-HD2 carried KQQL's classic hits format when that co-owned station switched to all Christmas music.

In November 2018, KEEY-FM launched an HD3 sub-channel carrying a soft adult contemporary format known as "The Breeze", as well as relaunching and rebranding KEEY-FM HD2 as "The Wolf 102.1 HD2".

In May 2019, KEEY-HD2 reverted to its previous "K102 New" branding. Competitor country station KMNB now calls itself "102.9 The Wolf."

In August 2019, KEEY-FM HD2's Country music format was replaced with Christian Contemporary music from iHeart's "UP!" network.

As of April 2021, the "Breeze" programming that was airing on KEEY-HD3 moved to the HD2 sub-channel. The HD3 sub-channel was then flipped to a simulcast of Hmong language WIXK, and became the new relay for FM translator K294AM (106.7 MHz, licensed to West St. Paul).
