= KTLK =

News/talk radio station in the Minneapolis–St. Paul metropolitan area

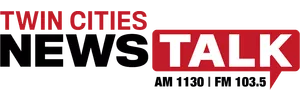
- Minneapolis, Minnesota; United States
- Broadcast area: Minneapolis–Saint Paul
- Frequency: 1130 kHz
- Branding: Twin Cities News/Talk AM 1130, and FM 103.5

Programming
- Format: Conservative talk
- Network: Fox News Radio
- Affiliations: Premiere Networks; Compass Media Networks; NBC News Radio; Golden Gophers Hockey

Ownership
- Owner: iHeartMedia, Inc.; (iHM Licenses, LLC)
- Sister stations: K244FE; K273BH; KDWB-FM; KEEY-FM; KFXN-FM; KQQL; KTCZ-FM; W227BF

History
- First air date: December 23, 1923
- Former call signs: KFMT (1923–1925); WHAT (1925–1926); WGWY (1926); WDGY (1926–1991); KFAN (1991–2011); KTCN (2011–2014)
- Former frequencies: 1300 kHz (1923–1927); 1140 kHz (1927); 1150 kHz (1927); 1140 kHz (1927); 1050 kHz (1927–1928); 1410 kHz (1928); 1390 kHz (1928–1929); 560 kHz (1929); 1180 kHz (1929–1941)
- Call sign meaning: "Talk"

Technical information
- Licensing authority: FCC
- Facility ID: 59961
- Class: B
- Power: 50,000 watts (day); 25,000 watts (night)
- Transmitter coordinates: 44°38′48″N 93°23′31″W
- Translator: 103.5 K278BP (Cottage Grove)
- Repeater: 100.3 KFXN-HD2 (Minneapolis)

Links
- Public license information: Public file; LMS
- Webcast: Listen live (via iHeartRadio)
- Website: twincitiesnewstalk.iheart.com

KTLK (1130 kHz) – branded Twin Cities News/Talk AM 1130, and FM 103.5 – is a commercial radio station licensed to Minneapolis, Minnesota. It broadcasts a conservative talk radio format to the Twin Cities radio market and is owned by iHeartMedia, Inc. The studios are on Utica Avenue South in St. Louis Park.

By day, KTLK is powered at the maximum for AM stations, 50,000 watts, and uses a directional antenna at all times. At night, to avoid interference with other stations on 1130 AM, it reduces power to 25,000 watts and uses a nine-tower array. The transmitter is on Flag Trail at Prairie Hills Lane in Prior Lake. Programming is also heard on 175-watt FM translator K278BP at 103.5 MHz in Cottage Grove. It is also simulcast over an HD Radio subchannel of 100.3 KFXN-FM.

== History ==
=== Early years ===
KTLK is the second-oldest continuously operating station in Minnesota. It signed on the air on December 23, 1923. Dr. George W. Young was the founder of the station, first using the sequentially assigned call sign KFMT. (KUOM, Minnesota's oldest station, began operation in 1922.)

Dr. Young first operated the station from his house in Minneapolis at 2219 Bryant Ave. North, cycling through other call signs WHAT, WGWY ("W-George W. Young"), and finally WDGY ("W-Dr. George Young") in the next two years until being chastised by the government for changing too frequently. The station kept the WDGY call letters until 1991. WDGY operated on eight frequencies over its early years. In the 1930s, it was heard on 1180 AM, transmitting with 5,000 watts by day and 1,000 watts at night. The station shared time with at least four local stations, including WRHM and WCAL during its early years.

After moving the station out of his home, Young located the studios at several locations: his storefront at 909 West Broadway in Minneapolis, the West Hotel on Hennepin at 5th Street and 609 South Second Avenue. Minnesota native George Putnam began his broadcasting career at WDGY in 1934. Putnam later gained fame as a Los Angeles television news anchor and talk show host. In 1938, WDGY relocated its studios to the Nicollet Hotel at Washington Avenue and Nicollet Avenue after WCCO had vacated the facility for new studios at Second Avenue South and Seventh Street.

=== Move to 1130 AM ===
WDGY made its final frequency move, to 1130 AM, in 1941 as required by the North American Regional Broadcasting Agreement (NARBA), under which most American, Canadian and Mexican AM radio stations changed frequencies. Transmitter sites are known to have been at Young's house, at the Broadway address, and from 1927 to 1949 at Superior Boulevard (aka Wayzata Boulevard, Highway 12) and Falvey Cross Road in St. Louis Park on the grounds of a fox farm. Dr. Young died on April 27, 1945.

Later studio locations included Bloomington (two locations), 611 Frontenac Place in St. Paul and, in 2004 at the Clear Channel Communications consolidated offices in St. Louis Park at 1600 Utica Avenue. The transmitter site moved in 1949 to Bloomington, at a site that would within a decade overlook I-35W, using a nine-tower array covering several acres.

=== TV experiments ===
In 1933, Dr. Young was granted a license for W9XAT, an experimental mechanical television station that is credited with the first telecast in Minnesota. It is believed that the first transmission of the 45-line system occurred on August 4 of that year, featuring a handshake between WDGY station personality Clellan Card and Minneapolis mayor William Kunze. Later on, 120- or 125-line tests were done on the VHF band. The station pushed the technological limits of mechanical scanning and provided a lot of interesting exercises for WDGY engineers, but Dr. Young never got into regular broadcasts, as he did not want attention from radio hobbyists. The license for W9XAT expired in 1938, partly because mechanical television development was discouraged by that point. After 64 years of dormancy, an amateur radio group in the area acquired the W9XAT call sign in 2002 with the intention of using it for mechanical and narrow-bandwidth TV experiments.

Nine years after the 1945 death of Dr. Young, WDGY in 1954 flirted with modern TV, applying for Channel 9 in the Twin Cities. Also applying were competing radio stations WLOL and KEYD. WDGY and WLOL withdrew their applications at the last minute and the new station was awarded to KEYD, going on the air in January 1955, today’s KMSP-TV.

=== Top 40 ===
The station was one of the first stations in the country to program rock and roll music full-time, starting a Top 40 format in 1956. It was then owned by Todd Storz, one of the pioneers in programming to the baby boom generation with some of its music rarely heard on "white" radio stations. Storz's stations were heavy on promotion, headline-grabbing contests, and high-profile disc jockeys, using echo-chamber voice processing. Other Twin Cities station owners resented the attention WDGY received, but several jumped on the Top 40 bandwagon. Storz is credited with energizing radio at a time when network programming was moving to television.

WDGY gained the nickname Weegee after a time, a sounding out of the call letters. By the 1960s, the station didn't use the name itself, but the name stuck among people in the radio industry. From about 1955 to 1977, WDGY competed for youthful listeners with AM stations KSTP and KDWB, though WCCO remained the top station in the Twin Cities, with a mixture of middle of the road music (MOR), talk, news, sports and farm reports.

=== Country music ===
As the 1970s ended, young listeners began switching to the FM band to hear contemporary music. That prompted WDGY to change to a country music format on September 2, 1977. The only other stations playing country in Minneapolis were KTCR AM and FM (now KFXN and KTCZ). The AM was a daytimer powered at only 500 watts, while the FM's tower was only 150 feet tall, limiting both stations in coverage area.

In 1982, WDGY's sister FM station, KEEY, flipped to a country format as well. The AM station specialized in personality and several decades of country music, while the FM kept chatter to a minimum and played mostly contemporary country hits. In 1984, WDGY and KEEY were acquired by the Malrite Communications Group.

=== Talk and sports ===
The country format continued until April 16, 1990, when the station became "News Talk 1130, WDGY." Just prior to this, WDGY became the inaugural flagship station for the expansion Minnesota Timberwolves NBA team. The talk format gradually added more sports programming until the station switched to full-time sports talk programming on August 1, 1991. With the switch, the station adopted the KFAN call letters. Following this change, the WDGY call letters were moved to the 630 kHz frequency, which was formerly KDWB (now WREY). In 2000, KFAN and KEEY were acquired by Clear Channel Communications, the forerunner to current owner iHeartMedia.

KFAN's logo under previous sports format

KFAN experienced severe storm damage in April 2004 at its transmission site, when four of the nine towers at its directional array in Credit River Township (near Prior Lake, Minnesota) fell down.

=== Translator station ===
On August 22, 2010, KFAN's programming began simulcasting on 103.7 FM using translator station K279AZ. The translator broadcast from a tower atop the IDS Center. It previously was owned by the Educational Media Foundation, which used the signal to broadcast its K-LOVE Christian contemporary network prior to the translator's move from Cottage Grove.

However, within weeks of the upgrade the complaints were filed with the Federal Communications Commission (FCC) by listeners of KLZZ ("the Loon") in St. Cloud, also at 103.7 FM. Because translators are a secondary service, a translator's owner must either immediately fix the problem or shut the translator down. As a result of the interference complaints, on September 24, K279AZ's power was significantly reduced and the translator moved to 103.5 under Special Temporary Authority (STA) from the FCC, and would change call letters to K278BP.

=== Frequency switch ===
On August 8, 2011, Clear Channel Communications announced a two-way frequency swap flipping KFAN and KTLK-FM, effective August 15: KTLK-FM's talk format moved to AM 1130, while KFAN's sports programming moved to KTLK-FM's former frequency, 100.3 FM. FM listeners in Minneapolis, St. Paul and adjacent communities would be able to hear KTLK on FM, by listening to the translator station on 102.5 MHz (though this would later change to the aforementioned K279AZ).

=== KTLK-FM ===
In 2006, Clear Channel Communications decided to launch a talk radio station in the Twin Cities, in order to take advantage of its Premiere Radio Networks syndication arm and the company's recent launch of Fox News Radio. Clear Channel informed AM 1500 KSTP that it would not renew its contract to carry The Rush Limbaugh Show and it eventually did the same with KSTP's carriage of Sean Hannity. (After losing Limbaugh and Hannity, KSTP shortly switched to a Sports radio format.) Clear Channel decided to put a talk format using these and other Premiere Network hosts on one of its Twin Cities FM signals, choosing to discontinue smooth jazz on 100.3 FM.

Previous logo

On January 2, 2006, the company switched KJZI to talk, becoming the second commercial FM talk station in the area after female-oriented talk station WFMP. The new call letters on 100.3 were KTLK-FM. When KFAN and KTLK swapped formats and frequencies in August 2011, the KTLK call sign, however, did not move to 1130 because the KTLK call letters were already on a sister station in Los Angeles. Clear Channel instead chose the call sign KTCN for 1130. In early 2014, the Los Angeles station switched to the call letters KEIB, with 1130 adopting the KTLK calls on January 8, 2014.

== Programming ==
All of the station's weekday schedule comes from nationally syndicated shows, mostly from co-owned Premiere Networks: The Glenn Beck Radio Program, The Clay Travis and Buck Sexton Show, The Sean Hannity Show, The Joe Pags Show (from sister station WOAI San Antonio), The Jesse Kelly Show, Coast to Coast AM with George Noory and This Morning, America's First News with Gordon Deal (via Compass Media Networks).

Weekends feature shows on money, health, home repair, real estate, law, the military and technology, some of which are paid brokered programming. Weekend syndicated programs include Sunday Night with Bill Cunningham, The Kim Komando Show, At Home with Gary Sullivan, The Ben Ferguson Show and Bill Handel on the Law. KTLK carries Golden Gophers Hockey games from the University of Minnesota. National news comes from Fox News Radio and NBC News Radio.

Jon Justice and Andrew Lee hosted the weekday morning program, Justice and Drew, until Andrew's sudden death on June 25, 2022. Justice continued hosting the program solo until being laid off in June 2026.

== See also ==
- KFAN Antenna Network
- Transmitter Visit of KFAN
- KTCN (KFAN) Transmitter Site Tour and WDGY Transmitter Site Historical photos, courtesy former KFAN Chief Engineer Aaron White.
- WDGY call sign and technical history timeline, courtesy former KFAN Chief Engineer Aaron White
- University of Minnesota 1970 thesis on the history of WDGY at radiotapes.com
- Twin Cities Civil Defense Manual, circa 1951-53, courtesy Mark Durenberger
- WDGY brochure featuring the Happy Hollow Boys, approximately 1930 at radiotapes.com
- St. Louis Park Historical Society Twin Cities radio history
- Dismantling of WDGY tower at 909 West Broadway, Minneapolis, 1947 from MN Historical Society
- Radiotapes.com Many historic airchecks of WDGY dating back to 1938
- 1933 Modern Mechanix & Inventions magazine article about television authored by Dr. Young
- W9XAT: The Twin City Experimental Amateur Television Society
- Historical reference to 1954 applications for TV channel 9 by WDGY Radio and WLOL Radio, Box Office Magazine, April 24, 1954, page 71
