= KFXN-FM =

Sports radio station in the Minneapolis–St. Paul metropolitan area

Coordinates: 45.058278°N 93.124361°W

- Minneapolis, Minnesota; United States
- Broadcast area: Minneapolis-St. Paul
- Frequency: 100.3 MHz (HD Radio)
- Branding: 100.3 KFAN: The Fan

Programming
- Format: Sports
- Subchannels: HD2: KTLK simulcast (Conservative talk); HD3: K-Love (Christian adult contemporary); HD4: Hot 102.5 (Mainstream urban)
- Affiliations: Westwood One Sports; Fox Sports Radio; Minnesota Lynx (flagship); Minnesota Timberwolves (flagship); Minnesota Vikings (flagship); Minnesota Wild (flagship); Minnesota Golden Gophers football (flagship); Minnesota Golden Gophers men's basketball (co-flagship)

Ownership
- Owner: iHeartMedia; (iHM Licenses, LLC)
- Sister stations: K244FE; K273BH; KDWB-FM; KEEY-FM; KQQL; KTCZ-FM; KTLK; W227BF

History
- First air date: 1965
- Former call signs: WCTS-FM (1965–1993); WBOB-FM (1993–1997); WRQC (1997–1999); WLOL (1999–2003); KJZI (2003–2006); KTLK-FM (2006–2011)
- Call sign meaning: "The Fan" (the "X" substitutes for the "A"; the KFAN-FM calls were unavailable due to their use on a station in Texas)

Technical information
- Licensing authority: FCC
- Facility ID: 54458
- Class: C1
- ERP: 100,000 watts
- HAAT: 281 meters (922 ft)
- Translators: HD2: 103.5 K278BP (Cottage Grove); HD3: 92.1 K221ES (Albertville); HD3: 97.7 K249ED (Albertville); HD3: 99.9 K260BA (Coon Rapids); HD3: 105.5 K288GR (Bayport); HD4: 102.5 K273BH (Minneapolis)

Links
- Public license information: Public file; LMS
- Webcast: Listen Live
- Website: kfan.iheart.com

KFXN-FM (100.3 MHz) is a commercial radio station licensed to Minneapolis, Minnesota, broadcasting a sports talk format. The station is owned by iHeartMedia, and serves the Twin Cities market. KFXN-FM's transmitter is located in the suburb of Shoreview on KMSP-TV's tower. Its effective radiated power is 100,000 watts (including beam tilt). The station's main studios are in St. Louis Park.

KFXN-FM is the flagship station of the Minnesota Lynx, Minnesota Timberwolves, Minnesota Vikings, Minnesota Wild, and Minnesota Golden Gophers football.

At midnight on August 15, 2011, iHeartMedia (then known as Clear Channel Communications) swapped the formats of KFAN (1130 AM), and 100.3 FM's former conservative news/talk format KTLK-FM. The new KFXN-FM call sign, shared with former AM sister station KFXN, was adopted the same day.

== History ==
=== WCTS-FM ===
The station started broadcasting in 1965 as WCTS, with a non-commercial Christian format, consisting of mostly Bible teachings, by the Fourth Baptist Church in Minneapolis. WCTS took its call letters from its owner - the Central Theological Seminary. WCTS continues broadcasting on 1030 AM.

=== WBOB-FM ===
Startup company Colfax Communications purchased WCTS-FM for $10 million in early 1993. Part of the deal was that they needed to find an AM station for the Seminary to purchase in order to continue the format, which they did when they struck a deal to buy WMIN. Around the same time, Colfax took advantage of recently relaxed Federal Communications Commission (FCC) rules and became the Twin Cities market's first duopoly when they purchased KQQL to partner with the new station. Once WCTS switched frequencies in January, Colfax took the FM station off the air for a few months, eventually signing back on in late April with a two-week long comedy format as a stunt to create a buzz about the new station, with the permanent country music format debuting at 5 a.m. on May 13 as WBOB-FM ("Bob 100"). The slogan was "Turn your knob to Bob". WBOB faced stiff competition from the long established K102 and upstart KJJO-FM, which had switched to country only a few months prior. Despite this, WBOB was consistently the second highest-rated country station in the market behind K102, even finishing ahead of them in a few books. However, when KJJO left the format in 1995, it allowed K102 to aim their guns directly at Bob, a battle 100.3 soon lost swiftly.

=== WRQC ===
In 1996, both WBOB and KQQL were sold to Chancellor Broadcasting, which also owned KEEY, KFAN, KDWB, KTCZ and KTCJ. A format change for WBOB was expected, and on April 15, 1997, at 1:03 p.m., after an hour of stunting, WBOB became WRQC, broadcasting an active rock format with Howard Stern in the morning. WRQC took to the air as Real Rock 100, and then Rock 100.3.

Stern's show was a mild success in the market, but consistently finished second or third in the ratings, while only taking away a smaller than expected number of listeners from KQRS and Tom Barnard. In addition, like many other Stern affiliates, ratings for the station the rest of the day were poor, and not helped by KQRS' owners flipping its sister station, KEGE, to a similar hard rock format in 1997.

=== WLOL ===
WRQC and Stern left the Twin Cities airwaves at 10:30 a.m. on August 3, 1999, as the station began stunting by simulcasting co-owned KFAN (a harbinger of its future format), followed by simulcasts of cross-country sister stations KKSF in San Francisco, WTJM in New York City, and WUBT in Chicago. When the new format debuted at 3 p.m. on August 5, the format was 1970s-era classic hits, which eventually went to full-blown classic hits, as Classic Hits 100.3 WLOL. The first song after the relaunch was "The Bitch is Back" by Elton John. Although ratings were decent initially, the station's overall performance was disappointing.

During its period as WLOL, the station owners, Chancellor Broadcasting, merged with Capstar Broadcasting to form AMFM Inc., which was absorbed into Clear Channel Communications (now its current owners, iHeartMedia) the next year.

=== KJZI ===
On June 19, 2003, at noon, following a goodbye show, 100.3 changed to smooth jazz as Smooth Jazz 100.3 with new matching call letters KJZI. The last song on WLOL was "Tomorrow Never Knows" by The Beatles, while the first song on KJZI was Smooth Operator by Sade. This was the first smooth jazz station in the Twin Cities since KMJZ switched to modern AC in 1998.

When public broadcaster KBEM-FM, another jazz station, found itself in financial straits in early 2005, Clear Channel donated $25,000 to help keep it operating. KJZI and its sister station KTCZ carried announcements requesting support for KBEM-FM. The generous move was lauded by many in the media.

=== KTLK-FM ===
Logo used while as KTLK-FM

While satisfied with smooth jazz, Clear Channel was even more interested in launching a news/talk station in the Twin Cities, in order to air programming from company-owned Premiere Radio Networks and Fox News Radio. Having no available AM stations in the market on which they could run a news/talk format — (KFAN was already highly successful with their sports/talk format, and daytimer KFXN possessed too weak a signal), Clear Channel decided to put a talk format on one of their FM signals. The company had success with the introduction of news/talk on one of their Pittsburgh FM stations, WPGB, and was launching FM News/Talk in other markets. Since their other Twin Cities FM stations (KDWB-FM, KEEY-FM, KTCZ-FM, and KQQL) were already entrenched, management decided KJZI was the most expendable.

On January 2, 2006, KJZI switched to news/talk with new KTLK call letters, becoming the second FM talk station in the area after women-oriented WFMP. The station obtained the market rights to Rush Limbaugh and later Sean Hannity's radio programs from KSTP. A mix of local and syndicated hosts such as Glenn Beck and Laura Ingraham filled out the rest of KTLK's schedule, including former KSTP host Jason Lewis and paranormal talk show Darkness Radio. The station had also resumed carrying Vikings football.

Clear Channel also owned an AM news/talk station in Los Angeles, California, that used the KTLK call sign. The LA station became KEIB on January 2, 2014, after which Clear Channel reassigned KTLK to what was known as KTCN.

In the spring of 2008, former KTLK news director, Jeff Monosso, was honored with Congressional recognition for his reporting on the I-35W Mississippi River bridge collapse. He and host, Jason Lewis, were also honored by the Minnesota Associated Press for best spot news coverage.

=== KFXN-FM ===
On August 8, 2011, Clear Channel announced a two-way frequency swap that moved KTLK-FM's talk format to 1130 AM and a translator at 103.5 FM, while KFAN's Sports Talk format would move to 100.3 FM. The swap took effect on August 15, 2011. The low-power signal at 103.5 FM and the HD2 subchannel at 100.3 FM both underwent the same format swap as did 1130 AM. There were plans to simulcast the talk station's signal on FM translator 103.5 FM, but this had been delayed while seeking FCC approval. KTLK can currently be heard on translator K278BP (103.5 FM).

On September 27, 2023, the Minnesota Timberwolves and Lynx announced that KFXN-FM would become the broadcast radio home for both franchises. Every game would be aired on the iHeartRadio app, while select Timberwolves games and the majority of Lynx games would air on KFXN-FM. The Timberwolves had aired on the AM KFAN signal from 1991 to 2011, when they moved to WCCO.

== Programming ==
According to the Minneapolis Star-Tribune, KFAN in 2006 "...has morphed from a sports-talk station to a talk station that sometimes discusses sports".

=== Daily, Monday–Friday ===
The Power Trip Morning Show is hosted by Cory Cove, Chris Hawkey and Paul "Meatsauce" Lambert. Frequent guests on the show include Former WCCO-TV sports anchor Mark Rosen, former Minnesota Vikings linebacker Ben Leber, former Minnesota Wild player Mark Parrish, former Minnesota State Representative and wounded military veteran John Kriesel, Twins Geek John Bonnes, FanDuel Sports North reporter Marney Gellner, Zach Halverson, Max Fuller, and Carly Zucker.

92Noon is hosted by Paul Allen. Allen is the voice of the Minnesota Vikings Radio Network and Canterbury Park.

The Common Man Progrum is hosted by "The Common Man" Dan Cole and bridge producer Brandon Mileski. The show features a mix of sports and political discussions on the local and national level. WCCO-TV sports anchor Mark Rosen makes regular appearances on The Progrum Monday thru Thursday.

Bumper to Bumper is hosted by Dan Barreiro and sidekick/producer fan Justin Gaard. The show consists of Barreiro's insights on both popular culture and sports. Bumper to Bumper also features satirical call-in segments with eccentric Green Bay Packers fan Carl Gerbschmidt, who appears to be a fictional character.

=== Other programming ===
FAN Outdoors: Thursdays 6-8 PM, hosted by "The Captain" Billy Hildebrand and "Cold front" Mike Curry and Saturdays 6-8 AM by Hildebrand and Pheasants Forever member Bob St. Pierre. The hosts typically share their hunting and fishing experiences and strategies, along with insights on outdoor issues. One of the main weekly guests is local Minnesotan professional angler and fisher "Tackle" Terry Tuma, who gives weekly updates on where he is fishing and on how the waters are, fishing strategies including baiting and lures, and overall fishing banter. A sometimes weekly but mainly bi-weekly guest is naturalist, author, wildlife photographer and animal/bird professional Stan Tekiela. Tekiela provides deep and thorough analysis and information on current bird information such as feeding, nesting, breeding, behavior, migration and hatching of all the different bird species, as well as different animals around. Other guests usually include experts/professionals that relate to the current seasons (e.g. around/on spring fishing opener, they have fishing intensive guests).

In the Zone: Saturdays 8-10 AM, hosted by Dave Sinykin and former NBA player Trent Tucker.

Minnesota Viking Broadcast: Pregame coverage of Vikings games starts two hours before the day's Vikings game. Pregame was usually hosted by "Mr. Phunn" Joe Anderson; however, Anderson was let go sometime before 2009 and K102 KEEY-FM's Mike "Muss" Mussman took over the duties of pregame coverage. KFAN's Vikings broadcast team consists of Paul Allen on play-by-play, and color commentary done by former Vikings linebacker and assistant coach Pete Bercich. Sideline insight is brought to the game by former Viking Linebacker Ben Leber. The halftime report is hosted by Mike Mussman. The postgame report is also hosted by Mussman and includes interviews with multiple Vikings players and coaching staff.

Viking Fan Line: Starts right after the Vikings post-game report and lasts about two hours. Former NFL Wide Receiver Ron Johnson and morning show host Cory Cove take fan post-game reaction and provide their commentary on the game and the fans reactions. Prior to the 2016 season, former Vikings linebacker Ben Leber hosted the program along with Cove, and former Vikings linebacker E.J. Henderson would fill Ben Leber's seat when he was unavailable. Prior to Ben Leber, previous Vikings long snapper Mike Morris was the usual co-host. Other former Vikings have guest co-hosted the show in the past.

"Vikings Overtime" is the same format as Fan Line but hosted by 'Meatsauce' Paul Lambert from The PowerTrip Morning Show. Runs to provide content between fan line and the Sunday night football coverage on weeks where Vikings play the late game or the Sunday/Monday/Thursday night game the show is omitted.

Packer Preview: Sundays 8am-9am during the Green Bay Packers season, hosted by Dave Sinykin. The Preview examines the day's Packers game. Packer Preview is the only Packers show on KFAN and is very, very controversial among Viking fans. The show remains on air, however.

Fantasy Football Weekly: Saturdays during the football season and syndicated to other iHeartRadio sports stations around the country. Hosted by Paul Charchian since 1994. Former co-hosts include John Tuvey, Christian Peterson, and Bo Mitchell. The current hosts are Mat Harrison, Brian Johnson and Scott Fish. Typical shows will offer advice and predictions for almost 200 players each week. Fantasy football questions are answered on this show, primarily during "Lightning Round" at the end of the show. Other recurring segments include "Take a Chance on Me" and "Five Tough Questions". Callers are known to call a couple of hours before the show is on-air to be put on hold. During the MN Golden Gophers football season, show is usually moved to the 6-8 AM Slot or the 8-10 AM Slot.

Saturdays with Sauce: Saturdays 12–2. Hosted by The Power Trip Morning Show's Paul "Meatsauce" Lambert along with Eric "Nordo" Nordquist from noon to two, (but special shows such as NFL draft coverage shows, Vikings training camp specials, etc. can go over the normal time slot) on Saturday afternoons. Saturdays with Sauce also airs on other days for aforementioned reasons (Vikings training camp, etc.). During MN Golden Gophers Football season, is usually usurped. However, they will sometimes host MN Gophers fan line (MN Gophers whine line)

Tee to Green: Saturdays. Golf related show hosted by Dan Cole during the summer months, talks all things golf related with co-host and master teaching professional Craig Waryn. Also regular co-host is "Ping Guy" Paul Peterson.

Fox Sports Radio: The programming that is on when none of the programs above are on the air. Fox Sports Radio programming on KFAN includes The Ben Maller Show and multiple weekend shows. Fox Sports Radio is usually heard weeknights 9 P.M. to 5:30 A.M. and weekends when local programming or sports events are not happening.

Infinity Sports Network: The programming that can also be heard during the weekends (weekends only) in addition to Fox Sports Radio. The rotation is usually a pre-determined schedule but can be subject to change at any given time. Infinity joined KFAN's lineup sometime around the end of 2018/beginning of 2019 (under its former name, CBS Sports Radio) when NBC Sports Radio programming was removed and replaced by the former. At first there was more Infinity than Fox Sports Radio, but the rotation has since evened out, if not returned to more Fox Sports Radio.

Vikings Live/Vikings Country: Thursdays [usually] - almost always begins with Paul Allen (play-by-play voice of the Minnesota Vikings and host of the 9-noon weekday show) interviewing the Minnesota Vikings head coach (currently Kevin O'Connell) and other Vikings' coaching staff at Winter Park. Vikings Country live is usually right after; it usually takes place at Sky Deck Sports Grille & Lanes at the Mall of America. The second segment contains "The Scouting Report" where they discuss the previous football week/Vikings game as well as the upcoming week.

Minnesota Wild Broadcast: KFAN FM 100.3 is the official flagship home of the Minnesota Wild. Since the 2011-12 NHL season, KFAN has broadcast all Wild preseason, regular season and Stanley Cup Playoff games on the State of Hockey's top-rated sports talk station. Bob Kurtz (play-by-play), Tom Reid (analyst) and Kevin Falness (studio host) capture all of the action and suspense. Coverage begins with a 15-minute pre-game show. Conflicting games are moved to KOOL 108 FM. Additional Wild-related programming on KFAN features the “Wild Weekly” show and “Wild Fanline,” which airs after select Wild games.

Beyond The Pond: Hockey related show during the winter months. Hosted by former Minnesota Wild and Minnesota Gopher Jordan Leopold and former Minnesota Gopher Pat Micheletti, and Common Man Progrum bridge producer Brandon Mileski. Former Golden Gopher Nate Miller was a co-host until 2016, departing the show for other ventures. Kevin Falness is a typical fill-in when any of the hosts cannot be on-air. In the off-season, show is re-branded/re-titled "Beyond the Pod," correlating with the fact that it is only an all-podcast/podcast exclusive show.

Sunday Sermons: Hosted by Dan Barreiro. Short version of Bumper to Bumper, with KFAN former intern and weekend producer Ryan Donaldson. Show typically recaps past week and provides coverage of weekend events. During the Minnesota Vikings season, it is typically shortened to 1 hour (except in case of scheduled Sunday Night, Monday Night, Thursday Night games), generally providing in-depth and heavy analysis to the week's game ("pre-game to the pre-game")

=== Former programming ===
Rights to the Minnesota Timberwolves broadcasts were lost in 2006. KFAN had held these rights since the Wolves' inaugural season in 1989. The Wolves returned to KFAN beginning in the 2008–09 season, until the 2010–11 season, when the team moved to WCCO (AM). Video Games Weekly: was on Tuesday evenings hosted by Paul Charchian, who discussed new video games for many different platforms. The show was co-hosted by staff members of Game Informer Magazine, typically Managing Editor Andrew Reiner. Game Informer, owned by GameStop Corporation, is a monthly magazine based out of Minneapolis. Cory Cove sometimes joined to talk about games. Charchian joined fellow radio cohorts on "Saturdays with Sauce" when they have their annual Video Game bracket/tournament.

- P.A. and Dubay: Hosted by Paul Allen and Jeff Dubay. Consists of Minnesota Vikings news, University of Minnesota sports, some Minnesota Twins happenings, and news on the Minnesota Wild and Minnesota Timberwolves.
  - Paul Allen is known as the voice of the Minnesota Vikings, since he does the play by play for KFAN's broadcast of Vikings games. P.A. is the track announcer at the local horse racing track Canterbury Park. Paul Allen continues a solo show at the station.
- The Chad Hartman Show (2 pm-4 pm): Hosted by Chad Hartman, son of Twin Cities sportswriter Sid Hartman. The show features a mix of sports and current issues. On January 20, 2009 Hartman and Darren Wolfson were laid off from Clear Channel as part of company wide layoffs.
- Sludge and Lake Show: Hosted by Cory "Sludge" Cove and Henry Lake. Consisted of the latest in sports, entertainment, etc. The show last aired May 15, 2009.
- ESPN Radio: On when none of the programs above were on the air. ESPN Radio programming on KFAN included AllNight with Jason Smith and multiple weekend shows. The ESPN Radio affiliation moved to KSTP on April 12, 2010.
- NBC Sports Radio: Former national sports programming heard on weekends until sometime around the end of 2018-the beginning of 2019, when NBC Sports radio ceased operations as a 24/7 national sports programming network. Shows that could be heard included The best of PFT Live, which was a weekend show that would include bits and pieces from the previous week of PFT Live, a show hosted by Mike Florio and based on his website, Profootballtalk.com. Florio can still be heard during his appearances on Paul Allen's show from 9 A.M. to 12 P.M. daily, usually once a week.

== Former on-air staff ==
- Mike Morris, former co-host of The Power Trip Morning Show was let go amid budget cuts in late 2012. Formerly co-host of Radioactive Sports on Sportsradio 105 The Ticket (WGVX). When 105 The Ticket changed formats, Morris moved to 1500 ESPN.
- Jeff Dubay, after co-hosting the PA and Dubay show for ten years, Dubay was let go after a crack-cocaine charge in October 2008.
- Chad Hartman, former play by play announcer of Minnesota Timberwolves and son of Twin Cities Sports icon Sid Hartman, now host on WCCO radio
- Dave Huffman, former Minnesota Vikings guard and color commentator.
- Ryan Lefebvre, current radio play-by-play announcer of the Kansas City Royals.
- Michele Tafoya, sideline reporter for NBC Sunday Night Football (as of the 2013–14 season)
- Mark Rosen, longtime WCCO-TV sports anchor. Still makes regular guest appearances on current KFAN programming.
- Jesse Ventura, former wrestler and Governor of Minnesota.
- Wade Keller former host, is the founder of the Pro Wrestling Torch.
- Bob Yates
- Mike Woodley
- Joe Senser, Restaurateur and former Minnesota Viking color commentator.
- Greg Coleman, Did the pregame preach as well as sideline analysis and postgame interviews until the 2021 season where he announced his retirement.

== KFAN: The Restaurant ==
It opened in 2004 and closed in 2005. The food services were managed by Grand Management, which operates a chain of Sidney's restaurants in the Twin Cities. Clear Channel Communications considered it to be a pilot project and may have tried to create similar restaurants across the country if it succeeded. In September 2005, the KFAN name was dropped and the restaurant became known as the Big City Tavern. In July 2006, Big City Tavern closed. The restaurant was taken over by Major's Sports Cafe in September 2006, then changed owners again in 2008 to the Roseville location of Grumpy's Bar & Grill.

== KFXN (690 AM) ==
KFXN, also known as "Score 690", was KFAN's sister station and aired a complementary sports talk format from 1998 until September 2011. Prior to being donated to the Minority Media and Telecommunications Council, the station aired mostly syndicated shows from Fox Sports and ESPN Radio, in addition to the Dan Patrick Show and the Jim Rome Show. For a time, KFXN also aired repeats of KFAN's local shows.

With the divestiture and format change of KFXN, Clear Channel moved the sports format of "The Score" to the HD2 subchannel of KQQL, with plans to eventually air it on translator K278BP (103.5 FM).

== The FAN Radio Network ==
Location	Call sign	Frequency (kHz)	Owner
Bemidji, Minnesota	KBUN-FM	104.5 FM	Hubbard Broadcasting
Bismarck-Mandan	KXMR	710 AM	iHeartMedia
Brainerd, Minnesota	KLIZ	1380 AM, 105.1 FM	Hubbard Broadcasting
Duluth-Superior (MN-WI)	WEBC	560 AM, 106.5 FM	Townsquare Media
Eau Claire, Wisconsin	WBIZ	1400 AM, 98.7 FM	iHeartMedia
Fargo-Moorhead (ND-MN)	KNFL	740 AM, 107.3 FM	Midwest Communications
Grand Forks (ND-MN)	KKXL	1440 AM	iHeartMedia
Mankato, Minnesota	KFSP	1230 AM, 103.1 FM, 106.3 FM	Linder Radio Group
Marshall, Minnesota	KNSG	107.5 FM	Linder Radio Group
Minneapolis-St. Paul (MN-WI)	KFXN-FM	100.3 FM	iHeartMedia
Owatonna, Minnesota	KFOW	1170 AM, 106.3 FM	Linder Radio Group
Rochester, Minnesota	KFAN	1270 AM, 93.5 FM	iHeartMedia
St. Cloud, Minnesota	KXSS	1390 AM, 93.9 FM	Townsquare Media
Worthington, Minnesota	KWOA	730 AM, 100.3 FM	Absolute Communications
Winona, Minnesota	KWMN	99.3 FM	Leighton Broadcasting

== HD Radio ==
By February 2005, the station was one of a handful of stations in Minnesota to use iBiquity's HD Radio system for digital radio broadcasts. On April 25, 2006, Clear Channel announced that KTLK's HD2 subchannel will carry a format focusing on classic country hits from their Format Lab. In August 2009, the format was changed to classic rock.

On August 22, 2010, the HD2 channel began instead carrying the audio of KFAN (1130), mainly in order to allow KFAN's signal to be relayed to K279AZ, an analog translator station at 103.7 FM atop the IDS Center. The station later moved to 103.5 as K278BP.

KFXN-FM's HD3 sub channel carried EMF's K-Love contemporary Christian format, rebroadcasting on K260BA 99.9 FM. That format and translator moved to KTCZ-HD2 which resulted in the HD3 sub channel getting turned off.
