= KTCZ-FM =

Coordinates: 45.058278°N 93.124361°W

- Minneapolis, Minnesota; United States
- Broadcast area: Minneapolis–Saint Paul
- Frequency: 97.1 MHz (HD Radio)
- Branding: Cities 97.1

Programming
- Language: English
- Format: Modern adult contemporary
- Subchannels: HD2: TikTok Radio

Ownership
- Owner: iHeartMedia, Inc.; (iHM Licenses, LLC)
- Sister stations: KDWB-FM; KEEY-FM; KFXN-FM; KQQL; KTLK

History
- First air date: December 27, 1946
- Former call signs: WTCN-FM (1946–1954); KWFM (1954–1969); KTCR-FM (1969–1984)
- Call sign meaning: Twin Cities

Technical information
- Licensing authority: FCC
- Facility ID: 10142
- Class: C
- ERP: 100,000 watts
- HAAT: 315 m (1,033 ft)

Links
- Public license information: Public file; LMS
- Webcast: Listen live (via iHeartRadio)
- Website: cities971.iheart.com

KTCZ-FM (97.1 MHz) is a commercial radio station licensed to serve Minneapolis, Minnesota. KTCZ airs a hybrid modern adult contemporary radio format. The station is owned and operated by iHeartMedia, and has studios and offices on Utica Avenue South in St. Louis Park.

KTCZ's transmitter is located on the KMSP Tower located at 550 Gramsie Road near Interstate 694 in Shoreview. KTCZ broadcasts in the HD Radio hybrid format, its HD2 subchannel carries iHeartRadio's "TikTok Radio" service.

KTCZ has an auxiliary transmitter with an effective radiated power (ERP) of 40,000 watts located at the IDS Center in Downtown Minneapolis.

== History ==
=== WTCN-FM ===
The 97.1 frequency was home to one of the first FM stations in the Twin Cities, signing on the air in December 27, 1946, as WTCN-FM. It was co-owned with WTCN (now WWTC), one of the oldest radio stations in Minneapolis-St. Paul, having signed on the air in 1925.

In 1949, WTCN-TV was launched on channel 4 with studios at Radio City Theater at 9th Street and LaSalle Avenue in downtown Minneapolis. WTCN's radio studios moved to the TV facility in September 1949, with WTCN-FM joining them by February 1950. All three stations were sold in 1952. The TV station was spun off to a new company, Midwest Radio and Television, which also purchased a majority share of WCCO Radio from CBS that same year. Midwest changed the call letters to match its newly acquired WCCO, while WTCN-TV was sold to the Minnesota Television Service Corporation headed by St. Paul businessman Robert Butler, a former ambassador to Cuba and Australia. Butler's company quickly applied for a new TV license on channel 11, but had to negotiate for the frequency with the owner of WMIN, who also applied for the channel. The two stations, WTCN and WMIN, arranged to share the TV broadcast day, alternating every two hours. This became the area's third TV station on September 1, 1953. The WTCN call sign remained with it until 1985, when it became WUSA.

=== KWFM and KTCR-FM ===
WTCN-FM became KWFM in 1954. Al Tedesco purchased KWFM in 1968, mating it with daytimer KTCR. As a result of the sale, the FM station became KTCR-FM. Tedesco and his two brothers were inducted into the Pavek Museum of Radio Hall of Fame in 2005.

In the early 1980s, KTCR-FM was a struggling country music station, and was up against aggressive competition during this time, most notably from KEEY-FM.

=== KTCZ ===
On February 8, 1984, after Tedesco decided to sell his stations to John and Kathleen Parker, KTCR-FM dropped the country format and became KTCZ, "Cities 97" with a mix of progressive rock, alternative rock, jazz and new-age music, an approach similar to stations such as WXRT in Chicago and KBCO in Denver. KTCZ's other influences reach back even further, to progressive FM rock stations from the 1960s and 1970s, particularly the freeform days of KQRS-FM.

In the 1980s, the term "adult album alternative" or AAA did not exist. It was a relatively eclectic format, different from any other rock station in the Twin Cities, designed for female as well as male listeners. Over time, the jazz and new-age was dropped, and the station went through a few different phases, at various points leaning more toward classic rock or alternative rock.

Parker Communications sold the station in 1994 to Chancellor Broadcasting. In 2000, Chancellor was merged into Clear Channel Communications. In 2014, Clear Channel was renamed as iHeartMedia, Inc.

The station's original studios and transmitter were located at 38th Street and Minnehaha Avenue in south Minneapolis from at least the mid-1950s until 1985. The tower was short for a full-power FM station, at a height above average terrain (HAAT) of approximately 150 feet. In 1985, the transmitter was moved to the site of co-owned KTCJ (AM) in New Hope, where it was positioned on one of the three AM towers. Later, KTCZ's transmitter was moved to the KMSP-TV tower in Shoreview, from where most of the other Twin Cities FM stations transmit. KMWA now uses the New Hope tower.

In 2012, the station dropped its longtime "Quality Music from Then and Now" positioner in favor of "Discover New Music", as the format evolved into modern adult contemporary.

On August 20, 2018, at 12 pm, after promoting a "major announcement" through the prior weekend, the station rebranded slightly to "Cities 97.1", re-adjusting its format to play more songs from its longtime adult album alternative format, adding music from artists like Leon Bridges and Amy Shark, and reducing the number of hot AC recurrents. With the changes, KTCZ introduced a new slogan, "Uniquely Twin Cities". The first song under the adjusted format was "Beautiful Day" by U2.

On February 4, 2019, KTCZ-FM announced its new morning show featuring Hunter Quinn and Mollie Kendrick. Quinn was formerly with Seattle country station KNUC, while Kendrick was promoted from her evening air shift at KTCZ. At the same time, interim morning host Paul Fletcher would return to afternoons. The morning show had been without a permanent host since Keri Noble's exit in November 2018.

== HD Radio ==
=== HD2 ===
On April 25, 2006, Clear Channel Communications announced that KTCZ's HD2 subchannel would broadcast "Studio HD," featuring original acoustic rock and chill music. On December 23, 2012, KTCZ-HD2 changed its format to sports radio, branded as "The Score." By Autumn of 2013, "The Score" was replaced by a simulcast of the "New Music" specialty channel found on the IHeartRadio online/mobile platform.

In June 2014, following the flip of co-owned KQQL's HD2 channel, KTCZ-FM-HD2 adopted their 1980s music format, branded as "Kool 1-0-80s." It later switched to the Educational Media Foundation's "Air 1" Christian rock format. At first, Air 1 was simulcast on FM translator W225AP at 92.9 FM in St. Paul. It later added two other translators, K221ES (92.1 FM) and K249ED (97.7 FM), both in Albertville.

=== HD3 ===
On June 5, 2015, KTCZ-FM-HD3 launched a classic hip hop format, branded as "Hot 102.5." The HD3 subchannel feeds translator K273BH at 102.5 MHz. The format shifted to urban contemporary on February 12, 2018.

== Studio C ==
Studio C is a room located at the radio station, with equipment used to record bands and singers, as well as chairs to accommodate a small audience. Many acts who come to the Twin Cities are invited to Studio C to play a few songs and have some brief fan interactions.

From 1989 to 2018, KTCZ each holiday season would release an album, cassette tape and/or CD, known as the Cities 97 Sampler. Proceeds would benefit Minnesota charities. Most of the Cities 97 Sampler tracks were recorded in Studio C in front of a small audience, with the remaining tracks recorded live at local clubs in and around the Twin Cities. Some recordings that did not make the cut for the Cities 97 Sampler can be found on the KTCZ webpage.
