= KMNV =

Regional Mexican radio station in the Minneapolis–St. Paul metropolitan area

Coordinates: 44.95797°N 93.206767°W

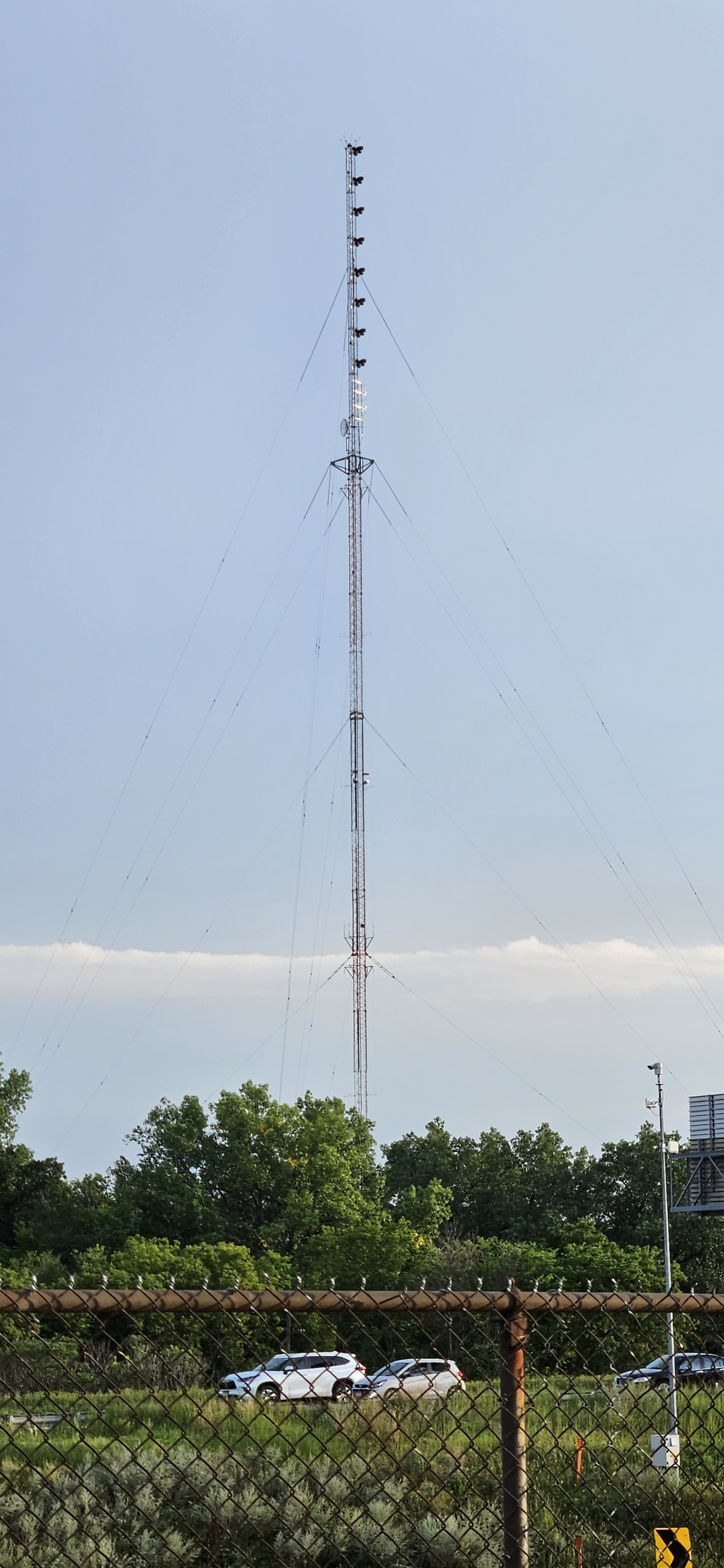
- KMNV's tower near Interstate 94 in St. Paul
- St. Paul, Minnesota; United States
- Broadcast area: Minneapolis-St. Paul
- Frequency: 1400 kHz
- Branding: La Raza

Programming
- Language: Spanish
- Format: Regional Mexican

Ownership
- Owner: Maya Santamaria; (Santamaria Broadcasting, Inc.)
- Sister stations: KMNQ

History
- First air date: 1936
- Former call signs: WMIN (1936–1954); WMNS (1954); WMIN (1954–1962); KTWN (1962–1963); WMIN (1963–1972); KEEY (1972–1982); KLBB (1982–2005)

Technical information
- Licensing authority: FCC
- Facility ID: 99
- Class: C
- Power: 1,000 watts
- Translator: 95.7 K239CJ (St. Paul)

Links
- Public license information: Public file; LMS
- Webcast: Listen live
- Website: laraza1400.com

KMNV (1400 kHz "La Raza") is a commercial AM radio station licensed to St. Paul, Minnesota, and serving the Twin Cities radio market. It is owned by Santamaria Broadcasting and broadcasts a Spanish-language radio format featuring Regional Mexican music with some weekday comedy shows. KMNV's radio studios and offices are in Richfield.

KMNV is powered at 1,000 watts non-directional. The transmitter is near the Mississippi River in St. Paul. Programming is also heard on FM translator K239CJ at 95.7 MHz in St. Paul.

== History ==
=== WMIN ===
The station signed on the air in the summer of 1936, when St. Paul furniture retailer Edward Hoffman began broadcasting at 1370 kHz. WMIN was reassigned to the 1400 kHz frequency in 1941 when the North American Regional Broadcasting Agreement treaty (NARBA) was negotiated to reduce interference between American radio stations and those from other countries. Noted jazz announcer Leigh Kamman started his career in broadcasting at the station around this time.

For many years, the station's transmitter and single tower have enjoyed an enviable location in the center of the metro area. Since at least the late 1970s/early 1980s, the station's technical plant has been located within a block of the city limits separating Minneapolis and St. Paul just east of the Mississippi River at 611 West Frontenac Place in St. Paul. It is plainly visible to travelers on Interstate Highway 94. The studios, at least in the 1970s and 1980s, were also located at this address.

=== Moving into FM, TV ===
WMIN set up a sister station, WMIN-FM at 99.5 MHz in 1945, which operated until being purchased by the owners of AM station WLOL and took the WLOL-FM call letters in 1956. WMIN eventually signed on another FM sister station, at 102.1 MHz.

In addition to FM, WMIN went into television, applying for a TV license in 1952 for Channel 11. WTCN radio had also applied for this frequency, so the stations arranged to divide the broadcast day between them. The television stations soon merged as WTCN-TV, today's KARE.

In 1954, the call sign for 1400 AM briefly changed to WMNS, reflecting a change to a full service format of adult popular music, news and sports. The format remained, but the station returned to being WMIN later that year. As WDGY, WLOL and KDWB enjoyed success playing Top 40 music in the late 1950s, WMIN joined the fray.

In July 1962, WMIN adopted an all-news format, adopting the KTWN call letters the following November. They were changed back to WMIN the following August. In 1967, after playing some country music shows for three years, the station took on the country format full-time.

The station changed its call sign again in 1972 to KEEY, to match that of its FM sister station. KEEY-FM was a popular beautiful music station in the Twin Cities. The AM station would eventually air a beautiful music format identical to its FM counterpart by 1981.

=== KLBB ===
In 1984, the two stations were split up as KEEY-FM became the sister station of WDGY and the AM station struck out on its own. The call letters were changed to KLBB in February 1982, with a staff consisting of many former employees of WCCO Radio. KLBB played adult standards and middle of the road music (MOR) with personality disc jockeys.

Cargill Communications purchased KLBB in 1993, along with KBCW (1470 AM), WTCX-FM (105.1 FM) and WLOL-FM (105.3) for the basis of a proposed alternative rock station, soon to become known as "REV105". The new owners were uncomfortable with dropping the much-loved MOR format of KLBB, so they kept it, updated the music, imaging, promotion and logo of the station, and simulcast KLBB's programming on 1470 AM in Brooklyn Park to improve signal coverage to the north and west. The WLOL call letters (well known in the market from their original homes on 1330 AM and 99.5 FM) were retained by the company and moved from 105.3 FM to 1470.

=== Sale to MPR ===
KLBB, along with WLOL, eventually separated once again from their FM sisters. James and Susan Cargill, who had also acquired a third FM station at 105.7, sold all three of the FM stations that made up REV105 to ABC Radio, owners of KQRS-FM and KEGE. In 1999, the Cargills donated both KLBB and WLOL (soon to be renamed KLBP) to Minnesota Public Radio, where the two frequencies became part of the for-profit Minnesota News Network (MNN). The stations continued the adult standards/MOR format. In 2004, MPR sold off MNN and the statewide network's flagship AM station, WMNN, but retained KLBB and KLBP for the time being.

By now, the "Club 14" simulcast was carrying a mix of local personalities and the "Music Of Your Life" radio network. The two stations were operated as The KLBB Company, a for-profit subsidiary of the Greenspring Company, which, like MPR, were under the umbrella of the American Public Media Group.

=== KLBB sold again, becomes KMNV ===
MPR announced on May 25, 2005, that it had reached an agreement to sell both KLBB and KLBP to Davidson Media Group, a New York City-based broadcaster specializing in multi-cultural, community focused formats. Thereafter, KLBB flipped to a Spanish-language format, while the format on KLBP remained MOR until July 17, 2006, when it switched to an urban gospel sound with the KZTG (later KRJJ) call letters. The sale of both stations was approved by the FCC on July 25, 2005, with Davidson taking control on September 7.

KLBB finally transitioned to its long-promised Spanish-language format on November 4, 2005, leaving the adult standards/big band format on sister station KLBP and bringing to an end the long-time Club 14 simulcast. The KMNV call letters were introduced to AM 1400 on December 16, 2005, just months after its switch to Regional Mexican, while the KLBB call letters moved to sister station AM 1470. The station also airs Spanish language broadcasts of the Minnesota Twins baseball team.

Davidson Media sold KMNV and sister station KMNQ to Santamaria Broadcasting, Inc. effective May 5, 2016, at a purchase price of $1.2 million. KMNV and KMNQ added an FM translator on 95.7 FM in early 2017. It broadcasts from the KMNV tower. For a while, the station split its programming from KMNQ. KMNQ went on to broadcast a variety format with no imaging, before going off air for nearly a year. KMNQ returned to simulcasting KMNV when it returned to air.

=== Whereabouts of former callsigns ===
Following 1470's switch to gospel music, the KLBB call letters and much of its programming were picked up by Stillwater-based WMGT (1220 AM) on July 25, 2006.

The former WMIN call sign was located for many years at 1030 AM, then at 740 AM in the Twin Cities until the call sign was picked up by AM 1010 in Sauk Rapids, Minnesota. KEEY-FM continues with those call letters at 102.1 FM, with a country format.

=== George Floyd protests ===
In 2020, during protests over the murder of George Floyd, the station was knocked off the air on May 27 due to area power outages. During the overnight hours of May 28 to 29, the building it shared with the El Nuevo Rodeo restaurant and other business in a former Odd Fellows Hall at 27th Avenue South and East Lake Street in Minneapolis, was burned down in an arson related to rioting in the area. A week later, it returned to the air with the assistance of KFAI, utilizing its studio facilities.
