= WREY =

Regional Mexican radio station in St. Paul, Minnesota

- Saint Paul, Minnesota; United States
- Broadcast area: Minneapolis-St. Paul
- Frequency: 630 kHz
- Branding: 94.9 El Rey

Programming
- Format: Regional Mexican

Ownership
- Owner: Borgen Broadcasting; (630 Radio, Incorporated)
- Sister stations: WDGY

History
- First air date: 1951; 75 years ago
- Former call signs: WCOW (1951–1957); WISK (1957–1959); KDWB (1959–1991); WDGY (1991–2008)
- Former frequencies: 1590 kHz (1951–1959)
- Call sign meaning: "Rey", Spanish for "king"

Technical information
- Licensing authority: FCC
- Facility ID: 41970
- Class: B
- Power: 3,000 watts (day); 2,400 watts (night)
- Transmitter coordinates: 44°52′0.9″N 92°54′2.8″W
- Translator: 94.9 W235CT (St. Paul)

Links
- Public license information: Public file; LMS
- Webcast: Listen live
- Website: elrey949fm.com

WREY (630 kHz, "94.9 El Rey") is a Spanish language AM radio station licensed to Saint Paul, Minnesota (previously licensed to Hudson, Wisconsin from 1997 to 2005). The station's studios are located in the Westside neighborhood in St. Paul. Its transmitter and towers are located in Woodbury, Minnesota, along South Washington County Highway 19. WREY's signal covers the Minneapolis-St. Paul media market.

WREY broadcasts a Regional Mexican music format, at 3,000 watts by day and 2,400 watts at night.

WREY simulcasts on FM translator station W235CT (94.9) St. Paul.

== History ==
The 630 kHz frequency is perhaps best known as the longtime home of KDWB from 1959 until 1986. For almost two decades, KDWB was a heated rival of the original WDGY, located at 1130 kHz. When WDGY dropped its call letters in 1991 to become KFAN, KDWB's owner adopted the abandoned WDGY call sign for 630 kHz, where it remained until 2008.

=== Early history ===
The station signed on in 1951 at 1590 kHz as WCOW, playing country and old-time music. In its early days, WCOW signed on with a cowbell. The station's owners, the Tedesco brothers (Vic, Nick and Al), had previously launched WSHB in Stillwater, Minnesota, and attempted the following year to get into television on channel 17 but financial backing fell through. The channel 17 allocation was later awarded to Twin Cities Public Television in 1965.

=== 63 KDWB ===
WCOW was not very successful, so the station transitioned to a female-oriented format with the call sign WISK in 1957, and the frequency was changed to 630 kHz. the next year. This format was also unsuccessful, so WISK tried a pop/rock format that was also unsuccessful. The station was soon sold to Crowell-Collier Broadcasting Company, which owned KFWB and KEWB in California. The Top 40 format of those stations was used to launch the new KDWB on October 1, 1959, with "Charlie Brown" by The Coasters being the first song played. KDWB quickly became a major competitor to WDGY, which had been playing a pop music format for a few years. With the 630 kHz frequency, KDWB called itself "Channel 63", and the station began its long uninterrupted run as a pop music station.

KDWB also held the distinction of the first radio station ever to be fined by the Federal Communications Commission. In March 1961, six months after a revision to the Communications Act of 1934 granted it such power, the agency assessed a $10,000 penalty to the station because of repeated willful violations of nighttime broadcast power restrictions on the AM band.

KDWB and WDGY were fierce rivals throughout the 1960s and 1970s. During the 1970s, the two top 40 stations saw new competition as KSTP and WYOO (U100) picked up the format. In 1976, Fairchild Industries, owner of U100 (which operated as a simulcast at 980 AM and 101.3 FM), decided to divest the stations. KDWB owner Doubleday Broadcasting Co. acquired the FM station. On September 16, 1976, with the sale closed, KDWB signed on its FM simulcast.

Within the next three years, KDWB's Top 40 rivals gradually dropped out of the format: U100 was gone in the sale of its AM/FM combo, WDGY flipped to country music in September 1977, and KSTP began to lean adult top 40 during the late 1970s and slowly evolved into its longtime news/talk format by the early 1980s. By the end of the decade, KDWB was the only Top 40 station in the market.

With the Top 40 competition gone, KDWB-FM split apart from its AM sister in September 1979 and became a pop/rock hybrid as "K101". K101 quickly morphed into "Stereo 101", an album oriented rock station designed to compete with KQRS-FM, which had recently dumped its free-form rock presentation and had adopted a stricter playlist. "Stereo 101" proved to be mildly successful, even topping KQRS in the ratings several times. During the four-year run of Stereo 101, new Top 40 stations began appearing on the FM dial, first with WLOL in December 1981, which quickly became one of the most successful stations in the market, and later an attempt by WCCO-FM, which was not nearly as successful. Both moves crippled 63 KDWB's longtime dominance of the format, since it was at a disadvantage with its limited AM signal compared to the more powerful and clearer FM signals. The massive top three ratings success of WLOL, combined with rapidly falling ratings for AM stations in general, resulted in Stereo 101 ditching album rock in early 1984 and returning KDWB-FM to Top 40 as "KDWB FM 101", this time as the dominant station in the AM/FM combo.

Over the next two years, both stations aired similar formats and continued to simulcast from time to time, until the AM station split off on its own early in May 1986 with an automated syndicated oldies format from Unistar as "K63", meeting with mild success.

=== 630 AM becomes WDGY, goes dark, returns ===
On August 24, 1991, 630 AM picked up the WDGY call letters after 1130 AM abandoned them to become KFAN a few weeks prior. The new WDGY adopted a classic country music format, similar to what had been aired on 1130 kHz throughout the 1980s. Ratings for the country format did not meet expectations, and in September 1992, the station temporarily returned to a simulcast with KDWB. (The legal ID at the top of the hour identified both KDWB and WDGY, and Arbitron listed them as KDWB/WDGY.)

WDGY switched to an adult standards format in March 1993, which gave it a respectable boost in ratings. As Midcontinent Media, then owner of KDWB, was looking to sell WDGY, the owner of WMIN, Borgen Broadcasting, agreed to lease the station through a local marketing agreement (LMA). This did not last long, as Midcontinent decided to sell the property in Woodbury that was home to the station's six-tower array. Hence, on April 18, 1994, with no transmission facility available and demand for AM radio low, 630 kHz went dark. The site then became the State Farm Insurance Companies' regional headquarters.

Borgen bought the silent WDGY in October 1996, and returned the station to the air in January 1997 as a Hudson, Wisconsin-based entity with the same call letters, airing a talk radio format that featured hosts like Don Imus, G. Gordon Liddy and Don and Mike, with oldies music from 6 pm to 6 am. In February 1998, syndicated sports talk replaced oldies during those hours.

=== Radio Rey ===
A group of local Hispanic broadcasters had leased weekend time on WMIN for several years as "Radio Rey". On January 1, 1998, WMIN went full-time Radio Rey, broadcasting from studios in a grocery store on the west side of St. Paul. Radio Rey flipped back and forth between WMIN and WDGY for several years before finally settling on WDGY in July 2001. For most of 2005, WMIN ran a complementary Regional Mexican format, "La Nueva Ley", also programmed by the Radio Rey group.

WDGY eventually secured a transmitter site closer to the heart of the metro area, which allowed it to boost its power and change its city of license back to St. Paul by the end of 2005.

In 2018, the station rebranded slightly to "El Rey 94.9".

=== Call letter change to WREY ===
In August 2008, the WDGY call letters were changed to WREY. Subsequently, sister station WMIN, a True Oldies Channel affiliate at 740 AM, changed its call letters to WDGY.
