= Greenspring Company =

Greenspring Company was the for-profit subsidiary of the non-profit American Public Media Group. Profits gathered from Greenspring were funneled through American Public Media Group in order to help fund Minnesota Public Radio, although Greenspring was taxed before the funds were transferred.

Greenspring owned The Rivertown Trading Company until it was sold to Target Corporation in 1998 for US$ 134 million. In 2004, the company sold the Minnesota News Network (MNN) to Saga Communications, apparently along with station WMNN. Greenspring kept KLBB and KLBP radio, which remained affiliated with MNN. Radio station WMNN was sold to Starboard Broadcasting organization, which programs the Catholic radio network Relevant Radio. In 2005, KLBB and KLBP were sold to Davidson Media Group for US$5.2 million.

In 2013, Greenspring Media Group, publishers of Minnesota Monthly and other publications, was sold to Hour Media.
