= WDGY =

Oldies radio station in Hudson, Wisconsin

Coordinates: 44°58′05″N 92°40′01″W

- Hudson, Wisconsin; United States
- Broadcast area: Minneapolis-St. Paul
- Frequency: 740 kHz
- Branding: WDGY Radio (main); Wee-Gee (secondary)

Programming
- Format: Classic hits/Oldies

Ownership
- Owner: WRPX, inc
- Sister stations: WREY

History
- First air date: December 14, 1983
- Former call signs: WAOZ (1982–1983, CP); WRPX (1983–1993); WMIN (1993–2008)
- Call sign meaning: Dr. George Young (original owner of the original WDGY, now KTLK)

Technical information
- Licensing authority: FCC
- Facility ID: 6440
- Class: D
- Power: 5,000 watts (Daytimer)
- Translators: 92.1 W221BS (St. Paul); 103.7 W279DD (Hudson)
- Repeater: 107.1 KTMY-HD2 (Coon Rapids)

Links
- Public license information: Public file; LMS
- Webcast: Listen Live
- Website: wdgyradio.com

WDGY (740 kHz) is a commercial AM radio station licensed to Hudson, Wisconsin, and serving the Minneapolis–Saint Paul radio market. It is owned by WRPX, inc. and airs a Classic Hits/Oldies radio format. The station's studios and offices are in Lake Elmo, Minnesota, while its transmitter is off Commerce Drive near Interstate 94 in Hudson. This station is unrelated to the original WDGY, which was a popular Top-40 station in the area during the mid- to late 1950s, 1960s and 1970s.

Because AM 740 is a Canadian clear channel frequency, WDGY is a daytime-only station. It must sign-off at sunset to prevent interfering with Class A CFZM in Toronto. WDGY can be heard around the clock on two FM translator stations: 92.1 W221BS from St. Paul and 103.7 W279DD (250 watts) from Hudson. The station can also be heard on 107.1 KTMY's HD2 channel in the Twin Cities.

== History ==
=== The original WDGY ===
WDGY was founded in 1923 by Dr. George Young, an optometrist who dabbled in radio as a hobby, and was one of the first radio stations in the Twin Cities area. The original call sign was KFMT, broadcasting at 1300 kHz. The following year, the station moved to 1140 kHz. After several call letter changes, including WHAT and WGWY, Young settled on WDGY, which was based on his name. The WDGY call letters lasted from 1925 until 1991, first at 1140 kHz, then to its longtime home at 1130 kHz beginning in 1941. Following Young's death in 1945, the station was sold by his estate.

WDGY went through several ownership changes until 1956, when it was purchased by Todd Storz' Storz Broadcasting, an Omaha-based owner of a five-to-seven-station group (the maximum number allowed at the time). Storz quickly changed the format to Top-40, taking advantage of the early rise of rock and roll music. The station was nicknamed "WeeGee," the phonetic pronunciation of the call sign, and its format was near the top of the ratings for several years.

In 1959, WDGY gained a formidable challenger when KDWB launched. The two competitors seesawed back and forth in ratings supremacy for area teen and young adult audiences throughout the 1960s and 1970s. The competition, sometimes friendly, sometimes not, resulted in memorable merchandising promotions and concerts.

Generally, WDGY came in second in overall audience ratings to market-dominant, clear-channel WCCO. WDGY seemed to appeal to the 18–35 age demographic while KDWB held a fair share of the teen audience, considered a hot property during this period.

WDGY's longtime Top 40 format came to an end at 3 p.m. on September 2, 1977. Faced with stronger competition on the FM dial, WDGY adopted a country music format, which continued well into the 1980s. In 1990, WDGY would flip to a news/talk format, which would evolve to sports talk as KFAN the next year. Ironically, the abandoned WDGY call letters were quickly picked up by WDGY's former rival station at 630 kHz.

=== History of 740 AM ===
The original call sign for the station's construction permit was WAOZ, but the station was never on the air with those call letters. 740 AM began broadcasting as WRPX, featuring a locally-based MOR/adult contemporary format targeting the Hudson/St. Croix Valley area on December 14, 1983.

After a brief shutdown in 1993 due to business failure and the sale of the station, the vacated WMIN call sign was acquired, which had a long history in the market. WMIN aired a pop music Spanish-language format as "La Nueva Ley" until November 14, 2005. It also aired sports talk at various times as well as leasing time to two groups that eventually acquired their own full-time frequencies: "Straight Talk Radio" (later on 950 KTNF) and "Relevant Radio" (later on 1330 WLOL).

In 2008, the station became WDGY after sister station 630 AM switched to Regional Mexican music, using the call letters WREY.

The WMIN call sign was used from 1936 until 1972 by the predecessor to today's 1400 KMNV and from 1972 to 1993 at 1010 and 1030; the call sign was also briefly used for a shared-time television station on channel 11 that was launched by the original WMIN Radio.

In 2014, the station began broadcasting in HD.

In May 2016, WDGY began simulcasting on FM translator W279DD 103.7 in Hudson, Wisconsin. In February 2017, WDGY added another FM translator, W221BS 92.1, broadcasting from an antenna atop Wells Fargo Place in Downtown St. Paul.

On March 7, 2017, WDGY discontinued broadcasting in HD and began broadcasting in C-QUAM AM stereo. Due to the re-heightened awareness of HD broadcasting on AM surrounding the October 27, 2020 FCC vote to approve voluntary all-digital broadcasting by AM stations, WDGY resumed an HD Radio signal on November 17, 2020.

On October 30, 2021, WDGY once again discontinued broadcasting in HD Radio. Unlike in 2017, AM stereo did not return.

At the start of October of 2024, 740 WDGY began signing on early at reduced power with a pre-sunrise authorization (PSRA). On the evening of December 2nd, 2024, 740 WDGY began to remain on the air for an additional two hours past the traditional sunset time, at reduced power, thanks to a post-sunset authorization (PSSA). Since October of 2024, 740 WDGY broadcasts using HD Radio only while operating at reduced power during PSRA and PSSA times. Due to reduced power and skywave interference, the digital HD signal will likely only be reliable in and around the Hudson, WI area. During daytime hours, 740 WDGY discontinues to broadcast in HD, switching to full analog mode.

WDGY at one time carried "The True Oldies Channel" programmed by New York City DJ Scott Shannon. It currently programs its oldies format in-house and uses local hosts.
