= Jim Paschke =

American sportscaster (born 1950)

- Born: James Paschke; November 21, 1950 (age 75); Rochester, Minnesota, U.S.
- Education: University of Minnesota; Brown Institute
- Occupation: Sportscaster
- Years active: 1973–2021

Jim Paschke (born November 21, 1950) is an American retired sportscaster. Paschke has handled play-by-play duties for a wide array of sports at all levels, but is most recognized for his work as the Milwaukee Brewers television announcer (1987–1991, 1995–1996), Big Ten football announcer, and was most recently the television voice of the Milwaukee Bucks (1986–2021).

A native of Rochester, Minnesota, Paschke began his broadcasting career in radio in Knoxville, Iowa, after attending the University of Minnesota and graduating from Brown Institute, in Minneapolis.

On April 15, 1987, television viewers and Milwaukee Brewers fans heard Paschke call the first no-hitter in franchise history.

In October 2007, Paschke was inducted into the Wisconsin Basketball Coaches Association Hall of Fame as a "Friend of Basketball." He is an eight-time Chicago/Midwest regional Emmy Award winner. In 2013 Paschke was inducted into the National Academy of Television Arts and Sciences’ prestigious Silver Circle, an honor given to outstanding individuals who have devoted 25 years or more to the local television industry. Paschke was also inducted into the Milwaukee Press Club's Milwaukee Media Hall of Fame in 2014.

In 2018, Paschke was named recipient of the NBA's Todd Harris Spirit Award.

Paschke was the author of Paschketball, a video blog featured on the Milwaukee Bucks' website. "Paschketball" was coined by a young Bucks fan, Matt Gritzmacher.

While he didn't rely on stock signature calls for plays, Paschke was known for saying sometimes when the home crowd was roaring even louder, especially after a big win, "This place is up for grabs!"

In May 2021, Paschke announced his retirement from sportscasting at the conclusion of the 2020-21 NBA season. Paschke cited that the reason he was retiring was so he could spend more time with his family.

Paschke's last game as an announcer was game 4 of the Eastern Conference first-round, between the Bucks and the Miami Heat, on May 29, 2021. The Bucks won 120–103, sweeping the Heat and advancing to the conference semi-finals. The Bucks went on to win the NBA championship, defeating the Phoenix Suns in the 2021 NBA Finals, winning their first NBA championship since 1971. Paschke was unable to attend the Bucks' Finals-clinching win and the victory parade two days later, after testing positive for COVID-19. Bucks superstar Giannis Antetokounmpo honored Paschke's absence in the post-game press conference by wearing a special "Paschketball" t-shirt.

Paschke returned to Fiserv Forum as the pregame ceremony host for the Bucks' 2021 season opener, which included presentation of the Bucks' championship rings and championship banner. When Giannis Antetokounmpo was presented with his ring, Paschke took off his sport coat, revealing a t-shirt similar to the "Paschketball" shirt that Antetokounmpo wore after the Bucks won the NBA Championship, only with Giannis' face on it, instead of Paschke's.
