= WTCN =

WTCN may refer to:

- WTCN-CD, a low-power television station (channel 17, virtual 43) licensed to Palm Beach, Florida, United States
- KLBB (AM), a defunct radio station (1220 AM) formerly licensed to serve Stillwater, Minnesota, United States, which held the call sign WTCN from 1985 to 1993
- WWTC, a radio station (1280 AM) licensed to Minneapolis, Minnesota, United States, which held the call sign WTCN from September 1934 to October 1964
- KTCZ, a radio station (97.1 FM) licensed to Minneapolis, Minnesota, United States, which held the call sign WTCN-FM from 1947 to 1954.
- KARE, a television station (channel 11 virtual/11 digital) licensed to Minneapolis, Minnesota, United States, which held the call sign WTCN-TV from September 1953 to July 1985
- WCCO-TV, a television station (channel 4 virtual/32 digital) licensed to Minneapolis, Minnesota, United States, which held the call sign WTCN-TV from July 1949 to August 1952
