= Brown College (Minnesota) =

For-profit career college with campuses in Minnesota

Sanford-Brown College
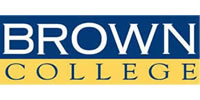
- Type: Private for-profit college
- Active: 1946–2017
- Location: Mendota Heights and Brooklyn Center, Minnesota, United States; 44°51′54″N 93°9′48″W
- Campus: Urban
- Website: www.browncollege.edu

Brown College was a private for-profit college in Mendota Heights, Minnesota. It merged with another college in March 2014, to form Sanford-Brown College. These campuses were part of a larger group of schools under the same general heading. Generally each campus was separately administered, although the two in Minnesota, under the heading of "Brown College", were under the same president (later director). Like the rest of this system, Brown College was a for-profit school and a subsidiary of Career Education Corporation. The college offered programs in the areas of Broadcasting, Game Design, Visual Communications, Network, Business Management, Medical Assisting, and Criminal Justice. The school ran on 5 week modules continuously throughout the year, with week breaks in July and December.

In May 2015 Career Education Corporation announced the closure of all remaining Sanford–Brown schools.

== History ==
The school was originally established in 1946 as the American Institute of the Air by Richard and Helen Brown. The college originally occupied a seven-building campus on East Lake Street in Minneapolis, Minnesota. The initial campus was made up of old business buildings that were remodeled and refurbished. In 1954, the school changed its name to Brown Institute and then in 2001, it became Brown College. Richard and Helen retired in 1978 but were active participants in Brown events until their deaths in 1994.

In July 1986, due to enrollment increases and the lack of space that resulted, the school moved to a brand new facility on Lake Street and Hiawatha Avenue in Minneapolis. In 1997, it relocated again to a Mendota Heights, again due to space needs. Brown College further expanded in October 2001 when it opened its Brooklyn Center, a second campus in a suburb of the northwestern Twin Cities.

In April 2003, Career Education Corporation canceled the Electronics Technology program at Brown College. Electronics was one of the first programs established after the Broadcasting program, and was one of the programs that built Brown's reputation nationwide.

Career Education Corporation formed a partnership with Le Cordon Bleu, Paris, in January 1999. Brown was the first college in North America to include a Le Cordon Bleu Culinary Program. February 2005, Le Cordon Bleu began operating as a separate entity.

As of December 2011, the College suspended taking new students in Game Design & Development.

Sanford-Brown's Mendota Heights campus closed in January, 2017. In April of that year the final students finished their programs at the Brooklyn Center campus and the building was emptied.

== Accreditation ==
Brown College was nationally accredited by the Accrediting Commission of Career Schools and Colleges of Technology (ACCSCT) and (see ACICS), which accredits for-profit schools. Brown College did not have regional accreditation. Thus, many regionally accredited schools did not accept their credits for transfer to undergraduate courses or recognize their degrees for entry into graduate programs.

== Academics ==
Brown College had three schools offering Bachelor’s and associate degrees in the following areas:

- School of Broadcasting – Communication Studies Program, Radio Broadcasting Program and Television Production Program
- School of Design – Digital Photography, Interior Design, Visual communications Program, Graphic Design Program and Multimedia Program
- School of Technology – Game Design & Development Program, Information Technology Program and Network Development Program and Software Development Program
- Business Management – Business Management Program
- Criminal Justice – Criminal Justice Program

== Campuses ==
Brown College was located in Mendota Heights, Minnesota, with a separate autonomous campus in Brooklyn Center. In August 2011, Brown moved its Mendota Heights campus across the street into a new site. This was a single one-level modern building with new equipment. Earlier in the year a very similar structure was constructed for the Brooklyn Center site.

Brown College had a radio station named the Voice of Brown College or simply known as the VBC. Students in their 5th quarter operated the studio during the mornings, and voicetrack shows were broadcast later in the day.

== Notable alumni ==
- Tom Barnard- radio personality/host of the 92 KQRS Morning Show (Radio Broadcasting)
- Chuck Brown - Minnesota politician and former member of the Minnesota House of Representatives (Radio Broadcasting)
- Jeff Dubay- radio/television personality (Radio Broadcasting) Former KFAN PA
- Rod Grams - U.S. Senator from Minnesota (Radio Broadcasting)
- Steve Gunderson - U.S. Congressman from Wisconsin (Radio Broadcasting)
- Chuck Hagel - 24th U.S. Secretary of Defense and former U.S. Senator from Nebraska (Radio Broadcasting)
- Andy Jorgensen - Wisconsin politician and member of the Wisconsin State Assembly (Radio Broadcasting)
- Robin Kreibich - radio/television personality and former member of the Wisconsin State Assembly (Radio/TV Broadcasting)
- John Kriesel - Member of the Minnesota House of Representatives (Radio Broadcasting)
- Bree Walker - radio/television personality (Radio Broadcasting)
- Jeremy Borash - Professional wrestling personality and WWE producer
- Orion Samuelson – "the Elvis Presley of agricultural radio"
