= Jeff Dubay =

American radio personality

Jeffrey Dubay (born January 19, 1968) is a former American radio personality. He was co-host of the PA and Dubay Show on KFAN, a sports talk radio station broadcasting to the Minneapolis-St. Paul markets, and co-hosted The Judd and Dubay sports talk show on ESPN.

== Career ==
Dubay, nicknamed "Puffy", spent 10 years as co-host of the PA and Dubay show which aired weekday mornings on KFAN.

He was also a co-host on Vikings Fan Line with former Minnesota Vikings player Mike Morris, and covered Minnesota Gophers hockey games for Fox Sports Net.

Dubay is also a former employee of the Minnesota Twins. He served with the team from 1986-1992. Dubay was quoted in a Sports Illustrated column about Kirby Puckett discussing team members cheating on their wives on the road. Because of these comments, his friendship with Puckett and other former Twins was severely damaged

Dubay is a graduate of Brown College. Shortly after his arrest, Dubay's picture was removed from the Brown College Broadcasting Wall of Fame.

In January, 2013, Dubay was hired to co-host the Judd and Dubay show on 1500 ESPN radio. He was let go the following January after one year in a cost cutting measure.

On February 18, 2014, it was announced via the Tom Barnard Show that Dubay would launch his own podcast show to be part of the planned Tom Barnard podcast network.

On March 19, 2014, Dubay was fired by Sean Barnard, the general manager of the Tom Barnard podcast. Dubay said on his Facebook page that Sean wanted him to take a drug test, but that he refused to.

On September 15, 2014, Dubay's podcast project, aptly titled "The Jeff Dubay Show" aired and was podcastable online. The 60 minute podcast, which featured Dubay and his producer/sidekick Jason McGovern, had a similar formula to all of Dubay's other shows. The show was not regulated by the FCC and carried an explicit disclaimer.

On September 20, 2015, Dubay returned to a podcast format with the Purple Bierstube Rube Report, a Minnesota Vikings postgame show. Dubay mentioned during the first podcast that the show is done sponsor-free, donations are accepted and ten percent of all donations go towards various drug and alcohol treatment facilities throughout the Twin Cities metro area.

On February 20, 2017, Dubay announced via Twitter that he had a new show called "The Mix" on KRWC 1360 AM. The show is no longer on the air.

== Personal troubles ==
On October 15, 2008, Dubay was arrested in Maplewood for felony possession of a controlled substance. The arrest booking documents state the initial charge was, "Felony Possession Controlled Substance [F-NARCOTICS][35]" and further references, "Statute Referenced Drugs - Sale More Than 2 Packages or Greater Than 6 Grams Methamphetamine Precursor Drugs". According to the county jail's website, Dubay was released without being charged, pending further investigation. After the arrest he was placed on leave from KFAN and Gopher Hockey duties on Fox Sports. He was later charged with crack cocaine possession

On October 24, 2008, KFAN terminated Dubay. All references to him on the station's website were subsequently removed.

On January 12, 2010, he was sentenced to six months in jail for failing to abide by the terms of his probation. According to the court, he failed a number of drug tests.

On July 11, 2012, Dubay did his first public interview since his drug abuse problems, he appeared on the WCCO radio "Chad Hartman show" Dubay claims he has been free from drugs since March 2011 and is now sober

On March 20, 2014, Bob Sansevere, a writer for the Saint Paul Pioneer Press, wrote that Dubay's career in Twin Cities media has probably come to an end.

On April 29, 2015, Dubay was pulled over while driving in Cottage Grove, MN. Dubay was arrested on suspicion of possessing methamphetamine and more than two dozen hypodermic needles. A search turned up two unused hypodermic needles in his pocket and 31 others in the vehicle and a small baggie that contained a trace amount of methamphetamine, according to police.

In December 2017, Dubay pleaded guilty to felony third degree assault of a woman in Cottage Grove.
