= Leigh Kamman =

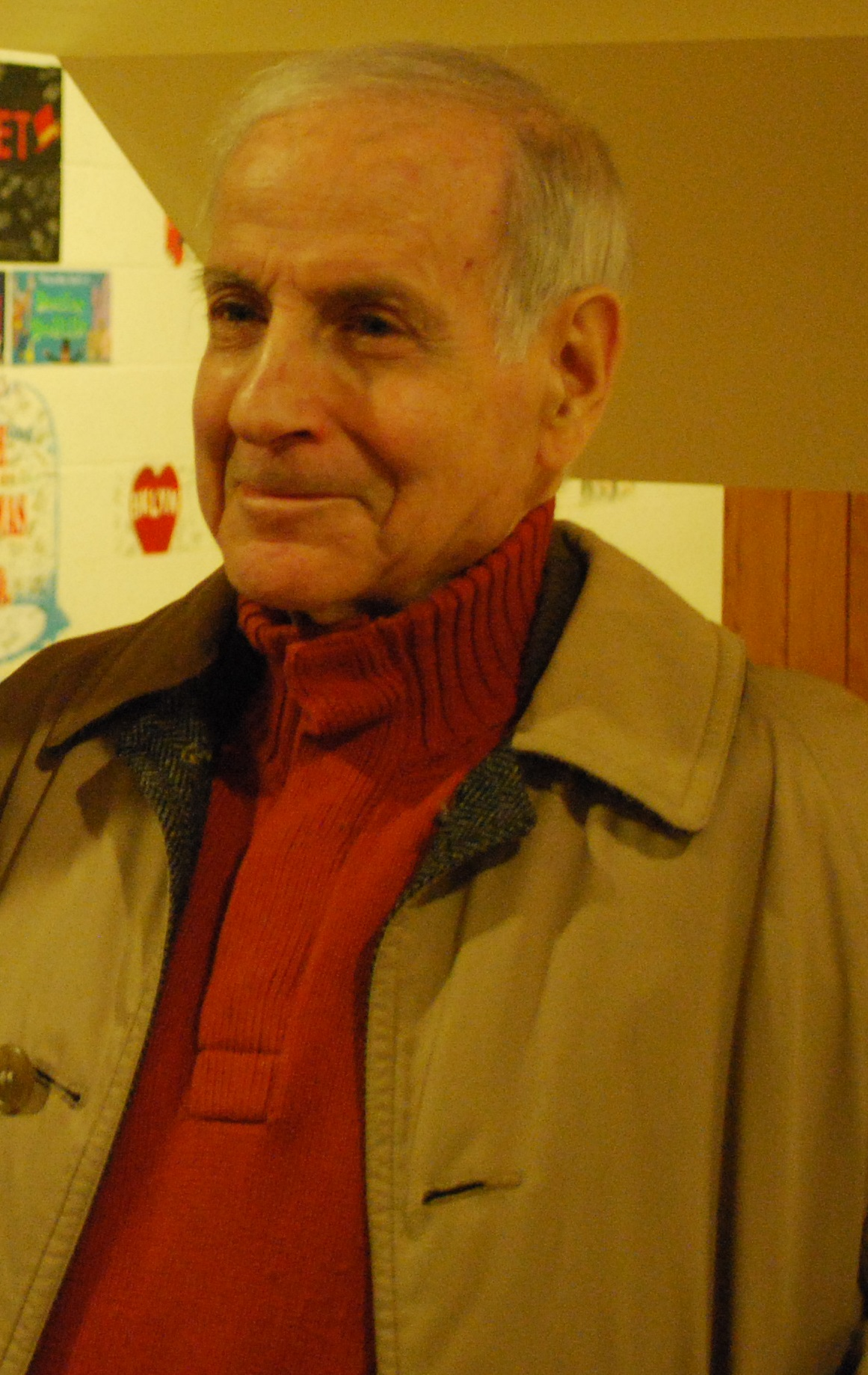
Kamman in 2009

Leigh Kamman (September 2, 1922 – October 17, 2014) was an American radio host who focused on bringing jazz music to the airwaves during his career, which spanned more than six decades.

He began his career in the Twin Cities area of Minnesota, but spent time in other places such as at WOV radio in New York City. On September 29, 2007, he hosted his last edition of The Jazz Image on Minnesota Public Radio, which he had run since 1973. Upon his retirement, he told listeners, "I really want to take time now for some projects that have been waiting, including a book I've long wished to write." Kamman was honored numerous times for his contributions to the region and the promotion of "the only original American art form."

He became intrigued with jazz in the 1930s when he was 12 years old, doing odd jobs at resorts in central Minnesota. His parents and their friends would get together to listen to 78 rpm discs, and Leigh began to appreciate the music. By the end of his teenage years, Kamman was fully in love with the art form. He worked for his school newspaper and found a way to meet Duke Ellington at a train station in Saint Paul when he was 17 years old.

Kamman's first jazz broadcast occurred in 1940 from WMIN radio where he had been working as a custodian. He moved to WEBC in Duluth, Minnesota in 1942, but didn't really become comfortable with the medium of radio until he found work with the U.S. Army during World War II, broadcasting from KOA in Denver, Colorado with shows that were carried on Armed Forces Radio.

Kamman returned to the Twin Cities following the war, going to work at WLOL. He moved on to WOV in New York in 1950, where he interviewed some of the biggest names in jazz from the Palm Cafe in Harlem. He returned to WLOL in 1956 and later was heard over KSTP for many years, along with KQRS-AM/FM (simulcast at the time) until moving on to MPR. The KSTP shows on Sundays would link up with other NBC stations around the country to share the music that was being played in different cities. He died on October 17, 2014, aged 92.

The Leigh Kamman Legacy Project is a 501(c) non-profit organization formed to preserve and share the body of work including audio, visual, and written resources of Leigh Kamman.
