= WMGT =

WMGT may refer to:

- WMGT-TV, a television station (channel 30, virtual 41) licensed to serve Macon, Georgia, United States
- KLBB (AM), a defunct radio station (1220 AM) formerly licensed to serve Stillwater, Minnesota, United States, which held the call sign WMGT from 2003 to 2006
- a defunct television station in Mt. Greylock in Adams, Massachusetts in the 1950s.
