= KRJJ =

KRJJ may refer to:

- KRJJ-LP, a defunct low-power radio station (100.7 FM) formerly licensed to serve Portland, Oregon, United States
- KMNQ, a radio station (1470 AM) licensed to serve Brooklyn Park, Minnesota, United States, which held the call sign KRJJ from 2007 to 2008
