= WGVX =

Adult contemporary radio station in Lakeville, Minnesota

Love 105
- Minneapolis–Saint Paul, Minnesota; United States
- RDS: 105.1/105.3: PI: FFFF; PS: Love 105 Artist Title; RT: Artist - Title; 105.7: PI: 9108; PS: LOVE 105 Artist Title; RT: Artist - Title
- Branding: Love 105

Programming
- Format: Adult contemporary
- Affiliations: Compass Media Networks; Premiere Networks; Westwood One

Ownership
- Owner: Cumulus Media; (Radio License Holdings LLC)
- Sister stations: KQRS-FM, KXXR

Links
- Webcast: Listen live; Listen live (via iHeartRadio)
- Website: love105fm.com
- For technical information, see § Stations.

Love 105 is a trimulcast of three radio stations in Minneapolis–Saint Paul, Minnesota, United States, that feature an adult contemporary format. The trimulcast is composed of: WGVX (105.1 FM), licensed to Lakeville, Minnesota; WLUP (105.3 FM), licensed to Cambridge, Minnesota; and WWWM-FM (105.7 FM), licensed to Eden Prairie, Minnesota. All three stations are owned by Cumulus Media.

The studios and offices are in Southeast Minneapolis in the Como district. WGVX's transmitter is located southeast of Apple Valley, WLUP's transmitter is located in Cambridge, and WWWM-FM's transmitter is located atop the IDS Center in downtown Minneapolis.

== History ==
=== Three signals, one station ===
Prior to their unification as REV105, the three stations were known by other names.

Today's WGVX was first licensed as KZPZ on November 15, 1990. It was officially signed on the air in late 1992 as WTCX by J. Tom Lijewski, who had previously worked at other Twin Cities stations. The station aired a hot AC format targeting the south metro area of the Twin Cities. This was the initial FM station later purchased by Cargill Communications in 1993 to form REV105 a year later, when the call letters were changed to KREV.

WLUP is the oldest of the three stations, having signed on the air June 21, 1973 on 105.5 as KABG, with a Middle of the Road format. The call letters were changed to KXLV in 1983, and in 1991, the station increased its power, which necessitated a move to 105.3. On December 13, 1991, it became the latest of the many frequencies to use the WLOL call letters, after WLOL-FM was purchased by Minnesota Public Radio and the KSJN call letters were moved from 91.1 to 99.5 earlier that year. This longtime AC station became the northern signal of REV105, with the call letters changed to WREV in 1994.

WWWM-FM was first licensed as KOUO on March 26, 1992, to Jack Moore (creator/owner of the former Twin Cities stations WAYL (93.7 FM) and KTWN (107.9 FM)). It signed on as KCFE on March 11, 1993, airing a smooth jazz/adult album alternative format (which resembled the original format of Cities 97 from the 1980s) as "Cafe 105.7". It was modeled largely on Moore's KTWN, from the late 1970s to early 80s. The station carried Don Imus's syndicated morning show for a short time. In October 1996, KCFE was sold to Cargill and briefly became REV105's third transmitter, prior to all three stations being sold to ABC Radio the following March.

=== REV105 ===
REV105, "Revolution Radio," was owned by Cargill Communications, headed by Jim and Susan Cargill, heirs to the massive Cargill company fortune. It broadcast under the call signs KREV, WREV, and later KCFE on three different frequencies (105.1, 105.3 and 105.7). REV105 played a fairly wide variety of music, mostly alternative rock, and put a lot of time into promoting music from local performers. Minnesota has a very active music community, and a number of diverse artists have received national attention (see Music of Minnesota). Area high school students also contributed to some of the programming put on the air, such as the weekly "Rock 'n' Roll Homeroom".

The station's genesis came out of another station. From 1990 to 1992, KJJO (KJ104) was an adventurous modern rock station, and gained a devoted (if small) listening audience. The station switched to country music in 1992, and many held out hope that KJ104's format would resurface soon. Two former KJ104 staffers, Brian Turner and Kevin Cole, actively sought out stations to pick up the format. On several occasions, they were turned down by previous owners of both WTCX and KCFE.

Finally, with financial backing from the Cargills, Turner and Cole found that the owner of WTCX was ready to sell. In 1993, the Cargills purchased WTCX for $2.6 million, along with big band music-formatted KLBB for $1 million and small suburban country music outlet KBCW for $400,000. The plan was to turn the one FM and two AMs into a modern rock radio network, eventually simulcasting programming around the country. Plans eventually changed, and they decided to go with a more local approach (though REV105 did syndicate a show, Spin Radio, for a short time). Soon, the Cargills were able to purchase WLOL (located next to WTCX on the dial, but broadcasting from a location far to the north). Turner, Cole, and the Cargills were reluctant to change the big band music format on KLBB, since it did have a small, if dedicated, following, and decided not only to keep the format, but to simulcast it on their other AM signal, 1470 (105.3's legendary call letters, WLOL, were shifted to 1470). The only other changes made to KLBB was to give it a "hipper" sound, incorporating more lounge music and fresher advertising and imaging. Hence, the foundation of Rev 105 was set, with KREV and WREV soon to come.

The group's intended programming plans were public knowledge at the time and highly publicized. ABC Radio already owned classic rock KQRS-FM and felt the time was right to lay its own claim to the rapidly rising alternative rock format. On February 4, 1994, ABC agreed to purchase KQRS' main rival, KRXX, from Entercom, and KQRS management immediately took control of the station. Within two days, the former 93X became the Twin Cities' newest modern rock station, "93.7 The Edge". In effect, ABC killed two birds with one stone by striking down a rival to KQRS, and warding off a potential new one. This did not change Turner's and Cole's plans at all, as they felt their station would be different enough to compete in the market. Pending Federal Communications Commission (FCC) approval of Cargill's own station deals, WTCX officially went off the air February 7, 1994 (coincidentally, the first full day of The Edge's new format). WLOL followed on April 24. On May 1, REV105's eclectic new alternative rock format took to the air, with the first official song being "Crazy" by Patsy Cline.

REV105 was a unique station. It would not be an ordinary, consultant-programmed modern rock station like "The Edge". Rather, it took many elements from typical modern rock stations, added a heavy amount of new, obscure and local artists, and mixed in other musical styles such as industrial, punk, classic rock, hip-hop, world, dance and techno. According to Cole, when REV started, it would play the newly popular Green Day next to old Who songs, comparing and contrasting two different instances of similar music. In addition, there were a large number of specialty shows, featuring other musical styles like "old school" funk, imports, club mixes and ambient music. REV105 was instrumental in introducing newer artists to the airwaves, such as Ani DiFranco and Soul Coughing. As music critic Jim DeRogatis said, "The brilliance of REV105 was that I would hear a set that would go Bob Marley to Nine Inch Nails to Black Sabbath. And that's how real people listen to music."

The new "Revolution Radio" was a mild success, even with the high-powered competition from "The Edge". In the first full ratings book, it earned a 1.5 overall Arbitron rating, and did even better in the 18-34 age breakdown. Ratings were hampered throughout the station's history by signal reception issues, the eclectic nature of its format, and its limited budget. Signal issues were perhaps its biggest issue, as Rev's ratings were similar or higher than any of its successor stations. The limited transmitter reach of 105.1 and 105.3 were helped when Cargill purchased another neighboring signal, KCFE, in October 1996, which improved its reach in the southwest suburbs and particularly in Minneapolis, where a large number of its listeners resided.

=== Switch to X105 ===
Formats of the 105s
Name	Format	Duration
REV 105	Alternative	1994–1997
X105	Active rock	1997
Zone 105	AAA	1997–1999
Zone 105	Classic alternative	1999–2000
Zone 105	Alternative	2000–2001
V105	Rhythmic oldies	2001–2002
Drive 105	AAA	2002–2004
Drive 105	Alternative	2004–2007
Love 105 FM	Soft AC/Oldies	2007–2012
Love 105 FM	Mainstream AC	2012–2013
105 The Ticket	Sports radio	2013–2015
105 The Vibe	Classic hip hop	2015–2018
Love 105 FM	Soft AC	2018–2025
Love 105 FM	Mainstream AC	2025–present

REV105 enjoyed an almost three-year run, but the end came at noon on March 11, 1997, when the station was purchased by competitor Disney/Capital Cities/ABC, which already owned two powerful 100,000 watt stations in the Twin Cities, KQRS-FM and KEGE ("The Edge"). By 1:15 that afternoon, most of the air staff was fired, and after playing "Hello, Goodbye" by The Beatles, the station was reborn with a hard rock format as "X105", with the three stations receiving the call letters KXXP, KXXU and KXXR. The first song on "X105" was "Rock You Like a Hurricane" by The Scorpions.

This situation became a focal point for critics of the Telecommunications Act of 1996. Fans of REV105 banded together to protest the loss of REV105, and out of this, the group Americans for Radio Diversity was formed. The purchase received fairly widespread news coverage, with articles appearing in Billboard magazine and Rolling Stone, where Soul Coughing frontman Mike Doughty stated, "Having officially walked through every radio station in North America, I can honestly say REV was the only one that had a cause that was righteous."

Many feel that the motivation to purchase REV105 was to eliminate the competition, as ABC obtained the rights to all intellectual property of REV105, including its logos and website, and Cargill reportedly signed a non-compete agreement. The purchase was seen in some ways as a defensive maneuver against other growing radio conglomerates such as Chancellor Broadcasting, which then owned seven radio stations in the Twin Cities (eventually purchased by radio giant Clear Channel Communications in 1999). Of course, Cargill could not compete as a stand-alone owner in this environment and saw this as a perfect opportunity to sell the station. According to Cargill, "As we saw all this consolidation in the market, we just didn't feel we were going to be able to survive."

REV105 was in many ways a successor to the Twin Cities area's original "alternative" station, KJJO (now KZJK), which changed its format in 1992. Kevin Cole, the former program director at REV105, and a veteran of the old KJ104, later resurfaced at KEXP in Seattle. General Manager Brian Turner eventually went back to KTCZ, where he worked in the 1980s, to host its morning show, and later worked at upstart alternative rock station KTWN. In 2005, a few former REV hosts reunited at Minnesota Public Radio for the launch of KCMP, "89.3 The Current", which airs an adult album alternative format loosely inspired by REV105.

=== Zone 105 ===
Soon after the birth of X105, a new hard rock station arrived in the Twin Cities when WBOB dropped country music and switched to a hard rock format with Howard Stern's syndicated morning show. ABC has worked to fight off any potential competitors to its main highly rated station, KQRS-FM. At 2 p.m. on September 18, 1997, KEGE dropped its alternative format and began simulcasting on the 105s as part of a format swap (with KEGE becoming 93X once again). On September 24, after 6 days of simulcasting, the 105s became Zone 105, with an adult alternative format. After a few months, 93X took the KXXR call sign from the former X105, and the three Zone 105 stations became KZNR, KZNT and KZNZ.

After the station became Zone 105, a few of the old REV hosts were brought back. Brian Oake, who had gone over to The Edge, and Mary Lucia hosted the morning show. Lucia also hosted a weekly local music program named Popular Creeps from the local Bryant-Lake Bowl. Creeps won multiple awards for programming quality.

Over time, Zone 105 went in more of a classic alternative direction, but toward the end of its run, leaned more towards alternative rock. None of the post-REV 105 incarnations of these frequencies were true alternative rock, as the frequency had to keep a safe distance between itself and sister station 93X. For this reason, any song with a rock "edge" was discarded by the 105s during this time.

=== V105 ===
On March 8, 2001, at 10 a.m., after so-so ratings as an alternative rock station, Zone 105 became V105, and flipped to rhythmic oldies. The first song as "V105" was "Love Train" by The O'Jays. The call letters were changed to WGVX, WGVY and WGVZ. V105 lasted less than a year before reverting to a revised version of the old "Zone" format as "Drive 105" on January 17, 2002.

=== Drive 105 ===
Drive 105's format was an adult-oriented version of the alternative rock format, and similar in many ways to the previous Zone 105. However, the fact that it was forced to distance themselves from sister station 93X by avoiding harder-edged rock meant that it played a lot of music that has more in common with the AAA format. For the better part of the last several years, the station frequently promoted "This station is not owned or operated by Clear Channel Communications," though the station was actually part of another huge media conglomerate, The Walt Disney Company.

Drive 105, along with sister stations KQRS-FM and KXXR (93X), were often referred to as Disney's "Wall Of Rock". Both 93X and the 105's are programmed with formats designed to fight competition off of Disney's flagship in the market, top-rated KQRS. When WRQC became a rival to KQRS in 1997, the current KXXR switched to a similar format, despite a profitable alternative format already on that frequency. It is widely known in the local market that Disney would go to great lengths to protect its "cash cow".

In fact, Drive 105 was in large part created to ward off competition from KTCZ ("Cities 97"). After the fall of Zone 105 and in the months before Drive 105 was created, Cities 97 made significant gains in the 25-54 age group. Disney saw this as a threat to KQRS and created Drive 105 originally to jab at Cities 97's ratings. To keep a distance from sister 93X, the station targeted an older age group than most alternative stations. Like predecessor Zone 105, Drive would avoid any song that featured a significant amount of guitar distortion. When the station first began in January 2002, it aired messages such as, "Remember when Cities 97 and KS95 sounded different? We do, that's why we're true to the music." This was a stab at Cities 97's old slogan, "true to the music," and a criticism of a recent tweak in the direction of pop-sounding KS95. During its first two years on the air, Drive 105 frequently made cracks at Cities 97. However, this came to an end after criticism from the public and as the station began to take on an identity of its own.

=== Love 105 ===
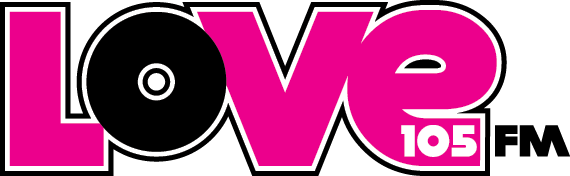
"Love 105" logo (2007–2013)

Ratings-wise, Drive 105, like all of the previous formats, were hampered by the limited signal reach in the Twin Cities area and experienced only moderate success, usually reaching a 1% or 2% overall ratings share. Just before 3:00 p.m. on May 7, 2007, the plug was pulled on the three signals' longest-running incarnation to that point. Drive 105 played its last song, "Say It Ain't So" by Weezer, prior to temporarily switching over to a simulcast of sister station KXXR, in anticipation of a format flip. The flip to the Soft AC/Oldies format with the moniker "Love 105" happened at 5:30 the next morning, with Sonny and Cher's "I Got You Babe" as the new format's debut song.

"Love 105" featured mellow songs by artists including Chicago, Neil Diamond, Barbra Streisand, Sade, Bread, and many others. The playlist also initially included occasional adult standards, from the likes of Frank Sinatra and Bobby Darin, along with some more traditional oldies.

Shortly after the relaunch as Love 105, the station, along with ABC's other non-Radio Disney and ESPN Radio stations, were acquired by Citadel Broadcasting. Citadel merged with Cumulus Media on September 16, 2011.

Citadel Broadcasting would move WGVZ's transmitter from Eden Prairie to the IDS tower in downtown Minneapolis. This significantly improved reception of the station in Minneapolis and western Saint Paul despite the drop in effective radiated power from 5,800 watts to 950 watts.

=== The transition to Mainstream adult contemporary ===
On April 13, 2012, the station transitioned to mainstream adult contemporary, dropping all pre-1970s oldies, and adding current adult contemporary fare to fill the void left by WLTE, when that station flipped to country music the previous December. In November 2012, Love 105 switched to all-Christmas music during the holidays, again filling a void created by the departure of WLTE.

On November 26, WGVY's call letters were changed to WNSH; the call signs of WGVX and WGVZ remained unchanged. The call sign change was temporary, done to "park" the call letters so that they could later be used on FM 94.7 in New York City, which would use the calls to reflect its "Nash FM" country music franchise. On January 29, 2013, the WNSH call letters moved to New York, with the WRXP call letters parked on 105.3.

=== 105 The Ticket ===
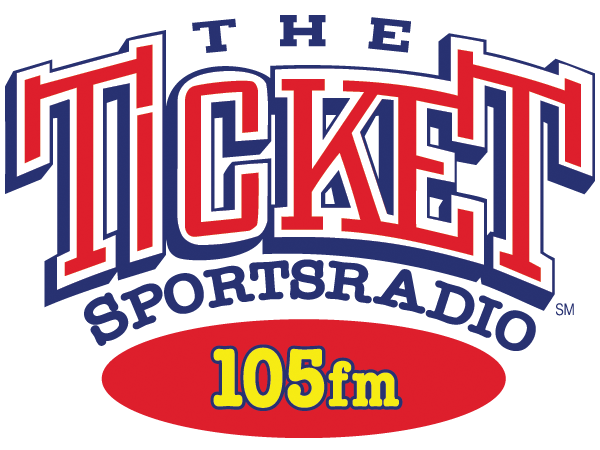
Former "105 The Ticket" logo, 2013-2015

At 8 a.m. on March 30, 2013, a day after inadvertently releasing a new logo and identity ("Radio 105") online (and after playing "Some Nights" by Fun and "Dreams" by Fleetwood Mac), the three stations dropped the AC format and began stunting with a broad range of music with no liners except for legally-mandated top-of-the-hour IDs. After stunting all weekend, on April 1 at 11 a.m., after playing "Gangnam Style" by Psy, the three stations dropped music altogether and became a CBS Sports Radio Network affiliate as "105 The Ticket".

The station's programming was mainly made up of nationally syndicated sports talk shows from CBS Sports Radio, including The D.A. Show, TBD in the AM, The John Feinstein Show, The Jim Rome Show, The Doug Gottlieb Show, Mojo, and Ferrall on the Bench.

On September 9, 2013, Mike Morris and Bob Sansevere began hosting Mike & Bob Afternoons that aired from 3 to 6 p.m. Morris is a former Minnesota Viking long snapper, while Sansevere is a longtime St. Paul Pioneer Press columnist and former contributor to the KQ92 Morning Show.

On June 9, 2015, 105.1/105.3/105.7 dropped Sansevere, Morris, and Holsen in favor of running CBS Sports Radio around the clock. Program Director Scott Jameson told the St. Paul Pioneer Press that the stations would "provide an alternative to the other two local (sports) stations" and "focus on the network product and provide it to people who prefer that." The stations retained local high school sports coverage on weekends. The change came as the stations registered just a 0.3 share in the previous three Nielsen Audio PPM ratings, well behind iHeartMedia's KFXN-FM and Hubbard's KSTP.

The Ticket, in an oversaturated sports talk market, did not live up to expectations, garnering less than 1.0 overall in the Arbitron ratings (with the final rating being a meager 0.1 in the July 2015 ratings).

=== 105 The Vibe ===
"105 The Vibe" logo (2015–2018)

On August 14, 2015, at 3 p.m., the 105 frequencies flipped to classic hip hop as “105 The Vibe”, which competed with K273BH/KTCZ-FM HD3 in the format. At the time of the launch, the Twin Cities market did not have a single commercial Urban, Urban AC or Rhythmic CHR formatted station. The only station that came close to the Urban/Rhythmic format was non-commercial KMOJ. In January 2016, KNOF flipped to KZGO with a current-based Rhythmic CHR format.

On June 22, 2016, WGVZ changed its call letters, no longer matching its simulcast partners. It is now WWWM-FM, part of a warehousing move where a co-owned station in Toledo, Ohio, changed its call letters to WQQO from WWWM-FM.

In June 2018, Cumulus Media applied to move the WLUP call letters to the WRXP signal in Minneapolis. The previous WLUP in New York state became WXMS upon acceptance of the application by the FCC. The change took effect on June 12, 2018. Cumulus had acquired the WLUP call sign earlier that year as part of its purchase of Chicago radio station WKQX from Merlin Media (whose CEO, Randy Michaels, owns the New York state station through Radioactive, LLC); the WLUP-FM call letters were formerly used on another Chicago station, WCKL, prior to its 2018 sale from Merlin Media to the Educational Media Foundation.

The ratings, however, still remained low for the trimulcast, with just an 0.8 in their last books under the format, the October 2018 Nielsen Audio ratings.

=== Love 105 returns ===
On November 8, 2018, at midnight, the 105 frequencies flipped to Christmas music, reviving the "Love 105" branding. The relaunch was mainly because of the overall success the trimulcast had experienced during its first run under the "Love 105" branding and Oldies/AC format. On December 28, at Midnight, the stations officially returned to the Soft AC/Oldies format they first pioneered in 2007 by playing "Yesterday Once More" by The Carpenters and "Love Will Keep Us Together" by Captain & Tennille.

By March 2023, the station's format shifted to a soft-leaning adult contemporary, with more upbeat titles being added to the playlist.

In May 2023, the nationally syndicated Delilah began airing in weekday evenings. John Tesh's "Intelligence For Your Life" show, which was previously heard in evenings, was moved to the afternoons.

In December 2023, the syndicated Bob & Sheri morning show was dropped in favor of a local morning show hosted by Chris O'Connor.

In July 2025, WLUP became the last of the three "Love" signals to add Radio Broadcast Data System (RBDS).

In the fall of 2025, local morning show host Chris O'Connor departed the station, temporarily leaving the station without a morning show host until the station announced that it would debut the nationally syndicated "TJ Show" in that timeslot.

=== The transition to Mainstream adult contemporary again and relaunch ===
Following the conclusion of its annual Christmas music programming on December 26, the station transitioned to a mainstream adult contemporary again, dropping all 1970's oldies and began adding more current songs. It also relaunched as “The New Love 105”, while also launching a new slogan “More Music, More Variety”. The first song on "The New Love 105" was "Hand in My Pocket" by Alanis Morissette.

=== HD Radio ===
In July 2019, a transmitter upgrade gave WLUP the ability to broadcast in HD Radio. WGVX and WWWM-FM do not transmit HD Radio signals. WLUP turned off its HD1 signal in early 2022.

== Stations ==
Call sign	Frequency	City of license	Facility ID	ERP (W)	HAAT	Class	Transmitter coordinates	Founded	Former call signs
WGVX	105.1 MHz	Lakeville, MN	61379	2,600	152 m (499 ft)	A	44°42′04″N 93°09′04″W	1992	KZPZ (1990–1993); WTCX (1993–1994); KREV (1994–1997); KXXP (1997); KZNR (1997–2001)
WLUP	105.3 MHz	Cambridge, MN	54838	25,000	91 m (299 ft)	C3	45°34′40″N 93°12′56″W	1973	KABG (1973–1983); KXLV-FM (1983–1991); WLOL (1991–1994); WREV-FM (1994–1997); KXXU (1997); KZNT (1997–2001); WGVY (2001–2012); WNSH (2012–2013); WRXP (2013–2018)
WWWM-FM	105.7 MHz	Eden Prairie, MN	61541	950	254 m (833 ft)	A	44°58′34″N 93°16′20″W	1993	KOUO (1992–1993); KCFE (1993–1997); KXXR (1997); KZNZ (1997–2001); WGVZ (2001–2016)
