= Dan Stoneking =

American sports journalist (1942–2007)

- Born: November 5, 1942; Moline, Illinois, US
- Died: January 29, 2007 (aged 64); Chetumal, Quintana Roo, Mexico
- Education: Northwestern University
- Occupations: Sports journalist, radio host
- Known for: Minneapolis Star; Professional Hockey Writers' Association
- Military career
- Allegiance: United States
- Branch: United States Army
- Service years: 1966–1968
- Rank: Sergeant
- Unit: 1st Air Cavalry Division
- Awards: Bronze Star Medal

Danny Alan Stoneking (November 5, 1942 – January 29, 2007) was an American journalist who was sports editor of the Minneapolis Star and president of the Professional Hockey Writers' Association. Stoneking covered National Hockey League and World Hockey Association games, the Minnesota Twins, sports at University of Minnesota, and promoted high school sports. He was the Minneapolis Star sports editor from 1974 until his suspension for plagiarism in 1984.

Stoneking pushed for equal access to locker rooms for male and female sportswriters, and was an executive of the Twin Cities chapter of the Baseball Writers' Association of America and the Minnesota Associated Press Sports Editors. He graduated from Northwestern University, was a United States Army sergeant during the Vietnam War, and was editor of the Stars and Stripes. In his later career, he reported on the Minnesota North Stars while hosting radio shows on KSTP and WTCN, and taught English and mass media.

== Early life and education ==
Danny Alan Stoneking was born on November 5, 1942, at the Moline Lutheran Hospital, in Moline, Illinois, the son of Albert E. Stoneking and Martha L. Stivers. Growing up in nearby Rock Island he graduated from Rock Island High School in 1960. (Note: Mr. and Mrs. Albert E. Stoneking announced the birth of a son on November 5, 1942, at the Lutheran Hospital, in Moline, Illinois.: Stoneking was reported to be age 25 as of November 18, 1967, indicating he was born in 1941 or 1942.; Stoneking was reported to be age 31 as of September 13, 1974, indicating he was born in 1942 or 1943.; Stoneking was reported to be age 64 as of January 29, 2007, indicating he was born in 1942 or 1943.; Stoneking was the son of Mr. and Mrs. Albert E. Stoneking of Rock Island, Illinois.; Danny Alan Stoneking was born on November 5, 1942, in Moline, Illinois, the son of Albert E. Stoneking and Martha L Stivers.; Stoneking graduated from Rock Island High School.; Son of Martha Stoneking. He graduated from Rock Island High School in 1960.) He began in journalism as a correspondent for the Rock Island Argus during high school, and worked summers with the newspaper while studying at Northwestern University. As a senior at the Medill School of Journalism, Stoneking was named to the dean's list, and elected to the university's Sigma Delta Chi chapter of professional journalists. After earning an undergraduate degree in 1964, he remained at Northwestern completing a master's degree in journalism in 1965.

== Journalism career ==
After university, Stoneking affiliated with the Jewish fraternity Phi Epsilon Pi, then worked for Lloyd Hollister Publications in Wilmette, Illinois, prior to accepting a position with the Minneapolis Star in 1965. He covered professional hockey, the Minnesota Twins, and sports at the University of Minnesota.

Stoneking served in the United States Army from 1966 to 1968. He was sports editor of the Guidon while training at Fort Leonard Wood, then deployed to the Vietnam War in July 1967 to serve in the adjutant general's office as a 1st Air Cavalry Division writer and historian. He rose to the rank of sergeant and received a Bronze Star Medal for heroic action near An Khê by saving the lives of three wounded soldiers from enemy fire. He had taken part in 25 combat missions by November 1967, when named editor of the Stars and Stripes based in Tokyo.

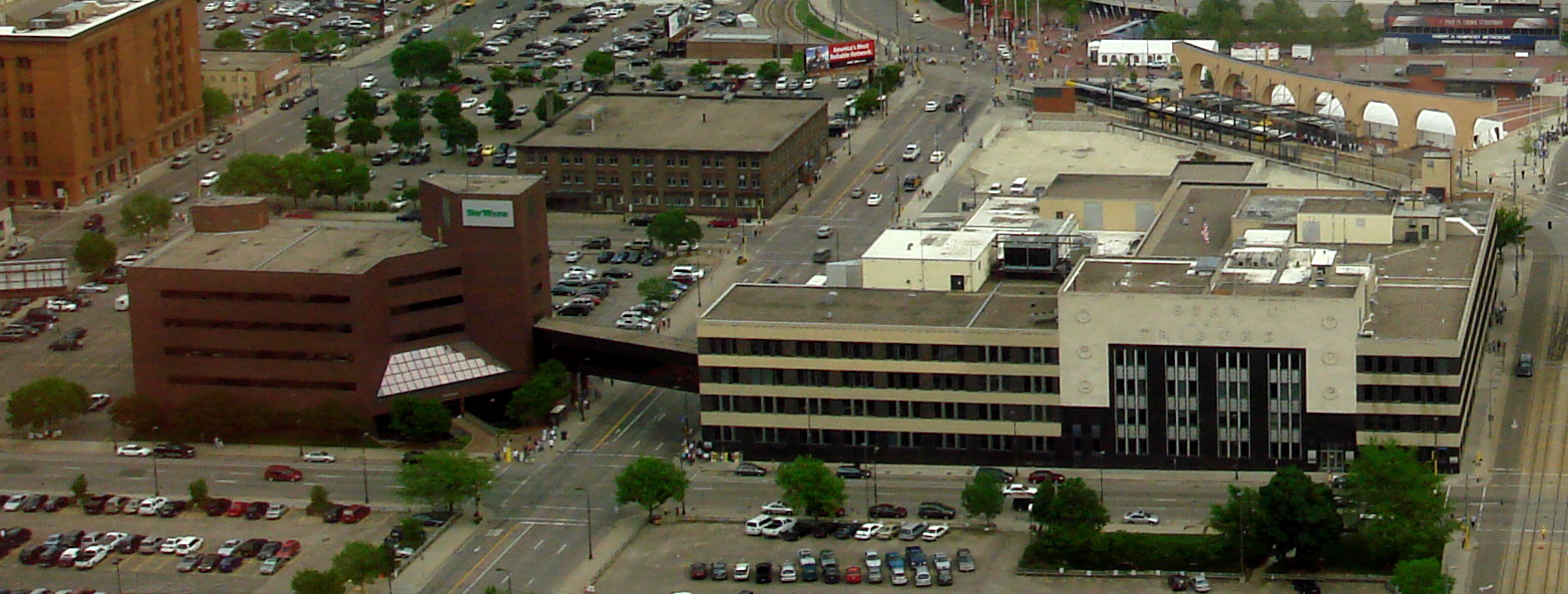
The Minneapolis Star building

Returning to Minneapolis, Stoneking was elected secretary-treasurer of the Twin Cities chapter of the Baseball Writers' Association of America in 1971, then its vice-president in 1972. He became a director of the Professional Hockey Writers' Association (PHWA) in 1971, then elected its vice-president in 1974. Later in the same year, he was named the Minneapolis Star sports editor, while covering National Hockey League (NHL) and World Hockey Association games. He assumed the PHWA presidency in 1975 from Bill Brennan, serving two years until succeeded by Bob Verdi. As president, Stoneking oversaw the PHWA mandate of improved media access to cover professional ice hockey.

Following a physical altercation between Detroit Red Wings' coach Doug Barkley and a Newark Star-Ledger reporter during the 1975–76 season, Stoneking protested to NHL president Clarence Campbell writing that the PHWA was "appalled, disgusted and angered over the incident" which denied post-game access to the team locker room, and demanded a public apology while the assault charges were under investigation. During the 1976 Stanley Cup Final, Stoneking supported equal access to locker rooms for male and female sportswriters. When Montreal Canadiens' coach Scotty Bowman opposed females in the locker room until the players were dressed, female reporters contested that access was required to do their job as timely as their male counterparts to meet publication deadlines. Stoneking presented the PHWA case to NHL president Campbell that both males and females should be allowed or neither. He claimed that approximately half of NHL teams allowed females to post-game access the locker rooms as of the 1977–78 season, and three-quarters of teams by the 1980–81 season.

In 1977, Stoneking was elected to the Minnesota Associated Press Sports Editors board of directors, which began broadcasting Minnesota State High School League scores for football state championships and ice hockey state championships via wire service, in addition to publishing a weekly column on high school football. He wrote featured articles on the North American Soccer League in 1978, and arranged exhibition games to showcase the talents of Minnesota Golden Gophers women's ice hockey. When the Minneapolis Star expanded its sports pages in 1979, Stoneking's staff grew to include a weekly column on sports television; and featured writers from the Chicago Tribune, the Los Angeles Times, and the Washington Post.

Stoneking received several awards from the Minnesota Associated Press Sports Editors including; first place for special sections, second place for sports series, and third place for spot news in 1980; first place for his column on Terry Bradshaw, second place for his column on Harmon Killebrew, and third place for spot news reports on Minnesota North Stars playoffs in 1981; and second place for spot news in 1982. He was also inducted into the World Hockey Association Hall of Fame as a beat writer for the Minnesota Fighting Saints.

== Later career and radio ==
The Minneapolis Star suspended Stoneking for plagiarism of a report on the Minnesota Twins in 1984. Never returning, he instead covered the Minnesota North Stars on radio. North Stars' general manager Lou Nanne stated that Stoneking was trusted with team secrets, and subjected to player pranks as an "honorary teammate". Stoneking was a sports talk host for KSTP in the 1980s, and broadcast a live weekly sports show on WTCN in 1989. He was a candidate to be the Minnesota North Stars radio announcer in the 1990–91 season.

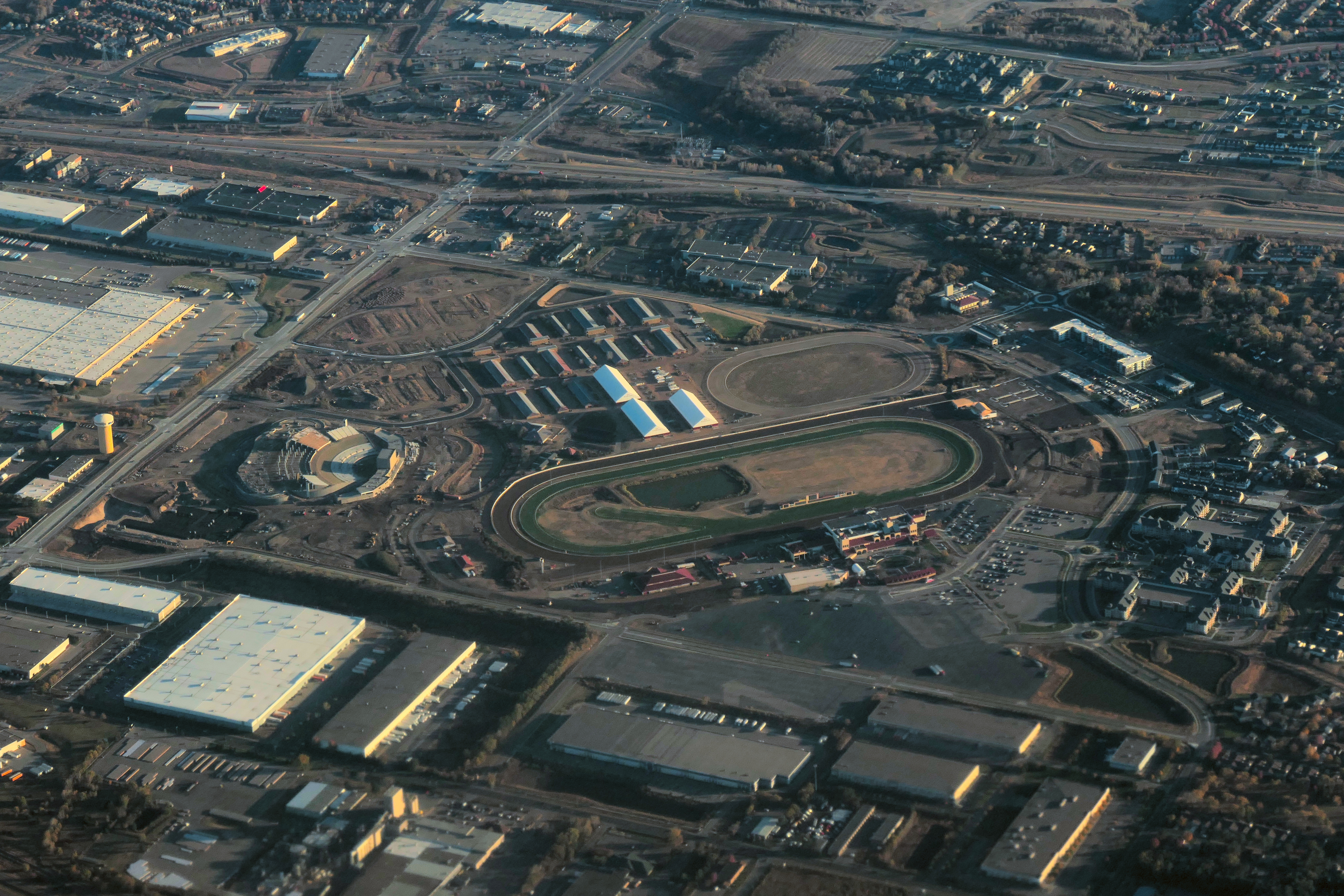
Canterbury Downs

Stoneking wrote for the Stillwater Gazette, and had work published by Sports Illustrated. In 1985, he was editor of the Post Times newspaper for Canterbury Downs horse racing track. In the 1990s, he taught English and mass media at a college in Mexico.

== Personal life and death ==
Stoneking married Sarah Parry on July 10, 1965, in Wilmette. After visiting Wisconsin, they resided in St. Louis Park, Minnesota. His wife was a fellow Northwestern University graduate, then became a school teacher. They had a daughter and a son. He coached his daughter playing soccer when they lived in Burnsville, was also a longtime resident of Saint Paul, and later married Irma Sanchez.

Stoneking participated in celebrity golf tournaments in the Twin Cities area. He once had the personalized license plate "Mr. Puck", had cancer for twelve years, and moved to Chetumal, Mexico, for the last two years of his life, where he died from pneumonia at age 64, on January 29, 2007.
