= KMNQ =

Coordinates: 45°05′17″N 93°22′59″W

- Brooklyn Park, Minnesota; United States
- Broadcast area: Minneapolis-St. Paul
- Frequency: 1470 kHz
- Branding: Amor Radio

Programming
- Format: Spanish AC

Ownership
- Owner: Maya Santamaria; (Santamaria Broadcasting, Inc.)
- Sister stations: KMNV

History
- First air date: 1956
- Former call signs: KANO (1956–1979); KTWN (1979–1983); KKKC (1983–1984); KANO (1984–1991); KBCW (1991–1994); WLOL (1994–1999); KLBP (1999–2005); KLBB (2005–2006); KZTG (2006–2007); KRJJ (2007–2008)

Technical information
- Licensing authority: FCC
- Facility ID: 101
- Class: B
- Power: 5,000 watts (currently 3,500 watts)

Links
- Public license information: Public file; LMS
- Website: amorradiomn.com

KMNQ (1470 AM) is a commercial radio station licensed to Brooklyn Park, Minnesota, and serving the Twin Cities radio market. The station broadcasts a Spanish AC format. The station previously was a simulcast of sister station KMNV, playing traditional Regional Mexican music. In October 2021, it began stunting with a variety format, before leaving the air entirely in early 2022. In January 2023, it returned, again simulcasting sister station KMNV. The station has experienced periods of silence over its lifetime.

KMNQ's radio studios were located on 27th Avenue South and East Lake Street in Minneapolis. Those studios burned in the Minneapolis Riots following the murder of George Floyd in May 2020. The station returned to the air with help from KFAI, which offered space in its facility. Studios were subsequently established in Richfield.

The transmitter is located in Brooklyn Park near Bottineau Blvd. KMNQ’s power is 5,000 watts using a directional antenna to protect other stations on 1470 AM.

== History ==
Starting in 1994, 1470 was simulcast KLBB (1400 AM), which played big band, lounge and middle of the road (MOR) music (often referred to as adult standards). Both stations were operated as The KLBB Company, a for-profit subsidiary of the Greenspring Company owned by American Public Media Group, which operates Minnesota Public Radio and other properties. MPR announced on May 25, 2005, that it had reached an agreement to sell both KLBB and KLBP to Davidson Media Group, a New York City-based broadcaster specializing in multi-cultural, community focused formats. Thereafter, KLBB flipped to a Spanish-language format, while the format on KLBP remained MOR until July 17, 2006, when it switched to a gospel music format from the Buffalo, New York-based Totally Gospel Radio Network with the KZTG call letters. The sale of both stations was approved by the FCC on July 25, 2005, with Davidson Media taking control September 7, 2005.

Over the years, the station carried various formats under the call letters KANO (standing for "Anoka") (also album rock as KTWN in 1979 and country music as KKKC in 1983). In 1984 the station brought back the KANO calls with a soft rock/oldies format with heavy emphasis on local sports and news before becoming KBCW in 1991, which broadcast a classic country music format.

Additionally, the station increased its power from 1,000 watts to 5,000 watts and began 24-hour operation. Cargill Communications purchased both KLBB and KBCW in 1993, along with WTCX (105.1 FM) and WLOL (105.3 FM) for the basis of a proposed alternative rock station, soon to become known as "REV105". Cargill was uncomfortable with dropping the much loved adult standards format of KLBB, so the format was retained with a content and branding overhall, and 1470 was converted to a simulcast of KLBB, moving the well-known WLOL call letters (albeit well known on original frequencies 1330 AM and 99.5 FM) to 1470. In 1999, James and Susan Cargill, who two years earlier had sold the three FM stations that made up REV105, donated 1400 and 1470 (soon to be renamed KLBP) to Minnesota Public Radio, where the two frequencies became part of the commercial Minnesota News Network (MNN). MPR sold its other station, WMNN, the MNN flagship station, along with the network in 2004, but retained KLBB and KLBP. By now, the "Club 14" simulcast was carrying a mix of local personalities and the "Music Of Your Life" radio network.

KLBB finally transitioned to its long-promised Spanish-language format on November 4, 2005, leaving the adult standards/big band format on KLBP and ending the long time "Club 14" simulcast. The KMNV call letters were introduced to 1400 on December 16, 2005, just months after its switch to regional Mexican music, while the KLBB call letters moved to sister station 1470. Following 1470's switch to gospel music, the KLBB call letters and much of its programming were picked up by 1220 AM in Stillwater on July 25, 2006. On March 7, 2007, the station changed its call letters to KRJJ. The station is also the Spanish-language broadcast partner for the Minnesota Twins. Davidson Media sold KMNQ and sister station KMNV to Santamaria Broadcasting, Inc. effective May 5, 2016, for $1.2 million.

Citing the COVID-19 pandemic and equipment updates, KMNQ went silent for an extended period of time beginning in March 2020. KMNV itself went silent on May 27 after its studios were burned during the George Floyd protests. The station returned to air in 2021, returning to its Regional Mexican format. In late 2021, the station broke from the simulcast with music and talk programming.

After a long period of silence, the station returned to air on or around January 1, 2023, simulcasting KMNV as it had in the past. The next day, it was silent again. The station returned to air sporadically during January, often on for only 24 hours at a time.

In August 2024, the station stopped its long running simulcast of KMNV, and began playing more romantic Spanish music. The station brands itself "Amor", the Spanish word for "love". The station was off air for several days in August 2024, returning with the new format.

== See also ==
- KMNV
- KLBB (AM)
