= Klaipėda Radio Station =

Radio station in Lithuania

Klaipėda Radio Station (Lithuanian: Klaipėdos radijo stotis) was a broadcast transmitting radio station located in Jakai (55°42′01″N 21°13′22″E) near the city of Klaipėda. It operated from 1936 to 1944.

The station was built by Latvian company VEF in early 1936, and started regular broadcasting in May 1936. It was officially inaugurated in September 1936. Transmitter had the output power of 10 kW, it was fed into a vertical non-directional antenna hanging between two 66 meter high masts. The frequency was:

- 977 kHz during testing phase, March—April 1936.
- 565 kHz in 1936—1939.
- 1285 kHz during World War II.

The station carried programming produced by the following broadcast organisations:

- 1936—1939: Radio Klaipėda and Radio Kaunas (Lithuania).
- 1939—1944: Reichs-Rundfunk-Gesellschaft (RRG, Germany) and its studio in Königsberg.

At the end of World War II retreating Germans dismantled station's equipment to take it to Germany, and destroyed the station's antennas. After the war, a school was set in the remaining building. The station was never rebuilt.
