= Greenspring Media =

American publishing company in Minnesota

Greenspring Media is a publisher of Minnesota-focused publications. The company publishes two subscription magazines, Minnesota Monthly and Midwest Home, as well as custom publications including Real Food, Where Twin Cities, Twin Cities Living, Minneapolis Meeting & Planner's Guide, Bloomington-Mall of America Visitors Guide (in partnership with Bloomington Convention & Tourism Bureau and the Mall of America), Minneapolis-Saint Paul Official Visitors Guide, and Visit-TwinCities.Com.

== History ==
The publisher was established with a single publication in 1967. In 2013, Greenspring Media Group was sold to Hour Media. Greenspring Media is located in Bloomington, Minnesota. It covers the Twin Cities (Minneapolis-St. Paul).

In 2017, Minnesota Monthly celebrated its 50th year of publication, with Midwest Home celebrating its 25th anniversary.
