= 1936 in radio =

The year 1936 saw a number of significant events in radio broadcasting.

== Events ==
- 1 January – Cessation of all commercial radio broadcasting in Germany.
- 2 January – Bing Crosby becomes full-time host of the Kraft Music Hall, following Paul Whiteman, after having been a guest host on 5 December 1935.
- 20 March – The Lisnagarvey transmitter begins service, broadcasting the Northern Ireland Regional Programme of the BBC on a frequency of 977 kHz.
- 25 March – First radio broadcast from the Parliament of New Zealand.
- 30 March – Backstage Wife moves from Mutual to the NBC Blue Network.
- 28 May – The Klaipėda transmission station in Lithuania enters regular service, broadcasting programmes from Radio Klaipėda and Radio Kaunas on a frequency of 565 kHz.
- 8 June – All India Radio is launched after years of experimental broadcasting.
- 12 June – Pittsburgh becomes the first city in the U.S. to have a 50,000 watt ("blowtorch") station.
- 6 September – Fireside chat: On Drought Conditions
- 17 September – Major Bowes Amateur Hour moves from the NBC Red Network to CBS.
- 2 November – The Canadian Broadcasting Corporation (CBC) takes over responsibility for public service broadcasting in Canada from the Canadian Radio Broadcasting Commission (CRBC).
- 11 December – In a worldwide radio broadcast, King Edward VIII of the United Kingdom makes a speech from Windsor Castle explaining the reasons for his abdication of the throne.

== Debuts ==
- 5 January – Famous Jury Trials debuts on WLW.
- 12 January – Radio-Cité transmits (under its initial title of Autour de la table) the first episode of the long-running daily serial La Famille Duraton, which will continue on various stations until 1966.
- 27 January – David Harum debuts on NBC.
- 31 January – The Green Hornet debuts on WXYZ.
- 7 February – The Flying Red Horse Tavern debuts on CBS.
- 29 February – The Ziegfeld Follies of the Air debuts on CBS.
- 3 March – Renfrew of the Mounted debuts on CBS.
- 28 June – Ma and Pa debuts on CBS.
- 4 September – Bughouse Rhythm debuts on NBC.
- 14 September – Big Sister debuts on CBS.
- 14 September – John's Other Wife debuts on NBC.
- 26 September – Hal Peary first appears as Throckmorton P. Gildersleeve on Fibber McGee and Molly.
- 30 September – The Bishop and the Gargoyle debuts on the Blue Network.
- 18 November – Robert Lachmann begins a series of live radio broadcasts for the Palestine Broadcasting Service, called Oriental Music.
- Mordecai Ham begins his radio ministry in the United States.

== Finales ==
- 22 May – The Flying Red Horse Tavern ends its run on network radio (CBS).
- 14 September – Carefree Carnival ends its run on network radio (NBC Red).

== Births ==
- 2 March – John Tusa, Czech-born British broadcast presenter and administrator.
- 14 March – Mike Eghan (died 2025), Ghanaian broadcaster
- 30 March – John Tydeman (died 2020), British radio drama producer.
- 21 April – James Dobson, American chairman of Focus on the Family, host of the international daily radio show of the same name.
- 16 May – Roy Hudd (died 2020), English comedy performer.
- 1 August – Laurie Taylor, English sociologist and radio presenter.
- 4 September – Wayne Cody (died 2002), American radio and television sportscaster who spends the bulk of his career at KIRO in Seattle, Washington.
- 11 September – Roger Barkley (died 1997), American radio personality and talk show host, best remembered for his work with Al Lohman as part of The Lohman and Barkley Show on KFI Los Angeles, California.
- 20 November – Bill Wallis (died 2013), English character actor.

== Deaths ==
- 23 January – Dame Clara Butt, contralto opera singer, 63
- 17 February – Hiram Percy Maxim, 66, co-founder of the American Radio Relay League
- 6 April – Väinö Lehmus, 50, Finnish stage, film and radio actor
- 15 August – Sir Henry Lytton, Gilbert & Sullivan comic baritone singer and actor, 71
