= KXXR =

Active rock radio station in Minneapolis, Minnesota

Coordinates: 45.058°N 93.124°W

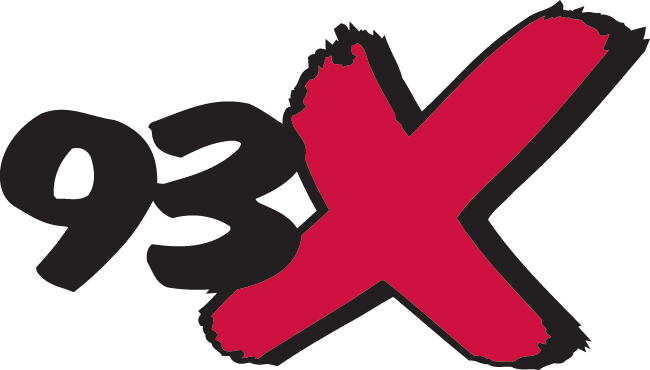
- Minneapolis, Minnesota; United States
- Broadcast area: Minneapolis-St. Paul
- Frequency: 93.7 MHz (HD Radio)
- RDS: PI: 4F23; PS: Artist Title 93X; RT: Artist - Title
- Branding: 93X

Programming
- Format: Active rock
- Subchannels: HD2: Adult Contemporary (WGVX simulcast)

Ownership
- Owner: Cumulus Media; (Radio License Holdings LLC)
- Sister stations: KQRS-FM, WGVX, WWWM-FM, WLUP

History
- First air date: October 1960
- Former call signs: WAYL (1960–1988); KLXK (1988–1990); KRXX (1990–1994); KEGE (1994–1997)
- Call sign meaning: "93X Rocks"

Technical information
- Licensing authority: FCC
- Facility ID: 35506
- Class: C
- ERP: 100,000 watts
- HAAT: 315 m (1,033 ft)

Links
- Public license information: Public file; LMS
- Webcast: Listen Live; Listen Live via iHeart
- Website: www.93x.com

KXXR (93.7 FM) is an active rock radio station broadcasting to the Minneapolis-St. Paul metropolitan area. It is owned by Cumulus Media, which also owns KQRS-FM along with WGVX, WLUP, and WWWM. Its transmitter is located in Shoreview, Minnesota. Its studios are in Southeastern Minneapolis in the Como district near the University of Minnesota.

== History ==
Through much of its early history, the station was known as WAYL, airing a beautiful music format. When the format fell out of favor nationwide during the 1980s, the frequency enjoyed success with several rock music formats. The station once broadcast using the CAM-D system.

=== 1960–1988: WAYL ===
WAYL signed on the air with a beautiful music format in October 1960 and originally broadcast on 96.1 FM. They soon began broadcasting in stereo. A few years later, WAYL moved to 93.7 FM. Entertainment Communications (later Entercom) acquired the station in 1969.

In 1976, Entercom added an AM sister station with the purchase of WYOO (980 AM).

=== 1988–1992: WAYL-FM becomes KLXK ===
In July 1988, due to the aging demographics of the beautiful music format (and despite high ratings), WAYL became classic hits KLXK, with the beautiful music format moving to 980 AM. KLXK was clearly influenced by another young station, WKLH in Milwaukee, which had recently adopted a similar format. KLXK enjoyed modest success, but rival KQRS-FM had retooled their format to include a large amount of classic rock product, and also had the top-rated morning show in the market.

=== 1992-1994: "93X" ===
KLXK eventually decided to attack KQRS from another front. On January 28, 1992, 93.7 flipped to hard rock with the call sign KRXX ("93X"). Their co-owned AM station had earlier flipped to a similar hard rock format as KMZZ, initially airing the syndicated Z-Rock network for a time before briefly switching to a locally-based automated heavy metal format ("Mega Rock 980") and finally simulcasting 93X by 1993.

=== 1994–1997: "The Edge": KQRS buys KRXX ===
Cap Cities/ABC, the owner of the rival KQRS-FM, took control of 93X pending purchase (but not KMZZ, which was sold separately later) from Entercom on February 4, 1994. The selling price was $20 million, then a record for the highest amount ever paid for a radio station in the market. The following day, 93X began stunting with a loop of one of the most popular stunting songs, "It's the End of the World as We Know It" by R.E.M. throughout the weekend. Confused listeners flocked in droves to the KRXX studios in Eagan that Saturday to see what was going on. Some listeners thought the DJs were being held hostage and reportedly, more than 50 calls regarding KRXX were logged to 911. Finally, on Sunday, February 6, at 8 p.m., 93.7 began simulcasting KQRS' weekly alternative rock show, "Over the Edge", leading the way for "93.7 The Edge", which billed itself as "Minnesota's New Rock Alternative". In a massively popular stunt to secure 93X listeners, the first song played after the switch was the same song as the stunting prior to the launch, "It's the End of the World as We Know It" by R.E.M.. The new call sign KEGE-FM was soon registered for the new station. The move to create The Edge was due to the growing popularity of modern rock format nationwide, and to thwart Cargill Communications' pending plans to roll out the format on the new Rev 105. The Edge came on the air almost two years after KJJO switched to country music, and it did what KJ104 couldn't: it became a massive ratings success. At one point, KEGE had the highest overall Arbitron market ratings of any modern rock station in the country.

A station-sponsored annual concert known as the “EdgeFest” (later “93XFest”) debuted soon after, and took place annually in Somerset, Wisconsin. It was so popular that even rival Rev 105 gave away tickets for it (though not mentioning the "Edgefest" name). When KEGE went back to being 93X and the "Edge" name was retired in the Twin Cities, the festival briefly continued as "Edgefest" and was later renamed “93XFest”. The annual festival in Somerset continued until 2004, when "93X Riverfest" replaced it.

=== 1997–present: The return of 93X ===
Following the Telecommunications Act of 1996 that relaxed ownership restrictions, ABC purchased KEGE's rival, "Rev 105" in March 1997 and immediately began broadcasting hard rock on that station as "X105". Later that year, on September 18, at 2 p.m., the two stations did a format swap of sorts, with 93.7 returning to active rock and the “93X” moniker with new callsign KXXR, while The Edge's format moved over to the 105 frequencies and rebranded as "Zone 105" (though it would be tweaked to adult album alternative) on September 24 after six days of simulcasting 93X on all four frequencies. On the final day of broadcasting, The Edge played "It's the End of the World as We Know It" by R.E.M. on a continuous loop.

ABC sold its non-Radio Disney and ESPN Radio stations, including KXXR, to Citadel Broadcasting in 2007. Citadel merged with Cumulus Media on September 16, 2011.

== HD Radio ==
In 2007, the station added an HD signal for its main programming. It also offered an HD2 channel featuring a CHR/Top 40 format branded as "The Machine", which aired for several years until the station ceased HD operations at midnight on December 31, 2014. On January 2, 2018, KXXR-HD2 "The Machine" returned to the air with a Top 40 format.

Programmed by KQRS-FM jock Chris Nelson, "The Machine" featured a commercial-free top 40 format. KXXR-HD2's main competition included iHeartMedia's heritage CHR station in the market, KDWB-FM, along with Hubbard Broadcasting's KSTP-FM. Throughout its existence, there was no online stream available for "The Machine", and was exclusive to KXXR-HD2.

In January 2023, KXXR-HD2 switched the format to a simulcast of the "Love 105" soft adult contemporary format heard on sister stations WGVX, WLUP and WWWM.

In May 2023, KXXR discontinued its HD signal altogether due to transmitter issues.

In the early months of 2024, KXXR began transmitting an HD signal once again.

In March 2025, KXXR HD2 discontinued its simulcast of Love 105.

In June 2025, KXXR once again discontinued broadcasting an HD Radio signal.

As of December 2025, KXXR is once again broadcasting in HD Radio and has returned the "Love 105" simulcast to KXXR-HD2.
