= Tom Barnard =

American radio host

Thomas 'Tom' Mark Paul Barnard (born November 7, 1951) is an American radio host and former voice-over talent. He was released by Cumulus from the host of The KQ92 Morning Show on 92.5 KQRS in Minneapolis-St. Paul at the end of 2022 after hosting mornings for 37 years. He currently hosts The Tom Barnard Podcast, which is produced by Hubbard Broadcasting.

== Personal ==
Barnard was born in Long Prairie, Minnesota and raised in North Minneapolis. He and his wife Kathryn Brandt live in Edina, Minnesota. On March 20th, 2026 Tom Barnard announced on his family podcast that he had been diagnosed with Alzheimer’s.

== Career ==
Before coming to KQRS, Barnard worked at numerous stations including WDGY and KSTP (as "The Catman"). Until 1986, he was the booth announcer for KSTP-TV.

Barnard, and then-partner Dan Culhane, started the "Tom and Dan" show in 1986 featuring sports reports from WCCO-TV sports anchor Mark Rosen. At one point, the team of Barnard and Culhane spearheaded a write-in campaign to elect Rosen For Governor of Minnesota. Culhane was eventually pushed out of the broadcast in a personnel move, while Rosen was "persuaded" by WCCO TV's parent company to move his morning sports to WCCO-AM.

Barnard gave an in-depth interview to the St. Paul Pioneer Press in which he discussed his strained relationship with his deceased father and compared his radio persona to that of his actual personality. Earlier in his career, Barnard and Culhane were guests with two other Twin Cities radio show duos on a local morning television show in 1988.

Although he is semi-retired from voice-over work, Barnard can currently be heard in radio ads for Home Depot. For many years Barnard's voice was heard in various markets, introducing shows and appearing on commercials.

On September 29, 2009's Morning Show wrap-up, Barnard casually mentioned that he's planning to retire from live radio on December 21, 2012. Tom specifically said Terri would take over the Morning show, moments later the discussion moved to a "play off" for host during the year 2012. Tom explained that the 21st is a Friday and it's just before Christmas.

On March 29, 2013, Barnard announced on the air that he would be entering treatment for issues in regard to anger, not substance abuse as previously reported.

In February 2020, Barnard and Cumulus Media announced Barnard had signed an 8 year extension to remain at KQRS until 2028, when he will be 76 years old. In a 2021 interview with KSTP-TV he has announced his retirement. His final show was December 23, 2022. The KQ Morning Show continues with Steve Gorman of The Black Crowes replacing Barnard.

Several weeks after retiring from KQRS-FM, Barnard began a weekday three-hour podcast, produced by Hubbard Broadcasting. The third hour of the podcast was also heard on 105 The Ticket from 6:00 pm to 7:00 pm in the Minneapolis-St. Paul area. As of February 2024, the podcast was no longer broadcast on 105 The Ticket.

=== Controversy ===
Barnard has long prided himself on what he refers to as his "insensitive" humor, notably in 1998 when, while working for KQRS, he made racist statements on-air following an influx in Hmong refugee immigration to the Twin Cities and subsequently declared Hmong immigrants should "assimilate or hit the goddamn road." After receiving criticism for his statements, Barnard responded on-air on October 20, 1998: “I will attack who I want to attack.”

Following Barnard's remarks, Hmong activists formed Community Action Against Racism (CAAR), a "multiracial coalition of whites, Latinos, and Asian and African Americans", which organized and drew attention to the issue. CAAR demanded an apology and "successfully organized an economic boycott of the station." While KQRS issued an apology, many in the Twin Cities still called for Barnard's termination as Barnard had continued to make offensive and derogatory statements about "Somalis, African Americans, Mexican Americans and Native Americans" on air.

== Awards ==
Barnard won the 2006 Marconi award for Large Market Personality of the Year.

Barnard was inducted into the radio Hall of Fame in 2017, and the Minnesota Broadcasters Hall of Fame in 2018.

The Marconi awards recognize excellence in radio broadcasting.
