= 92 KQRS Morning Show =

American radio program

- Genre: Comedy - Hot Talk - Classic Rock
- Running time: 5:40 A.M.-10:00 A.M. Central Time Zone
- Country of origin: United States
- Home station: KQRS-FM Minneapolis–St Paul
- Created by: Mark Steinmetz, Dave Hamilton
- Original release: 1986 – current
- Website: 92 KQRS Morning Show
- Podcast: Podcast

The 92 KQRS Morning Show (also known as the KQ Morning Crew) is a popular, long-running radio morning drive time show originating from KQRS-FM in Minneapolis, Minnesota. From the 1990s into the early 2000s, it was one of the highest-rated morning shows in the U.S.

The show was hosted by Tom Barnard for 37 years, retiring at the end of 2022. Barnard was replaced by Steve Gorman of the rock group The Black Crowes. Brian Zepp, Candice Wheeler and Tony Lee are also heard on the show.

== Controversy ==
=== Asian-Americans ===
On June 9, 1998, Barnard was reading a news item about a Hmong girl who had killed her newborn son. The crew made several derisive remarks. In particular, Barnard stated that Hmongs should "assimilate or hit the goddamn road." and, in response to his reading of the $10,000 fine levied against the girl, "That's a lot of egg rolls." KQRS weathered protests from the Asian-American community and eventually issued a public apology in addition to making several PR-building concessions to the community. In a related concession, Tony Lee's stereotypical character "Tak" and his segment, "A Talk with Tak" was removed from the show.

=== Native Americans ===
In September 2007, Bernard made comments about the Minnesota Chippewa and Sioux tribes. The American Indian Alliance that raised concerns from the tribes. The tribes mounted several protests throughout October, and the station again issued a public apology.
