= KLBB (AM) =

Coordinates: 45°03′15″N 92°49′42″W

Stillwater, Minnesota; United States
- Frequency: 1220 kHz
- Branding: Club 1220, KLBB

Programming
- Format: Defunct

Ownership
- Owner: Dan Smith; (Endurance Broadcasting, LLC)

History
- First air date: March 1949 (as WSHB)
- Last air date: September 21, 2022; 3 years ago
- Former call signs: WSHB (1949–1955); WAVN (1955–1983); WVLE (1983–1985); WTCN (1985–1993); WIMN (1993–1997); WEZU (1997–2003); WMGT (2003–2006)
- Call sign meaning: "Club"

Technical information
- Facility ID: 60646
- Class: B
- Power: 5,000 watts daytime (licensed); 254 watts night (licensed); 20 watts temporary (as of March 2019)

KLBB (1220 AM) was an AM radio station licensed to Stillwater, Minnesota, serving the eastern suburban Twin Cities area and western-central Wisconsin. It was locally and independently last owned by Dan & Gretchen Smith. Known as “Club 12-20,” KLBB formerly played adult standards and classic hits. It was the Twin Cities affiliate of the Green Bay Packers Radio Network. Other programming included “The Wolf Brewing All Request and Dedication Show with Stan Turner,” “The Morning Show with Jeff Petersen” and was the Twin Cities flagship station for Saint Paul Saints Baseball and Stillwater Ponies Football.

The studios and transmitter were located in Stillwater, Minnesota. At full power, the daytime signal area covered the Twin Cities of Minneapolis and St. Paul as well as portions of western Wisconsin.

KLBB carried news updates at top of hour from Fox News Radio, Minnesota Network News, and local news from the KLBB News Desk focusing on the eastern Twin Cities area and western Wisconsin. Weather from Weatherology was also heard at the top of the hour.

KLBB was also an affiliate of Westwood One's Adult Standards format, which featured adult standards from artists such as Frank Sinatra, Tony Bennett, Harry Connick, Jr., and Michael Bublé as well as classics from the Beatles to contemporary music from such artists as Celine Dion & Diana Krall.

On weekends, KLBB aired programs such as “The Stan Turner Show,” “Flashback Twin Cities with Tom Oszman,” “The Sounds of Sinatra,” “Shake Rattle Showtime,” “Martini Mix with Mike Martin”, “Sunday Morning Worship from St. Andrew’s; a live broadcast of worship services from St. Andrew’s Lutheran Church in Mahtomedi, Minnesota.

KLBB also included national and local features such as “The Osgood File,” “Bill Scott’s Titletown Report,” “Rudy Maxa’s Travel Minute,” “Community Calendar,” “Here’s What’s Happening in the Saint Croix Valley” and “Success Journal.” For over 25 years, incentives from local businesses were offered on “The Super Saver” show.

Signing on in 1949, the 1220 AM frequency had a series of call letters including WSHB (1949 sign-on to 1955), WAVN (1955–1983), WVLE (1983–1985), WTCN (1985–1993), WIMN (1993-1/1/1997), WEZU (1/1/1997-2003), WMGT "The Mighty 12-20" (2003–2006), and KLBB (2006–2018).

Noted personalities included Roger Erickson, Stan Turner, Ruth Koscielak, Ralph Jon Fritz, Bob Yates and Lee Valsvik.

KLBB ceased broadcasting at 11:59 PM (CT) on March 31, 2018. The 3.6 acres of land in Stillwater on which the station's radio tower was located had been sold for residential development. The announcement of the station's demise was made a month prior on February 28. KLBB concluded its final broadcast with a message from station owner Dan Smith, followed by the Frank Sinatra song, “One for My Baby (And One More for the Road)”. Following that, the station’s transmitter was turned off.

The station returned to the air at the end of March 2019 before its license would have met the FCC's cancellation criteria, using a temporary antenna setup atop the station's studio building to transmit with a power of 20 watts until a permanent transmitter site was found. KLBB continued to operate at low power, primarily simulcasting NOAA Weather Radio, while seeking a new transmitter location; in May 2022, the station also disclosed that it was in negotiations to be sold. On September 21, 2022, the KLBB license was surrendered, and it was cancelled by the Federal Communications Commission on September 23, 2022.

== Personalities ==
- Dan Stoneking, sports show host on WTCN in the 1980s

== See also ==
- KMNV
- KMNQ
