= WLOL (AM) =

- Minneapolis, Minnesota; United States
- Broadcast area: Minneapolis–St. Paul
- Frequency: 1330 kHz
- Branding: Relevant Radio

Programming
- Format: Catholic radio
- Network: Relevant Radio

Ownership
- Owner: Relevant Radio; (Relevant Radio, Inc.)

History
- First air date: June 16, 1940 (86 years ago)
- Former call signs: WLOL (1940–1978); WRRD (1978–1980); KSJN (1980–1989); KNOW (1989–1995); WMNN (1995–2004)
- Former frequencies: 1300 kHz (1940–1941)
- Call sign meaning: "Land of Lakes"; "Our Lady of Lourdes"

Technical information
- Licensing authority: FCC
- Facility ID: 42963
- Class: B
- Power: 9,700 watts (day); 5,100 watts (night)
- Transmitter coordinates: 44°47′02″N 93°20′38″W

Links
- Public license information: Public file; LMS
- Webcast: Listen live
- Website: relevantradio.com

WLOL (1330 AM) is a radio station in the Twin Cities region of Minnesota. It broadcasts a Catholic radio format and is part of the Relevant Radio network. WLOL's transmitter is located along the Minnesota River in Savage.

== History ==
WLOL, named for the "Land Of Lakes", is one of the area's most legendary set of call letters. WLOL's history is intertwined with many other local frequencies over the years. The first incarnation of WLOL signed on at 1300 AM on June 16, 1940, and was a part of the Mutual Broadcasting System, a national radio network in the United States. Studios were at 1730 Hennepin Avenue, at Oak Grove Street across from Loring Park, approximately in the current-day airspace over the westbound lanes of I-94 exiting the Lowry Hill Tunnel. The transmitter was in St. Paul's Midway district. WLOL moved to 1330 AM on March 29, 1941, as required by the North American Regional Broadcasting Agreement (NARBA) under which most American, Canadian and Mexican AM radio stations changed frequencies. An FM broadcast began in 1956 when the owners of WLOL purchased WMIN-FM, which had been broadcasting at 99.5 MHz since 1945.

The AM station aired a variety of formats over the years, including Top 40 in the 1950s, country music, and a brief return to Top 40 in 1979 as WRRD, "13 Rock", which prided itself as an anti-disco station. Studio locations after the original Hennepin Avenue address include three downtown Minneapolis locations at 1021 LaSalle Avenue, the Northwestern National Bank Building at S. 6th Street & Marquette Avenue, 801 Nicollet Avenue/76 S. 8th Street (same building, alternate addresses), plus 1370 Davern Street in St. Paul (co-located with the station's three antennae), MPR's facilities in downtown St. Paul and later again in downtown Minneapolis at 331 S. 11th Street.

WLOL carried University of Minnesota sports for many years. Ray Christensen announced Gopher football until the mid-1960s, when he moved to WCCO and continued as the Gophers' announcer. Frank Buetel announced Gopher football, hockey and basketball games in the 1970s. From 1972 to 1976, WLOL aired games of the Minnesota Fighting Saints of the World Hockey Association, with Buetel announcing.

Minneapolis native James Aurness worked at WLOL as a part-time announcer in 1945 for less than a year. He moved to Los Angeles in 1946 and later gained fame as a film and TV actor under the name James Arness, best known as Marshal Matt Dillon in TV's Gunsmoke. Steve Cannon, while best known for his 26 years at WCCO, first worked at WLOL in the mid-late 1950s. Leigh Kamman, noted jazz historian and broadcaster, was at WLOL for two stints; first in the mid-late 1940s and again in the mid-late 1950s.

WLOL almost expanded into TV. In 1954, it applied, as did competitors WDGY and KEYD, for channel 9 in the Twin Cities. However, WLOL and WDGY withdrew their applications at the last minute. The new station was awarded to KEYD and went on-air in January 1955. It is known today as Fox O&O KMSP-TV.

In the winter of 1961, WLOL-AM-FM engaged in a novel experiment to give listeners an experience with stereo broadcasting. Paul Hedberg, a WLOL disc jockey in the early 1960s, recalled the episode in his autobiography: "WLOL's chief engineer, Bryce Eckberg, came up with an idea for creating a stereo broadcast by simulcasting one channel of a stereo album on the FM band at 99.5 and the other channel on the AM band at 1330. The station took this idea to Schaack Electronics to see if they would sponsor three hours of this "stereo" broadcast experiment on Sunday nights, from nine to midnight, and they agreed. We tried to pick music that had the best left and right separation, so if you didn't play along and have two radios to blend both channels together the sound from just the AM or the FM broadcast would be muted. The stations stood to lose some audience due to the sound quality on a single band, but time was devoted to explaining what we were doing. Sunday nights were not prime time, anyway, and it was thought that the novelty outweighed the risk – but you'd have to be an active listener to get the full benefit of the experiment. Bryce devised a box that drew two channels of output from one turntable: left channel to AM, right channel to FM. Very unorthodox, but it worked. It had to be the first-ever stereo broadcast in the Twin Cities."

WLOL-FM was an early commercial classical music station in Minneapolis-St. Paul and was co-located with its AM sister. Jim Stokes, a WLOL announcer during that time (1330 AM had a talk format during his tenure), documented some of the period at the Davern Street location, 1972–75, in this commentary. WLOL-FM dropped classical and changed to "beautiful music" in mid-1973.

By 1977, WLOL was running country music, and switched to the WRRD call sign the following year, calling itself "The Big Red." In July 1979, the station flipped to a short-lived rock format branded as "13 Rock". This would be the station's final music format.

In January 1980, Minnesota Public Radio (MPR) purchased the station and changed the call letters to KSJN to correspond with its FM property, KSJN-FM. The purchase of the AM station was a fallback plan for MPR, which wanted to acquire a second FM signal in order to split KSJN-FM into separate talk and classical music stations; MPR had tried to acquire KBEM-FM a year earlier to achieve that goal. On October 9, 1989, the call letters were changed to KNOW and the station became the flagship for MPR's new news and information network.

WLOL-FM kept its call sign as it was sold to Emmis Broadcasting in 1983. The call letters enjoyed their biggest success when the station aired a Top 40 format from 1981 to 1991. The station remained popular until Jeff Smulyan, founder and CEO of Emmis, ran into financial problems shortly after purchasing the Seattle Mariners baseball team in 1989. Many of Emmis' radio properties were sold off as a result, and in December 1990, the company sold the 99.5 license to MPR for $12.5 million. MPR moved the KSJN calls and the classical music programming to 99.5 on March 11, 1991. MPR's 91.1 signal then became KNOW-FM, with talk and news programming full-time.

With two FM frequencies in the Twin Cities, MPR pondered other uses for 1330 AM. After four years of simulcasting KNOW-FM, it became WMNN in September 1995, the flagship of the commercial "Minnesota News Network." WMNN was sold in 2004 to Starboard Broadcasting, which converted it to Relevant Radio a Catholic religious format and soon restored the original WLOL call sign.

Former logo

Between 1991 and 2004, the WLOL call letters were used by several stations, including 1470 (now KMNQ), 100.3 (KFXN-FM), and 105.3 (WLUP). The call sign returned to its original home in 2004 (this time, however, it stands for "Our Lady of Lourdes", reflecting Relevant Radio's Catholic mission).

== See also ==
- WLOL-FM 99.5
- KDWB
- KSJN
- KNOW
- WLUP
- KMNQ
- KFXN-FM

== Sources ==
- 1941 WLOL brochure at Radiotapes.com
- Historical reference to 1954 applications for TV channel 9 by WDGY Radio and WLOL Radio, Box Office Magazine, April 24, 1954, page 71
- Broadcasting Yearbooks
- Retrieved from Glen Hauser's Shortwave/DX Report, January 29, 2004 on January 18, 2005
- (January 23, 2004). Minnesota Public Radio selling some operations. Associated Press.
- Nicole Garrison-Sprenger and Benno Groeneveld (January 19, 2004). MPR sells WMNN, Minnesota News Network for $10 million; Donor is disappointed. The Business Journal (Minneapolis-St. Paul)
- (January 24, 2004). Starboard does big: Buys major Twin Cities AM station from Minnesota Public Radio for $7 million.
