= KQRS-FM =

Classic rock radio station in Golden Valley, Minnesota

Coordinates: 45.058°N 93.124°W

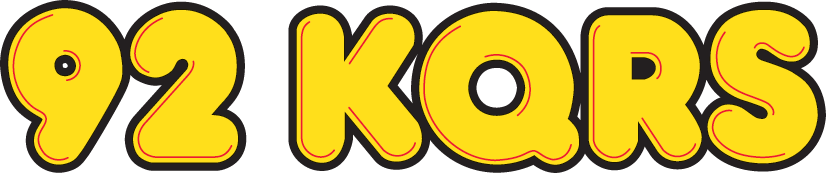
- Golden Valley, Minnesota; United States
- Broadcast area: Minneapolis-St. Paul
- Frequency: 92.5 MHz (HD Radio)
- RDS: PI: 3C0C; PS: Artist Title KQRS; RT: Artist - Title
- Branding: 92 KQRS

Programming
- Format: Mainstream rock
- Affiliations: Westwood One

Ownership
- Owner: Cumulus Media; (Radio License Holdings LLC)
- Sister stations: KXXR; WGVX; WWWM-FM; WLUP

History
- First air date: September 1, 1962 (as KEVE-FM)
- Former call signs: KEVE-FM (1962–1963); KADM (1963–1964)
- Call sign meaning: "Quality Radio Station"

Technical information
- Licensing authority: FCC
- Facility ID: 35505
- Class: C
- ERP: 100,000 watts
- HAAT: 315 m (1,033 ft)

Links
- Public license information: Public file; LMS
- Webcast: Listen live; Listen live (via iHeartRadio)
- Website: www.92kqrs.com

KQRS-FM (92.5 FM) is a radio station licensed to Golden Valley, Minnesota. Owned by Cumulus Media, it broadcasts a mainstream rock format serving the Minneapolis–Saint Paul market. Its studios are located in the Como district of Minneapolis, while it transmits from the KMSP-TV tower in Shoreview.

KQRS’s format is described as mainstream rock. It normally plays a lot of 1990s alternative rock along with some 2000s and 1980s alternative music, classic rock and music by Minnesota-based artists. KQRS was a classic rock station until 2025, when it relaunched to change to its current format.

== History ==
The original call letters were KEVE-FM and the station was co-owned with sister AM station KEVE (1440 AM). KEVE's AM history predates the FM by 14 years; it launched in May 1948, and was owned by Family Broadcasting until mid-1956 and was known until at least then as KEYD, co-owned with KEYD-TV (now KMSP-TV and launched by Family Broadcasting in January 1955). The KEYD Radio studios were located in downtown Minneapolis on 9th Street off of Hennepin Avenue adjacent to the Orpheum Theatre. The call sign was changed to KADM to complement its AM sister (as in "Adam and Eve") in October 1963. A gradual shift from country music to a mix of classical music, show tunes and adult standards began in 1960 and was completed on both stations by March 1963. On December 1, 1964, the call letters for both radio stations became KQRS. The KEVE studios had, by 1957, moved to its transmitter site in Golden Valley at 917 Lilac Drive, set back from Minnesota State Highway 100. This location was the first studio and transmitter site for the station.

The KQRS call sign stayed with the AM until 1982, when it switched to an oldies format as KGLD before returning to the simulcast and the KQRS calls less than two years later. In 1996, the AM was again split from the FM to become one of the first affiliates of Radio Disney, a format targeting children, as KDIZ. Both stations were owned by Disney at the time. In early 2001, KQRS and KDIZ (along with sister stations 93X and 105.1/105.3/105.7) moved their studios and offices to 2000 Elm Street SE in Minneapolis, near the University of Minnesota campus.

In the mid-1960s, KQRS programmed a middle-of-the-road MOR format with classical and big band music and Brazilian Bossa Nova music in evenings. In addition to this format, Joe Pyne's talk radio show was carried. In the summer of 1968, KQRS started experimenting with freeform rock in the late night hours with a program called "Nightwatch" with George Donaldson Fisher as DJ. This became very popular with college age listeners, and in a few months, the rock format was expanded to begin playing in the evenings as well with DJ Alan Stone, and was known as "Nightwatch Trip One", with Fisher's program renamed slightly as "Nightwatch Trip Two." A few months later, this became the primary full-time format.

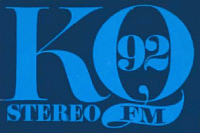
Historic KQRS logos

By 1977, the freeform rock would give way to a tightly programmed rock approach, courtesy of radio consultants Burkhart/Abrams and their "Superstars" format, which was essentially just the hits from album rock. This approach continued into 1986, with respectable, if not spectacular ratings, when KQRS signed a new consultant, Jacobs Media, and evolved into the popular classic rock format. That, coupled with its massively popular morning show, elevated KQRS to the top of the Minneapolis-St. Paul radio market ratings.

In 1994, KQRS had the distinction of unseating legendary area broadcaster WCCO (830 AM) as the most-listened-to station in the Minneapolis-St. Paul market (12+), an achievement which WCCO had held unchallenged for decades. The KQ92 Morning Show hosted by Tom Barnard was a major element in KQ's ascendance to the top spot, along with shifting market demographics. Barnard and the KQ Morning Show also were successful in holding the top rating spot when Howard Stern made his debut on the Twin Cities airwaves in 1997. Stern lasted only until mid-1999 in Minneapolis as his ratings brought him to the number two position in morning drive time, but the station that carried the show, WRQC, had poor ratings during the rest of the day, leading to the dropping of Stern and a format change. In 1997, morning show co-host Lee Siegfreid, known on air as Crazy Cabbie, was fired for a prank involving football player Brett Favre. Cabbie's prank involved him knocking on Favre's hotel door while the team was playing the Green Bay Packers. He claimed that a woman who wasn't Favre's wife answered the door. Siegfreid died in April 2024.

Rival KRXX, then known as "93X", was purchased by then-owners Capital Cities-ABC in the Spring of 1994, and the station's call sign was changed to KEGE with a new modern rock format. It primarily competed with the growing WGVX, though KQRS' parent company purchased the three REV signals in 1997. The stations went through several incarnations, including active rock, urban oldies and for the majority of the time, alternative rock, as well as Soft AC/oldies, adult contemporary, sports talk, and classic hip hop, before flipping back to Soft AC/oldies in late 2018 as Love 105.

With the three formats, Disney initially created what has been referred to in the industry as the "wall of rock". With the three formats covering different major rock genres, Disney dominated rock radio in the Twin Cities, and used 93X and Drive 105/Zone 105 as 'flankers' to ward off competitors trying to knock off KQRS, its station with the largest audience in the market and the company's local cash cow.

KQRS had been programmed by award-winning programming veteran (and former DJ) David Hamilton for over 25 years, until his retirement in December 2012. At that time, Cumulus appointed WZGC (Atlanta) Program Director Scott Jameson, who exited in January 2020.

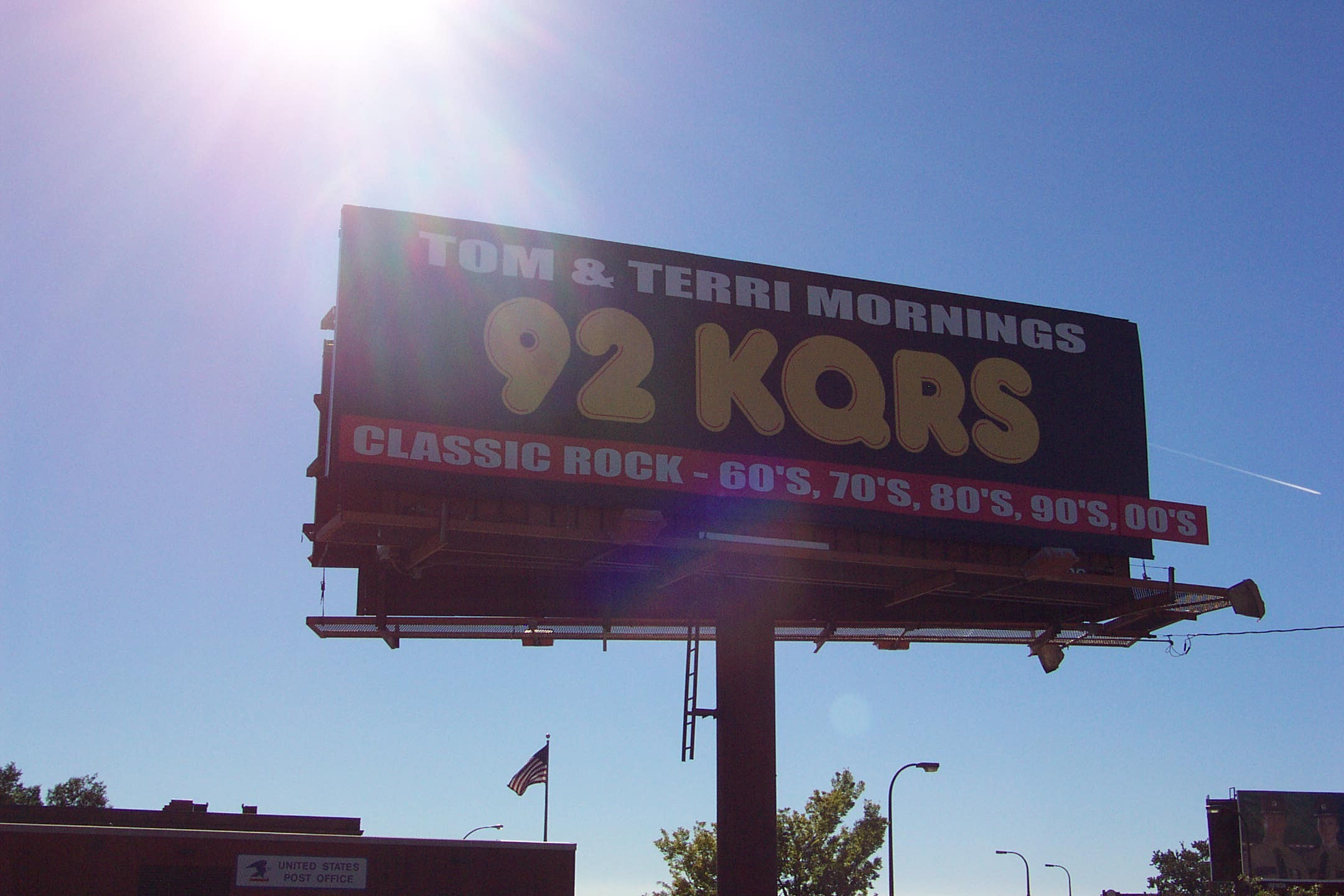
KQRS billboard c. 2005

In May 2005, KQRS began offering podcasts of the morning show through the station's website.

On June 1, 2007, Citadel Broadcasting closed on its purchase of ABC Radio, acquiring KQRS. KDIZ, the former KQRS 1440, was retained by Disney. Citadel merged with Cumulus Media on September 16, 2011.

Tom Barnard retired from the long-running morning show on December 23, 2022, replaced by former Black Crowes drummer Steve Gorman.

In late-March 2025, KQRS dismissed all of its on-air staff and began running jockless but still keeping the classic rock format. On the same day, it began promoting an impending relaunch on April 3. This came after layoffs within Cumulus's Minneapolis cluster, including morning host Brian Zepp; the only KQRS personality confirmed at that time to continue hosting was morning host Steve Gorman. Other factors included declining ratings (KQRS was tenth with a 4.1 share 6+ in the January 2025 Nielsen Audio Ratings), a need to attract a younger audience, and factors contributed by the retirement of longtime morning host Tom Barnard in 2022. On April 1 (April Fools Day) at 6am, after playing “Sultans Of Swing” by Dire Straits, KQRS dropped the classic rock format after almost 40 years and began stunting with loops of "Somebody to Shove" by Minneapolis-based Soul Asylum, and "It's the End of the World as We Know It (And I Feel Fine)" by R.E.M., while also running sweepers that included promoting the relaunch on April 3. Radio news outlet RadioInsight stated that Soul Asylum is more of an alternative rock band than classic rock and that hinted a possibility that KQRS could relaunch with an alternative rock-leaning format. The following day, KQRS quietly ended the stunt loop and returned with a classic alternative leaning playlist, but still running jockless and promoting the relaunch. The first song played in the updated playlist was “If You Leave” by OMD.

On April 3, KQRS officially launched its updated format; it carries a larger focus on rock hits from the 1980s through the early-2000s (with a particular emphasis on alternative rock and music by Minnesota-based acts) while still incorporating some classic rock material (such as The Rolling Stones). It also launched a new on-air lineup: Steve Gorman in the morning with and Ryder Bue remain in mornings along with co-host and former KTCZ-FM morning host Paul Fletcher who also is on middays, former KCMP music director and midday host Jade Tittle in afternoons, and Chris Nelson hosts the evenings. The first song during the relaunch was “Seven Nation Army” by The White Stripes. Program director James Kurdziel described the new format as targeting a Generation X audience he described as underserved by other Minneapolis stations, and "a fresh take on rock that speaks to their lives and passion".

== HD Radio ==
KQRS-FM began broadcasting an HD Radio signal in 2007. KQRS-FM also offered an HD2 channel featuring a classic country format branded as "The Bear".

On December 31, 2014, KQRS-FM ceased operation of its HD signal alongside sister station KXXR. KQRS-FM would begin HD operation full-time again two years later on December 31, 2016. "The Bear" did not return on KQRS-FM-HD2 immediately following reactivation of HD operation.

On June 27, 2018, "The Bear" returned to KQRS-FM-HD2 with a bigger emphasis on country golds from the 60s-2000s.

In January 2023, KQRS-FM ceased HD operation once again. HD operation on KQRS-FM would begin again in March 2023, however "The Bear" would not return to KQRS-FM-HD2.

== Pop culture ==
In the 1996 Christmas-themed movie Jingle All the Way, the character played by Arnold Schwarzenegger calls KQRS during a contest in an effort to win a rare toy doll for his son. He gets through and answers the question correctly only to find out he only won a gift certificate. The film is set in and was shot in the Twin Cities.
