= Michael Barone (radio host) =

American radio host

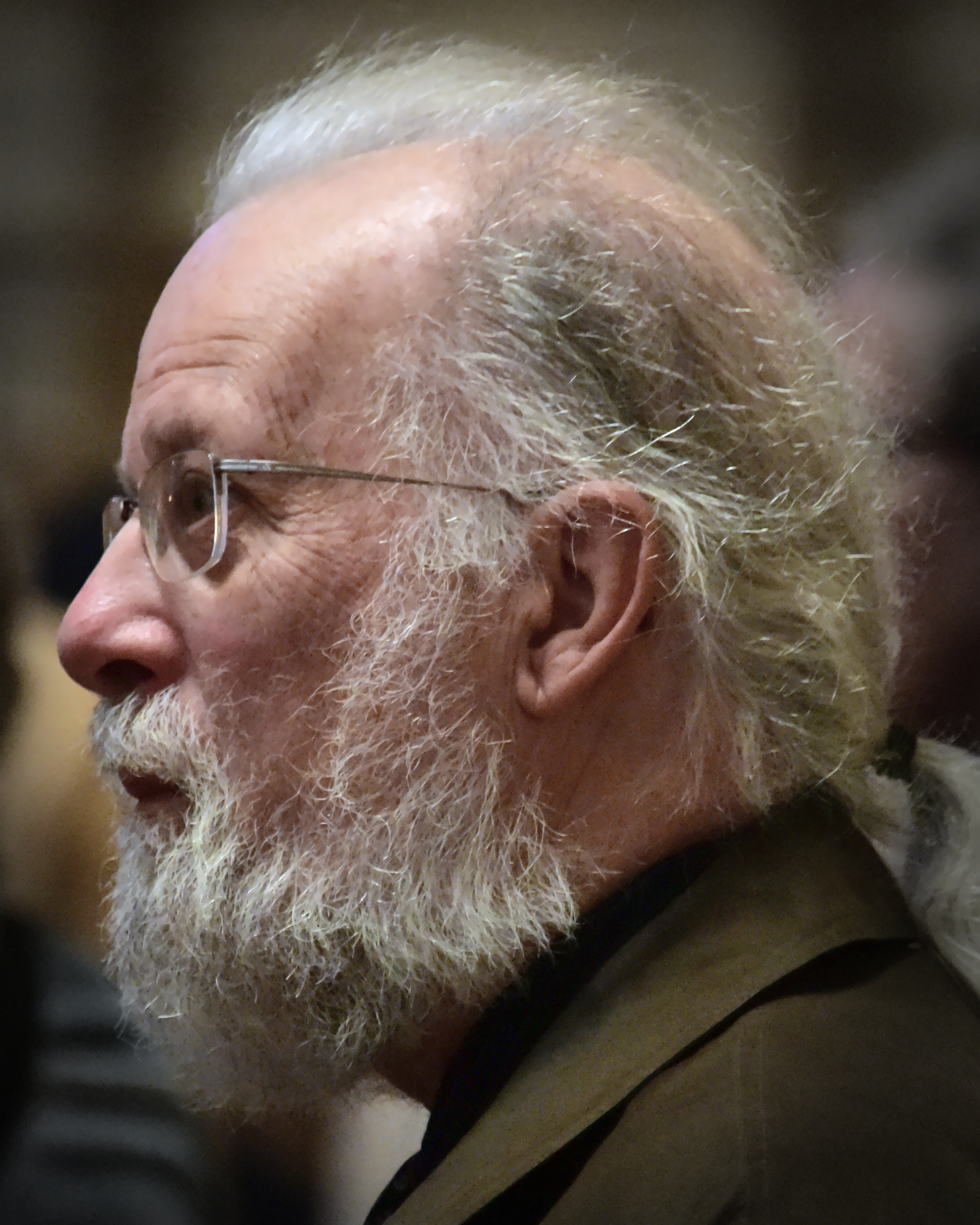

Background information
- Born: John Michael Barone; June 28, 1946 (age 80); Kingston, Pennsylvania
- Occupation: Radio host
- Instrument: Pipe organ
- Years active: 1968–present

John Michael Barone (born June 28, 1946) is an American organist, radio host, and producer, specializing in the pipe organ. His weekly program Pipedreams is distributed by American Public Media. He was the classical music director at Minnesota Public Radio (MPR) for 25 years and hosted broadcasts of the Saint Paul Chamber Orchestra and MPR's The New Releases.

== Biography ==
Barone's interest in organ music began in his teens, at first from listening to recordings. He then began playing at his hometown church in Kingston, Pennsylvania. He attended Oberlin College, worked at the student-run WOBC-FM radio station, and graduated from Oberlin Conservatory in 1968 with a degree in music history. He began his professional radio career as the music director of KSJR-FM at St. John's University in Collegeville, Minnesota. The station evolved into Minnesota Public Radio, where he served as classical music director for 25 years.

Beginning in 1970, Barone produced and hosted a weekly Sunday night broadcast of organ music, The Organ Program. In 1982, he created a 14-episode series of live performance recordings derived in large part from concerts during the 1980 National Convention of the American Guild of Organists (AGO). This "pilot" evolved into Pipedreams, which debuted in October 1983.

Barone was an adviser and consultant to the pipe organ installation at the Walt Disney Concert Hall in Los Angeles and has served as a program consultant to the organ series at the Kimmel Center for the Performing Arts in Philadelphia. He commissioned a cycle of preludes and fugues for organ from composer Henry Martin, which began to be published in 2008.

== Accolades ==
In 1996, Barone received the biennial AGO President's Award for "outstanding contributions to the art of the organ". In 1997, he received the Distinguished Service Award from the Organ Historical Society, of which he later served as president.

In 2001, Pipedreams received the American Society of Composers, Authors and Publishers' Deems Taylor Radio Broadcast Award for Excellence. Barone received a 2002 citation for his longevity and service to classical music in public radio. Also in 2002, he was inducted into the Minnesota Music Hall of Fame.

The AGO commissioned Haig Mardirosian to create a monograph on Barone published in 2017, the first in an AGO series.

In 2018, Barone was feted by colleagues on the 50th anniversary of his continuous employment at MPR and the 35th anniversary of the continuous weekly broadcast of Pipedreams in national distribution. These milestones were celebrated, in conjunction with the AGO's Twin Cities chapter, with a concert and reception at the Wooddale Church in Eden Prairie, Minnesota, involving eight local organists, one guest player, and the largest mechanical-action pipe organ in the Upper Midwest.

In 2023, for Barone's 55th and Pipedreams's 40th anniversaries, a program of music for organ and orchestra was mounted in Benson Great Hall at Bethel University, with its Blackinton pipe organ. Local soloists Stephen Self, Brenda Sevcik, Aaron David Miller, and Barone himself were featured in works by Samuel Barber, William Bolcom, Joseph Jongen, and Franz Liszt.

In 2025, Barone received the Oberlin College/Conservatory Alumni Association's Distinguished Achievement Award.
