= Steve Seel =

American DJ (born 1966)

- Born: December 3, 1966 (age 59); San Francisco, California
- Presenting career
- Show: classical music
- Station: Classical Minnesota Public Radio
- Time slot: Mondays - Wednesdays 7 p.m. - 12 a.m. CT
- Country: United States
- Website: minnesota.publicradio.org/about/people/sseel.shtml

Steve Seel (born December 3, 1966) is an American radio host for Classical Minnesota Public Radio in the Twin Cities, Minnesota. He is also a musician who performs under the moniker Dismantlists.

Seel began his radio career at WUSF in Tampa, Florida as a classical music DJ before moving to WNED-FM in Buffalo, NY where he hosted weekday afternoons and also created the experimental music program Present Tense. Seel joined Minnesota Public Radio in 1999 originally as a host for the nationally syndicated classical service Classical 24, a joint production of MPR and Public Radio International. From 2005 to 2015 he was a DJ for MPR's eclectic popular music station 89.3 The Current, including a period as co-host of The Current's Morning Show from 2008 to 2015 with DJ Jill Riley.

In 2015 Seel returned to Classical Minnesota Public Radio, where he began hosting weekday evenings (again heard nationally through MPR/PRI's Classical 24). He also originated the program Extra Eclectic, a showcase for 20th and 21st century classical music, also syndicated through Classical 24.

In 2012, Seel (under the pseudonym Guides) contributed an instrumental composition, "Flood," to the collection Die Welt ist Klang, a various-artists compilation in tribute to the German ambient musician Pete Namlook.

In 2018, Seel released a full album of minimalist instrumental music, now working under the name Dismantlists. The album, entitled "Here at the End," on his own imprint, Workshirt Recordings, featured "Flood" and eight additional tracks. All of the music was based heavily on Seel's solo guitar loops and drones. He described the album as "an expression of the feeling of living in apocalyptic times, when more and more of us experience the sensation of existing in a state of sustained uncertainty."
