= KSJU =

College radio station in Collegeville, Minnesota (1977–1988)

Collegeville, Minnesota; United States
- Frequency: 96.5 MHz

Programming
- Format: Variety

Ownership
- Owner: Saint John's University

History
- First air date: 1954 (carrier current); September 1977 (FM)
- Last air date: 1988 (FM)
- Former frequencies: 89.1 MHz (1977–1984)
- Call sign meaning: "Saint John's University"

Technical information
- Facility ID: 62125
- Class: D
- ERP: 10 watts
- Transmitter coordinates: 45°34′57″N 94°22′54″W

KSJU was a college radio station at the College of Saint Benedict and Saint John's University in Collegeville, Minnesota. Broadcasting as a carrier current AM radio station from 1954 to 1977 and on FM from 1977 to 1988, it was forced to drop its FM broadcasts due to the sign-on of new radio stations that held priority over its 10-watt facility. Today, the station operates online as "KJNB".

== History ==
=== Carrier current ===
Student radio at St. John's began in 1954 with the establishment of KSJU as a carrier-current radio station. In 1961, the station's music format eschewed rock and roll, opting for "adult college listening" and music for "study hours". The station's operations began to involve students from the College of St. Benedict in 1965 when five girls organized a group to incorporate the associated women's college into the production and broadcast of programming and the provision of news stories from St. Benedict into KSJU newscasts. 1970 brought KSJU a direct connection to the United Press International teletype.

=== On the FM dial, frequency changes and cable FM ===
St. John's applied for a construction permit for a new FM station in 1975. After receiving the permit in 1976, the station began transmitting on 89.1 FM for the 1977–78 school year, with a transmitter on Nequette Hill near the St. John's campus. The move to FM brought with it a doubling of KSJU's hours of operation. It marked the return of St. Johns to the FM dial, after having spun off public radio station KSJR-FM, which became the core of today's Minnesota Public Radio. (MPR celebrated its 25th anniversary in 1992 by broadcasting from the university's studios.) In April 1979, the station held a 70-hour marathon to raise the money necessary to convert to stereo broadcasting.

KSJU was a class D station for its entire existence as an FM broadcast station. Broadcasting with 10 watts, this made it a secondary service to other "full-service" radio stations. In the summer of 1984, KSJU relocated from 89.1 to 96.5 MHz, a move forced by the recent opening of applications for the 88.9 frequency, which became KNSR. The frequency change cost $7,000; simultaneously, the station was displaced from its auditorium studios by renovations, settling in Mary Hall.

The station operated on 96.5 MHz for four years before another radio station bumped it off the dial: the new station KKSR in Sartell, operating on 96.7 MHz. Though the university said it would look into the process of obtaining a new radio station license, this never occurred, with St. John's deciding to let the license lapse; instead, in an arrangement intended to be temporary, KSJU was placed as a cable FM channel on the local cable system, beginning December 1, 1988. The arrangement, however, carried a major drawback: the station was no longer listenable at St. Benedict and remained so for years, even though CSB students paid activity fees that supported its operations. In 1993, KSJU became "KJNB" ("Johnnies and Blazers"), reflecting its return to St. Benedict and in preparation for an attempt to return to the air with MPR backing. In 2000, another effort was made to return to the FM dial when the university filed for a low-power FM station. Low-power station applications were not initially required to protect stations on third-adjacent FM channels, but a law change in December 2000—after the original filing—required them to do so. After a remedial window, applicants for 484 proposed stations, including SJU, failed to modify their applications to address this deficiency, resulting in the dismissal of their applications in March 2003.
