= KNOW-FM =

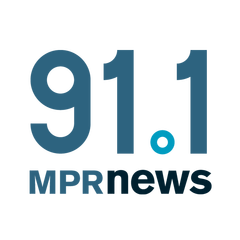

Saint Paul, Minnesota; United States
- Broadcast area: Minneapolis-Saint Paul
- Frequency: 91.1 MHz (HD Radio)
- RDS: PI: DDDF; PS: MPR News; RT: Program by Host
- Branding: Minnesota Public Radio News

Programming
- Format: Public Radio and talk
- Subchannels: HD2: "Radio Heartland" (Folk); HD3: BBC World Service
- Affiliations: National Public Radio; American Public Media; Public Radio Exchange; BBC World Service

Ownership
- Owner: Minnesota Public Radio
- Sister stations: KCMP; KSJN

History
- First air date: July 1, 1967
- Former call signs: KSJN (1967–1989)
- Call sign meaning: the word "know"

Technical information
- Licensing authority: FCC
- Facility ID: 42949
- Class: C0
- ERP: 100,000 watts
- HAAT: 388.5 meters (1,275 ft)
- Transmitter coordinates: 45°03′43.90″N 93°08′21.80″W

Links
- Public license information: Public file; LMS
- Webcast: Listen live
- Website: www.mprnews.org

KNOW-FM (91.1 MHz) is the flagship radio station of Minnesota Public Radio's news and information network. It is licensed to Saint Paul and serves the Minneapolis-Saint Paul radio market. The station is non-commercial and listener-supported. The studios are in the MPR Broadcast Center on Cedar Street in downtown Saint Paul.

KNOW-FM is a Class C0 FM station. It has an effective radiated power (ERP) of 100,000 watts, the maximum for most FM stations. The transmitter is on the Telefarm Towers in Shoreview.

== Programming ==
KNOW-FM carries a mix of local and national public radio news and information programs. On weekdays, it airs Morning Edition, All Things Considered, Fresh Air, 1A, On Point, The World, Marketplace and from the Canadian Broadcasting Corporation, it runs As It Happens. At noon, a local news and interview show is heard, Minnesota Now. The MPR staff anchors frequent news updates throughout the day, along with an hour of local news at 9 a.m.

On weekends, specialty shows are heard. They include The Moth Radio Hour, Reveal, The Splendid Table, Latino USA, On The Media, Freakonomics Radio, This Old House Radio Hour, The New Yorker Radio Hour, This American Life, Radiolab, Hidden Brain, It's Been A Minute, Snap Judgement, Live Wire and Wait, Wait, Don't Tell Me. The BBC World Service runs all night.

KNOW-FM broadcasts using HD Radio technology. Its HD2 digital subchannel offers "Radio Heartland," a folk and Americana music service. HD3 carries the BBC World Service.

== History ==
=== KSJN-FM ===
The station signed on the air on July 1, 1967. Its original call sign was KSJN-FM. It was owned by Saint John's University, with the call letters standing for St. John. It was powered at 16,500 watts, a fraction of its current output. The university also owned a station near its home base of St. Cloud, 90.1 KSJR-FM. Trying to run two radio stations was difficult for the Catholic university. It transferred both stations to a non-profit organization that later became Minnesota Public Radio.

In 1980, Minnesota Public Radio purchased an AM radio station at 1330 kHz, WLOL. MPR changed its call sign to KSJN and used it to simulcast its FM sister station, 91.1 KSJN-FM. MPR was already making plans to run two different networks of programming when it bought the AM frequency. In that era, 91.1 KSJN-FM had to serve two audiences at the same time. It offered NPR news and information shows in morning and afternoon drive time, with mostly classical music in middays, nights and weekends.

=== KNOW-FM ===
In 1989, KSJN-AM changed its call letters to KNOW, to stand for the word "know." It began airing an expanded lineup of NPR programming, including shows that were not available on the FM's schedule. Two years later, MPR bought 99.5 FM-–the former WLOL-FM. With that acquisition, MPR moved the KNOW call letters and informational programming to 91.1, while the KSJN-FM call sign moved to 99.5 as a full-time classical music station. The AM signal was later spun off into a for-profit subsidiary to help fund the public broadcaster, and was eventually sold. That station has since returned to using the WLOL call sign and it airs Catholic religious programming.

With MPR's two FM frequencies in the Minneapolis-St. Paul market, listeners can choose between news and information on 91.1 KNOW-FM and classical music on 99.5 KSJN-FM. A third station in the area was also acquired by MPR, 89.3 KCMP in Northfield, which plays adult album alternative (Triple-A) music.

=== Quadrophonic stereo and call sign history ===
In the 1970s, KSJN 91.1 FM and WLOL (99.5 FM) cooperated in an experimental use of quadraphonic stereo, with each station carrying two channels of audio. However, this "quadcast" had some undesirable "ping-pong" effects. As KNOW now mainly broadcasts spoken word programming, the station broadcasts in analog, using monaural audio, to help extend the station's coverage.

The call sign KNOW was once used by an adult contemporary radio station in Austin, Texas, at 1490 AM. The station signed off in 1989 after operating for 50 years. The KNOW call letters were also used by an oldies station in Lufkin, Texas, at 1420 AM. A fire forced it to shut down in 1987.

== HD Radio ==
KNOW-FM broadcasts using HD Radio technology. Its HD2 digital subchannel is "Radio Heartland." It has a playlist of acoustic, singer-songwriter, folk and Americana music. The service launched in December 2008.

Radio Heartland's schedule also includes the programs American Routes from American Public Media as well as The Thistle & Shamrock and Mountain Stage from NPR. These additional shows were added to Radio Heartland's schedule in November 2009.

The HD3 subchannel airs the BBC World Service around the clock.

== See also ==
- KCMP, MPR's eclectic music station
- KSJN, MPR's classical music station
