= Pipedreams =

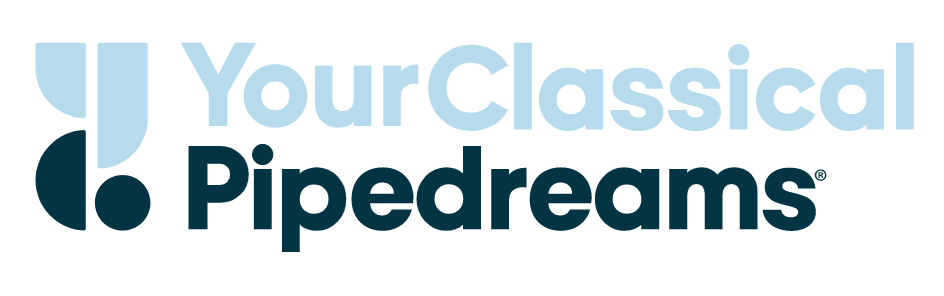
- Genre: Classical music
- Running time: 2 hours
- Country of origin: United States
- Language(s): English
- Home station: Minnesota Public Radio
- Syndicates: American Public Media
- Hosted by: J. Michael Barone
- Original release: January 3, 1982 – present
- Website: www.pipedreams.org

Pipedreams is a radio music program produced and distributed by American Public Media (APM) based in Saint Paul, Minnesota, created and hosted since its inception by J. Michael Barone. Each one- or two-hour show features organ music, and centers on a theme such as a particular instrument, venue, organ builder, performer, composer, period, etc.

== History ==
The program has been in weekly national broadcast syndication since 1983 (following pilot episodes in 1982), and it remains the only nationally syndicated radio program in the United States devoted to organ music. The program is available on APM-affiliated stations and on the Pipedreams.org website. In recent years, Pipedreams' weekly radio audience has fluctuated around 200,000 listeners. The program's major sponsors include the Associated Pipe Organ Builders of America.

In addition to the radio program itself, Pipedreams is also known for producing guided tours, often to Europe with the objective of visiting organs of unique quality or interest. Recordings of these notable instruments are frequently featured in the broadcasts of Pipedreams.

== Accolades ==
The program's major accolades include the 2001 Deems Taylor Radio Broadcast Award for Excellence from the American Society of Composers, Authors and Publishers. In 2017, the American Guild of Organists commissioned a monograph series and published its inaugural volume, J. Michael Barone and Pipedreams: The Organ on Public Radio, by Haig Mardirosian.

== In popular culture ==
The program was referenced on Episode 116 (Santa Claus) of the cult TV series Mystery Science Theater 3000 in 1993.
