= John Hines =

John or Johnny Hines may refer to:

== Military ==
- John L. Hines (1868–1968), Chief of Staff of the US Army
- John Hines (Australian soldier) (1878–1958), British-born Australian soldier during World War I
- John L. Hines Jr. (1905–1986), officer in the United States Army

== Sports ==
- John Hines (baseball) (1901–1967), American Negro league baseball player
- John Hines (boxer) (1912–1966), American boxer
- John Hines (NASCAR owner) (fl. 1960s), former NASCAR race car owner

== Others ==
- John Hines (missionary) (1850–1931), English missionary working in Canada
- Johnny Hines (1895–1970), American actor
- John E. Hines (1910–1997), Episcopal bishop in America
- John Hines (Wyoming politician) (1936–2024), State Senator
- John Hines (Mississippi politician) (born 1966), member of the Mississippi House of Representatives
- John Hines (radio broadcaster) (born 1953), radio broadcaster in Minneapolis-St. Paul

== See also ==
- John Hine (disambiguation)
- John Heinz (1938–1991), American businessman and politician
