= WGGL-FM =

Minnesota Public Radio station in Houghton, Michigan

Coordinates: 47.035°N 88.695°W

- Houghton, Michigan; United States
- Broadcast area
- Frequency: 91.1 MHz
- Branding: Minnesota Public Radio

Programming
- Format: Classical, news/talk
- Affiliations: NPR

Ownership
- Owner: Minnesota Public Radio

History
- First air date: 1968

Technical information
- Licensing authority: FCC
- Facility ID: 42913
- Class: C1
- ERP: 100,000 watts
- HAAT: 262 meters
- Translator: 92.7 W224AO (Houghton)

Links
- Public license information: Public file; LMS
- Website: WGGL Online

WGGL-FM (91.1 FM) is an NPR member station in Houghton, Michigan. It first began broadcasting in 1968 and has been owned and operated by Minnesota Public Radio since 1982. It carries a mix of classical music and NPR news-talk programming, running a schedule similar to what MPR ran before its 1991 split into a two-channel network.

WGGL began operations on March 28, 1968, as a ten-watt station owned and operated by Michigan Technological University. The initial programming schedule ran for only five hours a day (4 to 9 p.m.) five days a week (soon expanded to six with the addition of Sunday programming). It shut down during summer vacations and school holidays. Programming was an entirely locally originating hybrid of classical, jazz and folk music along with local interest programming. WGGL increased power to 250 watts in late 1969 and then to 100,000 watts in 1971; by then, the station had affiliated with the then-fledgling NPR.

WGGL attracted a fairly loyal following, although it served a very small market; there were just barely enough listeners for it to be viable as a standalone NPR station. However, by the start of the 1980s, WGGL was on the verge of being shut down due to budget cuts. Bill Kling of Minnesota Public Radio stepped in to buy the station from Michigan Tech in 1982. Since then, the station has mostly aired classical music and NPR programming fed from St. Paul, time-shifted for the Eastern Time Zone (MPR is based in the Central Time Zone). For some time, MPR still maintained a studio at Michigan Tech's campus in Houghton, producing a few hours per week of local programming. As of 2021, there is no studio space in Houghton and all programming is fed over satellite or from MPR to the station's transmitter site outside of town.

In December 2012, WGGL modified its schedule to include more NPR news and talk programming. The station's midday classical music block was cut down to 12 noon to 2 p.m., and new offerings included On Point with Tom Ashbrook, two hours of BBC Newshour, and Talk of the Nation, in addition to the already-running Morning Edition, All Things Considered, Fresh Air, and Marketplace. Classical music remains on the schedule during evenings and overnights.

== Translator ==
Broadcast translator for WGGL-FM
Call sign	Frequency	City of license	FID	ERP (W)	Class	FCC info
W224AO	92.7 FM	Houghton, Michigan	42928	250	D	LMS
