= John Hine (disambiguation) =

John Hine is a Catholic bishop.

John Hine is also the name of:

- John Hine (bishop of Grantham), Anglican bishop
- John Hine (footballer), English footballer
- John Bird Hine, New Zealand politician

== See also ==
- John Hines (disambiguation)
