= Calibre Press =

US law enforcement training company

Calibre Press is a company that specializes in providing training for law enforcement officers in the United States.

The organization is currently owned by a former police lieutenant who assumed control in 2012.

== Overview ==
Over its 40-year history, Calibre Press has trained over one million officers across the United States. The company offers training programs tailored for Federal, State, Local, and Tribal Law Enforcement agencies. The topics covered in Calibre's courses encompass a wide range, including de-escalation techniques, strategic communication, leadership development, and emotional wellness.

In addition to its training programs, Calibre Press also publishes a weekly newsletter specifically for law enforcement professionals. This newsletter provides information and updates for the law enforcement community. Furthermore, Calibre Press has released several training books that serve as educational resources for law enforcement officers, covering various topics related to policing and officer development.

Calibre Press has collaborated with numerous journalists and media outlets to enhance public awareness of law enforcement issues. Their partnerships have included working with organizations such as National Public Radio (NPR), Minnesota Public Radio, Bloomberg, The New York Times, as well as numerous local affiliates. Through these collaborations, Calibre Press aims to contribute to the broader discussion surrounding law enforcement matters and promote a better understanding of the challenges faced by law enforcement professionals.
