= Baulu Kuan =

Chinese-American artist and curator (born 1930)

Baulu Kuan (born 1930) is a Chinese-American artist and curator.

== Biography ==
Baulu Kuan was born in Northern China in the 1930 and named Neihan Kuan by her father. She was born and raised in the traditions of Confucianism, Daoism, and Buddhism. She was raised in an intellectual family that encouraged the practice of traditional calligraphy and painting. Kuan's family was also the conduit to her finding Catholicism because they would bring her and her siblings to Catholic missionary hospitals if they were sick and sent them to Catholic school. Kuan admired the nuns and their free will to enter monastic life and so in 1948, Neihan Kuan left China and went to Taiwan where she met the Benedictine Sisters, entered the monastery, and became Baulu Kuan, OSB. Later in the 1950s she moved to the Saint Benedict's Monastery in St. Joseph, Minnesota where she currently resides.

=== Art work ===
In her undergraduate schooling at the College of St. Benedict, Kuan pursued a double major in art and literature and a minor in education. She worked closely under her mentor, colleague, and friend, Sister Thomas Carey, who largely influenced Kuan's art. Later she completed her master's thesis in painting in June 1968 at the University of Iowa with the piece, Interior Portrait. She worked in the many artistic styles that took hold in popularity throughout her life: fauvism, cubism, and abstract expressionism. She also made many traditional Chinese ink drawings and woodblock prints. Her work interacts with her unique background as a Chinese-American Catholic nun, containing many elements Eastern aesthetics with Western biblical themes.

=== Teaching ===
In Minnesota, Kuan taught high school students in St. Cloud and Cold Spring. Later after pursuing her masters, she taught Studio Art and Art History for 34 years at the College of St. Benedict. She did much of her scholarship and study on non-western art under the guidance of Sister Mary David Olheiser, Dean, with the goal of establishing more courses in non-western areas. She also received numerous grants and fellowships from Harvard, Yale, and Santa Barbara, allowing her to travel and take students on study trips to learn about art and culture around the globe including Mesoamerica, New Guinea, West Africa, China, Tibet, and Europe. In the 1980s when China re-opened its borders to travel, Kuan led her first of many archaeology trips there. Through study and teaching abroad in China, Kuan forged the strong relationship between Southwest University in China and the College of St. Benedict and St. Johns University, which remains today. In February 1997, Kuan attended the College Art Association (CAA) Conference in New York which was exploring issues in non-western art. Some of the topics on discussion that year were: "The Problematics of East and West," "Making Asian Art History: Principles of Comparison Between Chinese and Western Painting," and "Modern or Chinese: Revival of Tradition at the Age of Modernism."

=== Collecting ===
While on her travels and study abroad trips, Baulu Kuan collected many artifacts around the world. In 1971 in the West African nations of Senegal, Gabon, Benin, Togo, Nigeria, and the Ivory Coast she collected masks, textiles, jewelry, and statues. In 1973 Baulu Kuan and Caprician Weaver, OSB traveled to New Guinea to study the area's art and anthropology. Here they traversed the land via many traditional and local modes of transportation like tree-hollowed boats, thatched stretchers, outrigger canoes, bush plane, and by foot. Here they collected grass skirts, masks, and various wood carvings. Baulu Kuan has also collected art and artifacts from China, West Africa, and Mesoamerica while leading study abroad trips and teaching abroad. These collected artifacts are kept in the permanent collection at the College of St. Benedict and the Benedictine Monastery.

=== Curating ===
Baulu Kuan OSB has also curated exhibitions and published art books throughout her life. Baulu Kuan and Nancy Hynes wrote the book Sister Thomas Carey, O.S.B. : the Light Within published in 2003 which presents collected writings about and imagery of the art of Sister Thomas Carey O.S.B. Kuan presented her own show, A Lifetime Pursuit: Journeying into the art of Baulu Kuan, OSB, in the Heahn Museum Gallery at the College of St. Benedict Monastery from April 30, 2017 to December 23, 2017. This show was a retrospective of her own art, her students' art, works of art and artifacts she collected during her travels, and photographs she took on these trips. Later that year she curated the show, A Lifetime Pursuit Continues presented in the Gorecki Gallery and Gallery Lounge at the College of St. Benedict from November 6, 2017 to January 7, 2018. This show featured art by former colleagues and students, some of whom are internationally known, and also a few of her own works as well. These works ranged from ink drawings, scrolls, traditional woodblock prints, paintings, and sculptural works. Also included in the show was a collection of traditional Chinese art tools such as brushes and stamps and their cases.
