= Michael Crouser =

American photographer (born 1962)

- Born: December 27, 1962 (age 63)
- Education: Saint John's University - Collegeville, Minnesota
- Occupation: Fine art photographer
- Writing career
- Notable works: Photography monographs Los Toros, Dog Run and Mountain Ranch
- Notable awards: George Eastman / Power of the Image Award 2014, 1st Prize in Fine Art Books at the 2008 International Photography Awards for Los Toros
- Website: www.michaelcrouser.com

Michael Crouser (born 1962) is an American fine art and commercial photographer best known for his black and white photographs that merge fine art and documentary imagery.

== Biography ==
Los Toros (Twin Palms Publishers 2007), Crouser's first monograph, was awarded first prize in the Fine Art Book category at the 2008 International Photography Awards, and his prints can be found in the permanent collections of the Minneapolis Institute of Art and the Museum of Fine Arts, Houston. In 2012 Leica Gallery of New York City presented Michael Crouser: A Mid-Career Retrospective, featuring the work of four distinct series from 25 years of photographs. Crouser eschews digital methods in his work, preferring Tri-X film and the traditional darkroom. He currently divides his time between his hometown of Minneapolis, Minnesota, and Brooklyn, New York.

== Los Toros ==
Crouser's seminal work resulted from fifteen years of photographing bullfights in Spain, Mexico, South America and France. He shot 900 rolls of film on this project, and then spent a year-and-a-half in the darkroom developing his diffused, toned, trademark style. He then spent six additional years shooting bullfighting scenes with this unique style in mind, finishing the shooting for this project in 2001. Twin Palms published his critically acclaimed, award-winning monograph Los Toros, with an introduction by Nobel Prize winner Mario Vargas Llosa, in 2007.

== Dog Run ==
Called by Toronto's The Globe and Mail "perhaps the least sentimental book of dog photos ever printed," Crouser's second monograph, Dog Run (Viking Studio, 2008), is an exploration of canine pets and how they act outside in the influence of their owners. The book was photographed over the course of three years in Manhattan's Tompkins Square Park Dog Run and in Minneapolis, at the Lake of the Isles Dog Park.

== Sin Tiempo ==
The Spanish translation for "without time", this ongoing project (1986–present) seeks the chance crossings of certain moments, faces, setting and vignettes that exhibit no evidence of popular culture or elements, which would fix the images in a specific time.

== Mountain Ranch ==
Crouser's most recent series; an exploration of the disappearing world of Colorado cattle ranchers, published as a book by the University of Texas Press in 2017.
