= Classical 24 =

Syndicated classical music public radio service

Classical 24 is a syndicated, satellite-delivered public radio service providing classical music to its carrying stations. It generally airs overnights on many non-commercial and a handful of commercial classical music stations. However, the service is operated 24 hours a day and is used by some stations during the day to augment their schedules. It was co-created by a partnership between Minnesota Public Radio and Public Radio International to fulfill the need for a comprehensive classical music service for stations to supplement their schedules. As part of this partnership, the service is produced by American Public Media and since 2018, is distributed by Public Radio Exchange. It began operation on December 1, 1995.

Unlike most mainstream classical music stations, Classical 24 adheres to a "clock" that typically consists of one or two short selections at the beginning of the hour, followed by a longer work such as a symphony, and then a short piece or two to close the hour. A brief pre-recorded "sound bite" interview with the composer, conductor or soloist of the next piece is sometimes played immediately prior to the piece, as an introduction.

Classical 24 also requires two breaks per hour during the day at around 20 and 40 minutes past (one per hour during the overnight Music Through the Night component) and a mandatory break at the top of the hour for announcements and station identification. The service also has a five-minute "cutaway" following this top of the hour break during the day for subscribers to air news programming (in many cases the standard NPR newscast, as some NPR member stations air Classical 24); this time is filled with a short musical selection for affiliates who choose not to run any newscast.

Classical 24 employs live hosts around the clock instead of using voicetracking. To make the sound as "local" as possible, there are no identifications given to the listener that they are listening to Classical 24. Only the host's name is given. For stations to automate breaks, a special decoder must be purchased and used.

In 2000, the Minneapolis Star Tribune reported that the average selection on Classical 24 was 9.5 minutes, in contrast to then-rival WCAL's average selection length of 15 minutes.

Minnesota Public Radio's FM flagship station for classical music, KSJN in Minneapolis, currently offers a full-time Classical 24 feed on its HD2 sub-channel. WNIU, broadcasting from Northern Illinois University in DeKalb, Illinois, is another full power FM that carries Classical 24 on a full-time basis. After November 2013, KUHA (now KHVU) in Houston (broadcasting from the University of Houston at the time) carried Classical 24 for a significantly increased portion of its schedule after discontinuing the use of local hosts during the daytime hours. Wisconsin Public Radio partially syndicates Classical 24 on the WPR Music network overnight and weekends. A Classical 24 stream, branded as "YourClassical Radio", is also available on MPR's YourClassical website.

== On-air hosts ==
Classical 24 has three daypart-separated teams of ten different hosts which present 4-hour/6-hour live air shifts:

=== Music Through the Night hosts ===
- Jillene Khan
- Melanie Renate

=== Daytime ===
- John Birge
- Vernon Neal
- Kevin O'Connor
- Lynne Warfel
- Melissa Ousley
- Steve Staruch
- Mindy Ratner
- Bonnie North

=== Evenings ===
- Steve Seel
- Scott Blankenship
- Jake Armerding
- Valerie Kahler

=== Fill-in ===
These presenters can be heard on a weekly basis in numerous short segments or as fill-in hosts:

- Jeff Esworthy
- Ward Jacobson
- Liz Lyon (Assistant Program Director)
- Julie Amacher (The Network's Program Director)

== Music Through the Night ==
Music Through the Night is a classical music radio program produced by American Public Media and distributed by Public Radio International, and broadcast on many National Public Radio (NPR) stations as well as several other classical music stations, generally from midnight to 6 a.m. Central Time every night, though beginning and ending times might vary.

=== Background ===
According to a Time Magazine article first published in 1952, Music Through the Night got its original incarnation when Civil Defense authorities asked Ted Cott of Manhattan's WNBC (660) radio to keep a radio tone signal playing all night so as to be immediately able to send out important public announcements. He elected to try an all-classical music program instead, and the program proved popular.

Today's incarnation is provided by Classical 24 and is hosted primarily by Minnesota Public Radio's Jillene Khan and new host Melanie Renate. According to promotional materials, "Seven days a week, this program offers a choice of music and style of presentation perfectly suited for through-the-night listening. The program mixes standard repertoire with the finest works by lesser-known composers to lend perspective to major musical figures." The all-day Classical 24 format generally follows the Music Through the Night format with some modifications.

=== Format ===
The program begins at the top of each hour with a brief introduction by the host to the featured musical selection (which can run up to 10 minutes or longer) to be played later during the hour. A shorter musical selection follows for five minutes (some stations preempt this for the standard top-of-the-hour NPR newscast), and then four to six other selections, one or two of these being the featured selection(s) of the hour, which are longer in duration. A shorter selection often concludes the hour.

The host briefly introduces each selection, stating the name of the piece, its composer, the orchestra (or soloist if applicable) and conductor of the selection, and sometimes providing a brief anecdotal or historical note of interest about the piece or composer.

Before some of the pieces, a brief pre-recorded "sound bite" interview with the composer, conductor or principal soloist of that piece is introduced by the host, to give some perspective on the selection being played.

The host will sometimes read one or two brief national, international or business news headlines in between selections, especially towards the top of the hour, and as the morning hours approach (in the Eastern time zone). At the top of the 6 a.m. hour (Central time), the two-minute program Composers Datebook, hosted by John Birge (pre-recorded and syndicated separately by American Public Media), is played as part of the Music Through the Night/Classical 24 playlist for the hour.

Different affiliates end their Music Through the Night coverage at different times in the morning to begin their broadcast day with local announcers; a handful present the entire Classical 24 schedule, including Music Through the Night, with no local hosts. Some affiliates present the entire Classical 24 schedule via additional digital radio channels or internet streaming. The Classical 24 playlist is publicly available as much as 10 days in advance at the webpage https://www.classical24.org/?display=true&source=C24 .

While works from Modern and even a few contemporary composers are presented, most of the programming typically specializes in Classical and Romantic composition; while music from these periods is available on daytime programming in some markets, few shows specialize like Music Through the Night.

=== First Black host terminated ===
Garrett McQueen, the Classical 24 overnight host and its only Black host, was employed by Minnesota Public Radio when he was terminated on September 10, 2020, for "not following programming guidelines." McQueen "was taken off the air after his shift on Aug. 25" and "given two warnings — one of which was about his need to improve communication and the other warning was for switching out scheduled music to play pieces he felt were more appropriate to the moment and more diverse," according to McQueen.

Minnesota Public Radio and its larger sister organization American Public Media (APM) co-produced Classical 24. Minnesota Public Radio President Duchesne Drew and APM President Dave Kansas wrote in a statement published on September 11, 2020, that previous warnings were tied to his departure, not his music choices or his "unauthorized changes to playlists." They claim it was the manner in which he made the changes, not the actual content, which were a direct response to the murder of George Floyd in the custody of the Minneapolis Police Department. The video of Floyd's murder prompted both local and international protests in the name of Black Lives Matter despite shelter-in-place orders during the 2020 global COVID-19 pandemic. In posts on his social media accounts, Garrett claimed that his playlist changes were a direct response to the national events and that the audience welcomed his changes:

"When things happened in the news or when there were hours of programming that only represented dead white men, I would take it upon myself to change that," said McQueen. "That always got lots of really positive feedback, but it's not exactly what protocol calls for."

Yet, the collective statement from executives at MPR and APM emphasized that McQueen's departure was due to other concerns:

We have a process in place for changing playlists, and that process exists to maintain our more than 200 partner stations' compliance with the Digital Millennium Copyright Act and to ensure royalties are properly paid for the music played.

McQueen felt his departure was prompted by his direct on-air response to local protests:

"And let's just face it," said McQueen, "with [the murder of] George Floyd and all of those things, there was a lot of pressure for me to engage the audience while that's happening. I'm on the air, literally while the 3rd Precinct is being burned down. So, it's my responsibility to make sure that the [classical] programming spoke to that and that's what I did."

McQueen is a professional bassoonist, whose classical playlists reflected a "deep knowledge of the history behind classical music," given the problematic under-representation of Black composers and musicians in the field of recorded classical music and staged performance. He had played a significant role since 2018 to diversify the station's programming. MPR and APM stated that they "remain steadfast in pursuing that commitment," highlighting in bold:

Across Classical MPR, 24 percent of the music we play features a composer, conductor or soloist who is a woman and/or a Black person, Indigenous person, or Person of Color. We are committed to increasing this number.

As of early 2021, McQueen continued to co-host Trilloquy, an independent podcast co-created with MPR classical music host Scott Blankenship, which discusses classical music's role "in the fight against police brutality, anti-racism, and more."
