= KSJN =

Classical radio station in Minneapolis

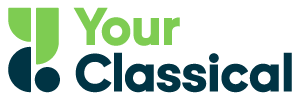
- Minneapolis, Minnesota; United States
- Broadcast area: Minneapolis–Saint Paul
- Frequency: 99.5 MHz (HD Radio)
- Branding: YourClassical MPR

Programming
- Format: Classical music
- Subchannels: HD2: Classical 24
- Affiliations: NPR

Ownership
- Owner: Minnesota Public Radio
- Sister stations: KCMP; KNOW-FM

History
- First air date: February 1957
- Former call signs: WLOL-FM (1957–1991)
- Call sign meaning: Variation of sister station KSJR-FM in St. Cloud

Technical information
- Licensing authority: FCC
- Facility ID: 42911
- Class: C
- ERP: 100,000 watts
- HAAT: 315 meters (1,033 ft)
- Transmitter coordinates: 45°03′29.90″N 93°07′27.80″W
- Translator: 91.9 K220JP (Minneapolis)

Links
- Public license information: Public file; LMS
- Webcast: Listen live
- Website: www.yourclassical.org/mpr

KSJN (99.5 FM) is a non-commercial educational radio station licensed to Minneapolis, Minnesota. Owned by Minnesota Public Radio (MPR), this station serves the Twin Cities region as the flagship of "YourClassical MPR", MPR's classical music network. KSJN's studios are located at the MPR Broadcast Center on Cedar Street in downtown Saint Paul, while its transmitter is located on the KMSP Tower in Shoreview. KSJN broadcasts using HD Radio technology, and uses its HD2 subchannel to carry American Public Media's Classical 24 network.

The 99.5 frequency was established as commercial radio station WLOL-FM in 1957; the station achieved its most success as a top-rated Top 40 station during the 1980s under Emmis Communications ownership. After Emmis purchased the Seattle Mariners baseball club, the company sold WLOL to MPR in 1991. Relaunched as KSJN, the station has originated the public radio service's classical format full-time ever since.

== History ==
=== Classical and easy listening ===
On July 18, 1956, radio station WLOL (1330 AM) was granted a construction permit for a new FM radio station to be heard on 99.5 MHz. The station, WLOL-FM, began broadcasting in February 1957 with a classical music format. The station maintained this programming for its first 16 years of operation until the money-losing outlet switched to automated beautiful music in August 1973. The station donated its classical albums to KSJN (91.1 FM) and KUOM.

The easy listening format proved to be popular as more people acquired FM receivers and offices played WLOL-FM for their employees and visitors. The station aired quarter-hour sweeps of soft instrumental music as well as Broadway and Hollywood show tunes.

=== Adult contemporary ===
The competition in the easy listening format was evident in the Twin Cities. Other stations in the format at the time included KEEY-FM and WAYL AM-FM (now KKMS and KXXR). Midcontinent Broadcasting sold WLOL-AM-FM to Bob Liggett of Liggett Broadcasting for $1.55 million in 1978. On August 20, Liggett, with a staff of nine disc jockeys, debuted a new soft adult contemporary station as Easy Rockin' FM 100 WLOL. The flip brought WLOL-FM into competition with KSTP-FM and WCCO-FM (now KMNB). Ratings rose, but the station remained far off its direct competition.

=== Top 40/CHR era ===
On December 12, 1981, WLOL-FM changed formats again, this time to Top 40/CHR as 99½ WLOL. The ratings effect was quick to take hold; in the spring 1982 Arbitron survey, WLOL-FM more than doubled its performance and vaulted into third place in the Twin Cities, led by the revamped "Hines and Berglund" morning show hosted by John Hines and Bob Berglund.

Even while WLOL was surging, a sale was in the works. In 1982, an Indianapolis-based consortium headed by Jeff Smulyan acquired WLOL-FM for $6 million, a record price at the time for a Minnesota radio station. It was the first station purchase for Emmis Communications, which then bought two more stations the next year. The station peaked in the ratings in 1984 with a 9.9 share, closely behind second-place KSTP-FM and well ahead of direct format competitor KDWB. WLOL and KDWB would go on to have a bitter rivalry throughout the 1980s, with WLOL dominating the format in the Twin Cities for the next five years.

WLOL was noteworthy for its presentation, by combining typical Top 40 programming philosophies with a local touch. In addition, WLOL relied heavily on unique jingle packages, including the now iconic "Get Me Up!" jingle, which was written by Kyrl Henderson of the now defunct Reel Good Productions, and was distributed to stations across the country. Local artists such as Prince & The Revolution, Morris Day & The Time, Information Society, Alexander O'Neal and The Jets all received support from WLOL.

By the late 1980s, the tables were turned. After KDWB updated its on-air presentation in 1988, some listeners felt WLOL had grown stale, while KDWB suddenly became the hip new CHR station. KDWB and its morning show host, Steve Cochran, jumped ahead of a slumping WLOL and would, from that point on, be the dominant CHR station in the market. Playing catch-up, WLOL started tweaking the programming and air staff, including shaking up its longtime morning show. Finally, on May 11, 1990, WLOL switched to a Rhythmic Contemporary format. Labeling itself as "Today's Best Music", 99.5 WLOL hired a new airstaff and rejuvenated itself in the minds of listeners, managing a ratings improvement.

=== St. John's University ===
Saint John's University in Collegeville, near St. Cloud, built and began operating the first station in what would become the Minnesota Public Radio network, KSJR-FM (90.1), in January 1967. By 1968, it was obvious that there were not enough listeners in the immediate St. Cloud area for the station to be viable. KSJR nearly tripled its power in hopes of reaching listeners in the Twin Cities, but even then it only provided grade B coverage of Minneapolis and minimal coverage of St. Paul. To solve this problem, the university signed on KSJN at 91.1 MHz, originally licensed to the northern Twin Cities suburb of New Brighton. It served as a full-time repeater of KSJR-FM.

By 1969, Saint John University's realized it was in over its head operating a two radio stations, so it turned over KSJR and KSJN to a nonprofit corporation, Saint John's University Broadcasting. This organization later changed its name to Minnesota Educational Radio, and finally Minnesota Public Radio.

In 1969 and 1970, MPR assisted in the formation of National Public Radio (NPR) and was a founding member of the organization. Four years later, in 1974, the network began live broadcasts of Garrison Keillor's A Prairie Home Companion. The show was among NPR's most popular offerings and it aired each Saturday from the Fitzgerald Theater in St. Paul.

MPR purchased WLOL's 1330 kHz facility in 1980 and relaunched it as a dedicated news and talk service centered around NPR programming. The call letters were switched first to KSJN, and then KNOW in 1989.

=== KSJN and KNOW relocation ===
This hasn't been a fun time, but I am satisfied we did everything we could do to preserve WLOL in the Twin Cities. We just ran out of time. ... With little in the way of resources [the staff] gave KDWB a real good run."

— Rick Cummings, vice president of programming, Emmis Communications, on the end of WLOL

In 1989, Emmis CEO Jeff Smulyan bought the Seattle Mariners baseball team. As early as September 1989, rumors were swirling that WLOL might be up for sale to raise funds for the acquisition. It later emerged that Emmis had indeed placed the station up for sale.

On December 26, 1990—-realizing an ambition held for over a decade—-Minnesota Public Radio announced the purchase of the WLOL facility for $12 million. For Emmis, it was a discount on the original asking price of $20 million, which a slowing economy had put out of reach. The purchase would give MPR two FM frequencies in the Twin Cities. MPR had been operating both AM and FM stations since it had bought 1330 kHz—-the former WLOL AM-—in 1981. It would sell the AM station, by that time known as KNOW, to raise some of the funds for the FM purchase.

MPR announced that it would move its classical programming to the 99.5 frequency, giving classical music fans an all-classical outlet, while those interested in news and information would have their own full-time NPR station. The 91.1 frequency would become the new home of KNOW-FM, which no longer spent part of each day playing music.

Emmis took some steps toward enabling another commercial radio owner to pick up WLOL, going as far as to provide such a blueprint to other FM stations in the Twin Cities market. However, MPR fans wanted a full-power FM station for news and talk programs, as AM 1330 had been challenged by a poor signal in the western suburbs that were home to many MPR members, as well as in office buildings.

=== WLOL final broadcast ===
Meanwhile, pop music fans in the Twin Cities were upset as WLOL slowly counted down to its last day, February 26, 1991. WLOL's final broadcast culminated with a day-long farewell, playing music and jingles from the station's nearly 10 year-long Top 40/CHR era. Current and former airstaff offered farewell messages, and advertisements from KQRS-FM, KEEY-FM (where morning host John Hines later landed) and even KDWB redirected listeners to their stations. At 6:30 p.m., WLOL left the air with a half-hour montage of clips from songs played by the station during the Top 40/CHR era, followed by a sign-off announcement from Hines and "Miss You Much" by Janet Jackson (notably, when Jackson ends the song asking "That's the end?", Hines could be heard responding "Yes.").

At 7 p.m., after about a half hour of dead air, WLOL started playing music without live DJs. In addition, liners were played in between songs with KDWB wishing WLOL "happy trails" and redirecting listeners to their station. Around 8 p.m., WLOL officially signed off with the song "1999" by Minneapolis native Prince.

=== Classical KSJN ===
The next morning, 99.5 became the new home of KSJN, and began playing classical music 24 hours a day. The KNOW call sign, along with all NPR news and talk programming, moved to 91.1. On March 11, the KSJN call letters officially moved to 99.5 FM. Meanwhile, the KNOW-FM call sign was instituted on 91.1 FM.

The historic WLOL call letters were soon claimed by KXLV, a station located north of the Twin Cities in Cambridge at 105.3 FM. When that station was purchased and turned into WREV, the call sign was parked on KZTG (1470 AM). They were then used on 100.3 MHz from 1999 to 2003. The WLOL call sign would be restored to the 1330 kHz frequency in 2004, after it was acquired by the Relevant Radio network.

In 2005, KSJN was the first MPR station to broadcast regularly with the digital HD Radio system. KSJN currently features the Classical 24 feed on its HD2 subchannel.
