= John Hines (radio broadcaster) =

American radio broadcaster (1953–Present)

- Born: John Peter Hines; November 8, 1953 (age 72); Minneapolis, Minnesota, U.S.
- Occupation: Radio Broadcaster
- Children: 2
- Family: 7 Siblings

John Hines (born 1953) is a radio broadcaster known for being a disc jockey and talk-show host. His career spanned over four decades, across numerous stations in Minneapolis–Saint Paul, including KSTP, WLOL, KEEY-FM and WCCO (AM).

== Biography ==
Hines graduated from Roosevelt High School in 1971 and enrolled at Brown College three days later. His broadcasting career began in Normal, Illinois. After 13 months, Hines returned to Minneapolis in 1973 to work at WWTC-AM.

Hines's radio career began to skyrocket when he moved to 15 The Music Station in 1975 and teamed up with longtime Twin Cites broadcaster Charlie Bush.

When daytime television hosts Steve and Sharon Edelman left KSTP-TV in 1980, Hubbard Broadcasting chose Hines as their replacement. He hosted "Twin Cities Today" for one year. "I didn't like shaving and putting on a tie every day. So I thought, 'let's go back to radio as quick as possible'", Hines said.

Hines soon returned to radio, joining Bob Berglund at WLOL-FM in 1981. The pairing more than doubled the station's ratings in one year. Over the next eight years, no one surpassed Hines and Berglund when it came to promotion. According to Paul Levy:

Fact is, around the Twin Cities, these guys are seen nearly as often as they're heard. They've done broadcasts from the roof of the Metronome, a billboard near Interstate Hwys. 94 and 35W, the beat at Lake Nokomis and from a bus.

Hines stayed in morning drive at WLOL until it was sold to Minnesota Public Radio in 1990. He was then hired by K102, where he was reunited with Charlie Bush. The move catapulted K102 to second in listenership and first in the 25-to-54 demographic. Hines continued to work mornings at K102 for almost 17 years, during which time it won the Country Music Association's Station of the Year award.

In 2006, Hines moved to sister station KTLK-FM, where he hosted a morning talk show in an effort to bolster the startup station's star power.

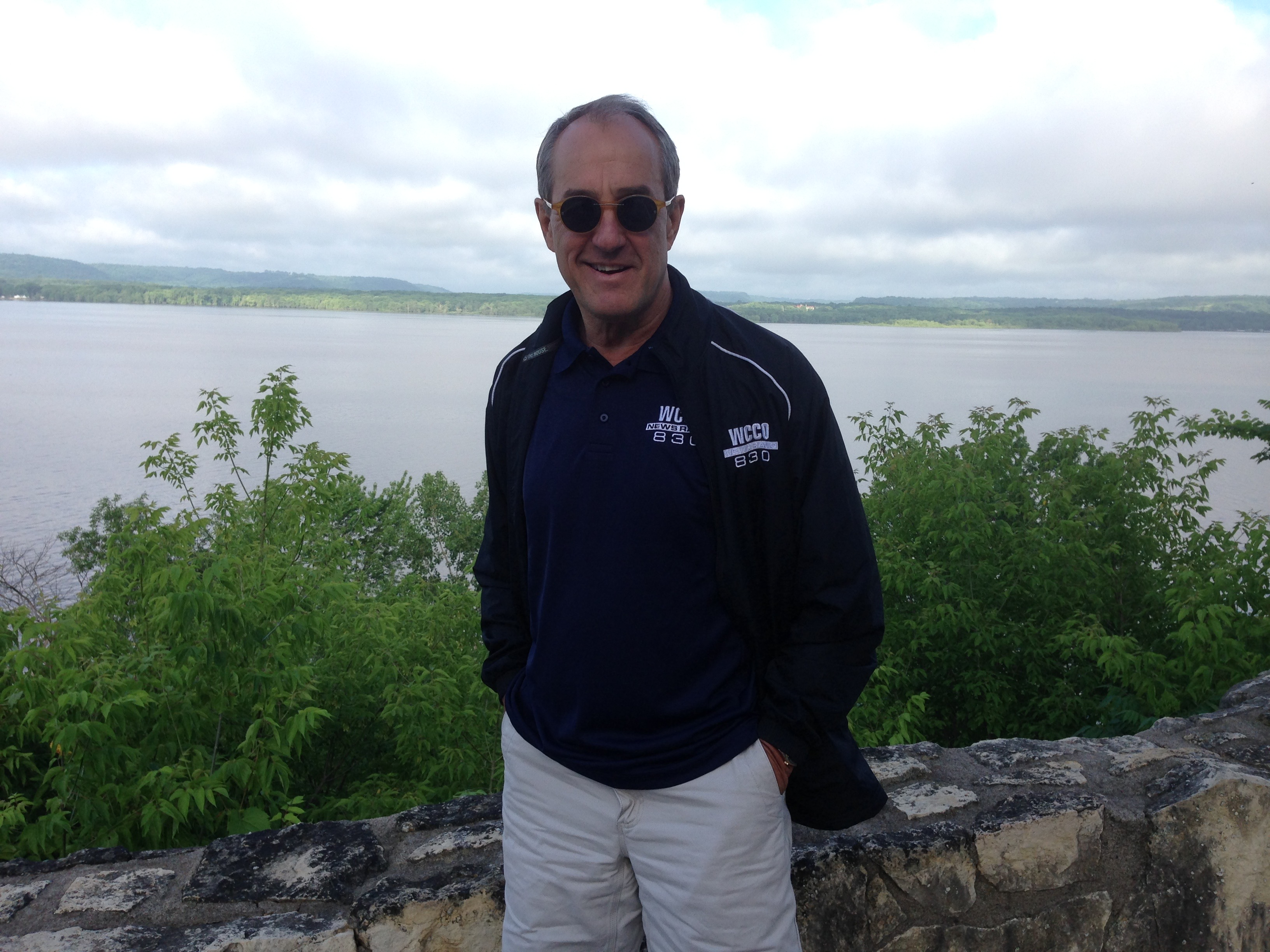
John Hines in 2014

In 2010, after almost two decades at Clear Channel, Hines joined News Radio 830 WCCO, where he first hosted an evening show. In 2011, Hines replaced John Williams in the midday time slot, where he worked daily broadcasting until 2018.

Hines was inducted into the Pavek Museum of Broadcasting in 2017.

Hines was active with many charities during his career, including once being buried alive for 48 hours to raise funds for Twin Cities food shelves. He has been married three times and has two sons.
