= John Hine (footballer) =

English footballer

Personal information
- Full name: John Robert Adams Hine
- Date of birth: 1895
- Place of birth: Burradon, England
- Position: Right half

Senior career*
Years	Team	Apps	(Gls)
1914	Newcastle United	0	(0)
1921	Ashington	1	(0)
- * Club domestic league appearances and goals

John Robert Adams Hine was an English professional footballer who played as a right half in the Football League for Ashington.

== Personal life ==
Hine served as a company quartermaster sergeant in the Lincolnshire Regiment and the Durham Light Infantry during the First World War.
