= William Hugh Kling =

American media executive

William Hugh Kling (born April 29, 1942) is the founder and president emeritus of Minnesota Public Radio and American Public Media. He was also a founding member of the board of directors of National Public Radio, the founding chairman/president of Southern California Public Radio in Los Angeles, and the founding chairman and president of Public Radio International. Kling is a social media entrepreneur who built both nonprofit public media companies and for-profit companies to support those nonprofits.

== Education ==
Kling has a BA in economics from Saint John's University, Collegeville, Minnesota and an MS from the Graduate School of Communications at Boston University. In 1964, he was asked by Saint John's University (where he had just earned his baccalaureate in economics) to attend graduate school in mass communications at Boston University and return to build a radio station.That station became the first in a series of 44 public radio stations ranging from Minnesota to Los Angeles and Miami. Kling is the recipient of honorary Doctor of Humane Letters degrees from Saint John's University (2011) and The College of St. Scholastica, Duluth, Minnesota (2013). In 2014 he was elected a Fellow of the American Academy of Arts and Sciences.

== Career ==
The first station, KSJR-FM, went on the air in January 1967, and was later spun off into a separate nonprofit community corporation (MPR), of which Kling was the founding president. Over the years, he helped lead the station to grow into a statewide network in Minnesota while building similar networks in California and Florida. He was a founding director of NPR and in 1983 he created a nationwide public radio distribution arm (American Public Media (APM)).

Kling served as president and CEO of American Public Media Group (APMG) until June 2011. APMG is the nonprofit parent support organization of Minnesota Public Radio (MPR), Southern California Public Radio (SCPR), Classical South Florida (CSF), and American Public Media (APM), and is the sole shareholder of the for-profit Greenspring Company. Kling also served as CEO of MPR|APM and of Greenspring Company and Vice Chair of SCPR and CSF.

As president of MPR|APM, Kling was responsible for MPR's three regional networks of 38 public radio stations (serving five million people in the Upper Midwest) and its national program production centers in Saint Paul, London, New York, and Los Angeles. American Public Media is the second-largest national producer of public radio programming, after National Public Radio (NPR) in Washington. Southern California Public Radio, of which Kling serves as vice-chair, operates radio stations KPCC (Pasadena) and KUOR (Redlands) under public service operating agreements with their respective licensees. SCPR serves 14 million people in the Los Angeles area. Kling was a founding board member of NPR in 1972. A founder of the Station Resource Group, the strategic think tank for public radio. A founder of the Association of Public Radio Stations which was the Washington DC representitation organization of the public Radio industry. He conceptualized the idea of The Public Radio Company, which was meant to help struggling stations re-organize their structure and fund their new models of operation.

The Greenspring Company, of which Kling was president until 2011, is the parent company for Greenspring Media Group, a diversified regional and national magazine publishing and event management company. In 1998, Greenspring sold another subsidiary, Rivertown Trading Company, to the Target Corporation for $134 million. Greenspring was sold in 2013.

Kling's tactics have come under fire as being aggressive. MPR, for example, bought rival classical-programming public radio station WCAL in Northfield, Minnesota when its owner, St. Olaf College, offered it for sale in 2004, eliminating a competitor for donor funds and switching the station's format to a widely successful alternative rock format hailed by younger Minnesotans.

On September 10, 2010, Kling announced that he was retiring as president of APMG and MPR as of June 2011. He said he intended to encourage a national fundraising effort to improve public media reporting strength and newsgathering capability in his role as President Emeritus of American Public Media.

Twin Cities MAgazine gave him their Hall of Fame Award of Distinction as Twin Citian of the Year in 1986. He was inducted into the PAvic Museum's Minnesota Broadcast Hall of Fame. Both the Minneapolis StarTribune and The St. Paul Pioneer Press listed Kling as one of 100 most significant Minnesotans of the Century in 2000.

In 2017 Minnesota Public Radio named its headquarters "The Kling Media Center" after him.

== Other business ventures ==
Kling was a director of Skyword, Inc. (formerly Gather, Inc.) , a story-driven advertising company operating in Boston. He retired as a director in February 2018.

From 1989 to 2005, Kling served as a director of Travelers Inc, a publicly held insurance company. He was also a director of the privately held Wenger Corporation, which designs and builds music related equipment and systems and is located in Owatonna, Minnesota.

Until December 2017, Kling served as a director of ten fund boards of the Los Angeles-based American Funds mutual fund family, all of which are managed by the Capital Group. These include The New Economy Fund, Smallcap World Fund, AMCAP, AMF, ICA, Global Balanced Fund, American Balanced Fund, The New Perspective Fund, The Euro Pacific Growth Fund and the New World Fund. He has served as non-executive chair of The New Economy Fund and The Smallcap World Fund.

Kling is a member of the Board of Trustees for St. John's University.

Kling is a former member and chair of the Board of Trustees of The Fitzgerald Theater in Saint Paul, which MPR owned. He is a former member of the Board of Trustees of the JL Foundation in Los Angeles. He was a founding Director of National Public Radio and the founding Chair and President of Public Radio International, which was formed as a subsidiary of MPR in 1983 and later spun off to independence. It is now owned by WGBH in Boston.

In 2004, he was inducted into the Minnesota Broadcaster's Hall of Fame.
