= KSJR-FM =

Classical Minnesota Public Radio station in Collegeville, Minnesota, United States

Coordinates: 45.498°N 94.537°W

- Collegeville, Minnesota; United States
- Broadcast area: St. Cloud, Minnesota
- Frequency: 90.1 MHz (HD Radio)
- Branding: YourClassical MPR

Programming
- Format: Public radio, Classical music
- Affiliations: Minnesota Public Radio; NPR; American Public Media

Ownership
- Owner: Minnesota Public Radio; (Minnesota Public Radio)
- Sister stations: KNSR

History
- First air date: January 22, 1967
- Call sign meaning: Saint John's Radio

Technical information
- Licensing authority: FCC
- Facility ID: 42955
- Class: C1
- ERP: 100,000 watts
- HAAT: 258 meters (846 ft)
- Translators: 90.9 K215BL (Alexandria); 103.9 K280ET (Olivia)

Links
- Public license information: Public file; LMS
- Webcast: Listen live
- Website: Classical Minnesota Public Radio

KSJR-FM (90.1 MHz) is a radio station licensed to Collegeville, Minnesota, and serving the St. Cloud area. The station is owned by Minnesota Public Radio (MPR), and airs MPR's "Classical Music Network", originating from the Twin Cities. The station has inserts at least once an hour for local underwriting and weather. KSJR operates as a Class C1 station with 100,000 watts from a tower north of Richmond, Minnesota, serving the St. Cloud region and central Minnesota.

KSJR was the birthplace of Minnesota Public Radio. It signed on from the campus of Saint John's University on January 22, 1967. The first studios were constructed on the third floor of Wimmer Hall on the Saint John's campus, in a space that had previously served as a museum and library. The first official programming was a pre-recorded concert by the Cleveland Orchestra. It soon became apparent that the station needed to reach the Twin Cities, an hour southeast, to survive, as the St. Cloud/Stearns County area was not large enough for the station to be viable. KSJR tripled its power in hopes of reaching the Twin Cities market. Even then, it barely covered Minneapolis and missed St. Paul. The station's general manager, Bill Kling, then persuaded Saint John's to sign on a repeater for the Twin Cities, KSJN. But by 1969, the operation was still awash in debt, so Saint John's transferred the stations to a nonprofit corporation that evolved into Minnesota Public Radio.

MPR moved its headquarters to St. Paul in 1971, and KSJR eventually reduced its power to normal levels as KSJN became the flagship station. In 1988 it became an all-classical station, with news and talk moving to KNSR at 88.9. MPR still maintains office and studio space on the St. John's campus.

The station served as the career launchpad for several major figures in public broadcasting. Garrison Keillor was hired as a morning classical music announcer for KSJR in 1969, and Michael Barone was appointed music director the same year.

- See also Minnesota Public Radio

== Translators ==
KSJR-FM is relayed by two additional translator stations.

Broadcast translators for KSJR-FM
Call sign	Frequency	City of license	FID	ERP (W)	FCC info
K215BL	90.9 FM	Alexandria, Minnesota	42971	18	LMS
K280ET	103.9 FM	Olivia, Minnesota	152436	170	LMS
