= Haig Mardirosian =

American musician

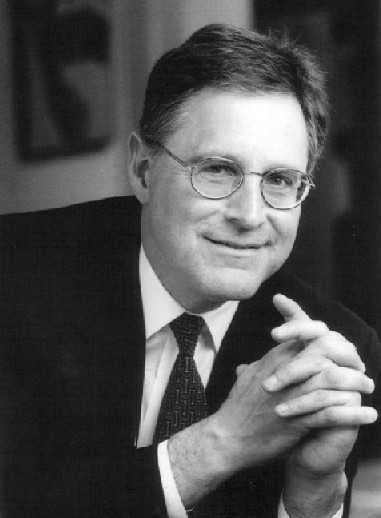
- Born: 1947 (age 78–79); New York City
- Occupations: Organist and Dean Emeritus of the College of Arts and Letters at the University of Tampa

Haig Mardirosian (born 1947 in New York City) is Dean Emeritus of the College of Arts and Letters at the University of Tampa, Professor Emeritus at American University in Washington, DC, a concert organist, composer, and conductor. He has performed in many of the most important concert venues throughout North America and Europe. He has over a dozen commercial recordings to his credit including well known and respected performances of the organ works of Bach, Brahms, Liszt, Petr Eben, and Jean Langlais.

== Performing career ==
In 1977, Haig Mardirosian was invited to be the first American to perform in the International Organ Week in Bonn, Germany. In 1989, he was one of two Americans performing in the first (and only) Soviet-American Organ Music Festival. In 1999, he was awarded a Swiss-American Cultural Exchange Partner Grant in collaboration with Ensemble Corund, the only professional choir in German-speaking Switzerland, a grant that resulted in a study and performing tour of Switzerland. In sum, he has performed well over 500 solo recitals in some of the most important venues of his profession and under the sponsorship of the most importing presenting organizations including the American Guild of Organists and the Royal Canadian College of Organists.

As composer, conductor, and organist, Mardirosian has been heard on WDR, the BBC, Belgian Radio, the Voice of America, ABC, National Public Radio, and American Public Media. This broadcast work includes important broadcasts from the famed Busch-Reisinger Museum at Harvard University. His new Requiem for choir, strings, and percussion was premiered in November, 2007 in Washington, DC.

== Writer ==
For 25 years, Mardirosian served as a critic for Fanfare Magazine, the leading recording review journal in the United States, and for 26 years he has written reviews of recordings, scores, books, and New Media for The American Organist for which publication he continues to write his monthly editorial column, Vox Humana. He has also contributed articles to The Diapason and The Journal of American Organbuilding. In 1993, he traveled to Stockholm, Sweden, under the auspices of a grant from the Swedish Institute, to research and write about the music of Otto Olsson. In sum, he has produced more than 1900 articles. He is also active as a consultant on the design and construction of pipe organs.

== Recording artist ==
Haig Mardirosian records for Centaur Records. His releases include two masses of Orlande de Lassus with the source motets, in which he conducts the Choir of the Church of the Ascension and Saint Agnes, Washington, DC. He has also recorded a collection of organ suites, music of the late Czech composer, Petr Eben, and the Bach, Clavierübung, Part III. In fall, 2008, he recorded the organ works of Johannes Brahms for the second time in his career.

Haig Mardirosian was previously Dean of Academic Affairs and Professor of Music at American University in Washington, DC, and Organist and Choirmaster at the Church of the Ascension and Saint Agnes (Washington D.C.). He was Organist and Music Director at St. Andrew's Episcopal Church in Tampa, FL, from 2016-2018.

== Discography ==
- Mors et Ressurectio [sic], Chant Requiem and Mass for Easter, Centaur Records CRC 3028
- Brahms, Complete Organ Works, Centaur Records CRC 2996
- Lo in the Time Appointed, A&StA 0601
- Bach, Clavierübung III, Centaur Records CRC 2667
- Choral Works of Orlande de Lassus, Centaur Records CRC 2477
- The Washington Organ Book, Gothic Records CD 49059
- Organ Suites, Centaur Records CRC 2368
- Eben and Langlais Organ Works, Centaur Records CRC 2042
- Mozart, Vespers and Mass, Centaur Records CRC 2074
- Works of Mendelssohn, Schroder, Organophon Records E 90018
- Organ Music of Liszt, Mitra Records, M 16182
- 20th Century English Organ Music, Musical Heritage Society MHS 3265
- English Organ Voluntaries of the 18th Century, Musical Heritage Society, MHS 1854
- Organ Works of Johannes Brahms, Musical Heritage Society, MHS 1751

== Books ==
- Vox Humana: Essays about the World of the Pipe Organ and Those who Play it, St. Louis: Morningstar Music Publishers, 2017.
- J. Michael Barone and Pipedreams, New York: The American Guild of Organists Monograph Series, No. 1, 2018.
- The Organ on Campus,New York: The American Guild of Organists Monograph Series, No. 2, 2018 (in preparation).
- The Making of a Virtuoso, New York: The American Guild of Organists Monograph Series, No. 3, 2018 (in preparation).
