= Minnesota Public Radio =

Public radio network in Minnesota

Coordinates: 44°56′56″N 93°05′43″W

- Type: Public radio network
- Country: United States
- Headquarters: Saint Paul, Minnesota, U.S.

Programming
- Affiliations: National Public Radio; American Public Media; Public Radio Exchange

Ownership
- Owner: American Public Media Group
- Key people: Duchesne Drew, President

History
- Launch date: 1967; 59 years ago
- Former names: Saint John's University Broadcasting; Minnesota Educational Radio

Coverage
- Availability: Global

Links
- Webcast: YourClassical MPR; MPR News; The Current
- Website: mpr.org mprnews.org yourclassical.org

Minnesota Public Radio (MPR) is a public radio network for the US state of Minnesota. With its three services, MPR News, YourClassical MPR and The Current, MPR operates a 46-station regional radio network in the upper Midwest.

MPR has won more than 875 journalism awards, including the Peabody Award, both the RTNDA Edward R. Murrow Award and the Corporation for Public Broadcasting award of the same name, and the Alfred I. duPont-Columbia University Gold Baton Award. As of September 2011, MPR was tied with WNYC for most listener support for a public radio network, and had the highest level of recurring monthly donors of any public radio network in the nation.

MPR also produces and distributes national public radio programming via American Public Media.

== History ==
Minnesota Public Radio began on January 22, 1967, when KSJR-FM first signed on from the campus of Saint John's University in Collegeville, just outside St. Cloud. Colman Barry, then president of Saint John's, saw promise in the then relatively new technology of FM radio, and believed radio was an appropriate extension of Saint John's cultural and artistic functions to the broader community. He hired a 23-year-old graduate of St. John's, William H. Kling, as director of broadcasting.

The network began more or less out of necessity. Shortly after KSJR signed on, it became apparent that St. Cloud and surrounding Stearns County did not have enough listeners for the station to be viable. Kling more than tripled KSJR's power in hopes of reaching the Twin Cities, but that only provided grade B coverage to Minneapolis and the western portion of the metro, and completely missed St. Paul and the east. Realizing that the station needed to cover the Twin Cities to have a realistic chance of survival, St. John's started KSJN, a low-powered repeater station for the Twin Cities, in 1968. The operation was awash in debt, and by 1969, St. John's realized it did not have adequate financial or personnel resources to operate a full-fledged noncommercial radio station. With Barry's support, Saint John's transferred KSJR/KSJN's assets to a community corporation, St. John's University Broadcasting. This corporation later changed its name to Minnesota Educational Radio, and finally Minnesota Public Radio. Kling led MPR as president and CEO for 44 years before retiring in 2011.

MPR was a charter member of National Public Radio in 1971, and had helped lay the groundwork for forming that organization during 1969 and 1970. In 1971, operations moved from Collegeville to St. Paul, funded in part with a news programming "demonstration" grant from the Corporation for Public Broadcasting. New studios were built and KSJN became the flagship station. In the 1970s, additional stations were added across Minnesota. During this period KSJN's news department won numerous regional and national awards and became one of the region's most highly regarded news operations.

In 1974, MPR began live broadcasting of Garrison Keillor's A Prairie Home Companion, one of the best-known programs on public radio, from the Park Square Theatre in Saint Paul. In the program's early days, members of the production staff worked hard to fill the theatre seats, sometimes bringing in radio station staff and urging passersby to come into the theatre from the street. In 1980, MPR originated the Peabody Award-winning classical music show Saint Paul Sunday, which went national via syndication in 1981.

MPR assisted in 1983 with the formation of American Public Radio, later known as Public Radio International (PRI), which merged with Public Radio Exchange in 2019.

Originally, MPR played a mix of classical music and NPR news/talk programming. But as NPR expanded its offerings, Kling made plans to split MPR into separate classical and news/talk networks. To that end, MPR sought to buy a second FM frequency in the Twin Cities from the late 1970s onward. As a fallback, in 1980 it bought WLOL (AM 1330), one of Minnesota's oldest stations, and changed its calls to KSJN (AM), a simulcast of KSJN-FM. In 1989, AM 1330 changed its calls to KNOW and began airing an expanded lineup of NPR programming. In 1991, MPR bought WLOL-FM, AM 1330's former FM sister, allowing it to finally split its services into two networks. The KNOW call letters and intellectual unit, including the NPR news and talk format, moved to KSJN's old frequency of 91.1. The KSJN calls moved to WLOL-FM's former frequency of 99.5, which began playing classical music full-time.

MPR acquired Marketplace Productions, which produces Marketplace, "Marketplace Morning Report" and "Marketplace Money", from studios in Los Angeles, in association with the University of Southern California, in 2000. The same year, MPR founded Southern California Public Radio, which entered into a public service operating agreement with Pasadena City College to run KPCC in Pasadena, California. In 2004, MPR began distributing its own shows through American Public Media (APM), leaving PRI; APM was the third radio network in the U.S. to receive founding support from MPR, probably an unmatched record for an American radio station or network.

In 2004, MPR announced it would buy WCAL (89.3 FM), the classical music station operated by St. Olaf College in Northfield, Minnesota. WCAL (and a repeater station, KMSE in Rochester), were sold in a deal valued at $10.5 million, which the Federal Communications Commission approved in 2004. The next year, following the acquisition by MPR, WCAL changed its call letters to KCMP and was transformed into MPR's third service, "The Current".

In 2008, a WCAL advocacy group took St. Olaf College to court for breach of trust in selling the radio station. (A June 2008 judge's opinion described the station as a charitable trust and therefore not the college's property to freely dispose of. MPR's General Counsel and three attorneys took part in the proceedings. In 2009 a court found in favor of MPR, ruling that the statute of limitations on the matter had expired, nullifying the advocacy group's standing.)

Today, MPR serves a regional audience of one million listeners through 43 stations presenting three broadcast network services.

Original materials from Minnesota Public Radio have been contributed to the American Archive of Public Broadcasting.

== Services ==
With the addition of later stations, MPR originally offered a mix of classical music and NPR news/talk programming on a single service. Beginning in 1991, MPR's programming split in two, forming separate news and classical music services (although one station in the Upper Peninsula of Michigan still carries a combination of the two). The 2005 acquisition of WCAL in Northfield, Minnesota, which covers the Minneapolis–St. Paul and Rochester areas, provided the opportunity to launch another music service, "The Current." This third service has gradually expanded to most of southeastern Minnesota.

=== MPR News ===
MPR's news and information service includes a mix of locally produced programs and national/international shows. The flagship station is KNOW-FM (91.1 FM) in the Twin Cities.

The MPR newsroom has garnered international acclaim, earning the inaugural Knight News Innovation EPpy Award in 2008. The newsroom is known for its Public Insight Network, a database of citizen sources who contribute their expertise on a wide array of topics. The Public Insight Network grew to 140,000 sources in 2011 and partners with other news media, journalism schools, foundations and community groups.

As of 2022, 24 full-power stations carry MPR's News and Information service and various translator signals around the state offer additional coverage.

MPRNews.org is a nonprofit news website maintained by MPR. This online news source covers issues that affect the state including politics, business, education, health, environment, and the economy. MPR News offers headline news, video, blogs, audio, and multiple ways for readers to become involved in the news-making process.

=== YourClassical MPR ===
MPR's classical music network is carried on 18 full-power stations and various translators offer additional coverage. The flagship station is KSJN (99.5 FM), in the Twin Cities. In April 2021, the station rebranded as YourClassical MPR, aligning it with the umbrella branding used for American Public Media's digital classical music platforms and nationally distributed programming. Most of the network's schedule is a simulcast of APM's Classical 24 network, although statewide morning and afternoon shows air Monday through Friday and the network airs various specials and live broadcasts. The HD 2 signal of KSJN-FM offers a 24-hour feed of the Classical 24 network.

On September 10, 2020, Garrett McQueen, the host of Classical 24's Music Through the Night and MPR's only African-American classical music host, was terminated by American Public Media for "not following programming guidelines." According to McQueen, he was "given two warnings—one of which was about his need to improve communication and the other warning was for switching out scheduled music to play pieces he felt were more appropriate to the moment and more diverse."

=== The Current ===
MPR's third service, The Current, debuted on January 24, 2005, and airs an adult album alternative format.

Several people on The Current's initial staff are well known in the area for previous work at stations that highlight music from Minnesota and the Upper Midwest. Many of the staffers and on-air personalities came from other similar stations, such as the University of Minnesota's KUOM, community-oriented KFAI, and commercial alternative rock outlets REV 105 and Cincinnati, Ohio's WOXY.com.

Programming on The Current is mostly locally produced. The flagship station is KCMP (89.3 FM), licensed to Northfield on the southeastern periphery of the Twin Cities, though the signal covers most of the metro area. A lower-power station, KMSE (88.7 FM), serves Rochester and southeastern Minnesota, KZIO (104.3 FM) serves the Duluth area, and translators offer additional coverage in other parts of the state. The service is also carried as an HD service on several of MPR's full power stations. KPCC, the NPR affiliate in Los Angeles operated by MPR's parent company, APM, carries The Current on its HD 2 signal. The Current also streams online in a variety of formats.

=== Additional services ===
Minnesota Public Radio also programs several other music services, all available online, with a few offered on HD Radio in the Twin Cities area.

Carbon Sound is the newest MPR service, focused on R&B music and Black artists. In addition to streaming online, it is available on the HD 2 subchannel of KCMP in the Twin Cities.

Local Current is a service programmed by the staff of The Current, and features music from Minnesota artists. The service streams online.

Purple Current is an R&B and Hip-Hop service inspired by Prince.

Rock The Cradle is also programmed by personnel at The Current, and airs a variation of their AAA format, with music geared toward children and parents. It is available via a separate webstream.

Radio Heartland features an eclectic mix of acoustic, Americana and roots music. The service can be found on the HD2 subchannel of KNOW-FM and also via a separate webcast. KNOW-FM also features an HD3 subchannel consisting of programming from NPR and the BBC World Service. The signal carries additional hours of Morning Edition and All Things Considered not available on KNOW's main signal. Several other NPR and APM shows air on the service.

Subsidiary Communications Authority (SCA's) are used to transmit a Minnesota version of the Radio Talking Book Network to disabled listeners around the state, in cooperation with Minnesota State Services for the Blind. MPR also serves as the radio backbone for the radio portion of the state's Emergency Alert System, and as the backbone for the state's Amber alert system.

MPR owns WGGL, the NPR affiliate serving Houghton, Michigan. The station airs a combination of NPR News, BBC World Service and Classical 24 programming. While MPR supplies weather updates, local MPR programming and news updates are not aired on the station.

== Programs ==
Minnesota Public Radio regional programs:

- The Jazz Image
- The Morning Show
- Open Air

American Public Media programs heard on Minnesota Public Radio:

- American RadioWorks
- American Routes
- As It Happens
- Classical 24
- Live from Here, formerly known as The Show with Chris Thile,
  (formerly known as A Prairie Home Companion)
- Marketplace
- On Being
- Performance Today
- Pipedreams
- Saint Paul Sunday
- The Splendid Table
- The Story
- Weekend America
- The Writer's Almanac
- Climate Cast

Other programs heard on Minnesota Public Radio:

- All Things Considered
- American Routes
- As it Happens
- BBC World Service
- Car Talk
- Day to Day
- Fresh Air
- Morning Edition
- On the Media
- Only A Game
- Radio Lab
- Sound Opinions
- Sounds Eclectic
- Studio 360
- Talk of the Nation
- This American Life
- Wait Wait... Don't Tell Me!
- Weekend Edition (Saturday and Sunday)
- The World

== Revenue and expenses ==
Minnesota Public Radio is a nonprofit 501(c)(3) organization.

MPR's funding comes from listener contributions (membership dues), foundations, corporate and private contributions, government grants, advertising, education partners, and publicly traded securities.

The for-profit Rivertown Trading Company, once a subsidiary of MPR's parent company, was sold in 1998 for $124 million. Profits went toward creating MPR's endowment, a percentage of which contributes to MPR's annual budget.

=== Annual expenses ===
Total expenses for MPR for fiscal year 2023 (July 1, 2022, to June 30, 2023), as shown in the MPR Board of Trustees audit, was $117.1 million ($119.7 million the next year). That includes $17.7 million spent on fundraising and is distributed among the categories in the table below.

Summary table for MPR 2023 expenses
Category	Millions of dollars
Salaries and wages	47.7
Employee Benefits and Payroll Taxes	10.7
Professional Fees and Marketing	27.3
Production and Acquisition	13.6
Office and Occupancy	1.1
Interest	0.2
Dereciation and Amortization	3.0
Financial	1.2
Other Expenses	2.1
Total	117.1

On MPR's federal 2021 tax form, total expenses are shown as $112,380,820.

On its federal 2021 tax form, MPR entered $9.2 million for "Fees for services (nonemployees)" under the category "Other". Since that amount is less than 10% (8.2%) of its total expenses, MPR is not required to provide details on Schedule O, and none were provided.

On MPR's federal 2022 tax form (the most recent available), total expenses are shown as $115,780,425.

On its federal 2022 tax form, MPR entered $10.4 million for "Fees for services (nonemployees)" under the category "Other". That amount is also less than 10% (8.9%) of its total expenses, and no details were provided on Schedule O.

=== Compensation for officers, directors, trustees, and key employees ===
The table below shows MPR's highest-compensated employees, as listed on MPR's 2021 tax return.

Compensation in 2021
Person	Position	Compensation (dollars)
David Kansas	Former EVP & President, APM	652,287
Jon McTaggart	President & CEO. APMG	558,767
Kai Ryssdal	Host	469,760
Kevin Gilman	National Account Executive	465,520
Duchesne Drew	President MPR	452,712
Michael Lewis	Senior Vice President & GCO	452,105
David Brancaccio	Host	423,104
Morris Goodwin JR.	Senior Vice President & CPO, AMPG	420,185

Per the 2021 tax return, the average compensation for the eight highest-compensated employees was $486,805.

Per the 2022 tax return, the average compensation for the eight highest-compensated employees was $550,073.

=== Revenue details ===
Total revenue shown on MPR's 2022 tax return was $113,958,386.

Total revenue shown on MPR's 2021 tax return was $174,153,779.

The amounts listed in the table below are from MPR's 2021 tax return.

MPR revenue in 2021
Contributions, gifts and grants
Category	Dollars
Membership dues	92,201,208
Related organizations	11,840,216
Government grants	7,782,345
Other contributions	32,556,823
Publicly traded securities	2,321,333
Program service and other revenue
Category	Dollars
Program service	15,541,055
Advertising	4,594,444
Other earned	2,830,605
Royalties	5,456,642
Other	1,350,441
Total revenue	174,153,779

== Broadcast coverage ==
Minnesota Public Radio broadcasts on several dozen stations that serve Minnesota and its neighboring communities and various translators providing additional local coverage. Stations are in Minnesota, South Dakota (Brookings and Sioux Falls), Michigan (Houghton) and Iowa (Decorah). MPR also operates KPCC in Pasadena, California. In 2024, MPR-operated KWRV in Sun Valley, Idaho was purchased by Boise State Public Radio.

Most areas are served by both a classical music station and a news and information station. Duluth and Rochester are served by a classical music station, a news and information station, and The Current.

MPR's newest service, The Current, is available in Austin, Hinckley, Mankato, the Twin Cities, New Ulm, Rochester, St. Cloud (Collegeville), and St. Peter.

Minnesota Public Radio also broadcasts all three of its services—News, Classical and The Current—on HD Radio in several Minnesota communities. In the Twin Cities, MPR multicasts Classical 24, an additional news service and Purple Current.

=== Public Insight Network ===
Public Insight Network (PIN), a newsgathering and networking initiative founded by MPR, was created by American Public Media in 2003. Through the PIN initiative, a community of citizens consigned their insights, personal experiences, and firsthand knowledge to journalists they trusted. This shared knowledge could then be included in printed materials, broadcast on live news, or shared on the Internet. PIN contributed to national shows such as Marketplace.

== See also ==
- Independent Public Radio (another public radio network in Minnesota, known as AMPERS)
