= College of Saint Benedict and Saint John's University =

Private liberal arts colleges in Minnesota

College of Saint Benedict
- Motto: Sic Luceat Lux Vestra
- Motto in English: So Let Your Light Shine
- Type: Private women's liberal arts college
- Established: 1913
- Religious affiliation: Roman Catholic (Benedictine)
- Academic affiliations: Phi Beta Kappa Association of Benedictine Colleges and Universities; NAICU
- Endowment: $157.2 million (2025)
- President: Brian J. Bruess
- Provost: Richard Ice
- Faculty: 300 full-time; 52 part-time
- Students: 1,429 (fall 2024)
- Undergraduates: 1,391 (fall 2024)
- Postgraduates: 38 (fall 2024)
- Location: St. Joseph, Minnesota, United States; 45.5611°N 94.3219°W
- Campus: Rural
- Nickname: Bennies
- Sporting affiliations: NCAA Division III – MIAC
- Website: www.csbsju.edu

Saint John's University
- Former names: Saint John's Seminary; Saint John’s College (1857–1883)
- Motto: Induamur Arma Lucis
- Motto in English: Put on the Armor of Light
- Type: Private men's liberal arts college
- Established: 1857; 169 years ago
- Endowment: $308.9 million (2025)
- President: Brian J. Bruess
- Students: 1,572 (fall 2024)
- Undergraduates: 1,413 (fall 2024)
- Postgraduates: 159 (fall 2024)
- Location: Collegeville, Minnesota, United States; 45°34′51″N 94°23′33″W
- Colors: Red and blue
- Nickname: Johnnies
- Mascot: Rat (unofficial)
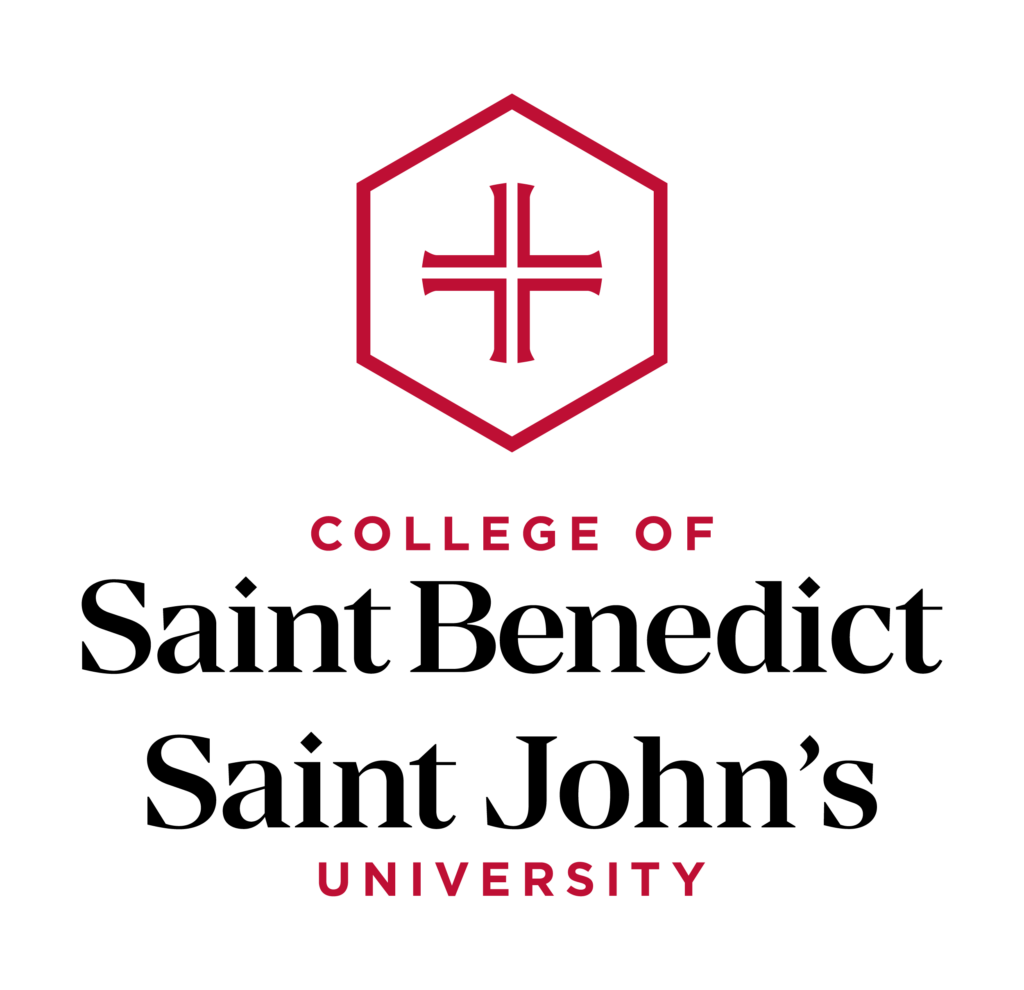

The College of Saint Benedict and Saint John's University (CSBSJU) are two closely related private, Benedictine liberal arts colleges in Minnesota. The College of Saint Benedict is a college for women in St. Joseph and Saint John's University is a university for men in Collegeville. Students at the institutions have a shared curriculum and access to the resources of both campuses. Together, the College of Saint Benedict and Saint John's University offer over 70 areas of study to undergraduate students, plus graduate programs in nursing and theology.

== History ==
=== College of Saint Benedict ===
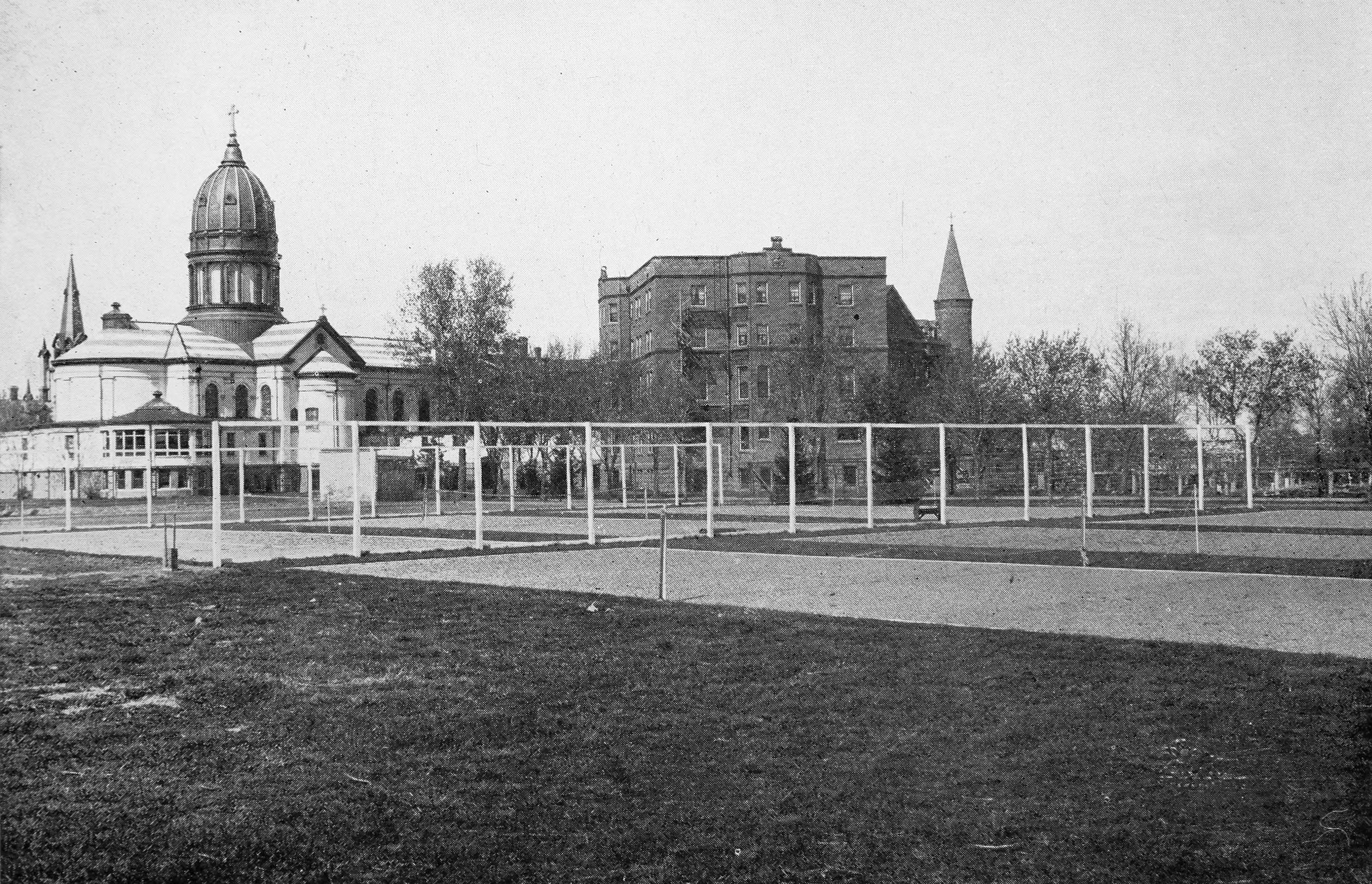
Tennis courts, 1918

The College of Saint Benedict (CSB) opened in 1913, with six students enrolled, and grew out of St. Benedict's Academy, which was founded by Saint Benedict's Monastery in 1889. The Benedictine community incorporated CSB in 1961.

In addition to its undergraduate offerings, CSB offers three graduate nursing tracks that confer Doctor of Nursing and Master of Science in Nursing degrees.

=== Saint John's University ===
Saint John's University (SJU) is the oldest continuously operating institution of higher learning in Minnesota. It was founded in 1857 by the Benedictine monks of Saint John's Abbey, having emigrated from the Kingdom of Bavaria, under the patronage of King Ludwig II. In addition to its undergraduate offerings, SJU includes Saint John's School of Theology and Seminary (SOT), a graduate school that confers Master of Divinity and master of arts degrees and also prepares seminarians for the priesthood.

Minnesota Public Radio began on January 22, 1967, when KSJR signed on from the campus of Saint John's University. The station's director of broadcasting was SJU alumnus Bill Kling.

SJU has produced its own coarse-grained bread, Johnnie Bread, since 1856, and used the proceeds to fund projects such as the Abbey Church.

Saint John's University operated St. John's Indian Industrial School, a Native American residential school from 1885 to 1896. In 1888, Indigenous residential school students represented 47 percent of the university's student population.

=== Institutional partnership ===
Starting in 1955, CSB and SJU began offering joint evening classes, where men and women attend classes together on both campuses. They began sharing a common academic program in the 1960s, and a classes now are co-educational and taught by a shared faculty of approximately 300 professors, mostly full-time, permanent appointees. About 3,000 students are enrolled in CSB and SJU.

Prior to 2022, the two institutions were led by separate presidents. Brian J. Bruess became the first person to serve as president of both the College of Saint Benedict and Saint John's University on July 1, 2022, succeeding transitional presidents Laurie Hamen and James Mullen.

== Academics ==
Ninety percent of CSB and SJU graduates finish in four years, 95% of CSB and SJU students receive financial aid, and 95% of CSB and SJU alums rate their college experience as good or excellent. CSB and SJU have produced four Rhodes Scholars and nine Truman Scholars. CSB and SJU are also a consistent producer of Fulbright scholarship winners. From 2013 to 2020, 39 students from CSB/SJU received Fulbright Scholarships. CSB/SJU has also been recently recognized as a top producer of Peace Corps volunteers.

The most popular majors at St. Benedict, by 2021 graduates, were:

Psychology (54)
Biology/Biological Sciences (48)
Registered Nursing/Registered Nurse (46)
Elementary Education and Teaching (42)
Accounting (29)
Speech Communication and Rhetoric (29)

The most popular undergraduate majors at St. John's, by 2021 graduates, were:

Business Administration and Management, General (64)
Accounting (52)
Computer Science (33)
Biology/Biological Sciences (27)
Speech Communication and Rhetoric (25)
Economics (24)
Psychology (23)

85% of CSB and SJU professors are full-time, the student-to-faculty ratio is 12:1, and the average class size is 19.

=== Phi Beta Kappa ===
Phi Beta Kappa is the nation's oldest academic honor society. CSB/SJU's Phi Beta Kappa chapter, Theta of Minnesota, was established in 2009.

=== Study abroad ===
Alumnus trekking in Tibet

CSB and SJU have achieved national recognition for strength in study abroad and international education opportunities. The Institute of International Education ranks CSB and SJU among the top baccalaureate institutions in the nation for the number of students who study abroad. According to Open Doors 2018, CSB and SJU ranked second in the nation among undergraduate institutions for participation in semester-long study abroad programs. There are 17 semester-long study abroad sites available on six different continents. These destinations include: Austria, Chile, China, France, Germany, Greece/Italy, Japan, London, Australia, Guatemala, South Africa, Spain, Northern Ireland and multiple cities in Republic of Ireland.

=== Internationalization ===
CSB and SJU enroll approximately 250 students from 50 countries and offer 200 undergraduate courses that have a global focus. In 2012, CSB and SJU received the Senator Paul Simon Award for Comprehensive Internationalization.

=== Center for Ethical Leadership in Action ===
In 2017, an anonymous donor provided a $10-million gift to create the Center for Ethical Leadership in Action at the College of Saint Benedict. This gift is now used to fund student experiences and research as well as provide financial assistance for students completing unpaid internships.

== Campus ==
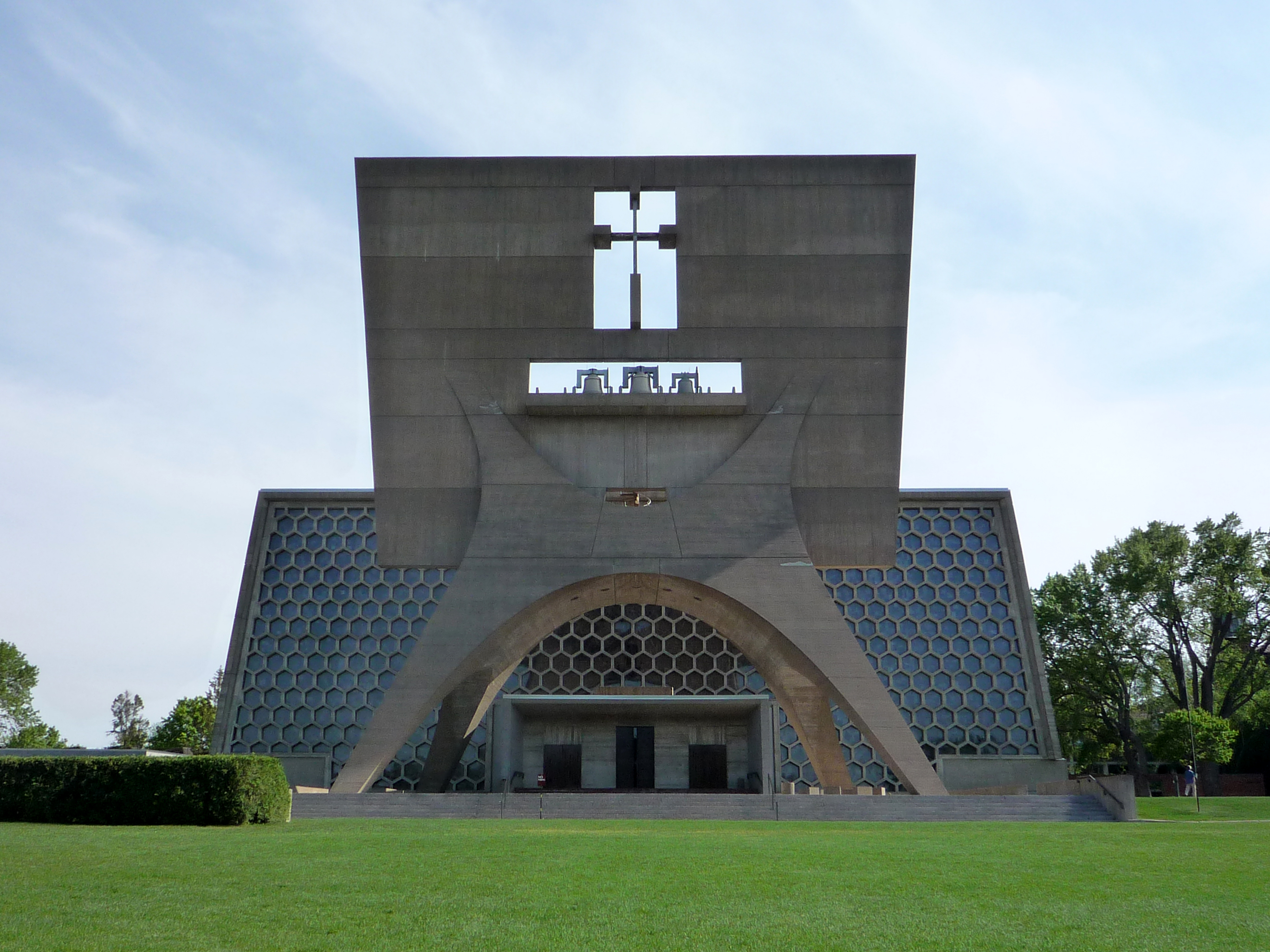
Marcel Breuer's Saint John's Abbey Church

The campuses are on 3,500 acres (1,400 ha) of forests, prairies, and lakes. Since CSB and SJU are about three and a half miles apart, a regular inter-campus bus service known as "The Link" connects the campuses.

The Brutalist architect Marcel Breuer designed several buildings on the Saint John's campus in the 1960s, including the Saint John's Abbey Church and bell banner; Alcuin Library; Peter Engel Science Center; the Ecumenical Institute, and Saints Thomas, Bernard, Boniface, and Patrick Residence Halls.

The central cores of the College of Saint Benedict and Saint John's University are both listed as historic districts on the National Register of Historic Places.

The campus area first appeared as a census-designated place (CDP) in the 2020 census with a population of 1,585.

=== Saint John's Outdoor University ===
The Saint John's Outdoor University comprises four branches: the Peer Resource Program (PRP), Outdoor Leadership Center (OLC), Saint John's Abby Arboretum, and Saint John's Maple Syrup.

- The PRP mission statement is to challenge students to learn new physical and mental skills that will push them out of their comfort zone and allow them to develop leadership skills and increase self-confidence through wilderness trips, challenge courses, and on-campus events. The PRP also sponsors Collegebound, a pre-orientation wilderness trip for incoming freshman to northern Minnesota.
- The OLC's mission is to promote experiential learning through outdoor programming, provide alternative outdoor leadership opportunities, and introduce the CSB/SJU community to new areas of the outdoors. The OLC achieves this by sponsoring on-campus programs and clinics and by providing students with access to outdoor equipment.
- The SJU campus is surrounded by Saint John's Arboretum, more than 2,500 acres of oak savanna, forest, prairie, wetlands, and lakes. These lands were designated as natural arboretum in 1997. The Arboretum is crisscrossed with groomed Nordic skiing and hiking trails, including the popular "chapel walk" along Lake Sagatagan to Stella Maris Chapel.
- Starting in 1942, monks at Saint John's Abbey began making maple syrup due to sugar shortages caused by World War II. The tradition of making Saint John's Maple Syrup has continued since, and remains a popular outdoor education opportunity for local schools. Saint John's Maple Syrup is made annually by the community and student volunteers, and in 2019 alone over 2,800 people participated in the syrup-making process in some capacity.

=== Sustainability ===
CSB and SJU were listed in "The Princeton Review's Guide to 361 Green Colleges: 2016 Edition" as institutions with "notable commitments to sustainability in their academic offerings, campus infrastructure, activities and career preparation." Each campus has its own sustainability office to foster a strong culture of sustainability among the students and the broader community. The institutions signed the American College & University Presidents' Climate Commitment (ACUPCC) in 2007, which formalized their goal of achieving carbon neutrality by 2035. CSB/SJU have taken dramatic steps to reduce greenhouse gas emissions. In the most recent report, Saint John's reported a 56% reduction in emissions since 2008 levels. Both institutions also complete STARS reports on sustainability and are signatories of the Catholic Climate Covenant.

Saint John's Abbey Energy Farm The Saint John's Abbey is well known for having one of the state's largest solar fields. The original 3.9-acre facility was built in 2009, and its tracking panels provide the university with about 4% of its annual energy needs and up to 20% of its real-time needs in peak conditions. In 2014, the Solar Farm was expanded to include 616 additional fixed panels. These new panels will allow the Solar Farm to produce more than 600 kilowatts of electricity—enough energy to power up to 30% of the SJU campus in peak conditions, and 6% of its energy annually. This project creates a research opportunity for students and others to compare the performance differences between the two types of panels.

=== Fine arts ===
Fine Arts Programming is a department of CSB and SJU that presents professional performances and art exhibitions from a range of national and international artists, and also supports and enhances the academic mission of CSB-SJU through its programming, resources, and personnel. Events take place in either the Benedicta Arts Center, a performing and visual arts center on the CSB campus, or the Stephen B. Humphrey Theater or Alice R. Rogers Gallery and Target Gallery in the Art Center at SJU.

The Benedicta Arts Center is home to Escher Auditorium, Gorecki Family Theater, Colman Black Box Theater, Darnall Amphitheater, Helgeson Dance Studio, Gorecki Gallery & Gallery Lounge, the BAC Box Office, and classroom and rehearsal spaces, faculty and staff offices, and other music, theater, and art-related spaces.

== Residential life ==
=== Residency requirement ===
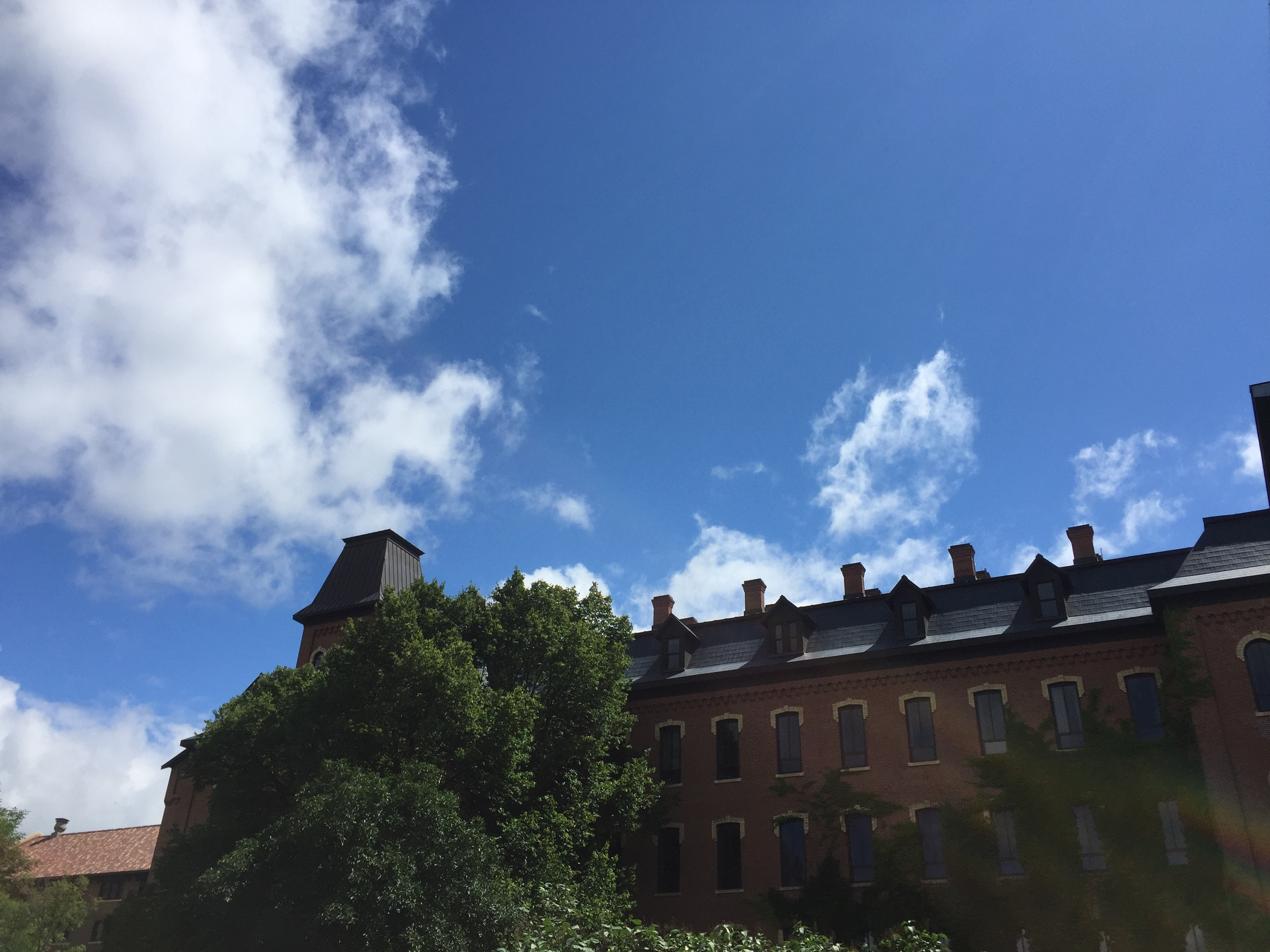
St. Benet Hall

Both Saint John's University and College of Saint Benedict have a four-year residency requirement, which requires students to live on-campus for four years.

=== Saint John's residence halls ===
First-year and sophomore halls consist of two-person dorm rooms. First-year dorms include Saint Thomas Aquinas Hall (Tommy Hall) and Saint Mary Hall. Many sophomores, and some juniors live in four residence halls: St. Bernard (Bernie), St. Boniface (Bonnie), St. Patrick (Pat), and St. Benet as well as the first floor of Tommy Hall. There are also on-campus apartment options for juniors and seniors, including Placid House, Maur House, Virgil Michel House, Saint Vincent Court, Seton Court, and Flynntown Apartments.

=== St. Benedict residence halls ===
First-year residence halls include Corona, Aurora, and Regina which have singles, doubles, and triples for rooms. Sophomores live in three residence halls: Lottie, Brian, and Margretta. Juniors and seniors can live in either the West Apartments (Dominica, Gable, Girgen, Schumacher, Smith, Sohler, and Westkaemper), the East Apartments (Luetmer, McDonald, Wirth, and Zierden), or in the College Avenue Apartments, which consists of two buildings and houses 33 students in one-person or two-person units with private bedrooms. Opened for housing in the fall of 2012, Centennial Commons is the newest addition to CSB's residential facilities. Students can also choose to live in "living communities" such as the Health and Wellness Community, as well as in other campus houses, such as the Rainbow House or the Anne House.

== Rankings ==
The College of Saint Benedict and Saint John's University both consistently rank among the top 100 liberal arts colleges in the country. In 2017, U.S. News & World Report ranked St. John's University as tied for the 77th-best liberal arts college in the United States, and College of St. Benedict as tied for the 87th-best liberal arts college in the United States.

CSB and SJU are two of the nation's best colleges for students seeking great academics, outstanding career preparation, and generous financial aid, according to The Princeton Review's book Colleges That Pay You Back: The 200 Best Value Colleges and What It Takes to Get In – 2015 Edition.

CSB and SJU were rated very highly in MONEY's list of Best Liberal Arts Colleges for 2016 (SJU was No. 3, while CSB was No. 11) and lower as Best Colleges overall (SJU was No. 25, while CSB was No. 47). In the Best Colleges list, CSB and SJU were the only two institutions in Minnesota ranked in the top 50. They also rated well in MONEY's 2015 lists.

== Student life ==
=== Student government ===
The Saint John's Senate (SJS) is SJU's elected student government, and the Saint Ben's Senate (SBS) is CSB's elected student government.

The Senates, while individually governing in the interest of their own student body, work closely together with students, faculty, staff, and university administrators to enhance all aspects of student life.

=== Student-run media ===
All student media are run independently of the CSB and SJU administration.

- The Record: The official SJU newspaper since 1888, The Record also became the official newspaper of CSB in 2001. Its coverage is exclusively focused on CSB/SJU related news and sports. It also features an opinion section, with articles sourced via submissions from students, faculty, and community members. The newspaper is published weekly during the fall and spring semesters and has been recognized among the best weekly college newspapers in Minnesota and the U.S. The Record is a member of the Associated Collegiate Press (ACP) and the Minnesota Newspaper Association, and has won awards from each body for its work. Most recently, it took home second place accolades for General Excellence at the 2019 ACP "Best of the Midwest" awards. All content is written, edited, and designed by student volunteers. All back issues of CSB newspapers are available through Vivarium, the CSB/SJU Digital Image Collection.
- Johnnie Bennie Media: Johnnie Bennie Media is "a student-run organization that strives to provide engaging learning opportunities for students at the College of Saint Benedict and Saint John's University while producing relevant media content for the campus communities. Johnnie Bennie Media's goal is to foster media literacy as part of the organization's partnership with Media Services and Clemens and Alcuin libraries." Alcuin Library's new Dietrich Reinhart Learning Commons features a state-of-the-art video studio, control room, and editing room. Johnnie Bennie Media combines four previously existing student clubs: Johnnie Bennie Campus News, KJNB Radio, Johnnie Bennie Productions, and the StreamTeam.
  - Johnnie Bennie Campus News: Produces a weekly online video news show highlighting CSB/SJU events and information.
  - KJNB: The official CSB/SJU student-run radio station allows students to host an hour-long talk and music-oriented shows. Broadcasts are streamed online, on closed-circuit campus TV Channel 8. When KJNB first started out in 1954 (as KSJU), it was a carrier-current AM station located in the basement of Mary Hall, which broadcast on FM from 1977 to 1988. In 2001, the studio moved to its current location in the lower level of Guild Hall. New automation software was recently purchased "to allow for operating, organizing, and scheduling the streaming audio content.
  - Johnnie Bennie Productions: Creates online video programming that includes talk shows, short films, and documentaries.
  - StreamTeam: A CSB/SJU group that provides live streaming of SJU athletic events."
- Extending the LINK (ETL): A non-profit student-founded and run documentary organization. Every year ETL identifies one under-reported global social justice issue to highlight in their documentary. In the process of filming, a small group of students from ETL travel to the international location to film in the country, and return to CSB and SJU to share their film.

== The Saint John's Bible ==
The Saint John's Bible is an entirely handwritten and illuminated Bible, believed to be the first handwritten and illuminated Bible commissioned by a monastery since the invention of the printing press. It is viewable in The Saint John's Bible Gallery in Alcuin Library and is cared for by the Hill Museum & Manuscript Library (HMML), an independent nonprofit located on the campus of Saint John's.

== Athletics ==
The College of Saint Benedict and Saint John's University are members of the Division III level of the National Collegiate Athletic Association (NCAA), competing in the Minnesota Intercollegiate Athletic Conference (MIAC). Their athletic teams are respectively known as the Bennies and the Johnnies.

== Notable alumni ==
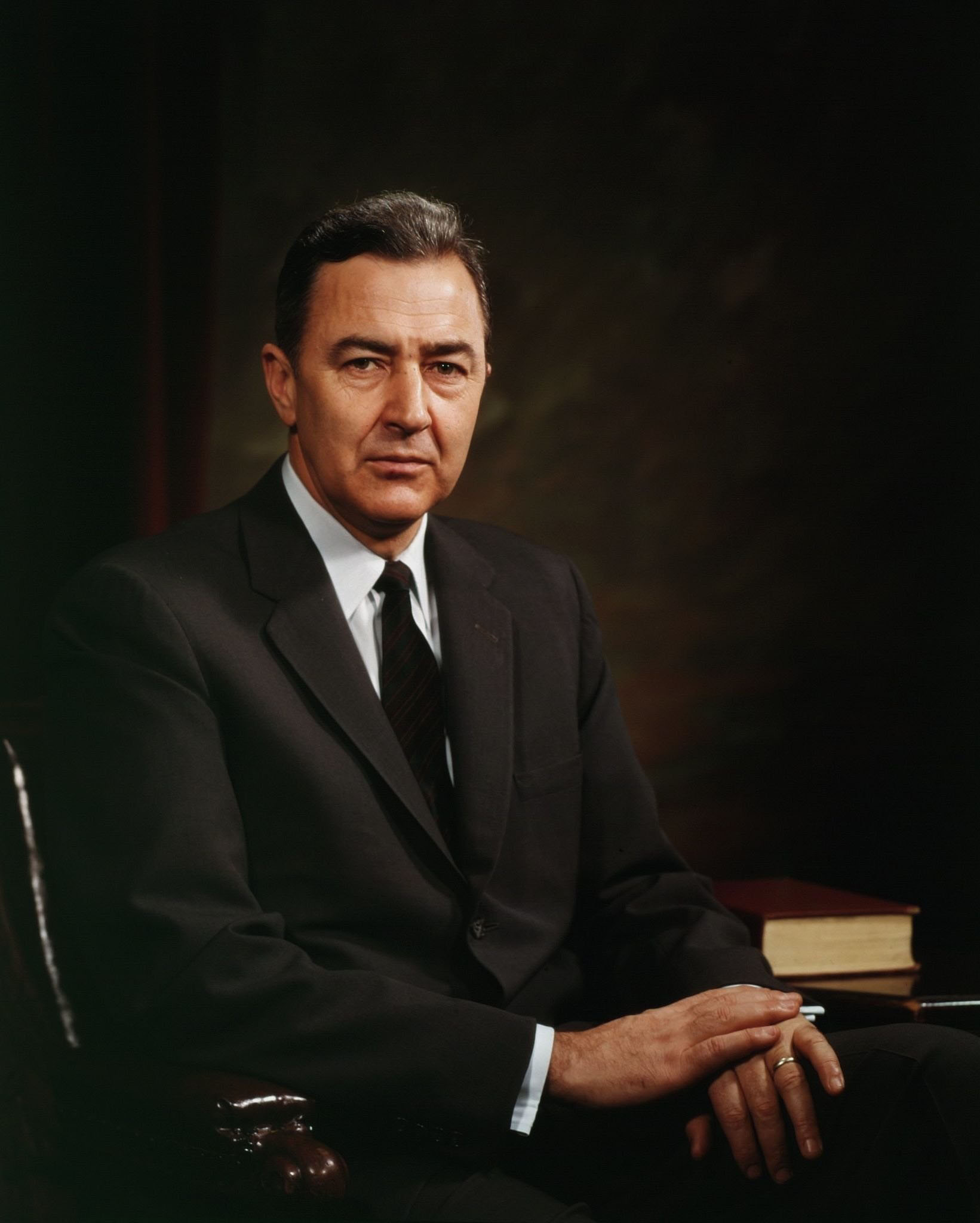
Eugene McCarthy

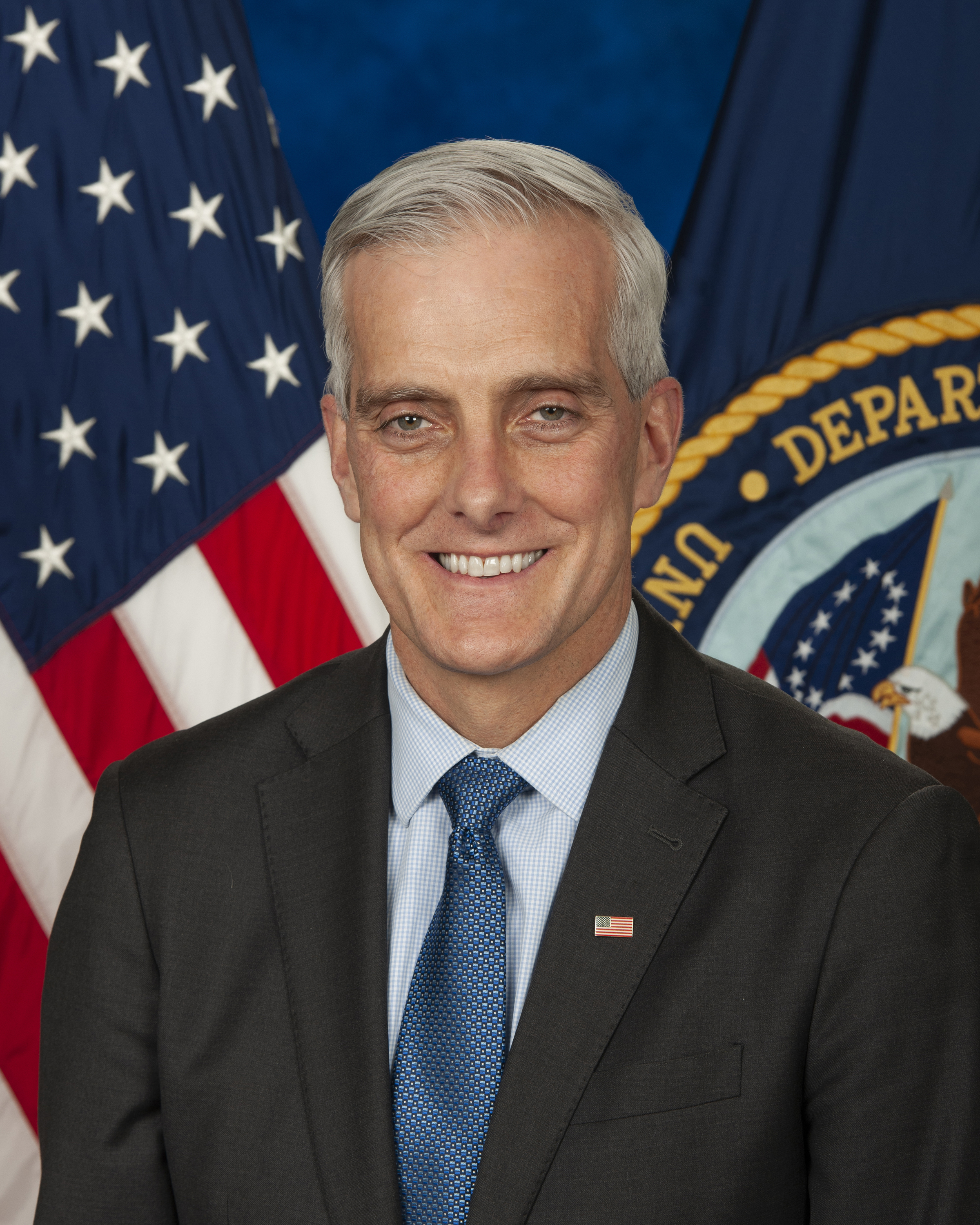
Denis McDonough

- Rick Bell: former Minnesota Vikings running back
- Tom Burnett: hero of United Airlines Flight 93 during the September 11, 2001 attacks; attended SJU for two years, but did not graduate
- Michael Crouser: fine art and commercial photographer
- Edward Devitt ('34): U.S. congressman 1947–49 and U.S. district court judge
- David Durenberger: former U.S. senator
- Canning Fok: deputy chairman, CK Hutchison Holdings Limited, Hong Kong
- Connor Franta: vlogger, Internet personality, writer and entrepreneur; attended SJU for two years, but did not graduate
- Jon Hassler: novelist
- Patrick Hicks ('92): novelist, poet
- Vedie Himsl ('38): baseball player and coach
- Mark Kennedy: former U.S. congressman and university president
- Bill Kling: co-founder and president of American Public Media
- John Knauf: justice of the North Dakota Supreme Court (attended but graduated elsewhere)
- Franklin J. Knoll: Minnesota state legislator, lawyer, and judge
- Tom Love: owner, founder, and chairman of Love's Travel Stops & Country Stores (did not graduate)
- January Yusuf Makamba: Tanzanian CCM politician and member of Parliament for Bumbuli constituency
- Eugene McCarthy ('35): politician, poet, and long-time congressman from Minnesota; served in the United States House of Representatives 1949–59 and the United States Senate 1959–71
- John McCutcheon: Grammy-winning folk musician
- Denis McDonough ('92): chief of staff to President Barack Obama. United States Secretary of Veterans Affairs under President Joe Biden
- John McDowell: National Football League player
- John McNally, a.k.a. "Johnny Blood": National Football League Hall of Famer
- Larry Millett: journalist and author
- Paul M. Nakasone ('86): U.S. Army general, commander, United States Army Cyber Command; director, National Security Agency
- Lino Rulli ('93): Emmy-winning producer and radio host (The Catholic Guy)
- Michael D. Ryan: U.S. Marine Corps lieutenant, recipient of two Purple Hearts and a Bronze Star (Vietnam), Arizona state supreme court justice
- Richard Sabers ('60): South Dakota supreme court justice
- Matt Schnobrich: 2008 Summer Olympics bronze medalist in rowing
- George Sinner ('50): governor of North Dakota 1985–92
- Erik Sommer ('00): contemporary artist
- Stephen Sommers: movie director
- Mark Vande Hei ('89): astronaut
- Jack Webb: television producer, star of Dragnet
- Richard Carlbom ('04): chair of the Minnesota Democratic-Farmer-Labor Party since 2025

== Notable alumnae ==
- Kimberly M. Blaeser ('77): author; 2015-2016 Wisconsin Poet Laureate
- Elizabeth A. Hayden ('68): district court judge, Minnesota 1986–2009
- Baulu Kuan, OSB: Chinese-American artist and curator
- Ann Lenczewski: politician and former member of the Minnesota House of Representatives (DFL)
- Mary Ellen Otremba: politician and former member of the Minnesota House of Representatives (DFL)
- Michele Specht: actress and comedian
- Yuko Taniguchi ('98): poet and author

== Notable faculty and staff ==
- Miguel H. Díaz: theology professor, United States ambassador to the Holy See (2009–12)
- John Gagliardi: regents professor (1953–2018, died 2018) and football coach (1953–2012)
- Columba Stewart: executive director of Hill Museum & Manuscript Library, 2016 Guggenheim Fellowship awardee
- Axel Theimer: emeritus professor of music

== See also ==
- List of colleges and universities in Minnesota
- Saint John's Preparatory School
