= New Year's Eve =

Last day of the Gregorian year

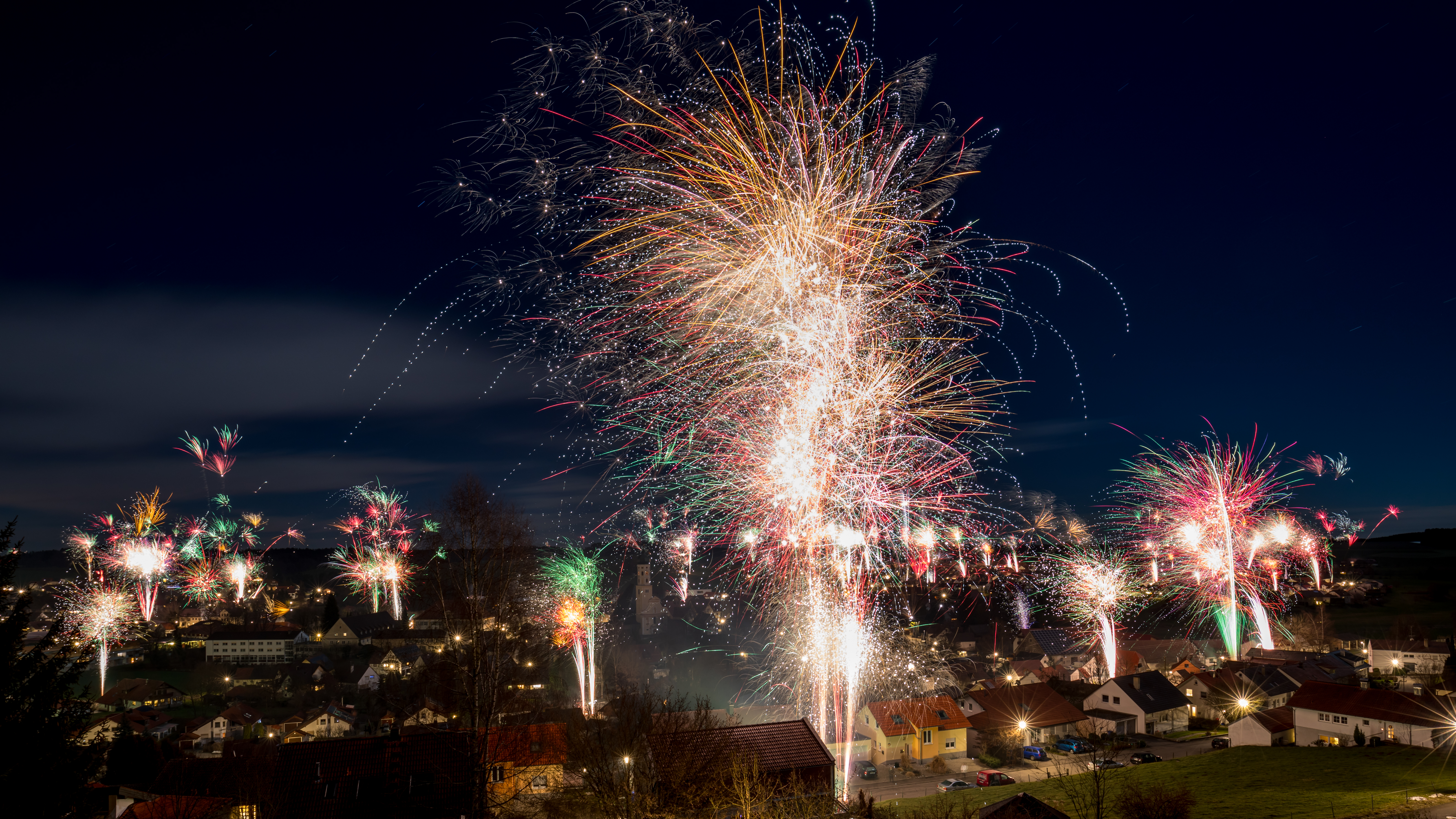
- New Year celebration in Eberhardzell, Germany, 2018
- Observed by: Users of the Gregorian calendar
- Type: International
- Significance: The last day of the year in the Gregorian calendar
- Celebrations: Reflection; late-night partying; family gatherings; feasting; gift exchanges; fireworks; countdowns; watchnight services; social gatherings, during which participants may dance, eat, consume alcoholic beverages, and watch or light fireworks
- Date: 31 December
- Next time: 31 December 2026
- Frequency: Annual
- Related to: Hogmanay (Scotland); Calennig (Wales); Shchedryi Vechir (Ukraine); Ambang/Malam Tahun Baharu/Baru (Brunei, Indonesia, Malaysia, Singapore); Yangi Yil, Yılbaşı arifesi, Yeni İl ərəfəsi (Uzbekistan, Turkey and Azerbaijan); Karamu (African diaspora); Silvester (Austria, Bosnia and Herzegovina, Croatia, Czech Republic, France, Germany, Hungary, Israel, Italy, Latvia, Liechtenstein, Luxembourg, Poland, Russia, Serbia, Slovakia, Slovenia, Switzerland); Réveillon (Algeria, Angola, Brazil, France, Macau, Morocco, Mozambique, Portugal, Romania, Tunisia, Wallonia, and French-speaking locations in North America); Kanun Novogo Goda (Russia); Ōmisoka (Japan); Pele ga Ngwaga o Mosha (Botswana); Nochevieja (lit. Old Night) (Spain and other countries where Spanish is mostly spoken); New Year's Day

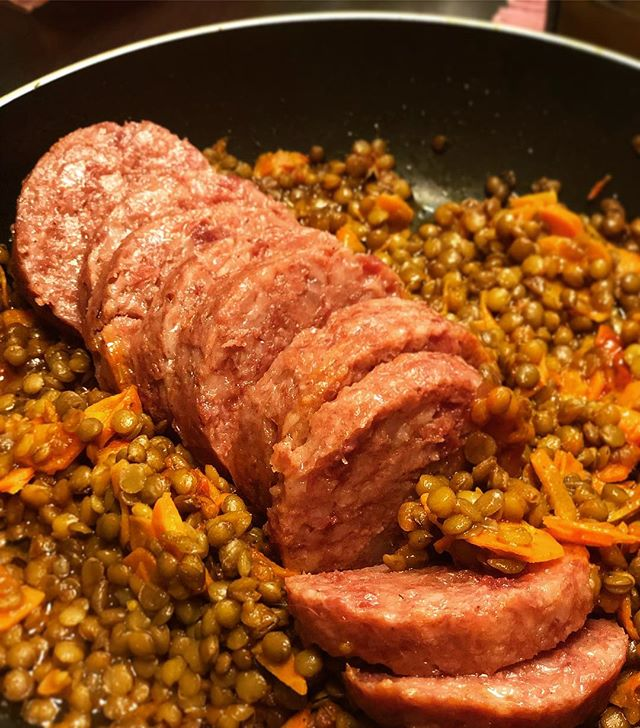
Italian cotechino and lentils, a typical New Year's Eve dinner dish

New Year's Eve in the Gregorian calendar refers to the evening—or commonly the entire day—of the last day of the year: 31 December. In many countries, New Year's Eve is celebrated with dancing, eating, drinking, and watching or lighting fireworks. Many Christians attend a watchnight service to mark the occasion. New Year's Eve celebrations generally continue into New Year's Day, 1 January, past midnight.

The local time zone determines the advent of the New Year; the first places to welcome the New Year are west of the International Date Line: the Line Islands (part of Kiribati), Samoa and Tonga, in the Pacific Ocean. In contrast, American Samoa, Baker Island and Howland Island (part of the United States Minor Outlying Islands) are among the last.

== By region ==
=== Africa ===
==== Algeria ====
In Algeria, New Year's Eve is usually celebrated with family and friends. In the largest cities, there are fireworks at midnight. The Martyrs' Memorial is the main attraction during the celebration, while some Algerians prefer celebrate outside the country, generally in Tunis or Paris.

At 8 PM (AST), the President's message of greetings is read on TV. The EPTV network airs an entertainment show, with different hosts and guests.

==== Egypt ====
In Egypt, New Year's Eve is celebrated with fireworks and often evening parties with friends and family.

==== Ghana ====
In Ghana, Ghanaians celebrate New Year's Eve by going to church; others go to nightclubs, pubs or take to the streets to celebrate. At midnight, fireworks are displayed across various cities of Ghana, especially in Accra and Tema.

==== Morocco ====
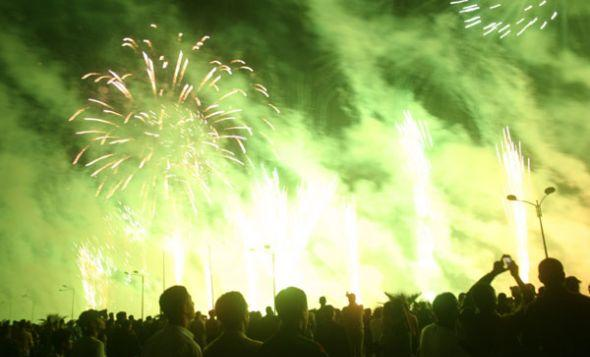
Casablanca fireworks display

In Morocco, New Year's Eve is celebrated by some in the company of family and friends. Moroccans get together to eat cake, dance, and laugh.

==== Nigeria ====
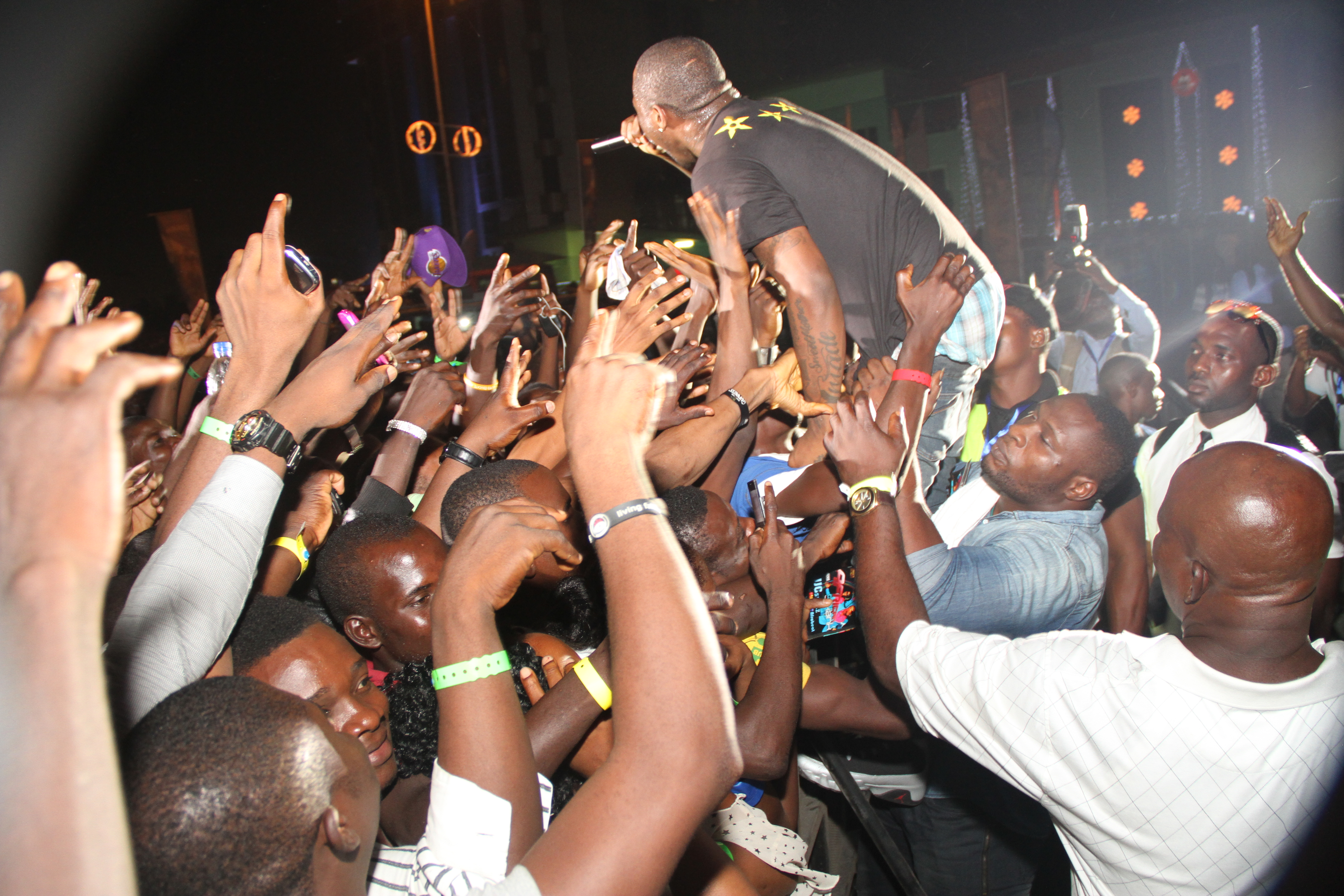
HKN's Davido entertaining the crowd at the Lagos Countdown 2012 in Nigeria

In Nigeria, Nigerians often Celebrate the New Year's Eve by going to church; others go to nightclubs and parties organized by individuals, communities, and other organizations.

In Lagos, a year-end festival known as Lagos Countdown (later renamed One Lagos Fiesta) was first held in 2012, as part of an effort to establish tourism-oriented New Year's festivities more in line with those of other major metropolitan areas.

==== Rwanda ====
In Rwanda, Rwandans celebrate New Year's Eve by going to church, taking part in social gatherings and organizing family activities. The services usually start from 6 pm for the Roman Catholic church and 10 pm for the Protestants. At 00:00, at midnight, the president delivers an end-of-year address which is broadcast live on many radio and television stations. Fireworks were introduced in recent years, with the most significant displays happening at Kigali Convention Centre, Rebero Hill, Mount Kigali.

==== South Africa ====
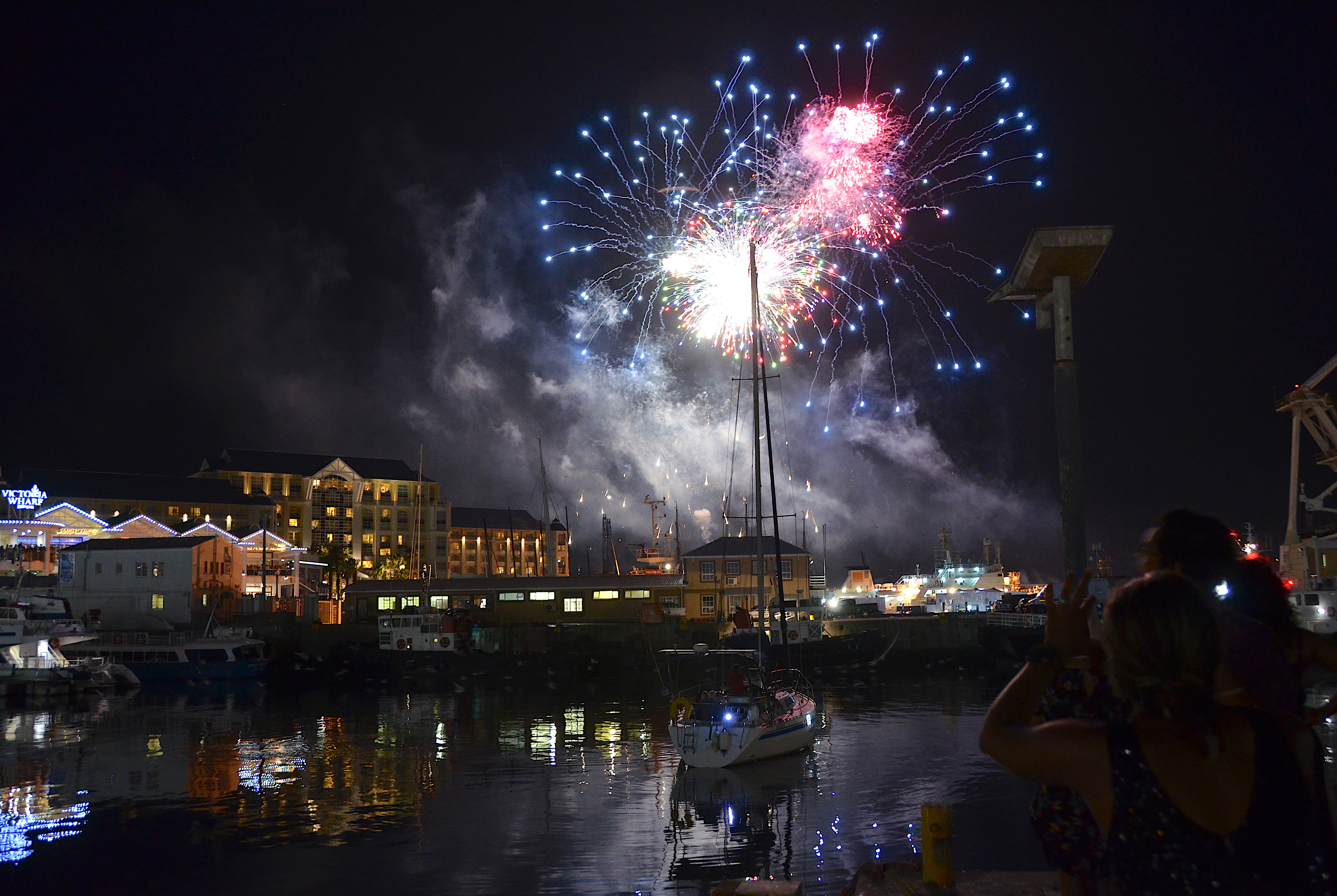
Fireworks in Cape Town 2017.

In South Africa, South Africans vote on a top ten music countdown before 31 December. When the countdown reaches number one, the song with the most votes plays on all the country's radio stations. Fireworks are lit all around South Africa. South Africans engage in occasional drinking and braais.

==== South Sudan ====
In South Sudan, South Sudanese attend church services at many churches in Juba. The service begins at 9 pm. At the stroke of midnight, the famous carol, "Hark! The Herald Angels Sing" is sung to mark the end and beginning of the year with a blessing. The service ends at 12:30 am.

==== Tunisia ====
In Tunisia, Tunisians celebrate by spending the evening in restaurants and hotels and exchange gifts and flowers, or travel outside Tunisia to spend New Year's Eve in a European country. But most Tunisians prefer to celebrate it at home in a family evening with relatives and friends.

Tunisians buy cakes or prepare them at home, in addition to holding dinner banquets, as roast chicken remains the main dish for this occasion, and staying up until midnight to eat cake as the first moments of the new year arrive.

In recent years, the popular Tunisian film Choufli Hal, New Year's Eve is broadcast every year, ending just minutes before the new year. This has become an annual tradition.

=== Asia ===
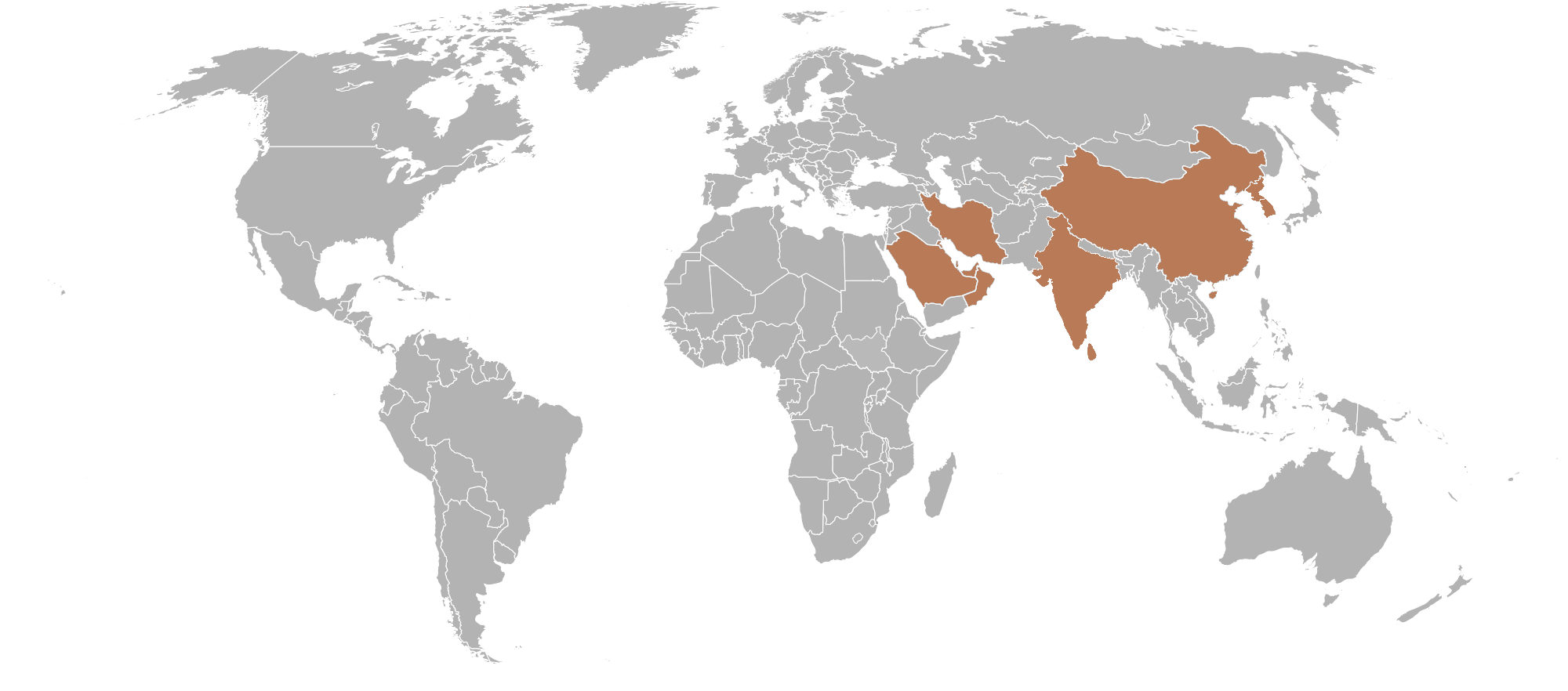
Some Asian countries where the main celebrations of the New Year are on a day other than 1 January.

==== Azerbaijan ====
The Gregorian calendar is still in force after Azerbaijan became an independent republic, and 1 January is celebrated as a day off. The day before, 31 December, is also marked as International Solidarity Day of Azerbaijanis, marking the double anniversary of that day in 1989 when the local residents took down the Soviet–Iranian border in then-Nakhichevan ASSR to reunite with Iranian Azerbaijanis south of the border, as well as the Istanbul-held first World Congress of Azerbaijanis which tackled issues regarding the Azeri expat communities.

Celebrations of the holiday are influenced from its Soviet history, at midnight the national anthem is played on all TV stations following the message of the President of Azerbaijan produced by state channel AzTV.

==== Bangladesh ====
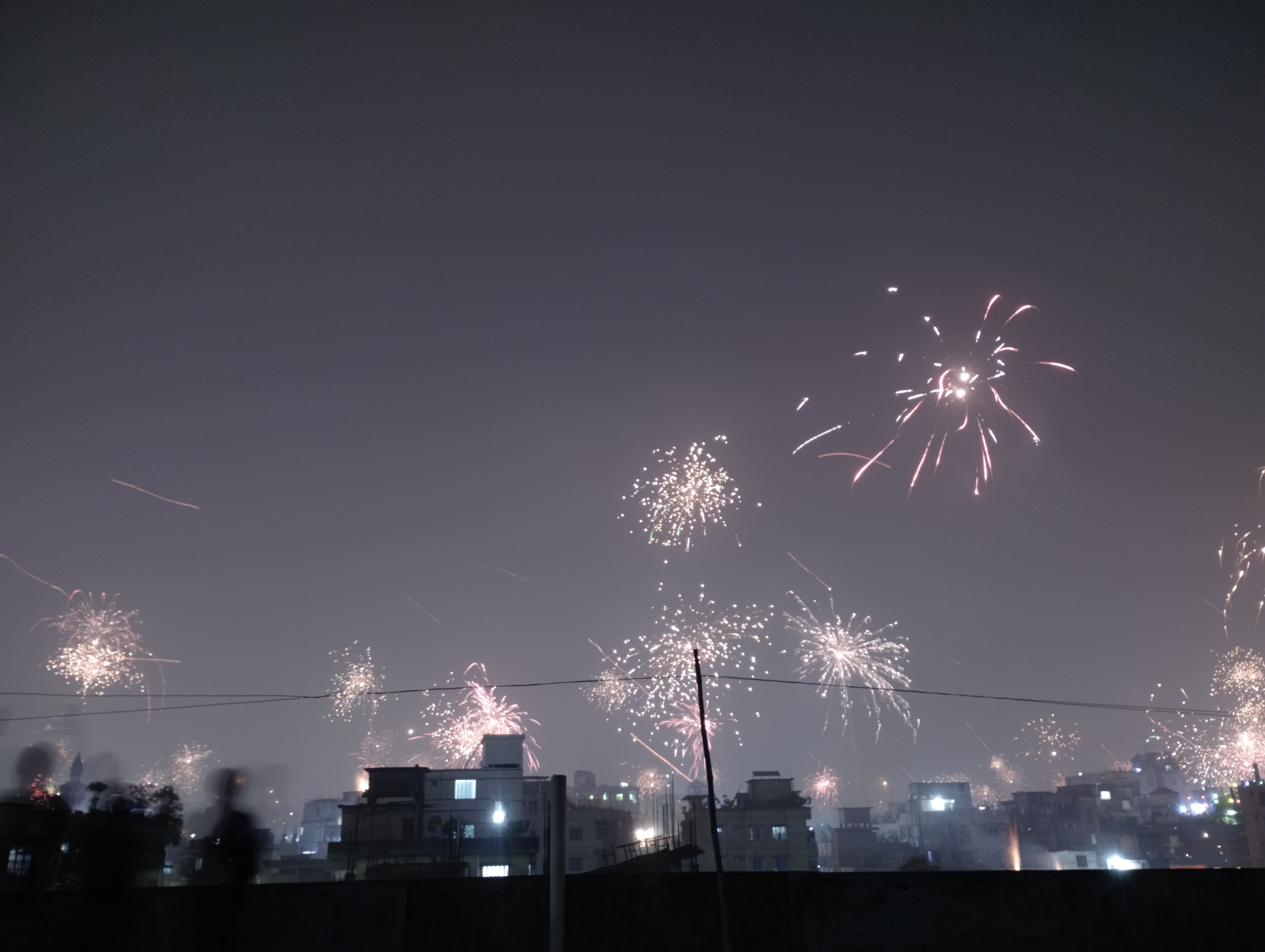
New Year celebration in Dhaka, Bangladesh.

In Bangladesh, public celebrations of the Gregorian new year (Pohela Boishakh—the new year of the Bengali calendar—is celebrated in April), also known as 31st night, are centered upon major cities and beaches (including the capital city of Dhaka, and Cox's Bazar Beach), and public events such as parties hosted by hotels. In major cities such as Dhaka, there are restrictions placed on New Year's celebrations for safety, security, and environmental reasons, including bans on fireworks, the flying of lanterns, and organizing outdoor cultural events such as concerts.

==== Hong Kong ====
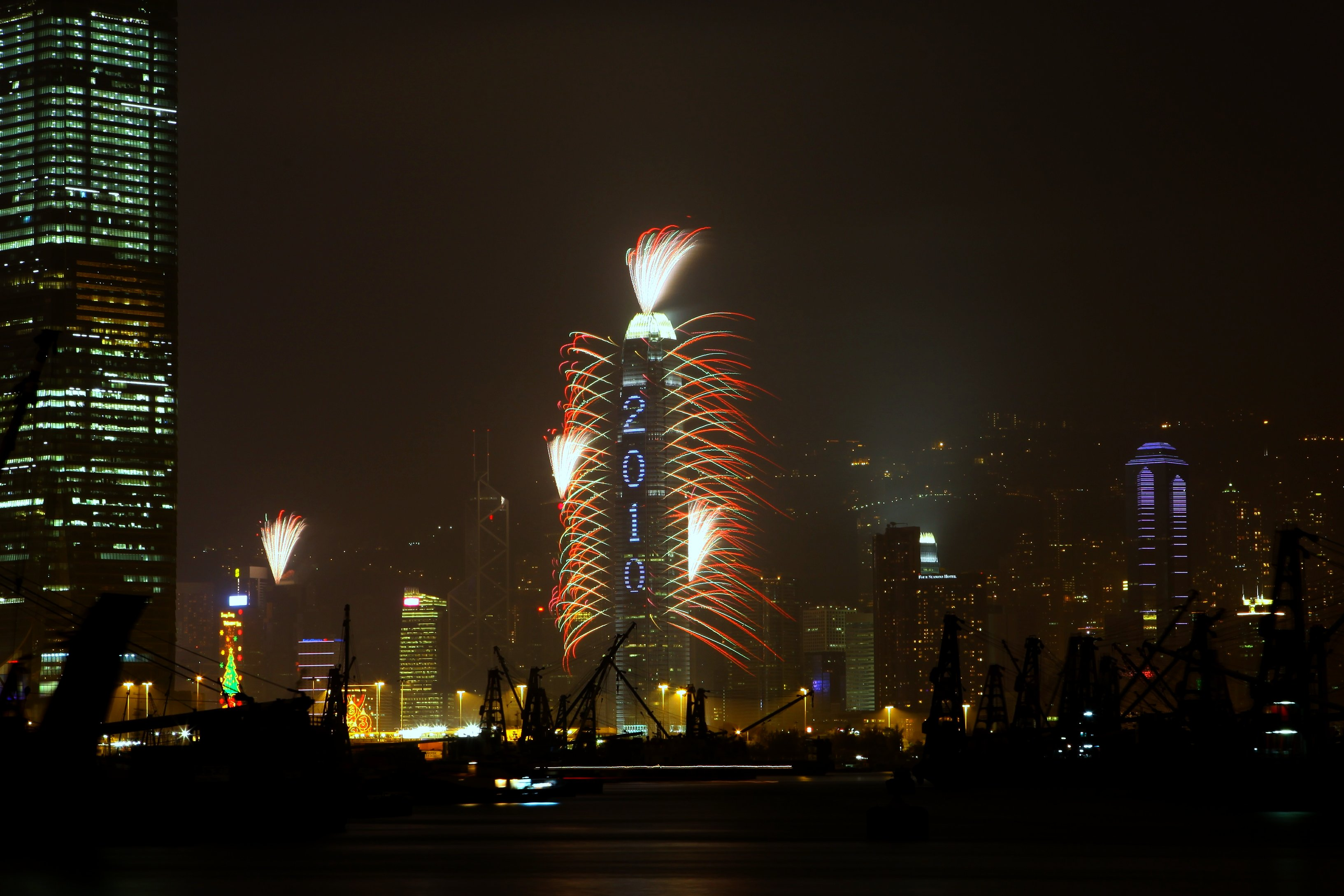
Fireworks fired from Two International Finance Centre to mark the year 2010.

In Hong Kong, many gather in shopping districts like Central, Causeway Bay and Tsim Sha Tsui. A special edition of A Symphony of Lights —the nightly light and sound show conducted across the buildings of Hong Kong's Victoria Harbour—is held on New Year's Eve, incorporating a fireworks show.

From 1993 to 2014, the Times Square shopping centre in Causeway Bay hosted New Year's Eve festivities featuring the "lowering" of an apple (via 22 m (72 ft) of signage), in imitation of the ball drop at New York City's Times Square. The countdown event was discontinued in 2015 in favor of other events over the holiday season.

==== India ====
In India, New Year's Eve is a blend of modern celebrations and traditional festivities. Metropolitans like Kochi, Chennai, Mumbai, Delhi, Bengaluru, Hyderabad, Pune and Kolkata have parties, concerts, and colorful fireworks displays as part of the celebrations to attract crowds of people. Goa and Manali celebrate the day with beach parties and winter festivals. So, many people celebrate the festival by praying and performing rituals, since India is a culturally diverse country.

New Year's Eve celebrations are the biggest in large cities, and include Goa's beaches and Park Street, Kolkata. Other cities such as New Delhi and Mumbai also celebrate extravagantly.

==== Israel ====
New Year's Eve has been observed in Israel since the introduction of the Gregorian calendar in 1918; it is referred to as Silvester to distinguish it from the Jewish New Year, Rosh Hashanah, which falls in either September or October on the Gregorian calendar. It is largely celebrated through social gatherings and parties. The New Year's holiday has historically attracted a negative stigma among parts of the Israeli Jewish population due to its connection to Pope Sylvester I—who is widely considered to have been an antisemite. As a result, celebrations have historically been modest in comparison to other countries. In December 2014, wearables manufacturer Jawbone published a report estimating that only 67.4% of Israelis were awake at midnight on New Year's Eve in 2013, and most people only stayed up as late as 12:45 a.m. IST.

During the era of Mandatory Palestine in the early-1930s, promotional material for formal New Year's Eve parties and masquerade balls were targeted primarily towards Arabic and English-speaking residents (by contrast, posters for Hanukkah parties were written in Hebrew). These parties also became popular among German and Austrian Jews that had emigrated to avoid the rise of Nazi Germany. The increasing popularity of Silvester faced criticism from the Orthodox population, including the Hapoel HaMizrachi, who considered them contrary to Zionist values. In 1934, it was reported that the municipal council of Tel Aviv had passed a resolution to ban Silvester parties, calling them "contrary to the spirit and traditions of the people of Israel". However, reported efforts to ban the holiday were unsuccessful or left unenforced, and it continued to increase in popularity—especially among secular populations.

Following the post-Soviet aliyah, Novy God was imported into Israel by emigrants. The observance was initially obscure outside of Israel's Russian Jewish community, and also faced stigma from those who mistook its traditions for being Christmas or Silvester. In the mid-2010s, a campaign was launched to promote awareness of the holiday among the 1.5 generation of immigrants, as well as non-Russian residents. By the 2010s, public awareness of Novy God had increased; Prime Minister Benjamin Netanyahu began to acknowledge Novy God in his holiday greetings, and it became more common for retailers to stock Novy God-related goods and hold promotions for the holiday. In a 2020 survey, 72% of Israelis surveyed stated they were familiar with the holiday, while 54% did not perceive Novy God to be part of the country's culture.

==== Japan ====
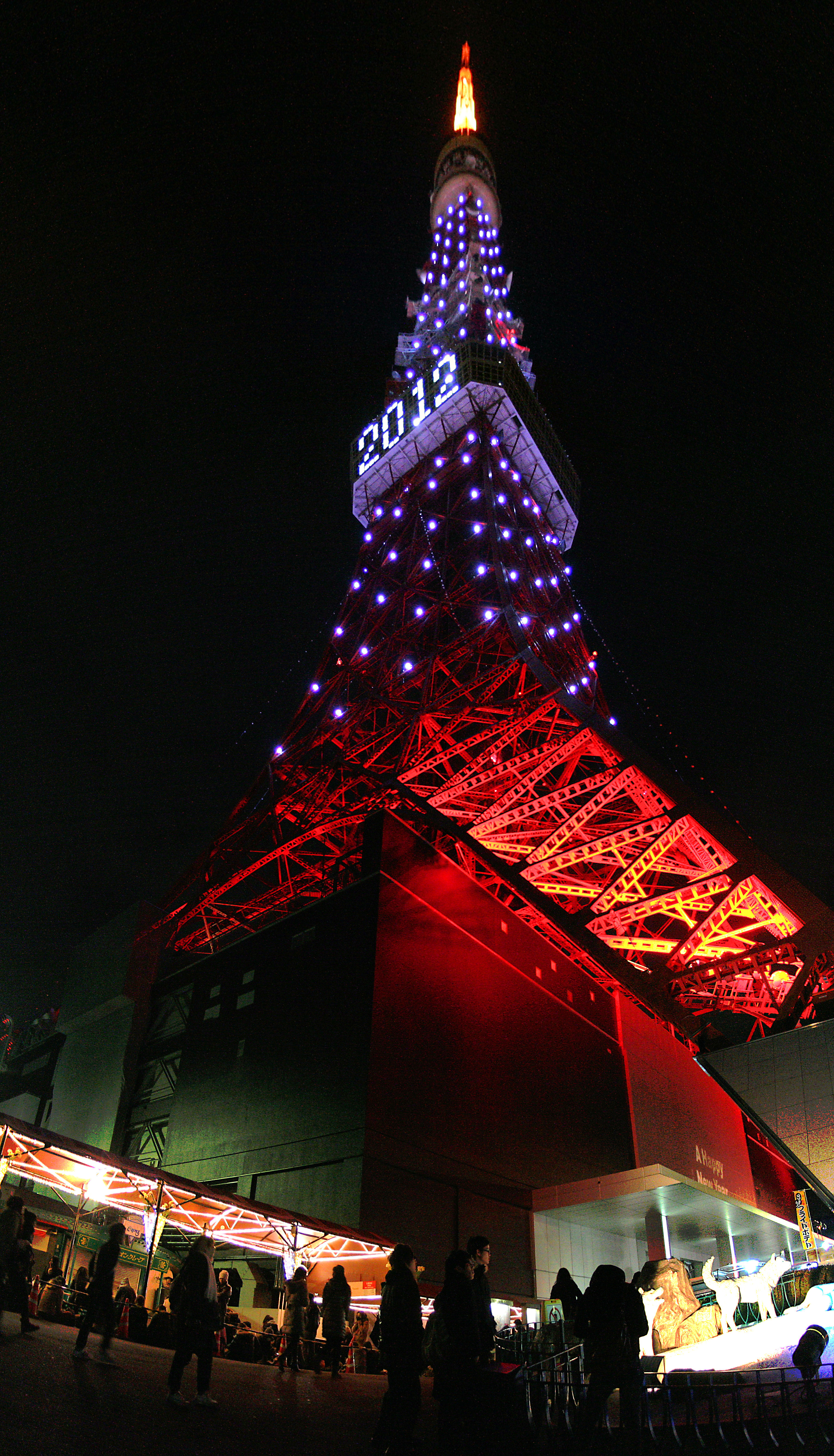
Tokyo Tower on New Year's Eve, 2012

In Japan, New Year's Eve is used to prepare for and welcome Toshigami (年神), the New Year's god. Japanese clean their homes and prepare Kadomatsu or Shimenawa to welcome the god before New Year's Eve. Buddhist temples ring their bells 108 times at midnight in the traditional Joya no Kane (除夜の鐘). The rings represent the 108 elements of bonō (煩悩), mental states that lead Japanese to take unwholesome actions.

In most cities and urban areas across Japan, New Year's Eve celebrations are usually accompanied by concerts, countdowns, fireworks and other events. In Tokyo, revelers gather at the Zojoji Temple in Minato, release helium balloons with New Year's wishes, and watch the lighting of Tokyo Tower and Tokyo Skytree with a year number displayed on the observatory at the stroke of midnight. Shibuya Crossing formerly hosted a gathering of revellers at midnight, but this ended in 2020 due to the COVID-19 pandemic, as well as a subsequent crackdown on gatherings around Halloween and New Year's Eve due to issues with overtourism and public intoxication.

Since 1951, NHK has traditionally broadcast the Kōhaku Uta Gassen ("Red and White Song Battle") on New Year's Eve, a music competition where two teams of popular musicians (the red and white teams, whose performances contain female and male vocalists respectively) perform songs. The winning team is determined by a panel of judges, audience members at the NHK Hall in Tokyo, and televotes. The special was previously one of Japan's most-watched television programs overall; its audience has since declined, and hit a record low of 34.3% in the Video Research ratings in 2021.

From 1996 to 2022, the talent agency Johnny & Associates organised Johnny's Countdown—a concert event at the Tokyo Dome televised by Fuji Television. In the wake of sexual abuse allegations surrounding the agency's founder, a new agency known as Starto Entertainment was formed in 2023 to take on Johnny & Associates' roster; in 2025, Starto began hosting its own concert, which is streamed on its service Family Club, and made available on Netflix following the event.

The Japan Record Awards were previously held on New Year's Eve from 1959 to 2006, but have since been held on 30 December.

A more recent tradition in Japan has been combat sports supercards; the Saitama Super Arena has hosted an MMA event on New Year's Eve since 2001, which was initially promoted by Pride Fighting Championships. After its dissolution and sale to UFC, Yarennoka! was organized by former Pride executives in 2007, while its successor Dream held the event each year until its final event in 2012. These cards have also featured kickboxing matches, promoted by groups such as Glory and K-1. Rizin Fighting Federation took over the tradition beginning in 2015 with its inaugural event.

==== Kazakhstan ====
In Central Asia, such as Kazakhstan, New Year's Eve celebrations were inherited from Soviet traditions; thus they are similar to those of Russia. An example of such traditions would be the playing of the national anthem at midnight and the presidential address before it.

==== Korea ====
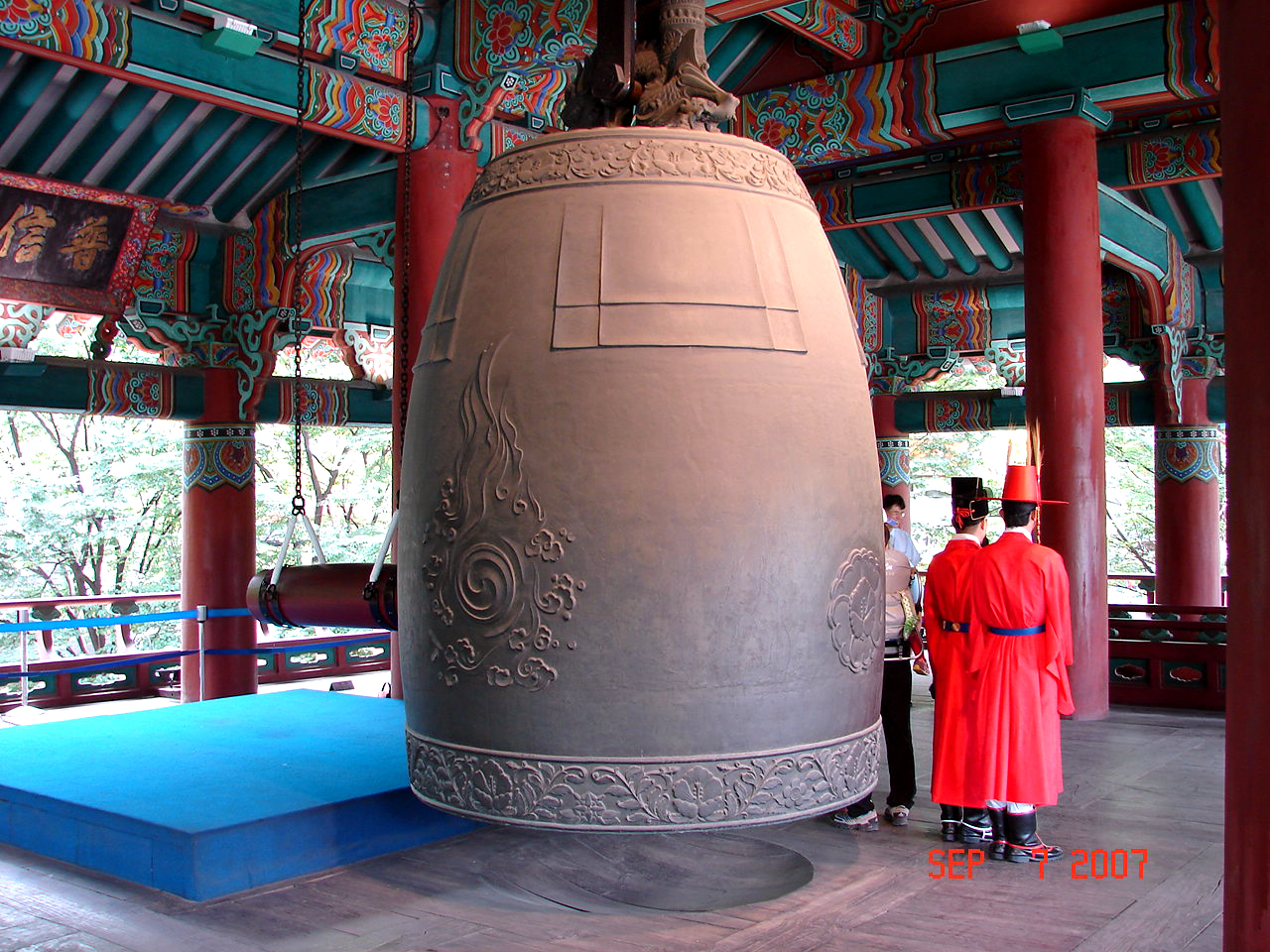
Many South Korean gather at Bosingak in Seoul to celebrate the New Year.

Although the traditional Korean New Year (Seollal) is typically a more important holiday in both North and South Korea, the 31 December New Year's Eve of the Gregorian calendar is also celebrated. Most cities and urban areas in both Koreas host New Year's Eve gatherings.

In South Korea, two of the biggest celebrations take place in the capital of Seoul: the ringing of Bosingak bell 33 times at midnight and fireworks display at Myeong-dong, and an LED laser light show and fireworks display at the Lotte World Tower in Songpa-gu. Television networks KBS and SBS both broadcast award shows, the KBS Drama Awards and SBS Drama Awards, to honor achievements in the television dramas aired by the networks. Until 2022 South Koreans calculated their age using the East Asian age reckoning method, with all South Koreans adding a year to their age at midnight of the New Year (of the Gregorian, not the Korean calendar), the government finally ended the practice for 2023 and onwards.

In Pyongyang, the capital of North Korea, the chimes of the clock at the Grand People's Study House and the national fireworks display along Kim Il-sung Square, Juche Tower and the surrounding areas signal the start of the New Year. The celebration in Pyongyang, however, also marks the beginning of the North Korean calendar or the Juche Year, which is based on 15 April 1912, Kim Il Sung's date of birth, the celebrations are more recent in origin with the fireworks displays dating from 2013. For 2018–19, Kim Il Sung Square hosted a concert performance by the state Moranbong Band, midnight fireworks, and a drone show. Since 2022, the national New Year's Eve concert and main fireworks display is held at the Rungrado 1st of May Stadium.

==== Lebanon ====
In Lebanon, Lebanese people celebrate New Year's Eve with a dinner attended by family and friends. The dinner features traditional dishes such as tabouli, hummus, kibbi, and other Lebanese foods. These celebrations could also take place in restaurants and clubs. Game shows are also organized where contestants can try to win money. The countdown to New Year's is broadcast through the leading TV channel and the celebrations usually continue until sunrise. Fireworks are lit throughout the night.

==== Malaysia ====
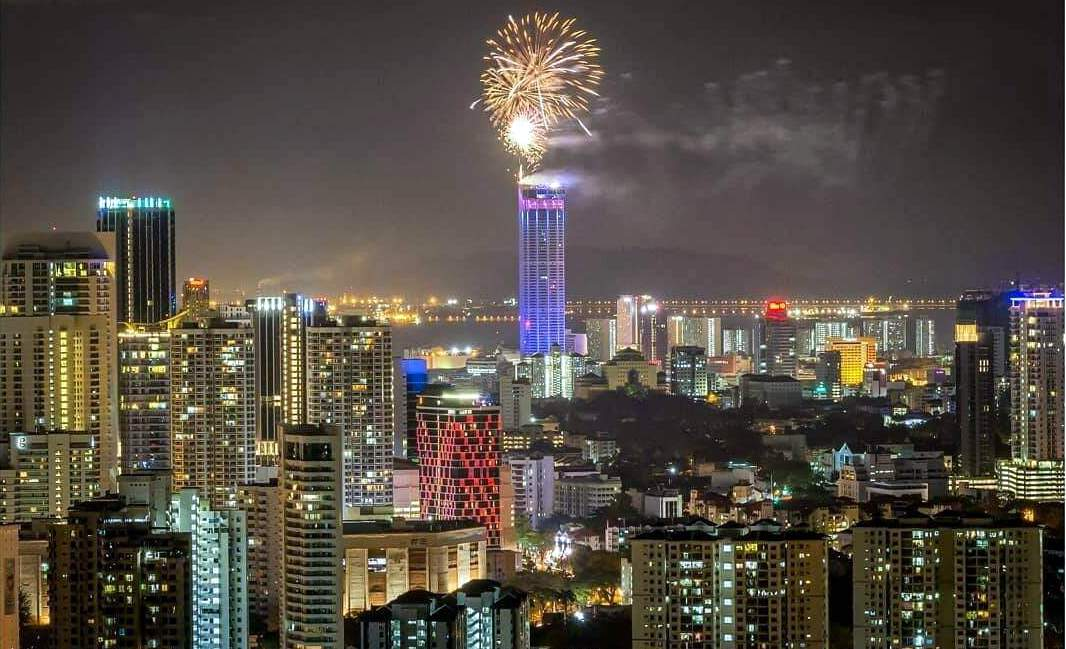
Fireworks in George Town, Penang on 1 January 2018

Ambang Tahun Baru, a celebration sponsored by the government was held at Merdeka Square, the field opposite the Sultan Abdul Samad Building in the Malaysian capital of Kuala Lumpur in the early days. The event was broadcast live on government as well as private TV stations at those times. The countdown is now broadcast live on Government television from Putrajaya and the Broadcasting Centre in which the concert is held and fireworks are displayed at the Petronas Towers.

There are New Year countdown parties in major cities such as George Town, Shah Alam and Kuching, typically organized by the private sector in these cities.

==== Mongolia ====
Mongolians began celebrating the Gregorian New Year in the Socialist period, influenced by the former Soviet Union. As a modern tradition, New Year's Day is a public holiday: one of the biggest holidays of the year. They celebrate New Year's Eve with families. It is common, just as in the former Soviet Union, for the National Anthem of Mongolia to be played at midnight on television following the holiday address by the President of Mongolia.

==== Pakistan ====
New Year's Eve is usually celebrated with fireworks in big cities (e.g. Lahore, Karachi, and Islamabad) with musical nights and concerts also held.

In major urban centers such as Karachi, Lahore, and Islamabad, New Year's Eve is marked by a range of public and private celebrations. Public events frequently feature family-oriented fireworks displays, while urban youth celebrations include various gatherings and, in some cases, unauthorized street stunts such as one-wheeling.

==== Philippines ====
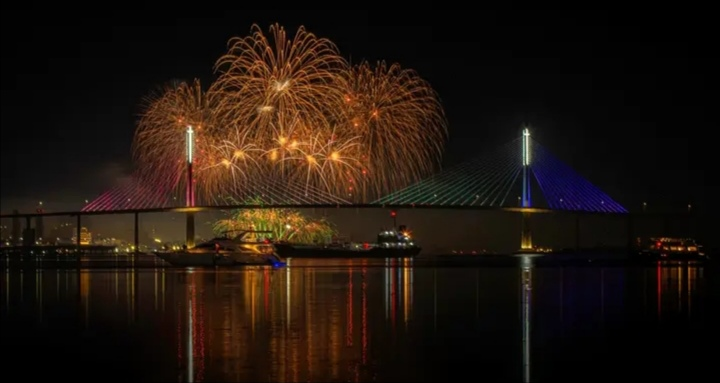
Fireworks in Cebu City with main bridge of CCLEX, venued at Plaza Independencia 2025.

In the Philippines, New Year's Eve (Bisperas ng Bagong Taon) is a special non-working holiday (except for 2021 and 2022, in which it was a special working holiday), and Filipinos usually celebrate in the company of family or close friends. Traditionally, most households would attend church for year-end services and afterwards, host or attend an abundant midnight feast called Medianoche. Typical dishes include pancit (a noodle dish meant to symbolize having a long life) and hamón (dry-cured ham), while lechón (roasted pig) is usually prepared as is barbecued food and various desserts. Some refrain from serving chicken, as their scratching and pecking for food is said to be an unlucky idiom for a hand-to-mouth existence.

Many opt to wear new, bright, or colorful clothes with circular patterns, such as polka dots, or display sweets and twelve round fruits in the belief that circles attract money, while candies represent a sweeter year ahead. Several customs must be done exactly at midnight: scattering coins to increase wealth in the coming year, jumping to increase height, or the Spanish custom of eating twelve grapes, one for each month of the year. Many Filipinos also light firecrackers and fireworks, and make loud noises by blowing on cardboard or plastic horns called torotot, banging on pots and pans, playing loud music, blowing car horns, or by firing bamboo cannons. This is an apotropaic ritual, as the din is believed to scare away bad luck and evil spirits.

Although many Filipinos typically spend their New Year's Eve at their family homes, in some urban areas, many New Year's Eve parties and countdown celebrations are also hosted by the private sector with the help of the local government. These parties, which include balls hosted by hotels, usually display their own fireworks and are also well-attended.

==== Saudi Arabia ====
Until 2016, Saudi Arabia used the Umm al-Qura calendar—which is based on astronomical calculations—for administrative purposes. The Committee for the Promotion of Virtue and the Prevention of Vice (CPVPV, the Saudi religious police) also enforced a ban on public celebrations of the Gregorian New Year as per a religious edict, and could fine shops for offering New Year's-related products and confiscate them. However, the religious police did not go after individual citizens holding private celebrations.

The power of the CPVPV was curtailed by the 2016 reforms of Mohammed bin Salman. The country also began to base the salaries of public sector employees on the Gregorian calendar as a cost savings measure, while retaining the Islamic calendar for religious purposes. In 2019, the capital Riyadh introduced a new winter entertainment festival known as Riyadh Season, in support of Saudi Vision 2030. The inaugural festival included New Year's festivities centred upon Boulevard Riyadh City, including fireworks and a concert at Mohammed Abdo Arena featuring major Arabic music performers.

==== Singapore ====
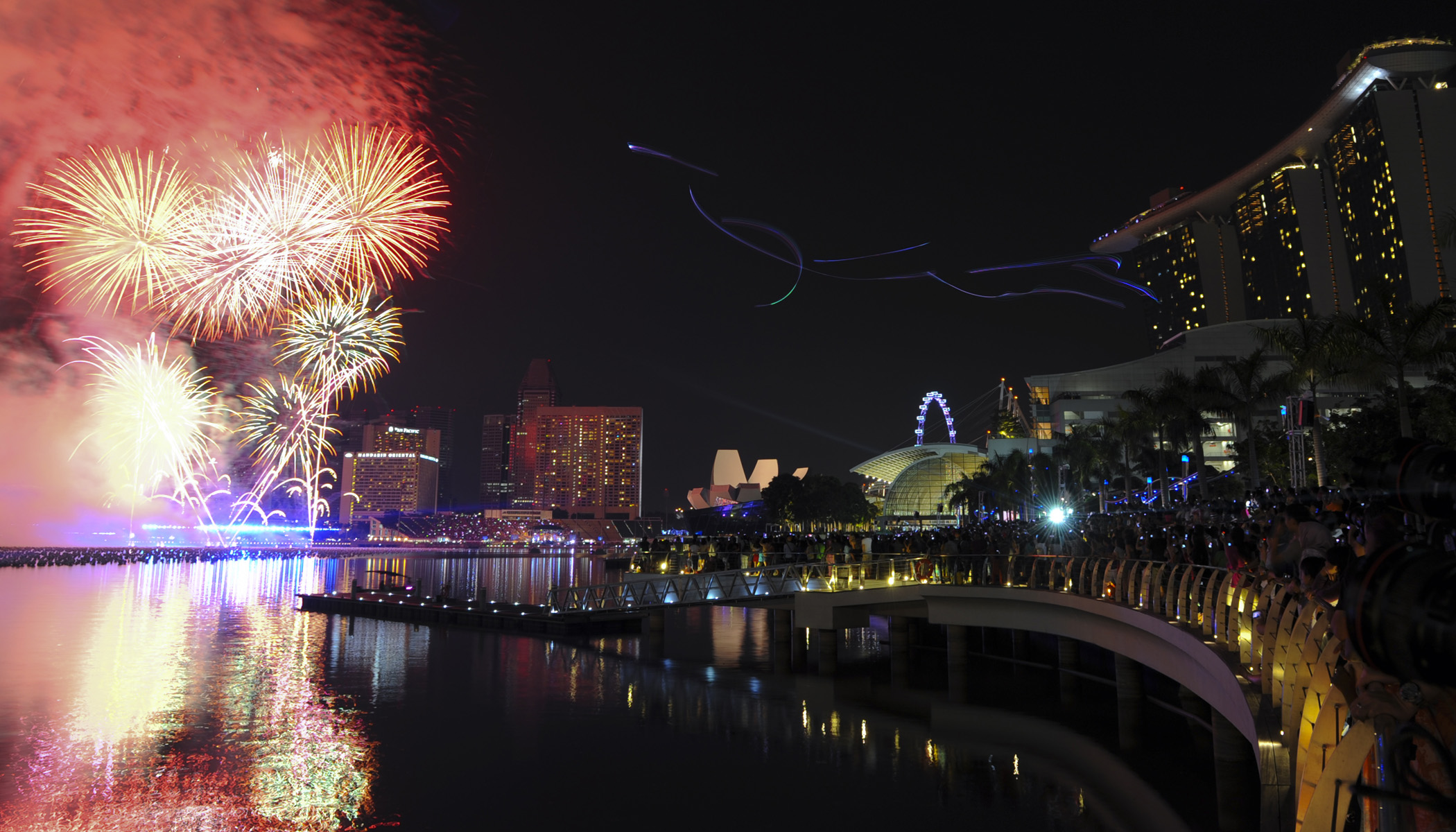
A midnight fireworks show in Marina Bay, Singapore, welcoming 2012.

In Singapore, New Year's Eve is typically celebrated via public events such as fireworks shows, with the largest traditionally being held at Marina Bay (as organised by the Urban Redevelopment Authority). Major celebrations are also held in other parts of the Central Region (such as Clarke Quay and Sentosa), and various neighbourhood-level events are organised by the People's Association. State broadcaster Mediacorp organises and televises a New Year's concert event, which for 2025 was held at Singapore Sports Hub in conjunction with the launch of commemorations for Singapore's 60th anniversary of independence.

==== Taiwan ====
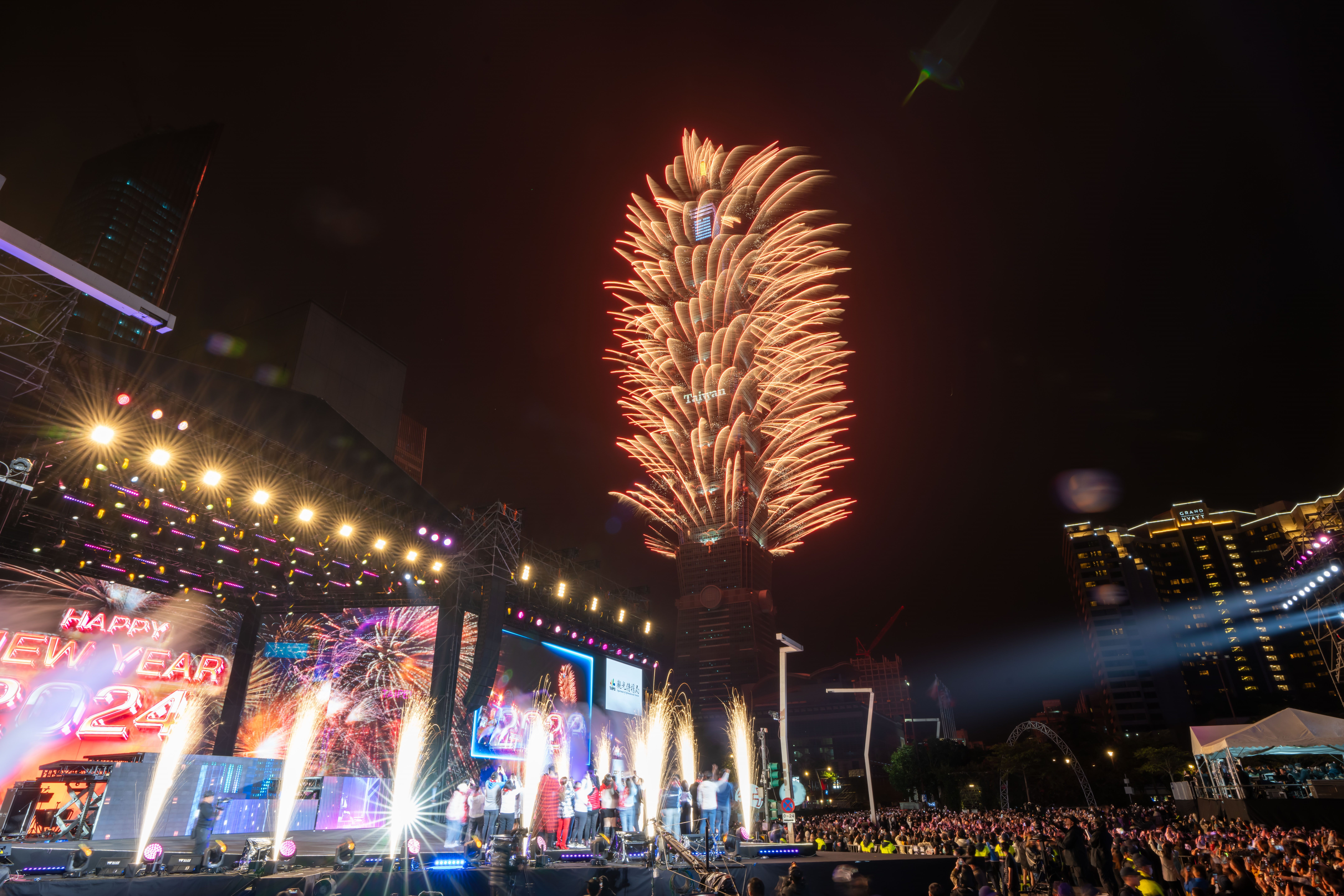
The Taipei 101 fireworks show in 2024.

The most prominent New Year's event in Taiwan is a major fireworks show launched from the Taipei 101 skyscraper in Taipei. In 2018, the show was enhanced by the installation of a new LED lighting system on the north face of the tower between its 35th and 90th floors. This change countered a reduction in the number of firework shells launched during the show, as part of an effort to produce less pollution.

A new tradition that emerged in 2023 is a flash mob gathering at Taipei's Daan Forest Park at midnight to re-enact the closing scene of Tsai Ming-liang's 1994 film Vive l'amour, in which lead character May Lin (Yang Kuei-mei) cries on a bench at the then-incomplete park. The first event was inspired by a viral social media post. On 31 December 2024, the Taiwan Film and Audiovisual Institute organized a formal version of the gathering (including a screening of the film with guest appearances by Tsai Ming-liang and the film's co-stars Yang Kuei-mei and Lee Kang-sheng) at Daan Forest Park to mark the film and park's 30th anniversary.

==== Thailand ====
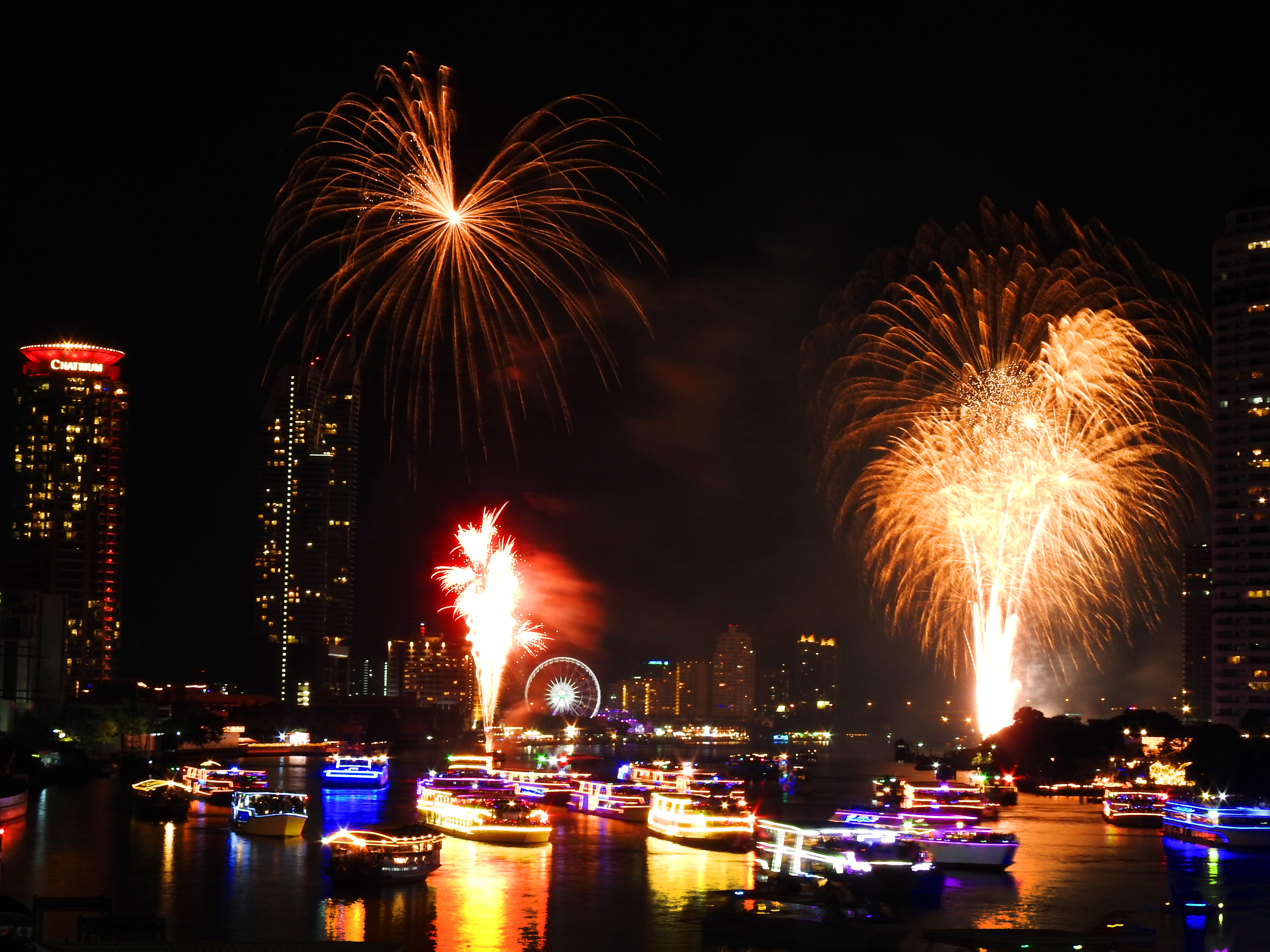
Fireworks at Chao Phraya River in Bangkok, Thailand 2019

Thailand has observed New Year's Eve on 31 December since 1940; the country adopted a localized variant of the Gregorian calendar known as the Thai solar calendar in 1888 (while maintaining the Thai lunar calendar for religious purposes), but continued to use the calculated date of the traditional Thai new year Songkran (which takes place around mid-April, and whose observance has since been fixed to 13 April) as the designated beginning of a year. In 1912, King Vajiravudh fixed the solar new year to 1 April. In 1940 under prime minister Plaek Phibunsongkhram, the new year was moved once more to 1 January for consistency with other countries; as a result of this transition, the year 2483 BE on the Thai solar calendar only lasted nine months from April through December, which led to noted disruptions of civil systems and calculations that were based on the solar calendar.

In urban and tourist areas (such as Bangkok's Chao Phraya River and the downtown CentralWorld mall, and on beaches in regions such as Pattaya and Phuket), the new year is typically celebrated through public "countdown" events with live concerts and midnight fireworks. Locations such as temples host cultural events and religious services (including prayers and meditation) that are rooted in Buddhist traditions.

==== Turkey ====
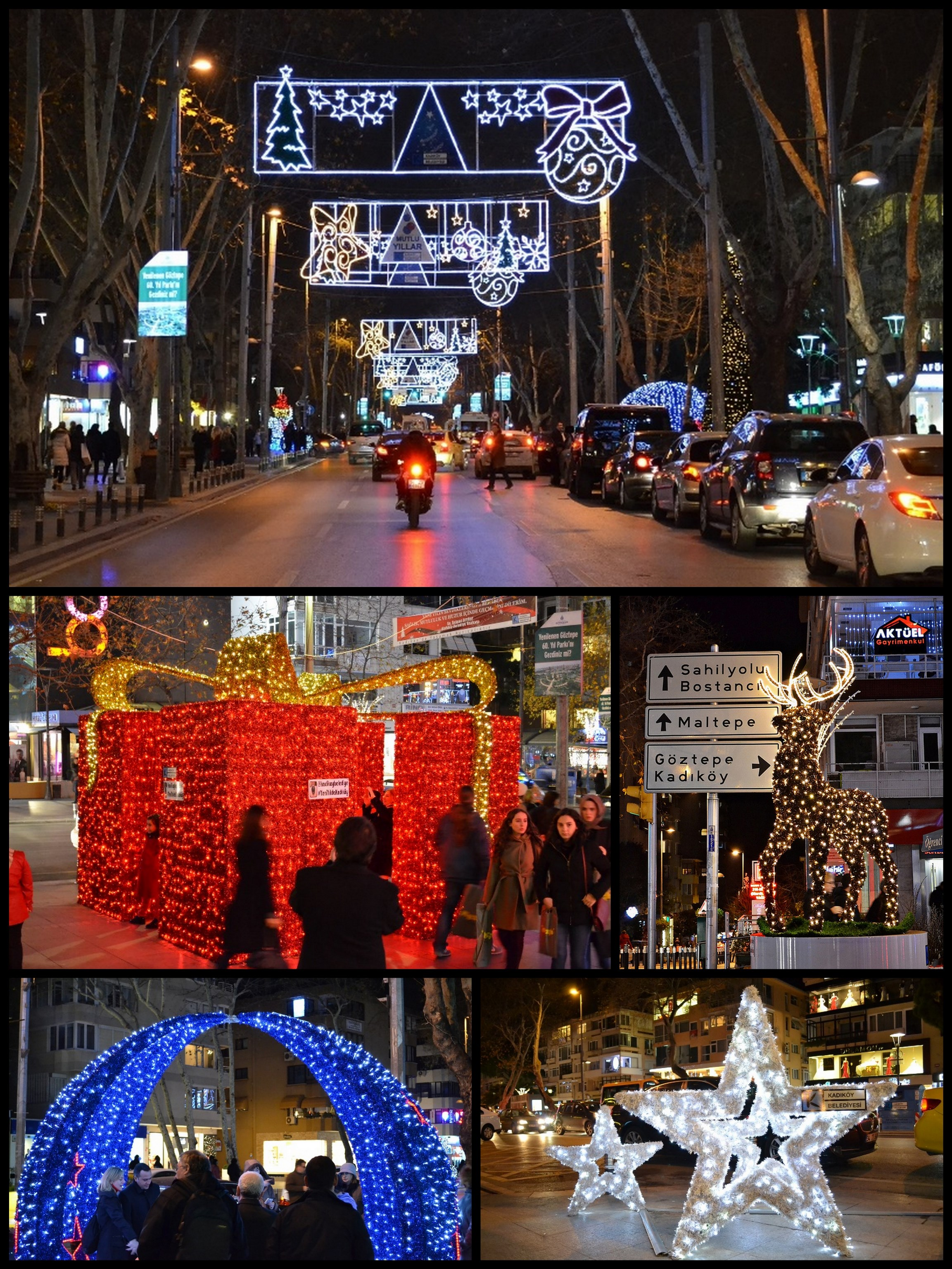
New Year's Eve decorations in Kadıköy, Istanbul.

Numerous decorations and customs traditionally associated with Christmas and Bayrams are part of secular New Year's Eve celebrations in Turkey. Homes and streets are lit in glittering lights. Small gifts are exchanged, and large family dinners are organized with family and friends, featuring a special turkey dish stuffed with a zante currant, pine nuts, pimiento and dill iç pilav, dolma, hot börek, baklava, and various other Turkish dishes; accompanied with rakı, Turkish wine, boza, şerbet, salep, Turkish tea, or coffee. Even though Turks generally do not celebrate Christmas, decorating New Year trees is an emerging tradition on New Year's Eve in Turkey and Turks associate Santa Claus with New Year's Eve.

Television and radio channels are known to continuously broadcast a variety of special New Year's Eve programs, while municipalities all around the country organize fundraising events for the poor, in addition to celebratory public shows such as concerts and family-friendly events, as well as more traditional forms of entertainment such as the Karagöz and Hacivat shadow-theater, and even performances by the Mehter—the Janissary Band that was founded during the days of the Ottoman Empire.

Public and private parties with large public attendances are organized in a number of cities and towns, particularly in the largest metropolitan areas such as Istanbul, Ankara, İzmir, Adana, Bursa and Antalya, with the biggest celebrations taking place in Istanbul's Taksim, Beyoğlu, Nişantaşı and Kadıköy districts and Ankara's Kızılay Square, which generally feature dancing, concerts, laser and light shows as well as the traditional countdown and fireworks display.

In addition, on day, the president addresses citizens in his New Year's message, congratulates them on the new year and talks about his goals for the new year.

==== United Arab Emirates ====
In Dubai, United Arab Emirates, the Burj Khalifa—the world's tallest building—has hosted an annual fireworks display, which is among the world's most expensive. For 2017–18, a multimedia light and sound show was presented using the tower's lighting system in lieu of fireworks, which set a Guinness World Record for the largest light and sound show staged on a single building. The fireworks show returned for 2018–19, in tandem with a multimedia presentation.

=== Europe ===
==== Albania ====
Preparations for New Year's Eve in Albania start with the Christmas tree, which in Albania is known as "New Year's Tree" or "New Year's Pine". At midnight, Albanians toast and greet each other and fireworks are lit.

==== Austria ====
In Austria, New Year's Eve is usually celebrated with friends and family. At exactly midnight, all radio and television programmes operated by ORF broadcast the sound of the Pummerin, the bell of St. Stephen's Cathedral in Vienna, followed by the Donauwalzer ("The Blue Danube") by Johann Strauss II. Many Austrians dance to this at parties or in the street. Large crowds gather in the streets of Vienna, where the municipal government organizes a series of stages where bands and orchestras play. Fireworks are set off by both municipal governments and individuals.

==== Belgium ====
In Belgium, New Year's Eve (Dutch: Sint Sylvester Vooravond ["Saint Sylvester's Eve"] or Oudjaar ["old year"]) is celebrated with family parties – called réveillons [let's wake up] in the French speaking areas. On television, a stand-up comedian reviews the past year after which a musical or variety show signals midnight, when Belgians kiss, exchange good luck greetings, and toast the New Year and absent relatives and friends with champagne. Many Belgians light fireworks or go into the street to watch them. Most cities have their own fireworks display: the most famous is at Mont des Arts in Brussels. Cities, cafés and restaurants are crowded. Free bus services and special New Year's Eve taxis (the Responsible Young Drivers) bring Belgians home afterwards.

On 1 January (Dutch: Nieuwjaarsdag) children read their "New Year's letter" and give holiday greeting cards of decorated paper featuring golden cherubs and angels, colored roses and ribbon-tied garlands to parents and godparents, on decorated paper.

==== Bosnia and Herzegovina ====
New Year is widely celebrated in Bosnia and Herzegovina. Streets are decorated for New Year's Eve and there is a fireworks show and concerts in all of the larger cities. Restaurants, clubs, cafes and hotels are usually full of guests and they organize New Year's Eve parties.

In the capital Sarajevo, Bosnians gather in the Square of children of Sarajevo where a local rock band entertains them. Several trumpet and rock groups play until the early morning hours. At midnight there is a big fireworks show.

==== Czechia and Slovakia ====
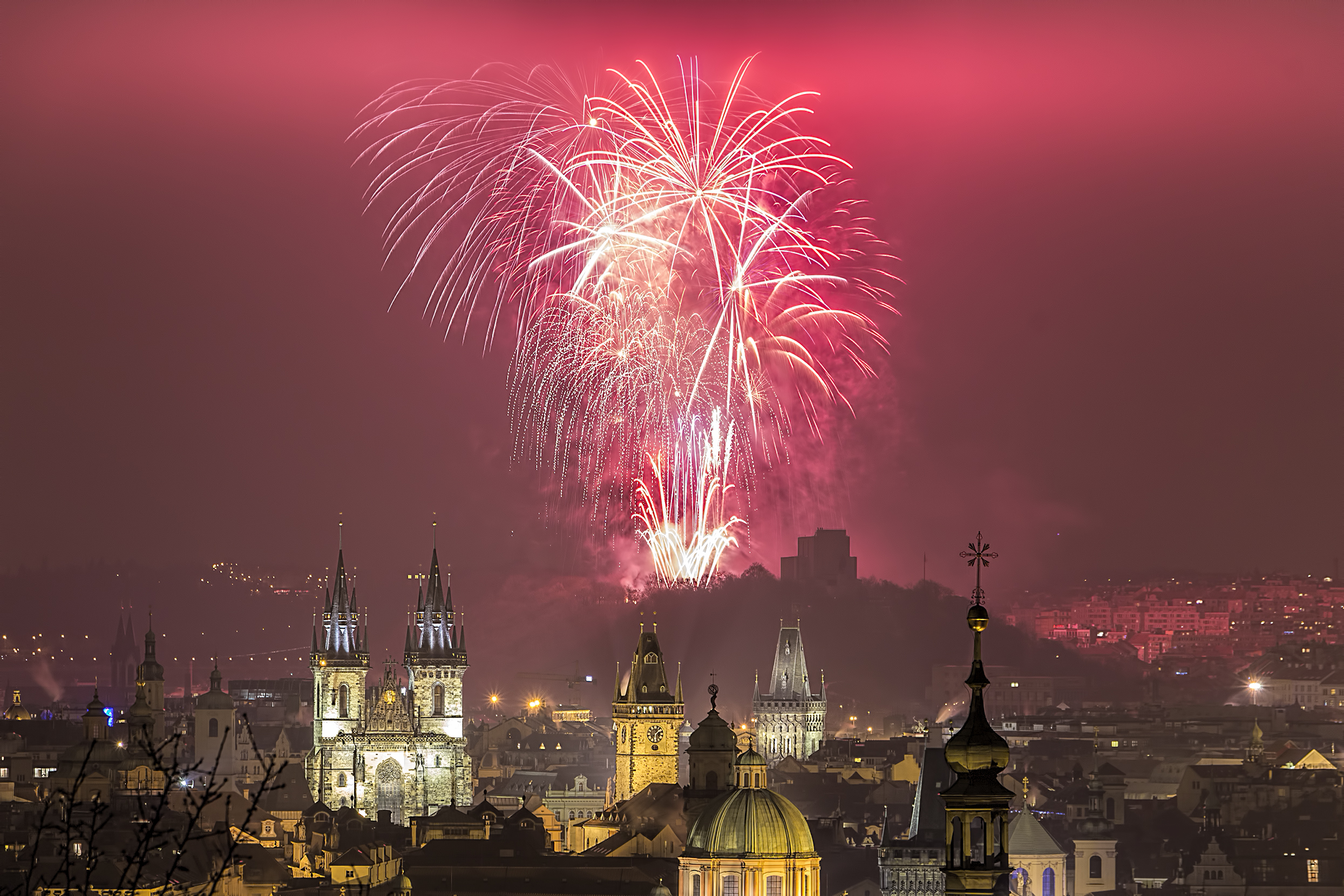
Prague New Year Fireworks

New Year's Eve (Silvestr/Silvester) celebrations and traditions in Czech Republic and Slovakia are very similar. New Year's Eve is the noisiest day of the year. Czechs and Slovaks generally gather with friends at parties, in pubs, clubs, in the streets, or city squares to eat, drink, and celebrate the new year. Fireworks are a popular tradition; in large cities such as Bratislava, or Prague, the fireworks start before noon and steadily increase until the clock strikes midnight. In the first minutes after midnight, Czechs and Slovaks toast with champagne, wish each other a happy new year, fortune and health, and go outside for the fireworks displays.

In both countries all major TV stations air entertainment shows before and after the midnight countdown, which is followed by the National anthem of each country. The Presidents of the republics gave their New Year speech in the morning – ex-Czech President Miloš Zeman renewed the tradition of Christmas speeches. In recent years however the Czechoslovak national anthem is played at midnight in some stations, in honor of the shared history of both nations.

On this day, Czechs and Slovaks traditionally make a sandwich-like food, the chlebíčky. The recipe is a bread, ham, cheese, egg and tomato.

The greeting is "Šťastný Nový rok!", but in Christany, they say "Všechno nejlepší do novího roku!" / "Všetko dobré do nového roku!" (All the best/goodness to the New Year!) followed by luck, health etc., similar to birthday wishes, but instead of saying "Thank you" they say "You too", because it is a holiday for everybody.

==== Denmark ====
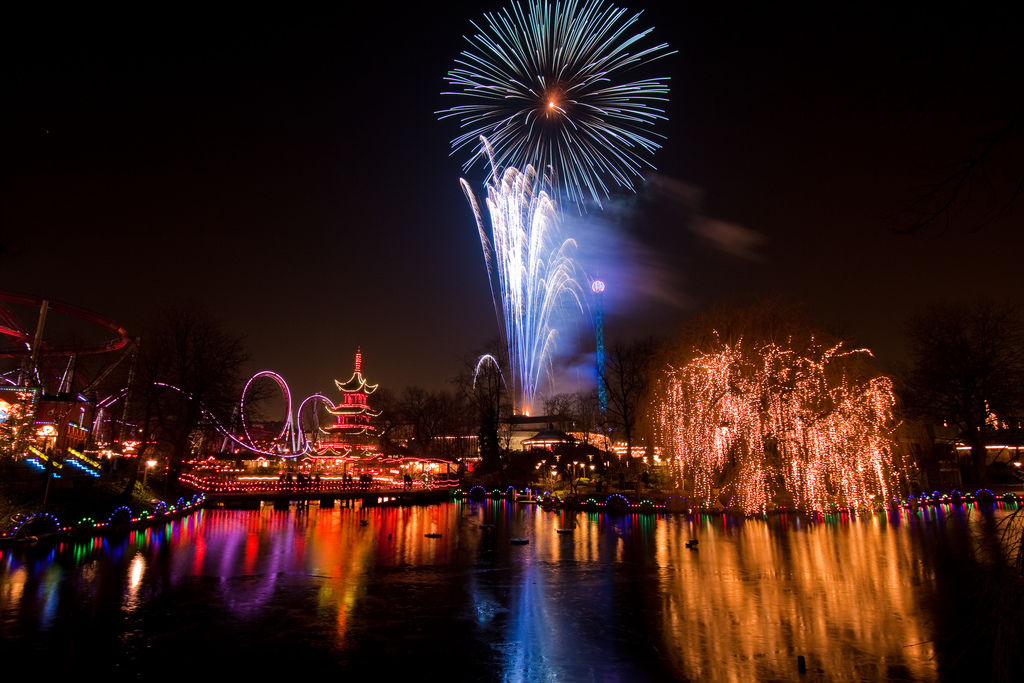
New Year fireworks over Copenhagen

Danes in Denmark may go to parties or entertain guests at home. There is a special evening meal that concludes with Kransekage, a special dessert, along with champagne. Other traditional dishes are boiled cod, stewed kale and cured saddle of pork. However, expensive cuts of beef as well as sushi have become increasingly popular. Another well-known tradition is jumping off a chair at midnight, symbolizing a leap into the new year.

Multiple significant traditional events are broadcast on television and radio on 31 December. This includes, but is not limited to:

The monarch's New Year message from Amalienborg Palace at 18:00 and the Town Hall Clock in Copenhagen striking midnight. Thousands of Danes gather together in Rådhuspladsen (the Town Hall Square) and cheer.

The Royal Guard parade in their red gala uniforms. The climax of the celebration is fireworks launched as the Town Hall Tower bells chime on the stroke of midnight. After midnight, all radio & television stations play: "Vær velkommen, Herrens år" [Danish new year's hymn] and followed by "Kong Christian stod ved højen mast" [Danish Royal Anthem] and "Der er et yndigt land" [Danish National Anthem].

Like in the surrounding nations, the German comedy sketch Dinner for One is broadcast every year at 23:45, and ends just minutes before the new year. This has been a tradition every year since 1980 (except in 1985).

Another reoccurring broadcast is the 1968 film The Party, which is aired after midnight on 1 January.

==== Estonia ====
To celebrate New Year's Eve in Estonia, Estonians decorate villages, visit friends and prepare lavish meals.

Some believe that Estonians should eat seven, nine, or twelve times on New Year's Eve. These are lucky numbers in Estonia; it is believed that for each meal consumed, the person gains the strength of that many men the following year. Meals should not be completely finished—some food should be left for ancestors and spirits who visit the house on New Year's Eve.

Traditional New Year food includes pork with sauerkraut or Estonian sauerkraut (mulgikapsad), baked potatoes and swedes with hog's head, and white and blood sausage. Vegetarians can eat potato salad with navy beet and pâté. Gingerbread and marzipan are very popular for dessert. Traditional New Year drinks include beer and mead, but mulled wine and champagne have become modern favourites.

==== Finland ====
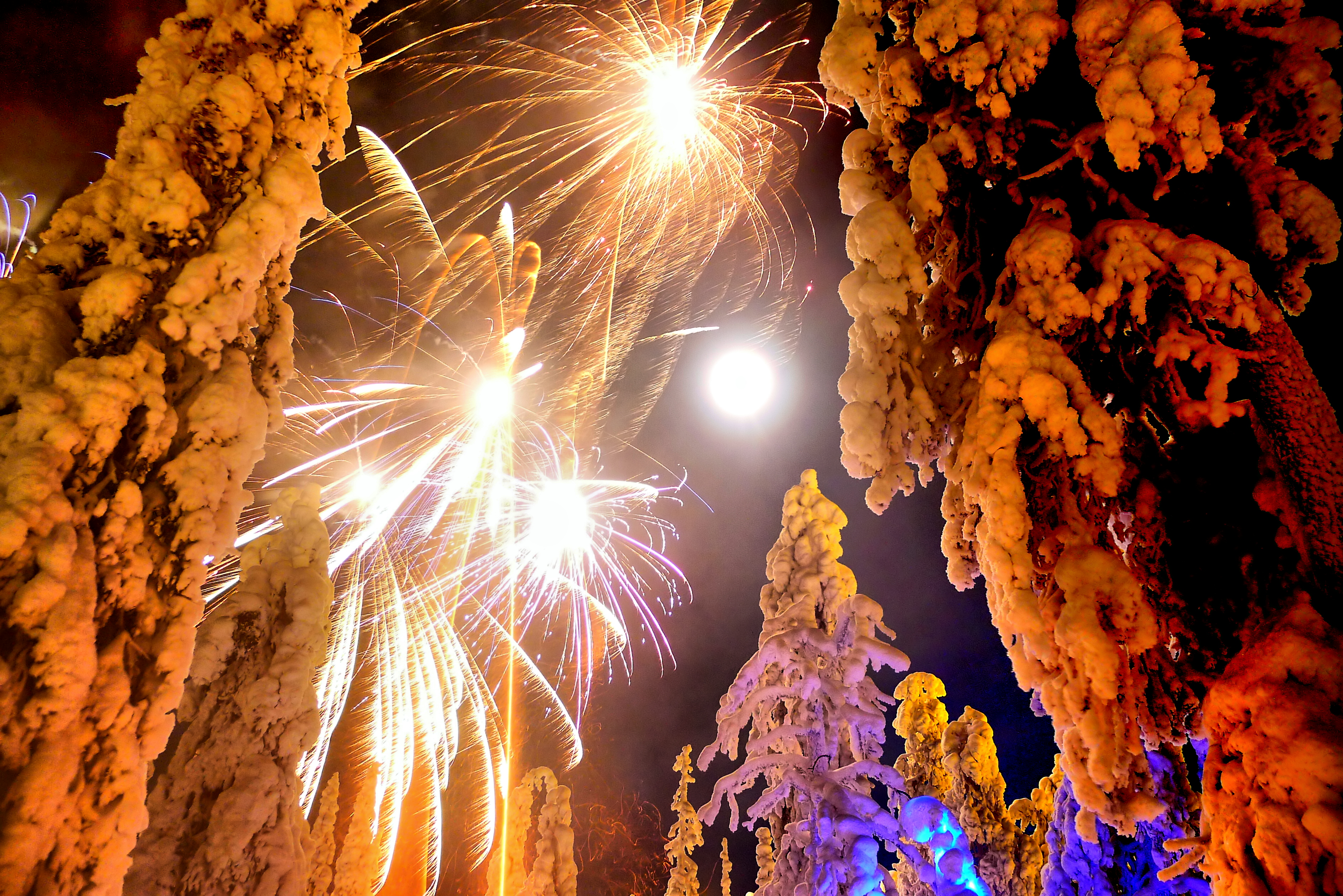
Fireworks in the forest of Ruka on New Year's Eve in Kuusamo, Finland

In Finland, New Year's Eve is usually celebrated with family or friends. Late supper is served, often featuring wieners, Janssons frestelse, and potato salad. Some municipalities organize fireworks at midnight. Consumer fireworks are also very popular. A Finnish tradition is molybdomancy – to tell the fortunes of the New Year by melting "tin" (actually lead) in a tiny pan on the stove and throwing it quickly in a bucket of cold water. The resulting blob of metal is analyzed, for example by interpreting shadows it casts by candlelight. These predictions are however never taken seriously.

The principal broadcast is aired by YLE at Helsinki Senate Square featuring Finnish music stars. The countdown to the New Year is with the Helsinki Cathedral clock. Preceding this the German comedy sketch Dinner for One is shown every year in the afternoon. On the radio, just before midnight, the poem Hymyilevä Apollo (Smiling Apollo) by Eino Leino is read.

==== France ====
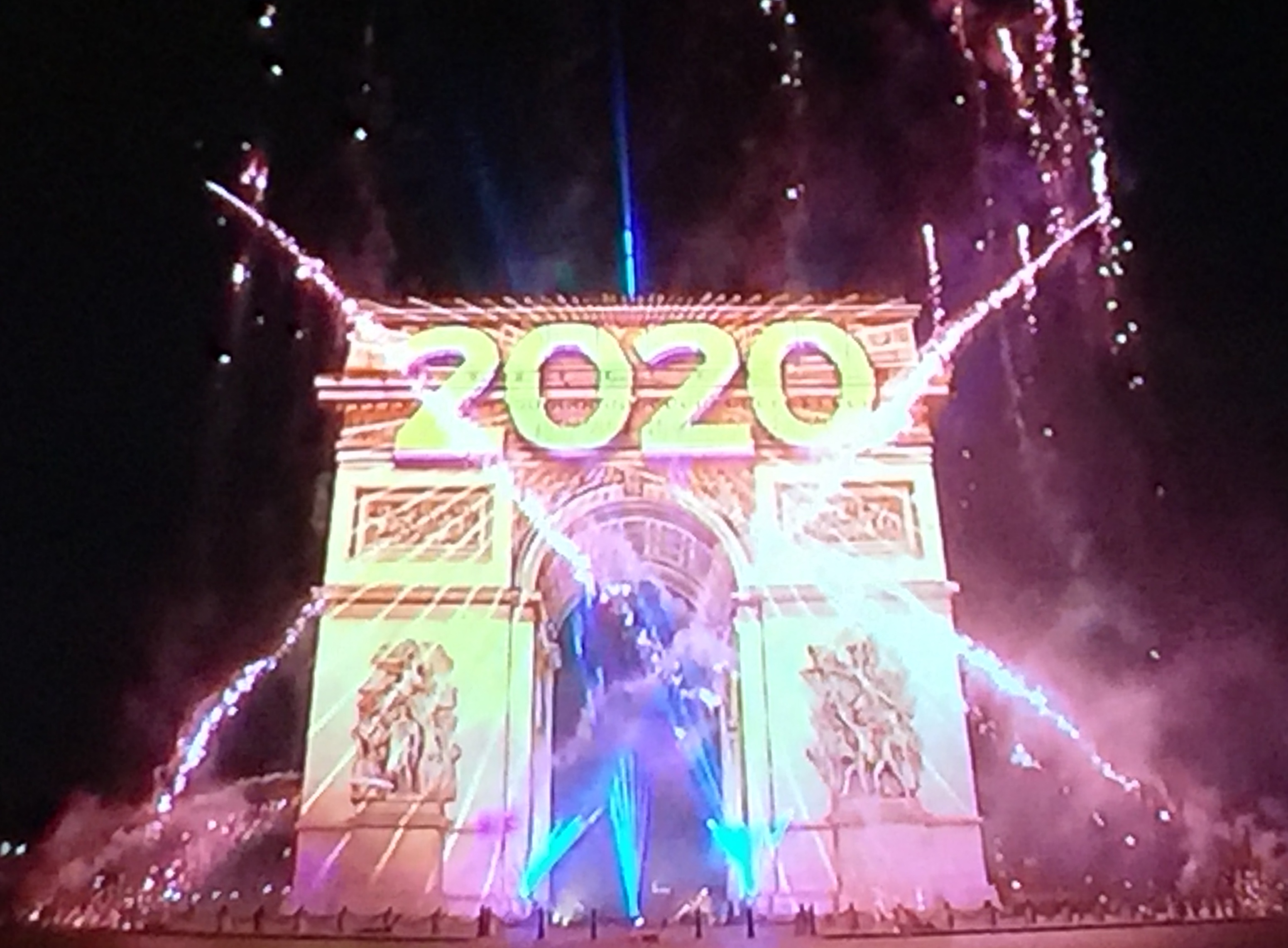
Fireworks at Arc de Triomphe in Paris to welcome 2020.

In France, New Year's Eve (la Saint-Sylvestre) is usually celebrated with a feast, le Réveillon de la Saint-Sylvestre (Cap d'Any in Northern Catalonia). This feast customarily includes special dishes including foie gras, seafood such as oysters, and champagne. The celebration can be a simple, intimate dinner with friends and family or, une soirée dansante, a much fancier ball.

On New Year's Day (le Jour de l'An) friends and family exchange New Year's resolutions, kisses, and wishes. Some people eat ice cream.

Paris and Marseille host the main festivities of the day. A sound and light show using video mapping techniques has been held on the Arc de Triomphe since 2014 (except in 2021 and 2022 due to the COVID-19 pandemic), ending with a fireworks display at midnight. It is broadcast live on major television networks like France 2.

==== Germany ====
In Germany, parties are common on New Year's Eve (Silvester), and wishes of luck may be worded as "Guten Rutsch ins neue Jahr!", which literally translates into "Good slide into the new year!" or "Slide well into the new year!", as well as "Prost Neujahr!" for "Cheers (to the) New Year!" or "Frohes Neues!" literally meaning "Happy new one!" Fireworks are very popular, both with individuals and at large municipal displays. 31 December and the three days leading up to it are the only four days of the year on which fireworks (of class F2) may be sold to private citizens without a fireworks license in Germany. Every year Berlin hosts one of the largest New Year's Eve celebrations in all of Europe, attended by over a million Germans. The focal point is the Brandenburg Gate, where midnight fireworks are centered, with a live broadcast on ZDF under the name Willkommen with musical guests beginning in 2011. Germans toast the New Year with a glass of Sekt (German sparkling wine) or champagne. Molybdomancy (Bleigießen) is another German New Year's Eve tradition, which involves telling fortunes by the shapes made by molten lead dropped into cold water. Other auspicious actions are to touch a chimney sweep or rub some ash on one's forehead for good luck and health. Jam-filled doughnuts with or without alcoholic fillings are eaten. Finally a tiny marzipan pig is consumed for more good luck. In some northern regions of Germany (e.g. East Frisia) the making of Speckendicken (also Speckdicken) is another tradition – Germans go door to door visiting their neighbors and partaking in this dish. It looks similar to a pancake, but the recipe calls for either dark molasses or dark syrup, topped with a few mettwurst slices and bacon strips.

Another notable tradition is watching the British comedy sketch Dinner for One, which has traditionally been broadcast on German television on New Year's Eve since 1972. The version traditionally broadcast on German television was originally recorded in 1963, and was occasionally used as filler programming by NDR due to popular demand; in 1972, Dinner for One received its traditional New Year's Eve scheduling. The sketch, as well as its catchphrase "the same procedure as every year", are well known in German pop culture. Dinner for One is also broadcast on or around New Year's Eve in other European countries, although it is, ironically, relatively unknown in the United Kingdom.

==== Greece ====
A midnight fireworks display is held over the historic Parthenon temple in the capital of Athens.

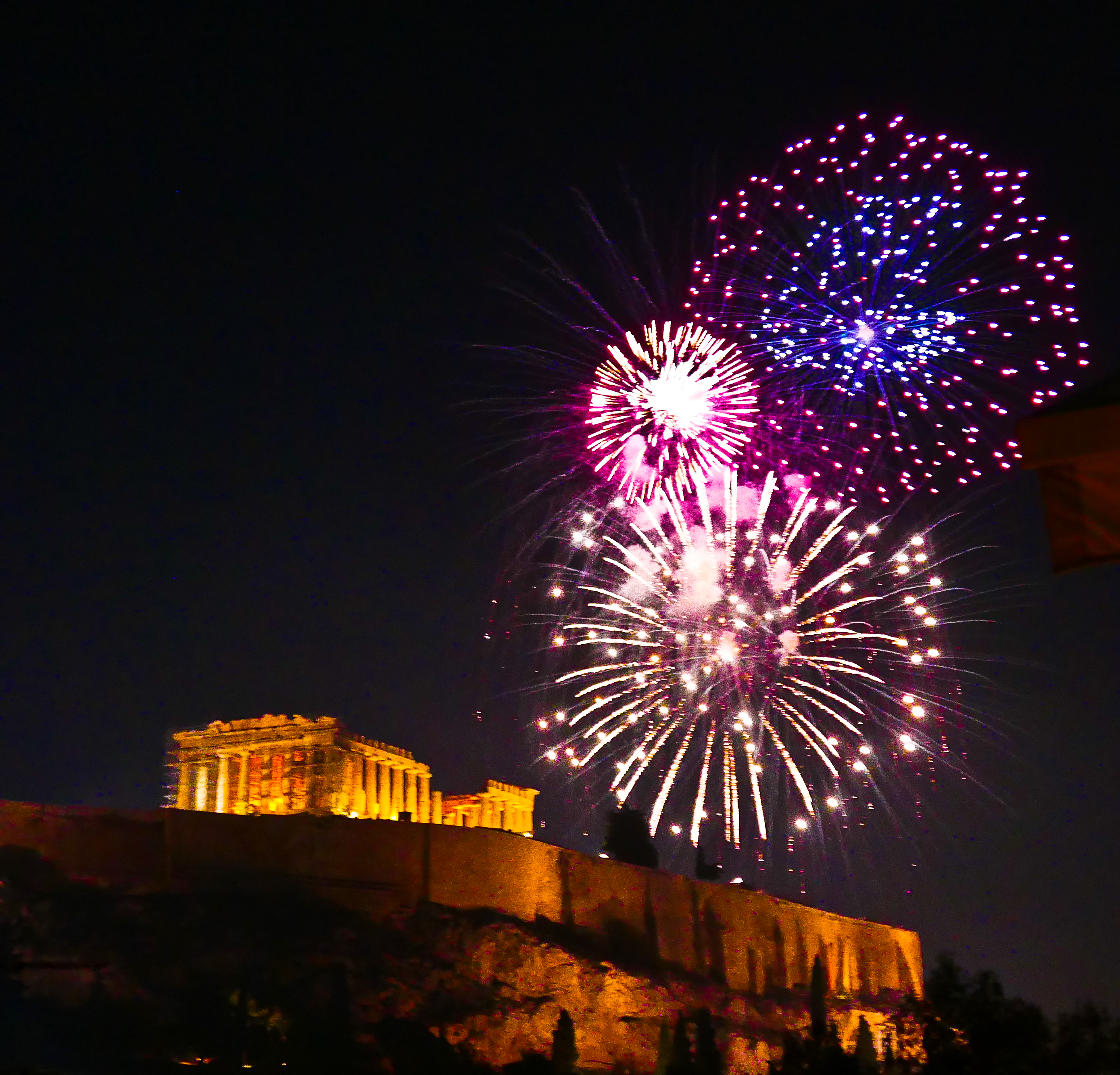
Fireworks at Parthenon in Athens entering 2018.

A common tradition among Greek Orthodox families is the cutting of a vasilopita ("King's pie" or "St. Basil's pie") at midnight. A coin or similar object is usually baked inside, and whoever finds it is said to have luck over the next year. New Year's Day is considered a feast day for Basil of Caesarea, and it is also considered a custom to reserve the first slice of the vasilopita for St. Basil.

==== Hungary ====
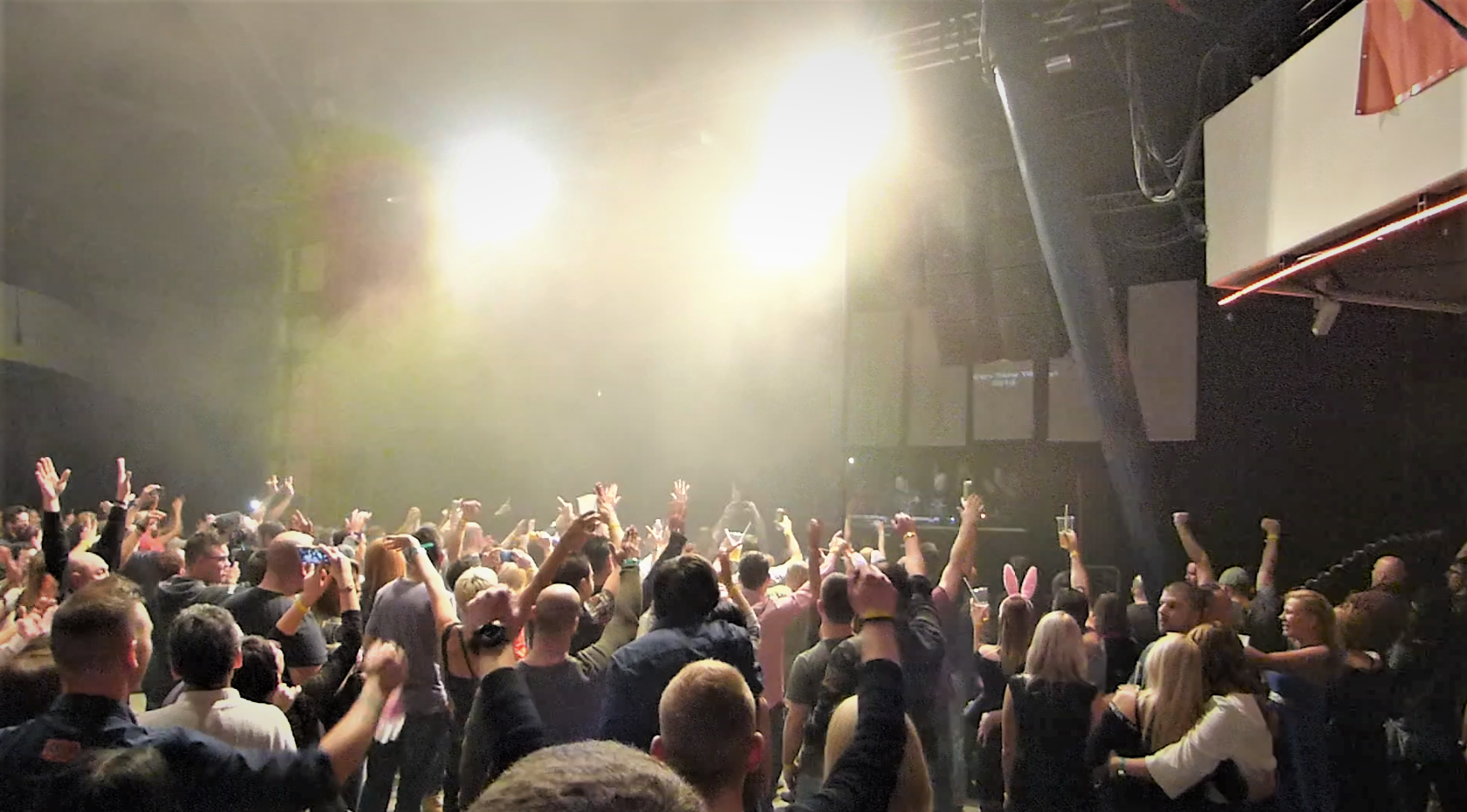
Midnight – Millenáris, NYE 2017

New Year's Eve (Szilveszter) in Hungary is celebrated with home parties and street parties, including a gathering in downtown Budapest. Fireworks and firecrackers are popular. Champagne, wine and traditional Hungarian New Year dishes—frankfurter sausages with horseradish, lentil soup, fish, and roast pig—are consumed. The national anthem is commonly sung at midnight.

Television channels usually broadcast comedic and musical programs most of the day and in the evening. At midnight, a countdown is followed by the national anthem and the President's speech (which is usually pre-recorded).

A common greeting is "BUÉK!", a common slang expression to 'wish a Happy New Year' (or Boldog Új évet).

In past centuries, some Hungarians believed that animals were able to speak on New Year's Eve, and that onion skins sprinkled with salt could indicate a rainy month.

Hungarian Christian communities focus on celebrating Mass on both New Year's Eve and New Year's Day. The Kiskarácsony traditions are also connected to the time (a holiday which has been present since the Middle Ages or longer)

==== Iceland ====
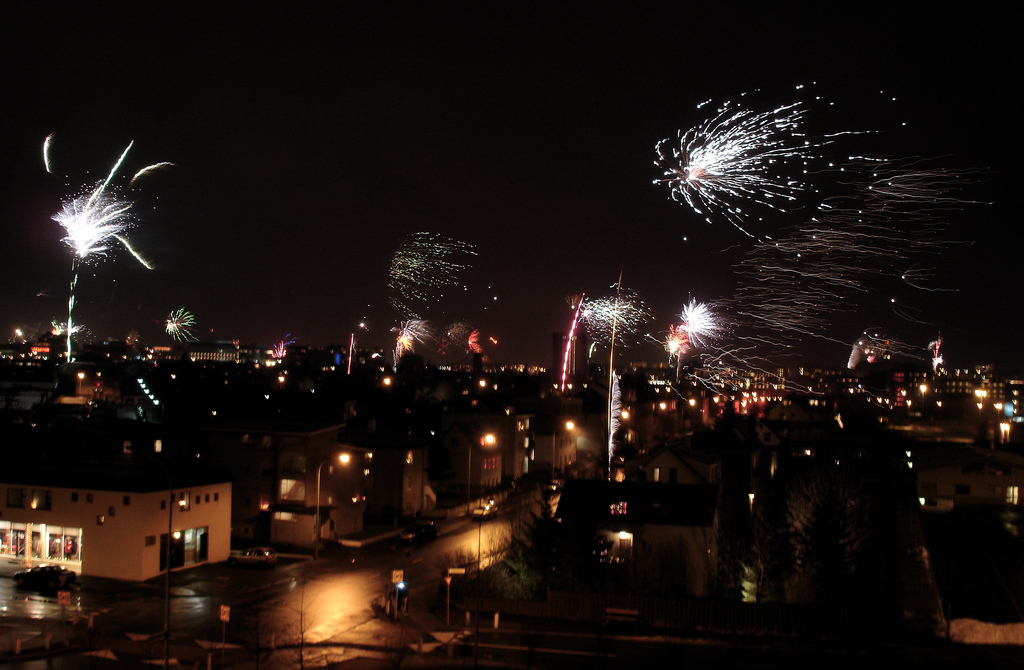
New Year fireworks over Reykjavík, Iceland

Fireworks are very popular in Iceland, particularly on New Year's Eve. Iceland's biggest New Year's Eve events are usually in and around the capital, Reykjavík.

Since the 1940s, the country's public broadcaster RÚV has traditionally broadcast Áramótaskaupið (lit. The New Year's Comedy or The New Year's Lampoon), a sketch comedy special satirizing events and news headlines from the past year. Originating from radio and later moving to television, the special is the most-watched television program of the year in Iceland (with an estimated 75% of the population having watched the special in 2018, across 98% of all televisions in the country). Some of its sketches have become well known in local popular culture, such as a 1989 sketch that portrayed then Minister of Finance Ólafur Ragnar Grímsson as a Batman-esque superhero known as "Skattmann" ("Taxman"), and a 2008 sketch which popularized the catchphrase "Helvítis fokking fokk!" as a reaction to the Icelandic financial crisis.

==== Ireland ====
New Year's Eve (Oíche Chinn Bliana, Oíche na Coda Móire or Oíche Chaille, the night of big portion) when traditionally households would partake in a large feast that was believed to ensure a plentiful new year. Beliefs around the day meant that no food or other goods would be taken from the house, to guard against lack or hunger in the year to come, believing that if anything was taken from the house on this day the house would remain empty for the year and have no luck. It was traditional for no water to be drawn from a well after sunset. Even the homeless and those in need would not be offered food or alms on this day. In some parts of the country, a large barmbrack would be baked during the day, with the man of the house taking three large bites of the cake in the evening, and throwing it against the inside of the front door as an offering to the Holy Trinity. An invocation accompanied this:

Fógraímíd an gorta
Amach go tír na dTurcach;
Ó 'nocht go bliain ó 'nocht
Agus 'nocht féin amach

This translates as "We warn famine to retire, To the land of the Turks; From tonight to this night twelve months, And from this night itself." The bits of cake would be gathered, and eaten by the family. Other variations include throwing the cake to someone outside the door, or conducting the ritual in the stables or other animal housing. Church bells ringing, the lighting of bonfires, and singing would take place towards midnight.

In modern times, celebrations in major cities are modest, with most Irish citizens favoring small parties in the home for family and friends.

==== Italy ====
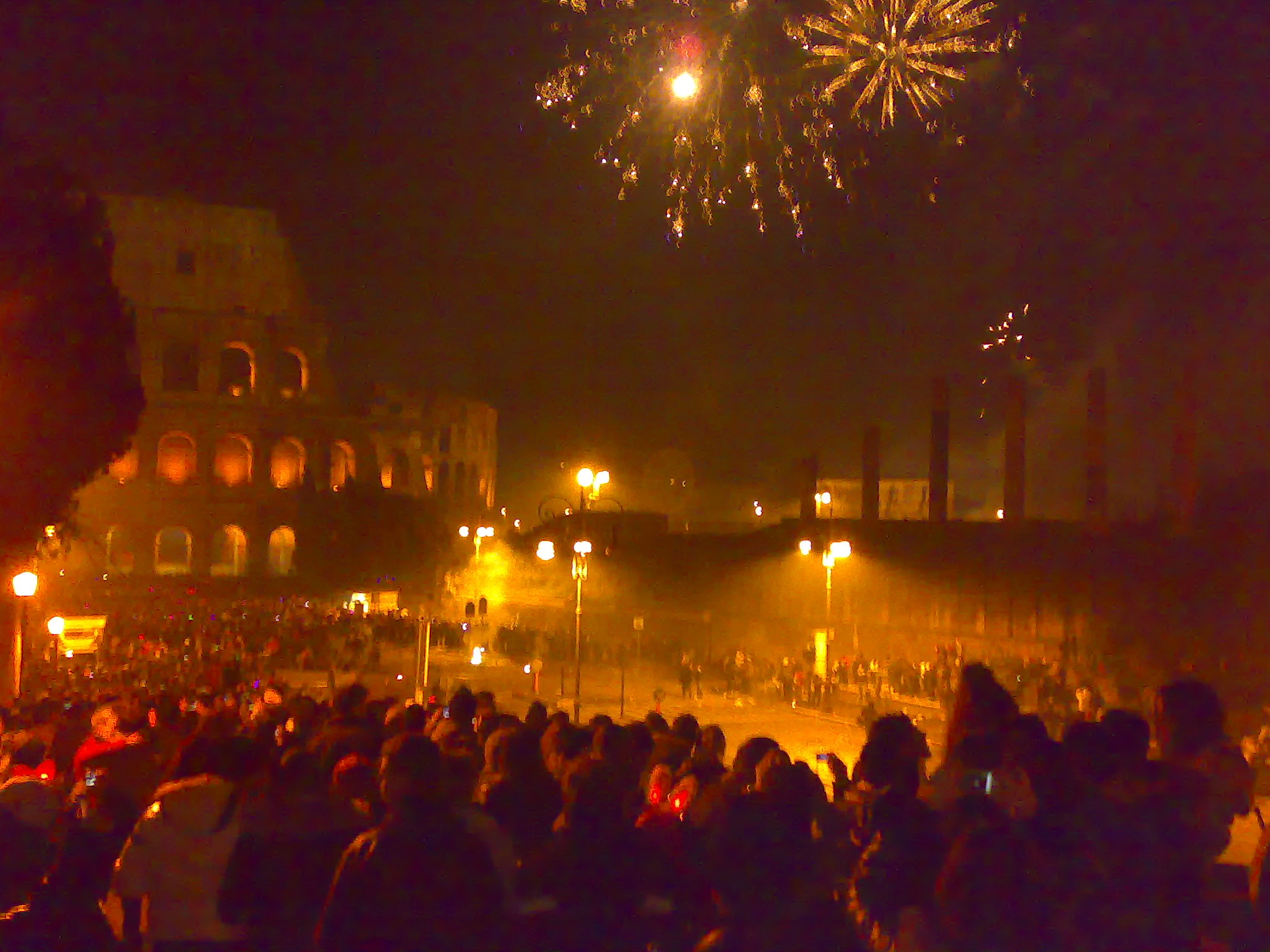
Fireworks going off at the stroke of midnight at the Colosseum in Rome to welcome 2012

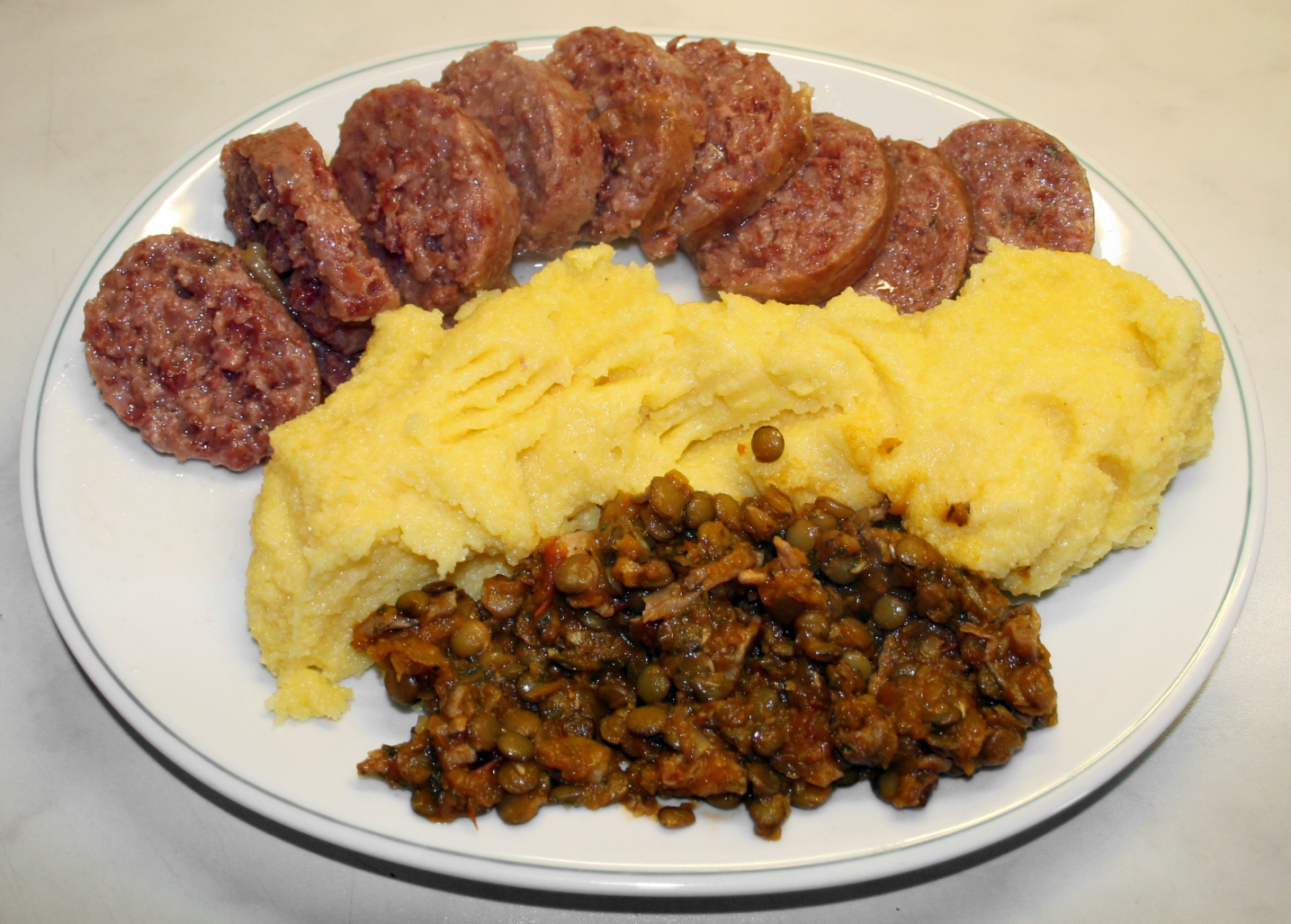
Traditional cotechino, polenta and lentils

In Italy, New Year's Eve (Italian: Vigilia di Capodanno or Notte di San Silvestro) is celebrated by the observation of traditional rituals, such as wearing red underwear. An ancient tradition in southern regions which is rarely followed today was disposing of old or unused items by dropping them from the window.

Dinner is traditionally eaten with relatives and friends. It often includes zampone or cotechino (a meal made with pig's trotters or entrails), lentils, and (in Northern Italy) polenta. At 20:30, the President of Italy's address to the nation, produced by RAI, the state broadcaster, is broadcast countrywide on radio and TV networks.

Rarely followed today is the tradition that consist in eating lentil stew when the bell tolls midnight, one spoonful per bell. This is supposed to bring good fortune; the round lentils represent coins.

Usually the evening is spent with family or friends in a square (where concerts or various parties are organised and broadcast on various television networks including Rai 1 (L’anno Che Verrà) and Canale 5 (Capodanno in Musica)) but also at home. Generally, starting from ten seconds before midnight, it is customary to count down until reaching zero, thus wishing a happy new year, toasting with spumante and watching or lighting fireworks, shooting firecrackers or guns loaded with blanks.

==== Malta ====
Malta organized its first New Year's street party in 2009 in Floriana. The event was not highly advertised and proved controversial, due to the closing of an arterial street for the day. In 2010 there were the first national celebrations in St. George's Square, Valletta Although professional fireworks are very popular in Malta, they are almost totally absent on New Year's Eve. Maltese usually hit nightclubs and specific dance music parties to celebrate New Year's Eve.

==== Montenegro ====
In Montenegro, New Year's Eve celebrations are held in all large cities, usually accompanied by fireworks. It is usually celebrated with family or friends, at home or outside. Restaurants, clubs, cafés and hotels organize celebrations with food and music.

==== Netherlands ====
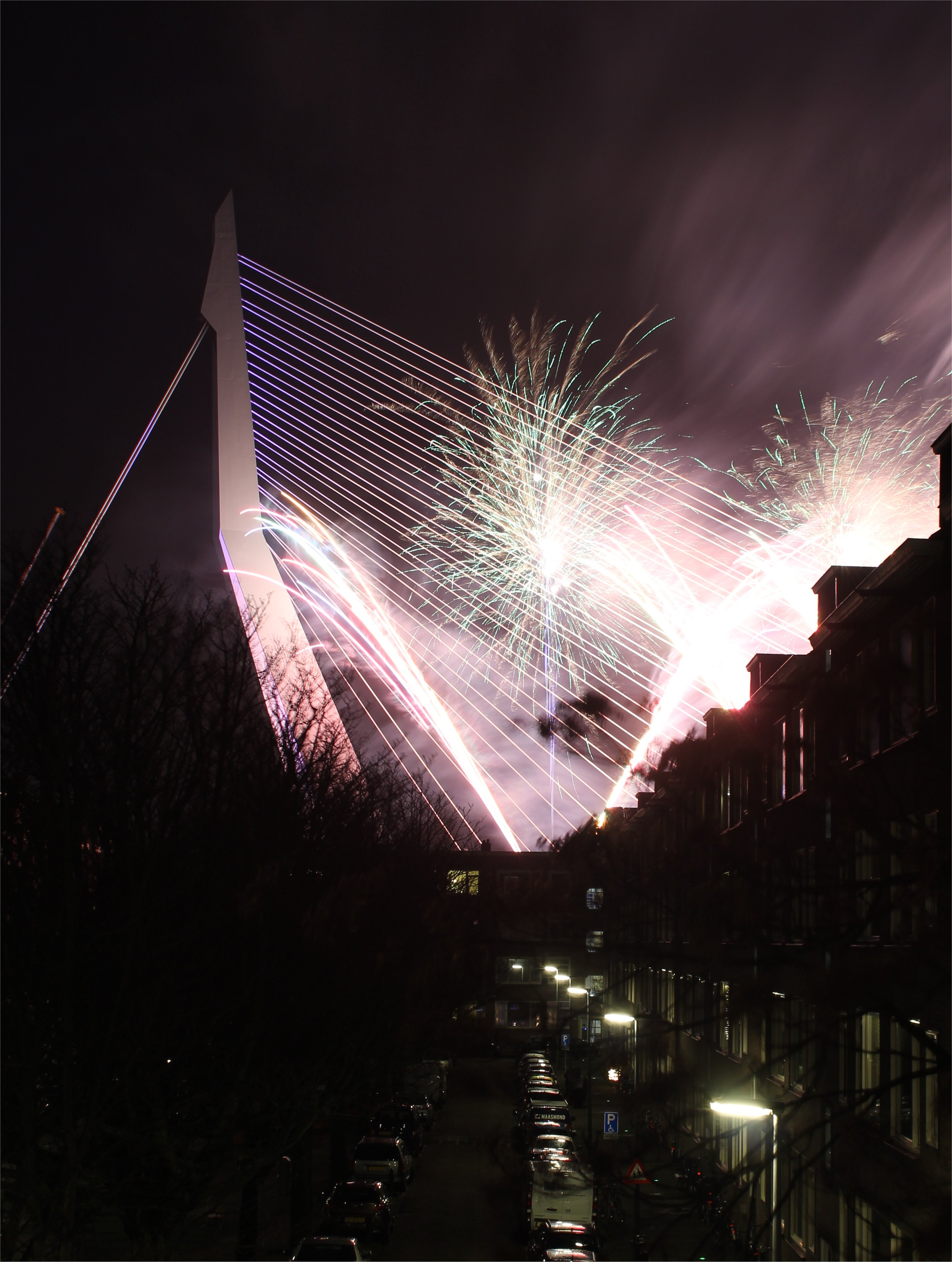
The New Year's fireworks at the Erasmusbrug in Rotterdam.

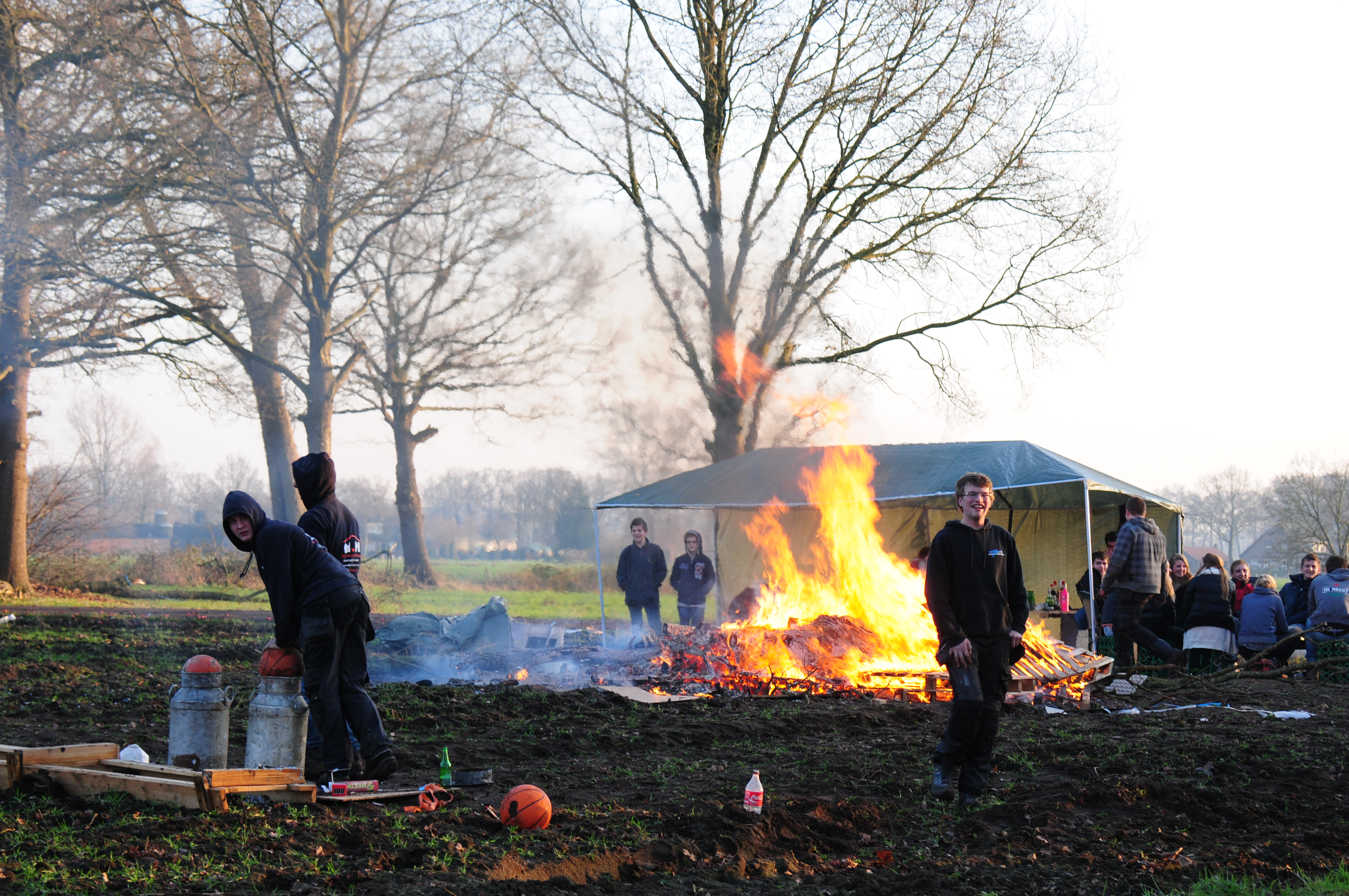
A group of people holding a bonfire and carbidschieten.

New Year's Eve (Oud en Nieuw or Oudejaarsavond) in the Netherlands is usually celebrated as a cozy evening with family or friends, although big organized parties can also be attended. Traditional snack foods are oliebollen (Dutch doughnuts) and appelbeignets (apple slice fritters). A past tradition among Reformed Protestant families was the reading of Psalm 90 shortly before midnight.

A common New Year's television special is the oudejaarsconference (new year's conference), a satirical comedy cabaret discussing the events of the past year; comedians Wim Kan (who is credited with having established the concept in 1954) and Seth Gaaikema were considered synonymous with the oudejaarsconference during their careers. Since 1999, originally to mark the new millennium, NPO Radio 2 has broadcast an annual countdown of the top 2000 songs of all time as determined by a survey of its listeners. The Top 2000 usually begins on Christmas Day, and airs non-stop through New Year's Eve from a temporary studio at the Netherlands Institute for Sound and Vision in Hilversum.

Professional fireworks displays are held in major cities such as Rotterdam (which is the largest display in the country) and Amsterdam. Until 2026, New Year's Eve was the only time of year where category F2 and F3 fireworks could be legally purchased for private use by the general public without training and/or certification; these fireworks could only be sold during the last three days of the year (excluding any Sundays), and could only be lit between 6 p.m. on 31 December and 2 a.m. on 1 January. A popular alternative or compliment to fireworks in rural areas is carbidschieten (carbide shooting), in which calcium carbide explosions are used to shoot the lid (or, alternatively, a ball) off the top of a milk churn. In 2014, carbidschieten was named a part of the Netherlands' intangible cultural heritage.

Due to injuries and deaths caused by fireworks use, there were numerous calls to ban the public sale of fireworks for New Year's Eve. By 2024, 19 municipalities had banned fireworks outside of professional shows, and around 100 had prohibitions on the use of fireworks in proximity to areas such as parks and hospitals. However, these policies proved ineffective due to the wide use of illegal fireworks. In July 2025, the Dutch cabinet passed legislation banning the sale of pyrotechnics classified as category F2 or higher to the general public; the legislation took effect in August 2026. The law does include some exemptions for events organised by small associations within safety requirements, but the majority of municipalities have stated that they will not honour requests for these permits.

==== Macedonia ====
New Year's Eve is celebrated across North Macedonia. New Year's Day is celebrated by day-long fireworks shows. The day is celebrated together with family or friends at home or in restaurants, clubs, cafés and hotels. During the daytime celebration, children get gifts. Evening celebrations include food, music, and dancing to both traditional Macedonian folk music, and modern music. New Year's Eve is celebrated on 31 December and also on 14 January according to the Macedonian Orthodox Calendar.

==== Norway ====
In Norway, New Year's Eve (Nyttårsaften) is the second biggest celebration of the year, after Christmas Eve. While Christmas Eve is a family celebration, New Year's Eve is an opportunity to celebrate with friends.

Traditionally, there is first a feast, commonly consisting of stuffed, roast turkey with potatoes, sprouts, gravy and Waldorf salad. The accompanying beverage is traditionally beer (commonly either Christmas beer or lager beer). Dessert will often be vanilla pudding or rice cream, and there will be cakes and coffee later in the evening – commonly accompanied by a glass of cognac. Then, at close to midnight on New Year's Day, Norwegians will go outside to send up fireworks. Fireworks are only permitted to be sold to the general public on the days leading up to New Year's Eve, and only to be launched that night.

Due to the general use of fireworks, more fires occur on New Year's Eve than on any other day of the year in Norway. Accordingly, most Norwegian cities, and many towns, host a large, public fireworks display in order to discourage private use of fireworks in built-up areas. Norwegians will then congregate in a central square or similar to watch and celebrate.

==== Poland ====
In Poland, New Year's Eve (Sylwester) celebrations include both indoor and outdoor festivities. A large open-air concert is held in the Main Square in Kraków. 150,000 to 200,000 revelers celebrate the New Year with live music and a fireworks display over St. Mary's Basilica. Similar festivities are held in other cities around Poland.

For those who do not wish to spend the New Year in the city, the mountains are a popular destination. Zakopane, located in the Carpathian Mountains, is the most popular Polish mountain resort in winter.

Also, New Year's Eve (Sylwester) celebrations are in Katowice, near the Spodek arena. In Sławatycze, Polish Citizens tour the streets dressed up as bearded men.

Major television networks broadcast the events live all across the country on New Year's Eve like Polsat and TVP.

==== Portugal ====
Fireworks in Funchal, Madeira Islands

In Portugal, the New Year celebration is taken very seriously. The tradition is to drink champagne and eat twelve raisins – one for each month of the year, making a wish for each. Another Portuguese tradition is a special cake called Bolo-Rei (literally: King Cake). Bolo-Rei is a round cake with a large hole in the centre, resembling a crown covered with crystallized and dried fruit. It is baked from a soft, white dough, with raisins, various nuts and crystallized fruit. Inside is hidden the characteristic fava (broad bean). Tradition dictates that whoever finds the fava has to pay for the Bolo-Rei next year. Initially, a small prize (usually a small metal toy) was also included within the cake. However, the inclusion of the prize was forbidden by the European Union for safety reasons. The Portuguese brought the recipe of the Gateau des Rois from France in the second half of the 19th century. To this day, this recipe is a very well kept secret.

In Lisbon, the New Year is celebrated with a grand concert. The New Year's Concert is held at the CCB (Centro Cultural de Belém) on the evening of 1 January, featuring the prestigious Lisbon Metropolitan Orchestra.

==== Romania ====
Romexpo indoors during Vanghelion New Year's Eve party.

Traditional celebrations of New Year's Eve (Revelion) are the norm in Romania. Romanians follow centuries-old customs, rituals, and conventions. Children sing "Plugușorul" and "Sorcova", traditional carols that wish goodwill, happiness and success.

Parties are common in the evening. Since the Romanian Revolution of 1989, Romanians have gathered in the University Square in Bucharest. Other significant parties occur in Piața Constituției. New Year's Eve is also marked by a national all-night telecast on Romanian Television, which also celebrates its anniversary on this holiday, having opened its doors in the New Year's Eve of 1956.

==== Russia ====
Midnight at Red Square in 2012.

The most prominent public celebration of the New Year is held at Moscow's Red Square under the Kremlin Clock—whose chimes at midnight are traditionally followed by the playing of the Russian national anthem, and a fireworks display. The President's New Year's address is televised shortly before midnight in each time zone, reflecting on the previous year and the state of the country. In 1999, unpopular president Boris Yeltsin famously announced his resignation during his New Year's address.

Novy God (Russian: Новый Год, lit. 'New Year') is celebrated as a gift-giving holiday with similarities to Christmas; New Year trees (yolka) are decorated and displayed in homes and public spaces, and Ded Moroz (Russian: Дед Мороз, lit. 'Father Frost') is depicted as delivering presents to children on New Year's Eve. with assistance from his granddaughter Snegurochka (Russian: Снегурочка, lit. 'the Snow Maiden').

The Novy God traditions were established under Soviet rule, when the Communist Party abolished Christmas and other religious holidays in 1928 as part of policies meant to curtail the practice of religion. In 1935, Soviet officials, including politician Pavel Postyshev, began promoting the New Year as a non-working holiday in the benefit of youth. Christmas traditions such as trees and a Santa Claus-like figure were adapted in a secular form. Even after the dissolution of the Soviet Union and the reinstatement of religious holidays, Novy God has remained a popular celebration in modern Russia, and among Soviet and Russian expats living in other countries.

Two Soviet comedy films set during the holiday—Carnival Night (1956) and The Irony of Fate (1976)—are often broadcast by Russian television channels on New Year's Eve, with the latter having been compared to the traditional Christmas Eve airing of It's a Wonderful Life in the United States. The Soviet variety show Little Blue Light traditionally broadcast a New Year's special, which was revived by Russia-1 in 1997.

==== Serbia ====
The Gregorian calendar was adopted by Yugoslavia in 1919, but the Serbian Orthodox Church continues to follow the Julian calendar, meaning that the new year is often celebrated twice. Prior to World War II, the New Year's holiday was celebrated more often by Serbs in urban regions, with large parties held on both 1 and 14 January. By contrast, residents of rural regions rarely celebrated the new year, and placed a larger focus on Christmas.

In 1945 after World War II, the League of Communists of Yugoslavia came into power, and the Kingdom of Yugoslavia was succeeded by the Socialist Federal Republic of Yugoslavia (SFR Yugoslavia). As in the Soviet Union, the communist government discouraged the observance of religious holidays, encouraged celebrations of the New Year on 1 January as a secular gift-giving holiday, and similarly adopted the figure of Ded Moroz as "Deda Mraz". Some residents (especially those in opposition to the communist government) continued to celebrate the Orthodox New Year, doing so quietly by candlelight in order to evade attention from authorities.

After the end of communist rule and the breakup of Yugoslavia, the Gregorian New Year (1 January) and the Serbian New Year (14 January) began to co-exist. Both holidays are marked by festivities in major Serbian cities, although festivities for the Serbian New Year (which, in 2013, was redesignated as a public holiday for the first time since 1918) are usually modest in comparison to their counterparts on 1 January.

==== Slovenia ====
As in the other constituents of SFR Yugoslavia, Christmas and other religious holidays were abolished by the communist government in the mid-1940s, with the New Year promoted as a secular holiday in the place of Saint Nicholas Day and Christmas. Ded Moroz is referred to in Slovenian as "Dedek Mraz", and was originally billed as having come from Siberia. After Yugoslavia broke from the Eastern Bloc, the character was stated to come from the Triglav mountain instead, and artist Maksim Gaspari created a new depiction of Dedek Mraz in traditional Slovenian apparel.

Saint Nicholas Day and Christmas were reinstated as holidays after the end of communist rule.

==== Spain ====
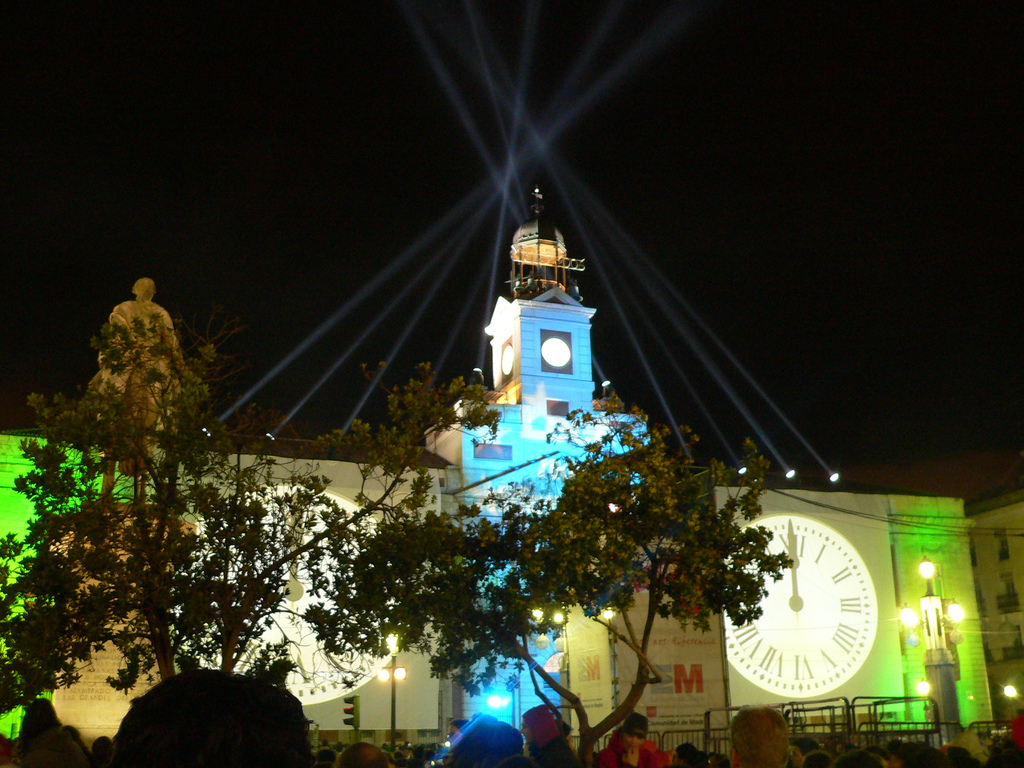
Madrid's Puerta del Sol on New Year's Eve, 2005.

In Spain, the main public celebration of New Year's Eve (Nochevieja, literally "Old Night", or Fin de Año) is held at Puerta del Sol in Madrid, where revellers await the midnight chimes of the clock tower at the Royal House of the Post Office. A notable Spanish tradition is to eat twelve grapes at midnight—one for each chime of the clock—which is said to bring luck and prosperity. The tradition dates back as early as 1895 but first gained wider attention in 1909, when it was promoted by Alicante grape growers to help spur sales of that year's surplus harvest. In the lead-up to the holiday, grocery stores are usually stocked with large amounts of grapes. The tradition has also been adopted in other communities with cultural ties to Spain or Latin America, including Hispanic and Latino Americans.

Typically, Spaniards celebrate the countdown to midnight with their families, and then attend afterparties known as cotillones de nochevieja that last into the following morning; these include smaller parties at bars, and larger-scale events at hotels. After midnight, Spaniards often drink sparkling wines such as cava and champagne.

Several Spanish television personalities have become well known for their involvement in New Year's specials, including Ramón García—who has hosted specials for Televisión Española (TVE) and Antena 3, and model Cristina Pedroche—who is known for the often-provocative dresses she has worn on-air.

A 10 km (6.2 mi) race known as the San Silvestre Vallecana is also held in Madrid on the evening of New Year's Eve, which includes an amateur fun run and a competitive event for elite athletes. In 2012 the event hosted a record of around 40,000 runners.

==== Sweden ====
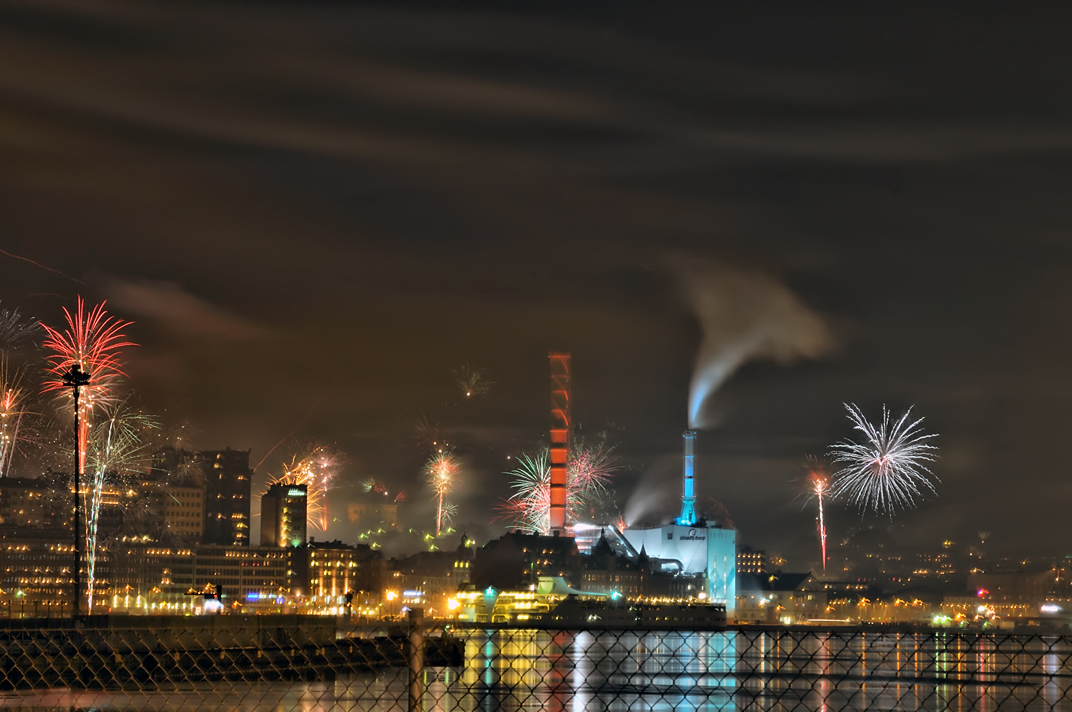
Gothenburg fireworks on New Year's Eve, 2008.

In Sweden, New Year's Eve is usually celebrated with families or with friends. A few hours before and after midnight, Swedish citizens usually party and eat a special dinner, often three courses. New Year's Eve is celebrated with large fireworks displays throughout the country, especially in the cities, major ones in particular having distinguishing celebrations. Swedish citizens over the age of 18 are allowed to buy fireworks, which are sold by local stores or by private people. While watching or lighting fireworks at midnight, Swedish citizens usually drink champagne.

On television, the lottery show BingoLotto features a special New Year's Eve edition to commemorate the holiday with musical guests, four bingo games, and surprises.

==== Switzerland ====
In Switzerland, New Year's Eve is typically celebrated in private gatherings or public events.

The final of the Spengler Cup ice hockey tournament is traditionally held on New Year's Eve.

==== Ukraine ====
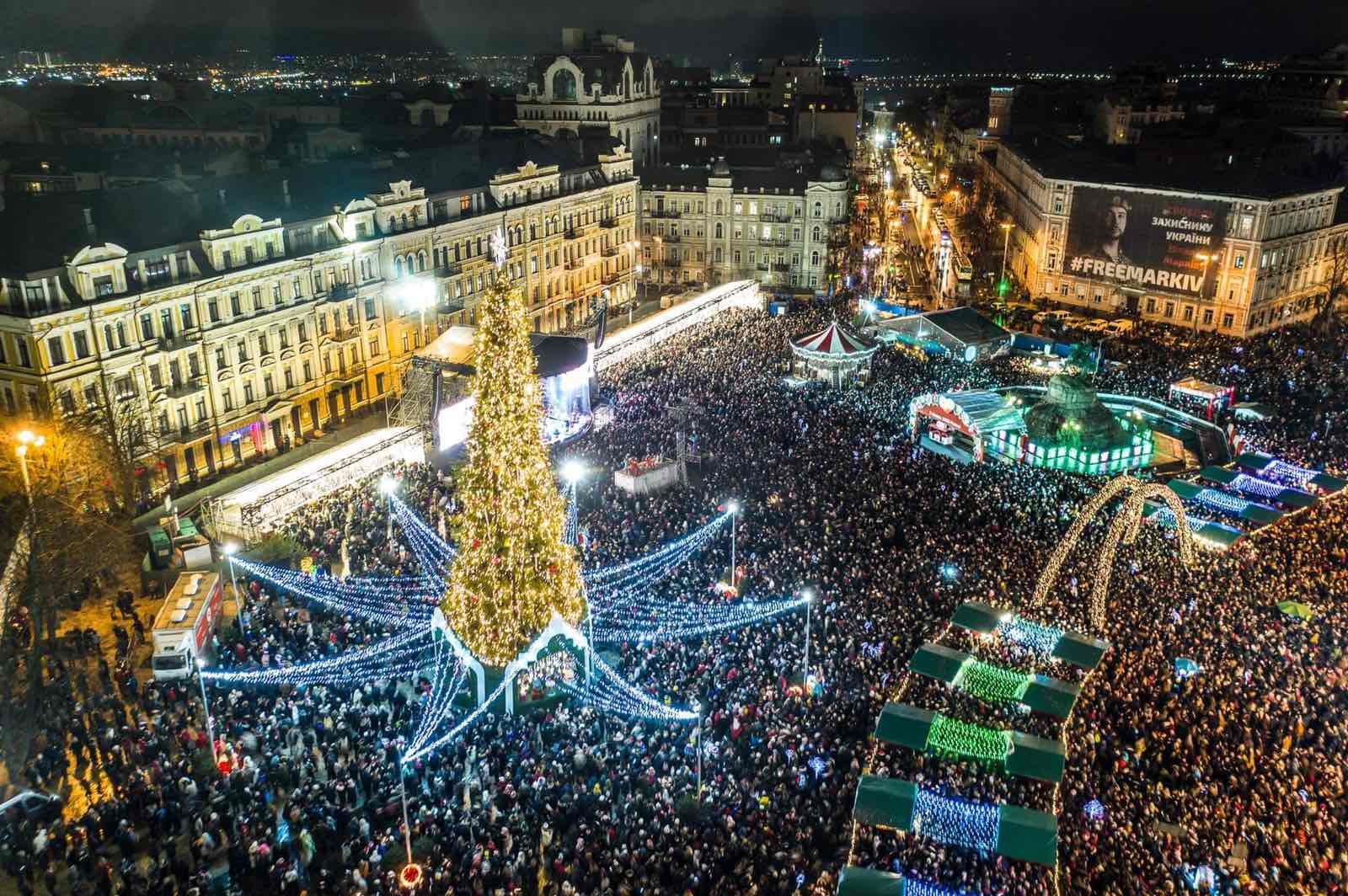
New Year celebration in Kyiv

The main public celebration is held at Maidan Nezalezhnosti in Kyiv, including concerts and a fireworks display. For 2013–14, amid the Euromaidan movement, it also included a world record attempt at the largest simultaneous singing of a national anthem. New Year's Eve also coincides with Malanka, a folk custom that has similarities to mummering.

Under Soviet rule, Ukrainian New Year's celebrations were patterned off the secular Novy God traditions, with Christmas (which, among those who practice Eastern Christianity, is held on 7 January) officially considered abolished—if not celebrated in secret by those opposed to the communist regime. Christmas regained prominence after the dissolution; figures such as Grandfather Frost were eventually displaced by Western figures such as Saint Nicholas and Santa Claus, and traditions associated with Novy God have been increasingly demonized by Ukrainians amid the Russo-Ukrainian war and the 2014 annexation of Crimea—such as yolka (New Year's trees) and the Soviet film The Irony of Fate (which was pulled by STB in 2015 as part of the Boycott Russian Films campaign).

==== United Kingdom ====
===== England =====
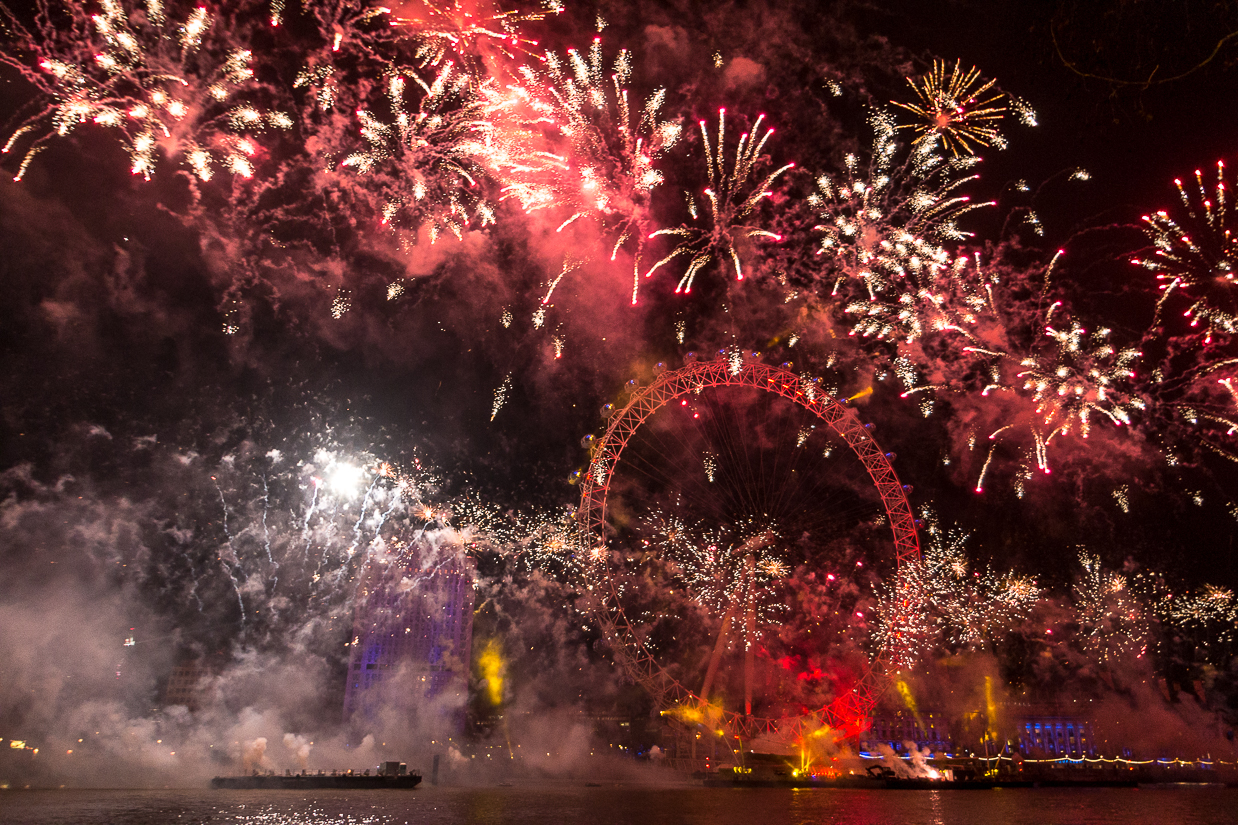
The London Eye serves as a focal point for London's New Year's fireworks.

The most prominent New Year's Eve (Old Year's Night) celebration in England is that of Central London, where the arrival of midnight is greeted with the chimes of Big Ben. Since 2004, a major fireworks display has also been held, with fireworks launched from the South Bank of the River Thames, and from the nearby London Eye observation wheel. On New Year's Eve 2010, an estimated 250,000 spectators gathered to view an eight-minute fireworks display around and above the London Eye which was, for the first time, set to a musical soundtrack. A drone show was added to the fireworks for the first time in 2021.

Other major New Year events are held in the cities of Birmingham, Manchester, Leeds, Liverpool, and Newcastle.

According to Thomas Lupton in the 16th century, a New Year's Eve tradition was to cover a leaf of ivy set in a dish of water, and check it five days later. A healthy leaf was said to predict a good year for the participant.

===== Scotland =====
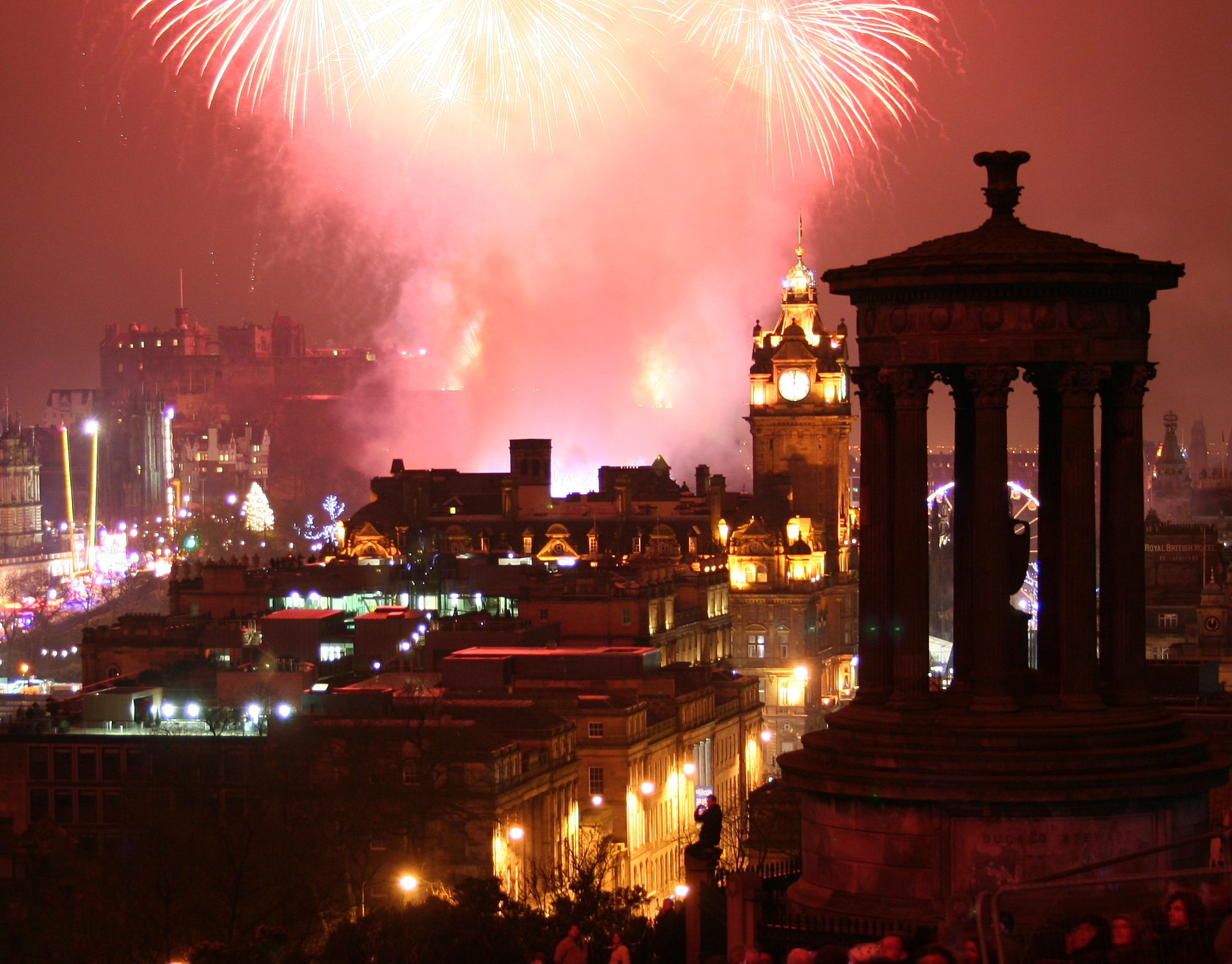
Hogmanay fireworks in Edinburgh.

In Scotland, the New Year—known as Hogmanay—is commonly celebrated through street parties and fireworks displays in major cities; both New Year's Day and 2 January are bank holidays in Scotland, and Christmas is not usually considered to be as prominent of an observance in the country. Prominent festivities on 31 December in Scotland include those held in the capital of Edinburgh (where several days of organised festivities, held from 28 December through 2 or 3 January, culminate with the firing of cannons at Edinburgh Castle and fireworks at midnight), and the town of Stonehaven near Aberdeen (where a procession of paraders swing "fireballs" around their heads made from chicken wire and other flammable scrap at midnight, which are believed to ward off spirits).

"Auld Lang Syne" is traditionally sung after midnight at gatherings, with participants traditionally forming a circle with other revellers, and joining hands during the final verse. Hogmanay is also associated with the custom of first-footing—in which the first person to enter someone's home after midnight is meant to bring a gift symbolizing prosperity for the new year (such as a loaf of black bun or shortbread, a lump of coal or salt, and/or whisky).

From 1953 to 1985, Hogmanay had received exposure across the entire United Kingdom via the BBC, who televised BBC Scotland-produced specials such as The White Heather Club as part of their New Year's Eve programming. The specials were often lambasted by critics for their stereotypical portrayal of Scottish culture, but were popular enough to spawn competitors on ITV. The practice ended after 1985, when the poor reception to that year's Live into 85 led to the BBC, among others, abandoning the concept altogether. BBC One Scotland has since continued to air a local Hogmanay special featuring coverage from Edinburgh as a regional opt-out, with the rest of the network taking England-centric specials (albeit with exceptions in 1998–99, when BBC One networked an Edinburgh-based New Year Live special that would turn out to be equally-shambolic, and 2002–03, where BBC One carried a straight simulcast of Hogmanay Live).

===== Wales =====
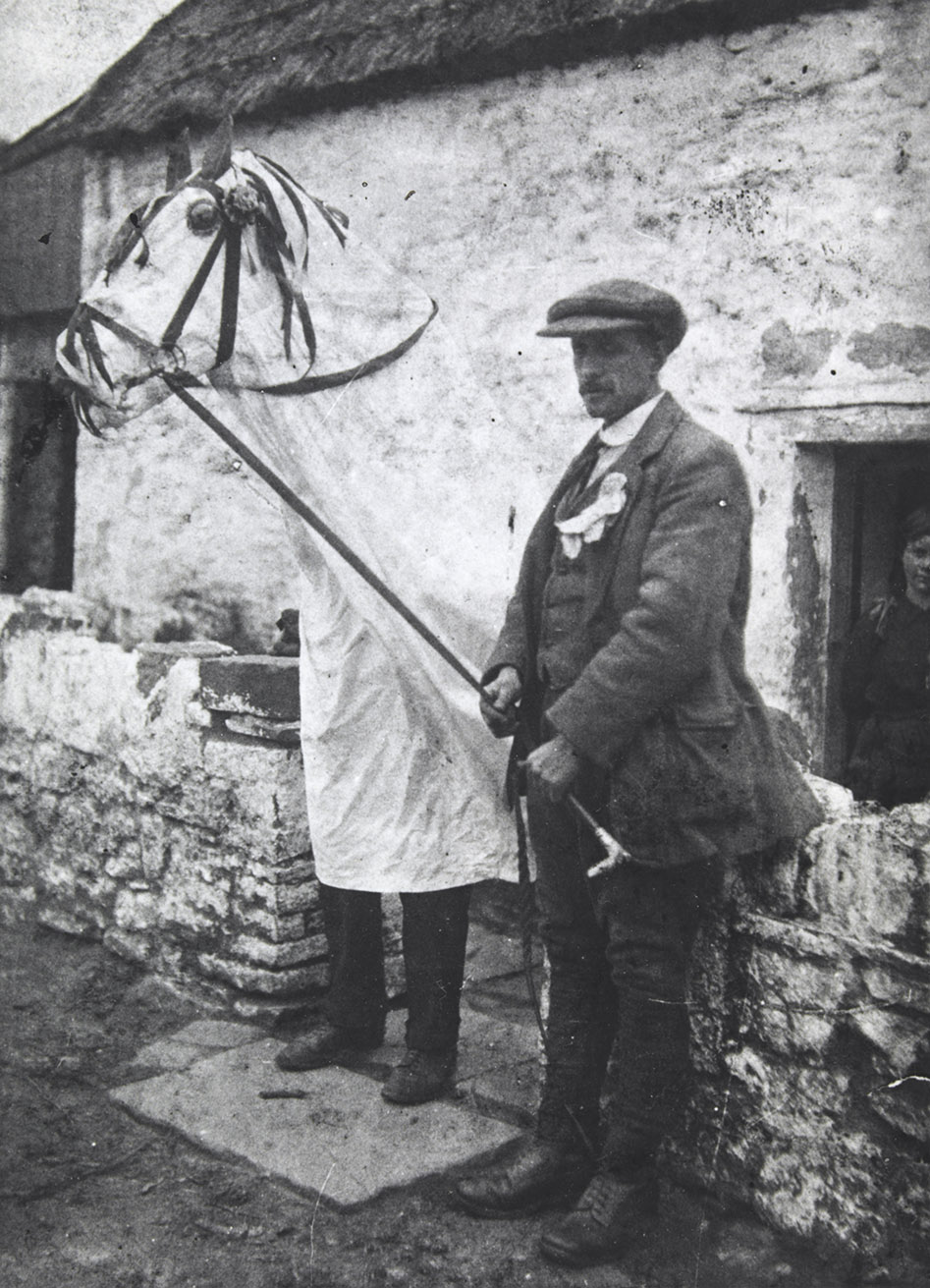
A Mari Lwyd c. 1910–1914. Traditionally carried from door to door during Calennig in Wales

The Welsh tradition of giving gifts and money on New Year's Day (Welsh: Calennig) is an ancient custom that survives in modern-day Wales. Groups of singers, such as children or young people, go around the houses of their local area and sing a new years song to wish a happy new year. The custom, similar to carol singing, leads to the group receiving money for their performance. This custom is also coupled with the tradition wassailing in the presence of Mari Lwyd (a horse's head mounted on a pole).

In Cwm Gwaun, Pembrokeshire, the tradition of observing the Old New Year (on the 13 January) is still followed with similar festivities including Calennig.

Thousands of Welsh citizens descend every year on Cardiff to enjoy live music, catering, ice-skating, funfairs, and fireworks. Many of the celebrations take place at Cardiff Castle and Cardiff City Hall.

Every New Year's Eve, the Nos Galan road race (Rasys Nos Galan), a five-kilometre (3.1 mi) running contest, is held in Mountain Ash in the Cynon Valley, Rhondda Cynon Taf, South Wales. The race celebrates the life and achievements of Welsh runner Guto Nyth Brân.

Founded in 1958 by local runner Bernard Baldwin, it is run over the five-kilometre route of Guto's first competitive race. The main race starts with a church service at Llanwynno, and then a wreath is laid on Guto's grave in Llanwynno graveyard. After lighting a torch, it is carried to the nearby town of Mountain Ash, where the main race takes place.

The race consists of a double circuit of the town Centre, starting in Henry Street and ending in Oxford Street, by the commemorative statue of Guto. Traditionally, the race was timed to end at midnight, but in recent times it was rescheduled for the convenience of family entertainment, now concluding at around 9 pm.

This has resulted in a growth in size and scale, and the proceedings now start with an afternoon of street entertainment, and fun run races for children, concluding with the church service, elite runners' race, and presentations.

=== North America ===
==== Canada ====
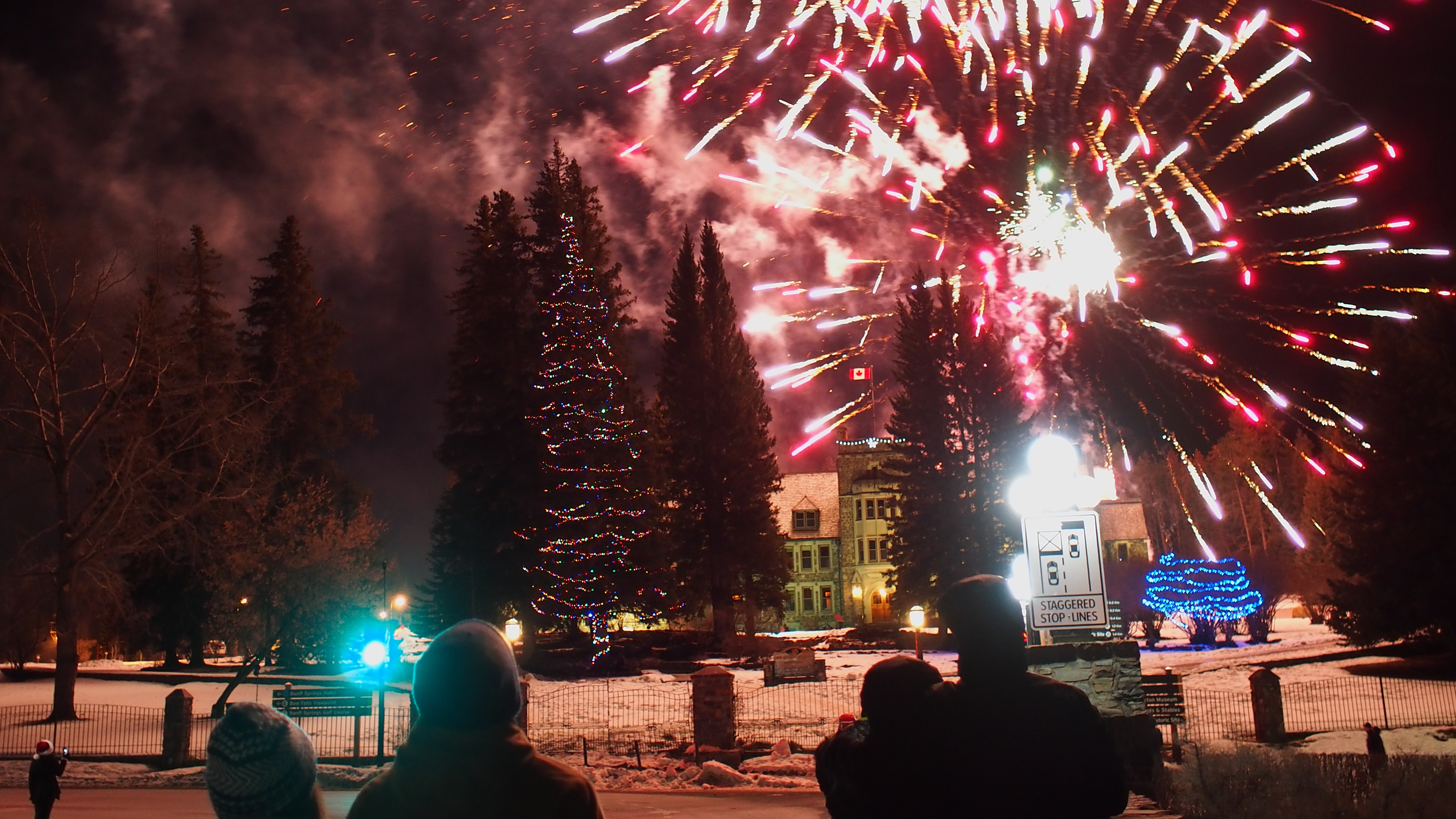
Fireworks at Banff, Alberta 2015.

New Year's Eve traditions and celebrations in Canada vary regionally, but are typically similar to those in the United States, with a focus on social gatherings and public celebrations (such as concerts and fireworks displays). The Canadian men's junior hockey team has usually played their final preliminary round game at the IIHF World Junior Championship on New Year's Eve.

The CBC's English- and French-language television networks have been well known for airing sketch comedy specials on New Year's Eve, lampooning the major events and news stories of the year. From 1992 through 2019, CBC Television aired Year of the Farce, an annual special produced by the radio comedy troupe Royal Canadian Air Farce. The special became part of a weekly Royal Canadian Air Farce television series beginning in 1993, while the 2008 edition doubled as the program's series finale. The troupe continued to produce Year of the Farce as an annual reunion special until 2019. In 2024, the CBC's news satire series This Hour Has 22 Minutes took on a similar role with an hour-long "New Year's Eve Pregame" special.

The CBC's French network Ici Radio-Canada Télé airs a similar special, Bye Bye, which has been presented by various comedians and troupes, Originally running from 1968 to 1998, it was revived in 2006 by the Québécois troupe Rock et Belles Oreilles to mark its 25th anniversary. The program has continued to air annually since, although it was placed on hiatus for 2009 after the previous year's edition was criticized by viewers for sketches they deemed to be derogatory and racist. Four out of the five highest-rated television broadcasts in Quebecois history have been editions of Bye Bye, with the 2021 edition being seen by a record 4.862 million viewers.

Beginning in 2017 (with the inaugural edition marking the beginning of the country's sesquicentennial year), CBC Television has broadcast a more traditional countdown special: a localized version was broadcast for each time zone, which features music performances, and coverage of midnight festivities from communities across the country. Rick Mercer hosted the majority of these specials. The special was placed on hiatus in 2023 due to financial issues (with the network airing the premiere of a Mae Martin stand-up comedy special in its place), but revived in 2024 across CBC and CBC News Network.

==== Costa Rica ====
In Costa Rica, families usually gather around 8 pm for parties that last until 1 or 2 am, the next day. There are several traditions among Costa Rican families, including eating 12 grapes representing 12 wishes for the new year, and running across the street with luggage to bring new trips and adventures in the upcoming year.

==== El Salvador ====
In El Salvador, New Year's Eve is spent with families. Family parties start around 5:00 pm, and last until 1:00 to 3:00 am, the following day. Families eat dinner together and sing traditional New Year's Eve songs, such as "Cinco para las Doce". After the dinner, individuals light fireworks and continue partying outside. A radio station broadcasts a countdown to midnight. When the clock strikes midnight, fireworks are lit across the country. Salvadorans start exchanging hugs and wishes for the new year.

The main event takes place at midnight where fireworks are lit along with thousands of life-size effigies called "Año Viejo". Almost every local family will either make such an effigy from scraps of paper and old clothes or buy one ready-made. The effigy is placed just outside the front of their home. Such effigies represent the things people hated about the departing year and are fashioned to resemble celebrities, politicians, public servants, cartoon characters etc. They are burnt on the stroke of midnight to banish the old year and mark a fresh start in the new. Some of the braver Salvadorans jump through these burning effigies 12 times to represent a wish for every month.

==== Guatemala ====
In Guatemala, banks close on New Year's Eve, and businesses close at noon. In the town of Antigua, Guatemalans usually gather at the Santa Catalina Clock Arch to celebrate New Year's Eve (Spanish: Fin del Año). In Guatemala City the celebrations are centered on Plaza Mayor. Firecrackers are lit starting at sundown, continuing without interruption into the night. Guatemalans wear new clothes for good fortune and eat a grape with each of the twelve chimes of the bell during the New Year countdown, while making a wish with each one.

The celebrations include religious themes which may be either Mayan or Catholic. Catholic celebrations are similar to those at Christmas. Gifts are left under the tree on Christmas morning by the Christ Child for the children, but parents and adults do not exchange gifts until New Year's Day.

==== Mexico ====
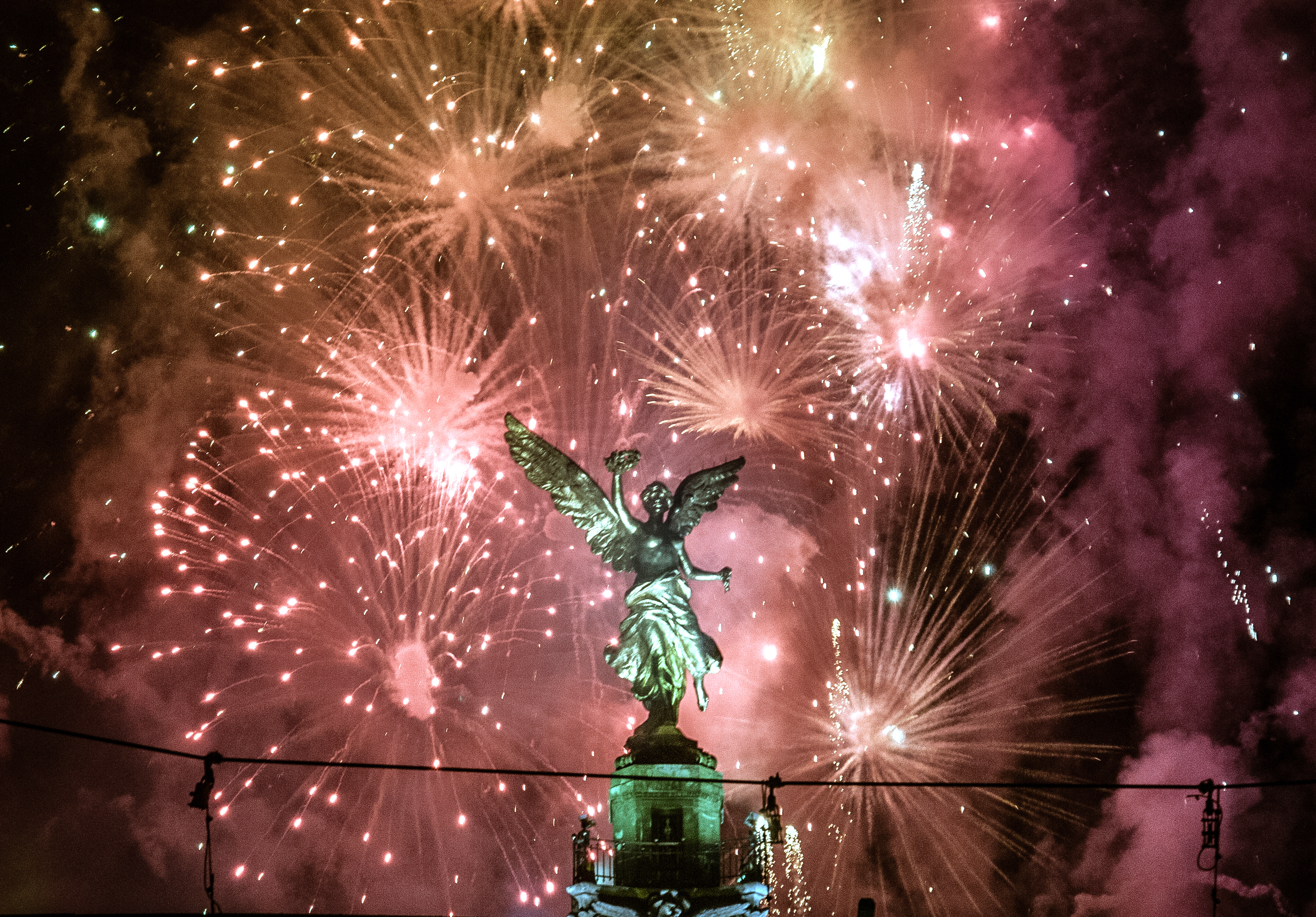
Fireworks at Angel of Independence in Mexico City 2013.

Mexicans celebrate New Year's Eve (Spanish: "Fin de Año" or "Nochevieja") observing many traditions, including the Spanish tradition of eating a grape with each of the twelve chimes of a clock's bell during the midnight countdown, while making a wish with each one. Mexican families decorate homes and parties in colors that represent wishes for the upcoming year: red encourages an overall improvement of lifestyle and love, yellow encourages blessings of improved employment conditions, green for improved financial circumstances, and white for improved health. Mexican sweet bread is baked with a coin or charm hidden in the dough. When the bread is served, the recipient of the slice with the coin or charm is said to be blessed with good luck in the New Year. Another tradition is to make a list of all the bad or unhappy events over the past 12 months; before midnight, this list is thrown into a fire, symbolizing the removal of negative energy from the new year. At the same time, they are expressed for all the good things during the year that is ending so that they will continue in the new year.

Mexicans celebrate with a late-night dinner with their families, the traditional meal being turkey or pork loin. Afterwards many Mexicans attend parties outside the home, for example, in night clubs. In Mexico City the national street festival on New Year's Eve takes place on the Zocalo, the city's main square. Though in recent years, the main public celebration has taken place in Paseo de la Reforma, near the Angel. After the twelfth chime, Mexicans will shout and wish each other a "¡Feliz Año Nuevo!" (transl. Happy New Year!) and, in many places, celebrations also include fireworks, firecrackers and sparklers. Celebrations there are either Spanish in origin or those adding influences of Aztec nature.

==== Panama ====
In Panama, Panamanians usually celebrate New Year's Eve with a dinner, followed by multiple individual fireworks celebrations. Fireworks begin around 11 pm for parties that last until 1 am, the next day. Many Panamanians leave the city and go to the rural towns across the country, to celebrate with families and friends.

==== Trinidad and Tobago ====
In Port of Spain the tradition is to celebrate in one's yard with friends, families and neighbors, and eat and drink till sunrise. At midnight the city becomes festive with fireworks in every direction. The celebration only starts at midnight. Music is heard from all the houses and bars, nightclubs, street parties, and Soca raves. Trinidadians and Tobagonians celebrate not only the new year but the beginning of the carnival season as well.

==== United States ====
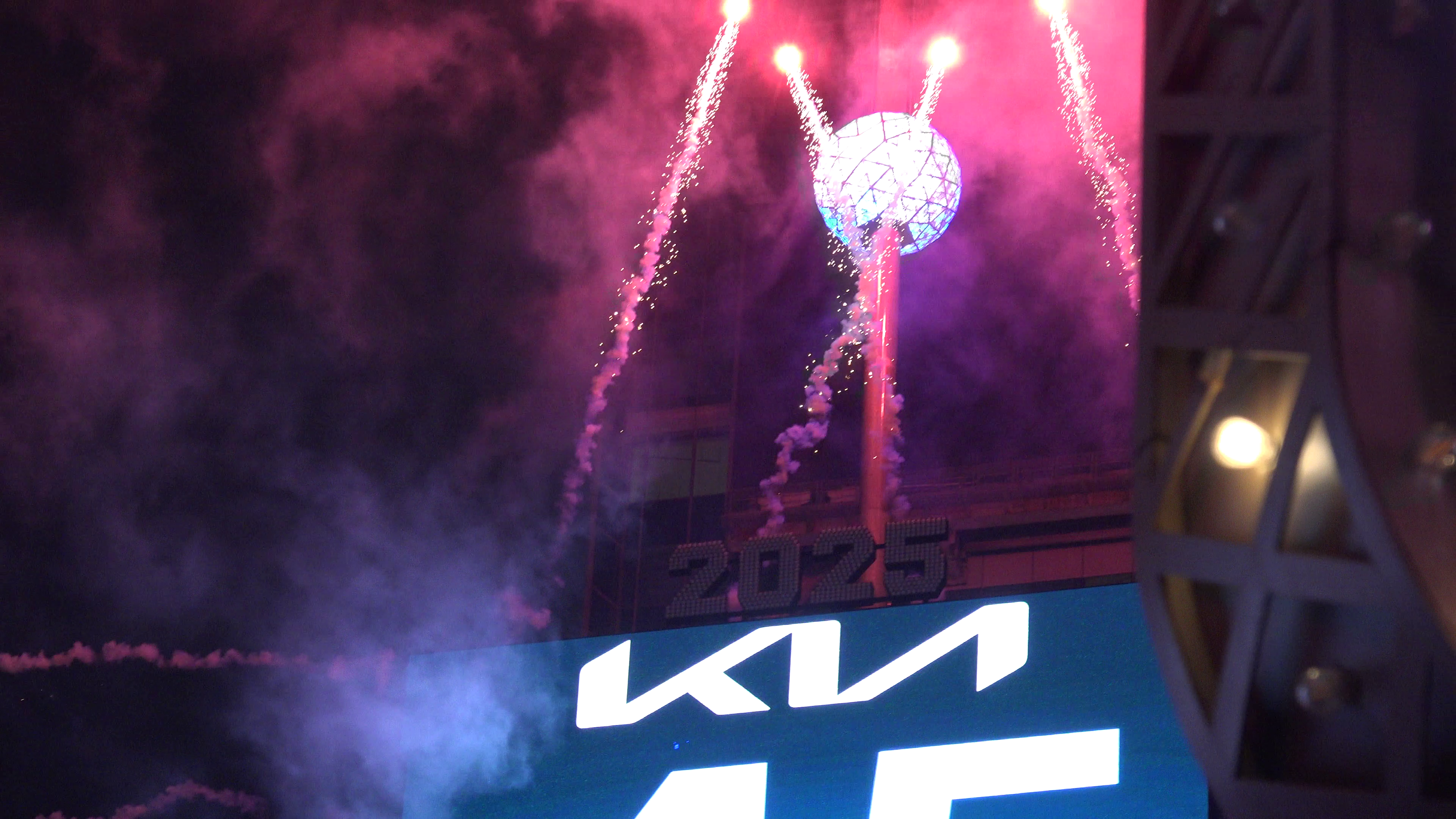
The Times Square Ball descending during the final seconds of 2024 in Times Square.

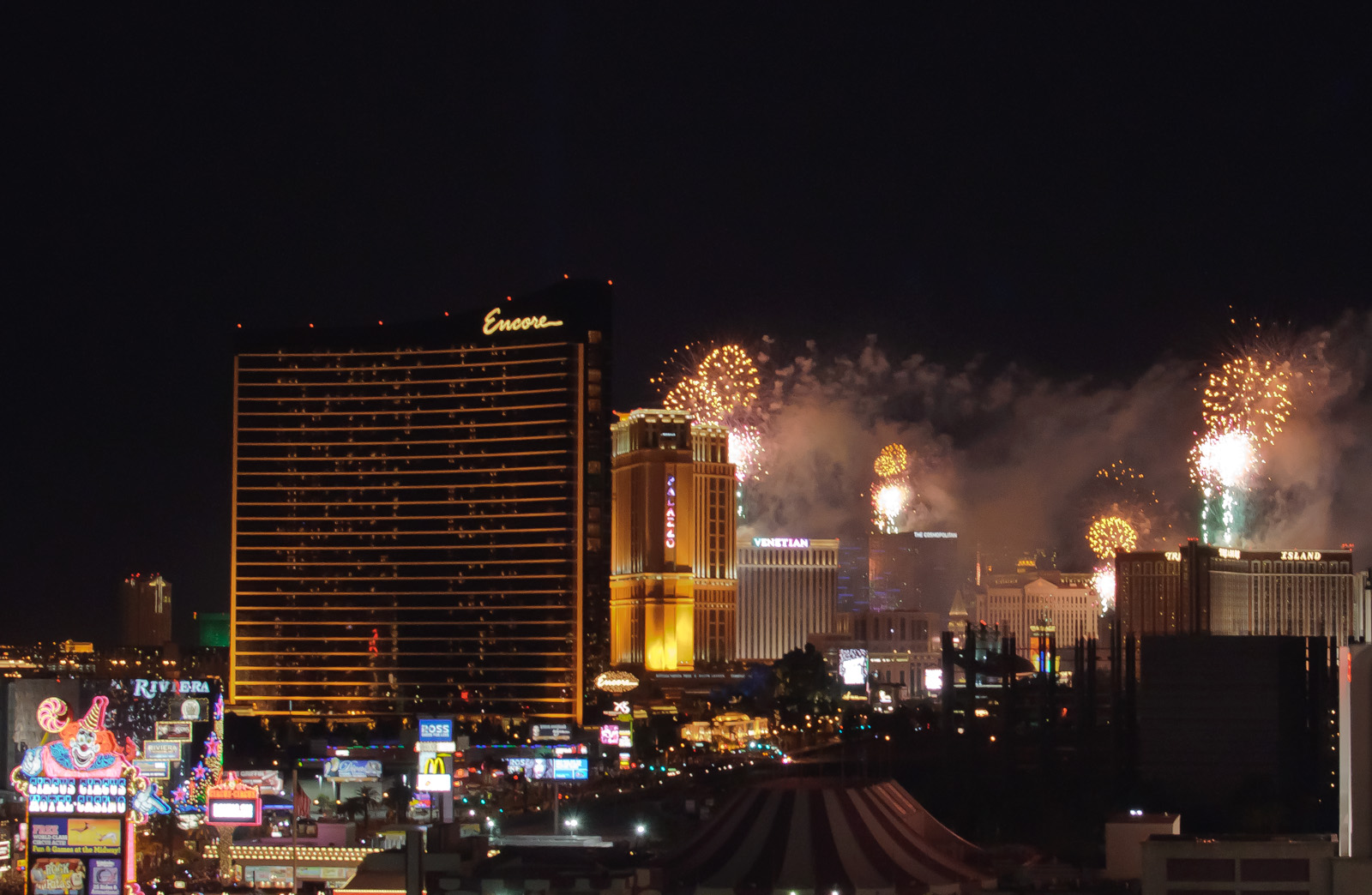
Fireworks on the Las Vegas Strip in 2013.

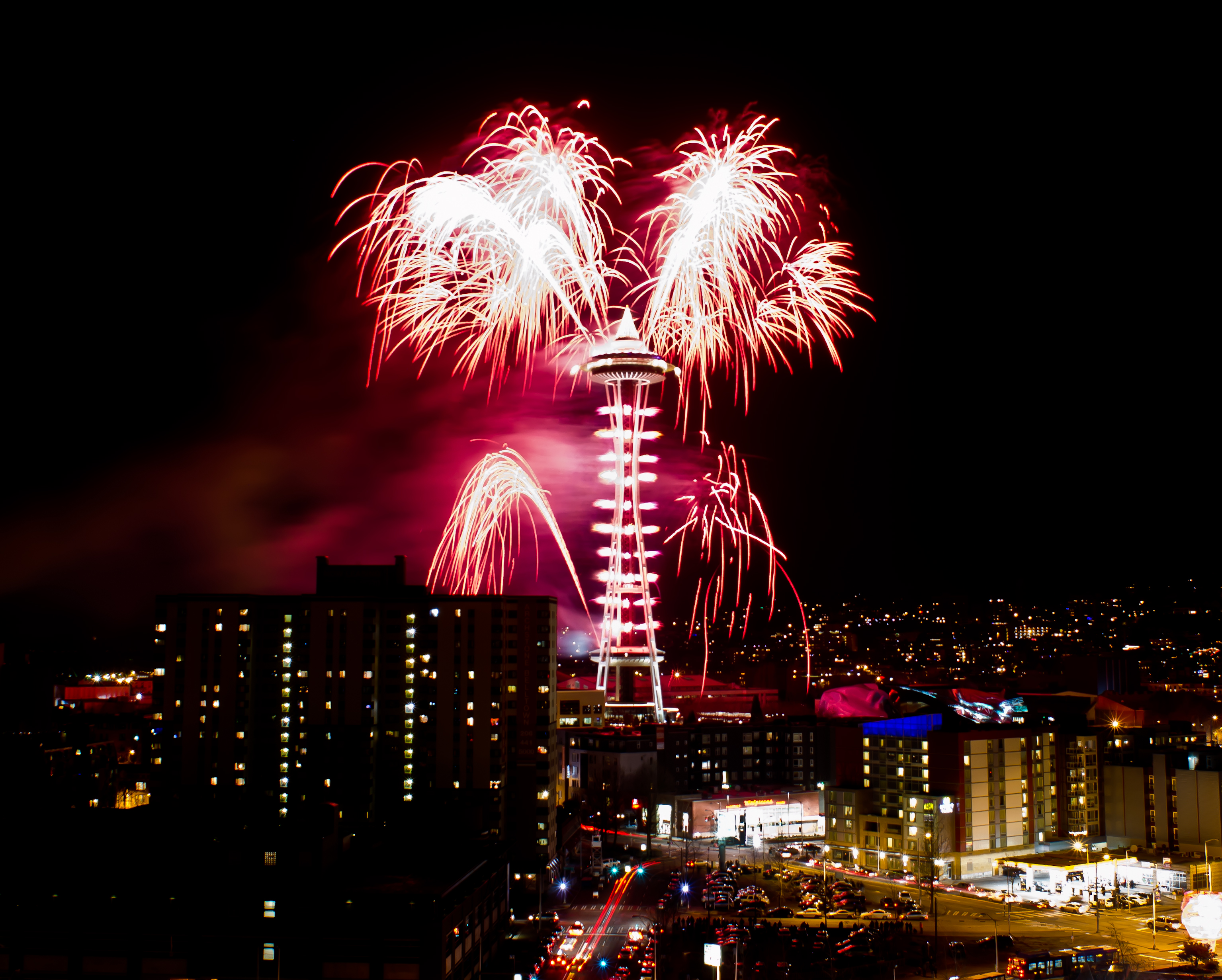
Fireworks on the Space Needle in Seattle in 2011.

In the United States, New Year's Eve is celebrated via a variety of social gatherings, and large-scale public events such as concerts, fireworks shows, and "drops"—an event inspired by time balls where an item is lowered or raised over the course of the final minute of the year.

Drop events are typically patterned after the annual "ball drop" held at New York City's Times Square, where an illuminated ball is lowered down a 21-metre-high (70 ft) pole on the roof of One Times Square. The event has been held since 1907; the ball itself—which is adorned with Waterford Crystal panels and an LED lighting system—has been displayed atop the building year-round since 2008. Its most recent iteration, which debuted in 2026, is 12.5 feet (3.8 m) in diameter, weighs 5,600 kilograms (12,300 lb), and is adorned with over 5,000 circular panels. Drop events often use either a ball in imitation of Times Square, or items that represent local culture or history (such as Atlanta's Peach Drop, which reflects Georgia's identity as the "Peach State").

New York City and Times Square serve as the focal point for national media coverage of the holiday. Bandleader Guy Lombardo and his band—The Royal Canadians—were well known for their annual broadcast from New York City. Their signature performance of "Auld Lang Syne" at midnight helped make the standard synonymous with the holiday in North America. Beginning on radio in 1929, Lombardo moved to CBS television from 1956 to 1976, adding coverage of the ball drop. Following Lombardo's death, Dick Clark's New Year's Rockin' Eve (which premiered for 1973 on NBC, and moved to ABC for 1975) became the dominant New Year's Eve special on U.S. television—especially among younger viewers—with Dick Clark having anchored New Year's coverage (including New Year's Rockin' Eve and the one-off ABC 2000 Today) for 32 straight years. After Clark suffered a stroke in December 2004, Regis Philbin guest hosted the 2005 edition. Due to a lingering speech impediment brought upon by the stroke, Clark retired as host and was succeeded by Ryan Seacrest for 2006 (who later served as the executive producer of the special), but continued making limited appearances on the special until his death in 2012.

Other notable New Year's events are held in New York besides those in Times Square; since 1984, the Cathedral of St. John the Divine in Manhattan has hosted the annual "New Year's Eve Concert for Peace", which was founded in 1984 by composer Leonard Bernstein. The New York Road Runners hosts a "Midnight Run" event at Central Park, which features a fireworks show and a footrace around the park that begins at midnight.

Other notable celebrations include the Las Vegas Strip's "America's Party", which consists of a ticketed concert event at the Fremont Street Experience, and a public fireworks show at midnight that is launched from various casino resorts on the Strip. Nashville has typically held concerts featuring country music performers and a music note drop; since 2021, the festivities have been televised by CBS as part of its special New Year's Eve Live: Nashville's Big Bash. Los Angeles, a city long without a major public New Year celebration, held an inaugural gathering in Downtown's newly completed Grand Park to celebrate the arrival of 2014. The event included food trucks, art installations, and culminated with a projection mapping show on the side of Los Angeles City Hall near midnight. The inaugural event drew over 25,000 spectators and participants. For 2016, Chicago introduced an event known as Chi-Town Rising. In Miami, major celebrations are centered around the downtown core, including the raising of the "Big Orange" on the side of the InterContinental Miami hotel, and concerts at Bayfront Park (which were televised as a New Year's special on Fox, Pitbull's New Year's Revolution, until 2017–18).

Major theme parks often hold New Year's Eve celebrations, including extended operating hours, live entertainment, and one or more fireworks shows (with Disney parks often presenting special editions of nighttime shows such as Fantasy in the Sky). Walt Disney World Resort and Universal Orlando in Orlando, Florida, as well as Disneyland and Universal Studios Hollywood in California, are traditionally the busiest around the Christmas and New Year's holidays.

=== Oceania ===
==== Australia ====
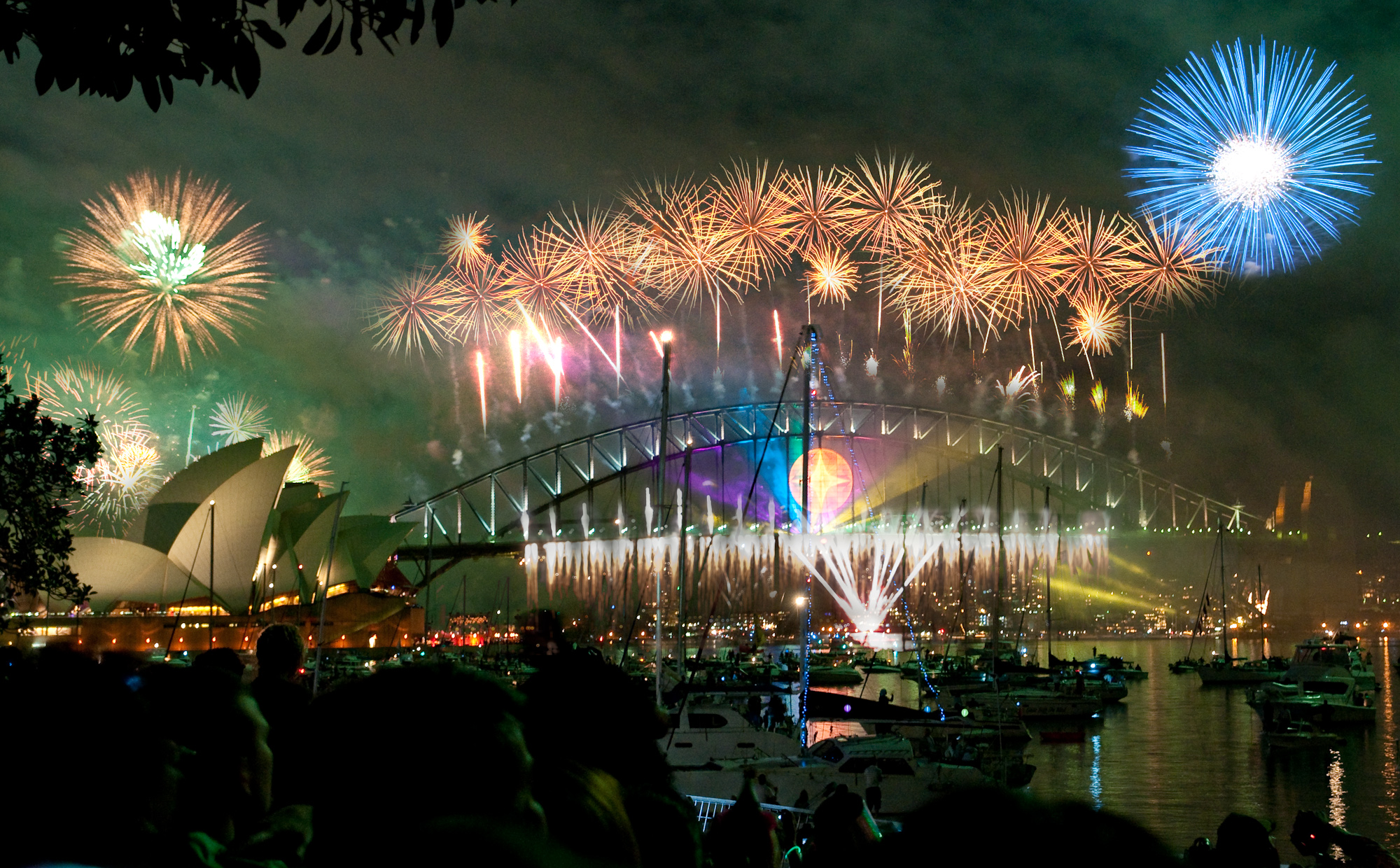
Sydney's New Year's fireworks show in 2009.

Falling in summer in the Southern Hemisphere, New Year's Eve is often celebrated via public events including fireworks shows, exhibitions, and concerts, Many are concentrated towards the country's beaches, and attract tourism from other parts of the world.

The most prominent celebration in the country is Sydney New Year's Eve, which takes place at Sydney Harbour and consists of two fireworks shows—an evening show held at 9:00 p.m.(initially billed as the "Family Fireworks", but now known as the "Calling Country Fireworks" and themed around First Nations communities), followed by the main show at midnight. Sydney Harbour Bridge is a focal point of the show, via pyrotechnics launched from the bridge, as well as lighting displays that illuminate it during the show—colloquially known as the "bridge effect", and previously taking the form of a symbol on its trusses that reflected an annual theme. The event has been televised by the Australian Broadcasting Corporation since 2013, and broadcast to a global audience.

Other major Australian cities also host fireworks events, including Brisbane's Lord Mayor's New Year's Eve Fireworks on the Brisbane River, and Melbourne (which are launched from various locations in the city's central business district, and have attracted upwards of 400,000 spectators), Perth, Semaphore, and Hobart. Celebrations have also been held in remote locations in the Outback: at Cameron Corner—a location near the border between New South Wales, Queensland, and South Australia—a pub has traditionally celebrated for all three of their respective time zones in succession.

==== Kiribati ====
The parts of the Line Islands belonging to Kiribati, including Kiritimati, Tabuaeran and Teraina, are the first parts of the world to welcome the New Year as they are on the furthermost time zone at UTC+14:00. Other Kiribati islands follow at UTC+13:00 and UTC+12:00.

==== New Zealand ====
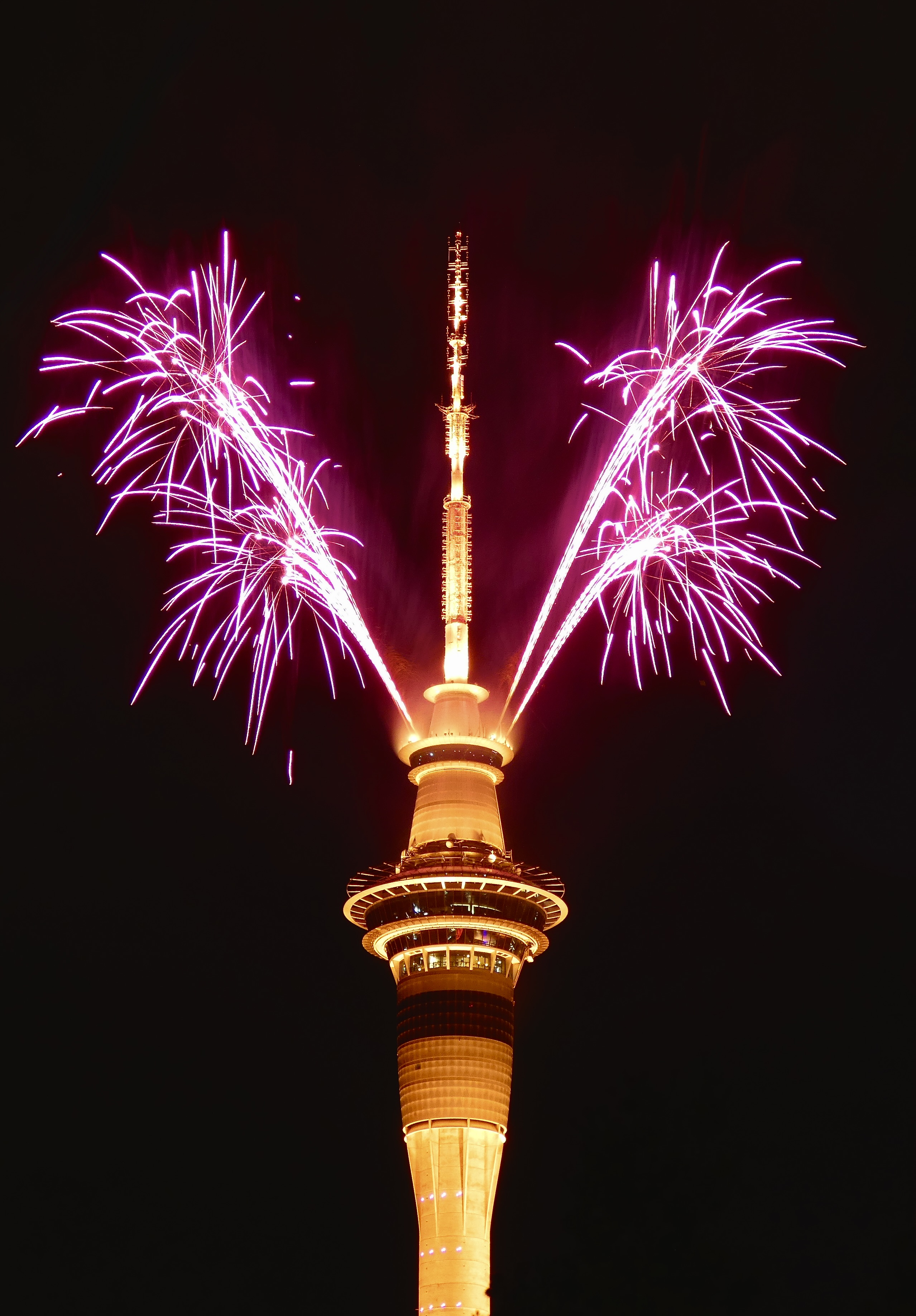
Fireworks in Auckland, New Zealand for the 2023 New Year taking place on the Sky Tower

Many of New Zealand's cities and towns see in the new year with open-air concerts and fireworks displays.

Auckland regularly has a fireworks display at midnight from the top of the Sky Tower. In Wellington, Frank Kitts Park is the venue for a festival including fireworks, music, and open-air film displays. Similar events occur in Hamilton, starting with a family-friendly event at Steele Park, followed by an adult-specific party at SkyCity Hamilton. Gisborne, one of the first cities in the world to see sunrise at new year also celebrates with a new year festival. The small town of Whangamata, on the Coromandel Peninsula, is a major party venue in the new year, especially for Aucklanders.

In the South Island, both Christchurch and Dunedin host free live music concerts culminating with a midnight fireworks display. These are held at Hagley Park and The Octagon respectively. The South Island's main resort town, Queenstown is also a major new year party venue, with music and fireworks.

==== Samoa ====
Samoa was the first country to receive the New Year as a whole from 2011 to 2021, when it used UTC+14:00 as its time zone during the Southern Hemisphere summer, sharing it with the Line Islands of Kiribati.

=== South America ===
==== Argentina ====
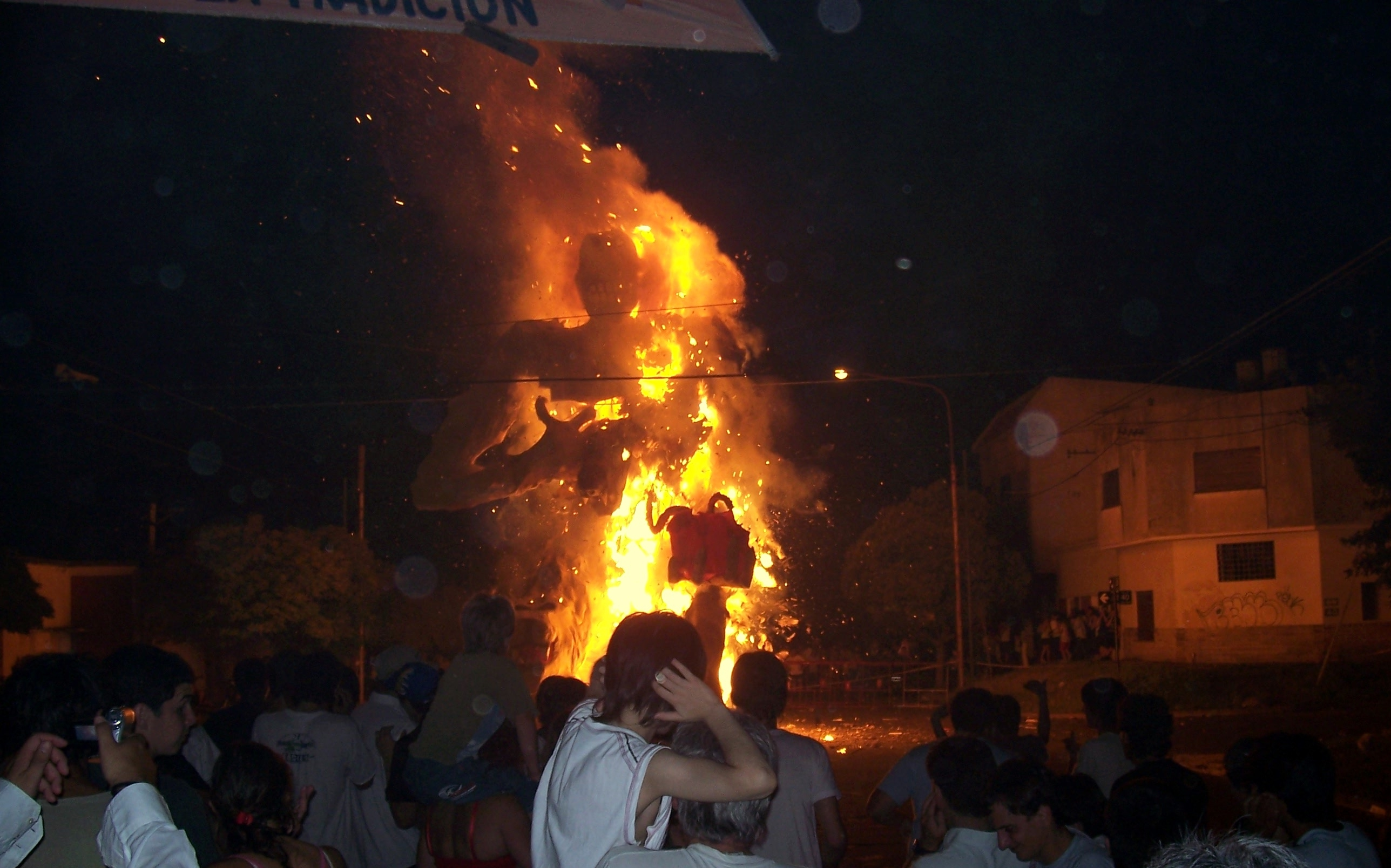
The burning of dolls is a local tradition in the city of La Plata.

Traditional celebrations in Argentina include a family dinner of traditional dishes, including vitel tonné, asado, sandwiches de miga, piononos. Like dessert: turrón, mantecol, budín and pan dulce.

Just at midnight signalling the first day of the New Year, Argentines wish each other their regards and share toasts with their families, sometimes with the neighbours, with cider, champagne or alcohol. After it, some flock to the streets to enjoy and light firecrackers and fireworks, although each year it has been gradually decreasing due to higher awareness of the danger of it and the economic crisis. Parties often continue until dawn or the early morning.

Citizens in La Plata have a long tradition of making giant dolls, mostly of paper and wood, although sometimes also incorporating fireworks, which are burnt after the stroke of midnight.

The celebration is during the summer, like in many South American countries, so many families in the New Year are seen at tourist centers of the Argentine Atlantic coast (Mar del Plata, Mar de Ajó, Villa Gesell, Miramar, etc.).

==== Brazil ====
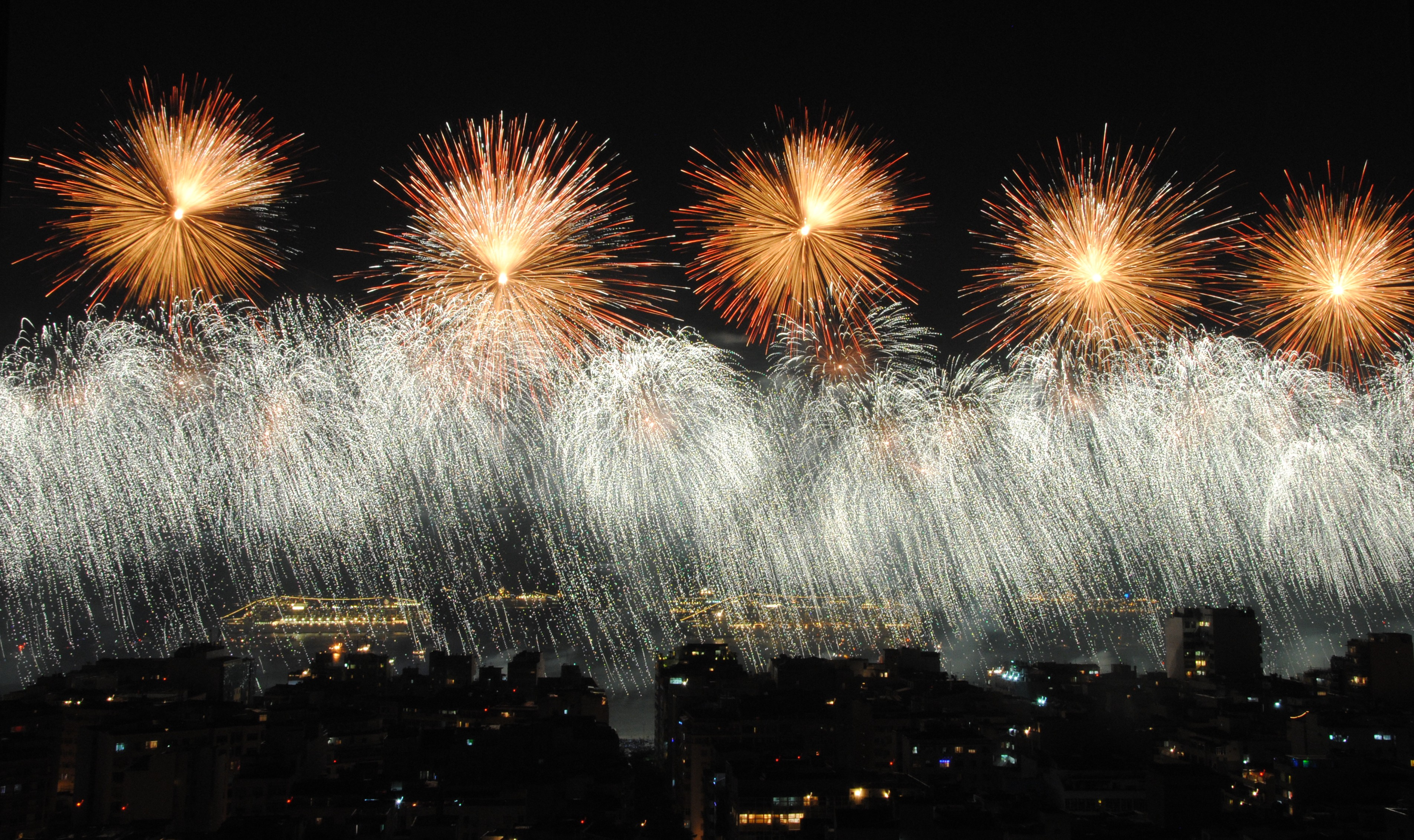
Rio de Janeiro hosts one of the world's largest fireworks displays on Copacabana New Year's Eve, attracting over a million spectators.

In Brazil, Brazilians typically celebrate New Year's Eve (Portuguese: Ano Novo or Réveillon) at large parties hosted by restaurants and clubs; local traditions determine who opens a bottle of Champagne at midnight. People often wear colors with religious symbolism on New Year's Eve, such as white for good luck, yellow for good energies, happiness and money, red for love. Rituals such as the consumption of grapes, lychees and lentils also take place due to this mixture.

The most prominent public celebration in Brazil is a fireworks display on Copacabana Beach in Rio de Janeiro, which is one of the world's largest - justified as much of the nation is south of the Equator, the celebrations are held in summer time. In 2017, it was estimated that the fireworks would attract over three million spectators to welcome 2018. Beaches in major cities and tourist areas are crowded all day long especially for nighttime events. On television, the most prominent New Year's Eve special is TV Globo's Show da Virada, which features pre-recorded concert performances (usually filmed from a different Brazilian city annually), and live coverage of New Year's celebrations across the country.

Brasília holds a public celebration on the Monumental Axis or Estádio Nacional Mané Garrincha. Celebrations in Manaus are centered upon a fireworks display on the Rio Negro Bridge, while Paulista Avenue hosts the main celebration in São Paulo, Brazil's largest city.

Another notable New Year's Eve tradition in São Paulo is the Saint Silvester Road Race, a 15K run through the city's Central Zone. Held annually since 1925, its route incorporates several major streets and landmarks, including the Viaduto do Chá and Paulista Avenue.

==== Chile ====
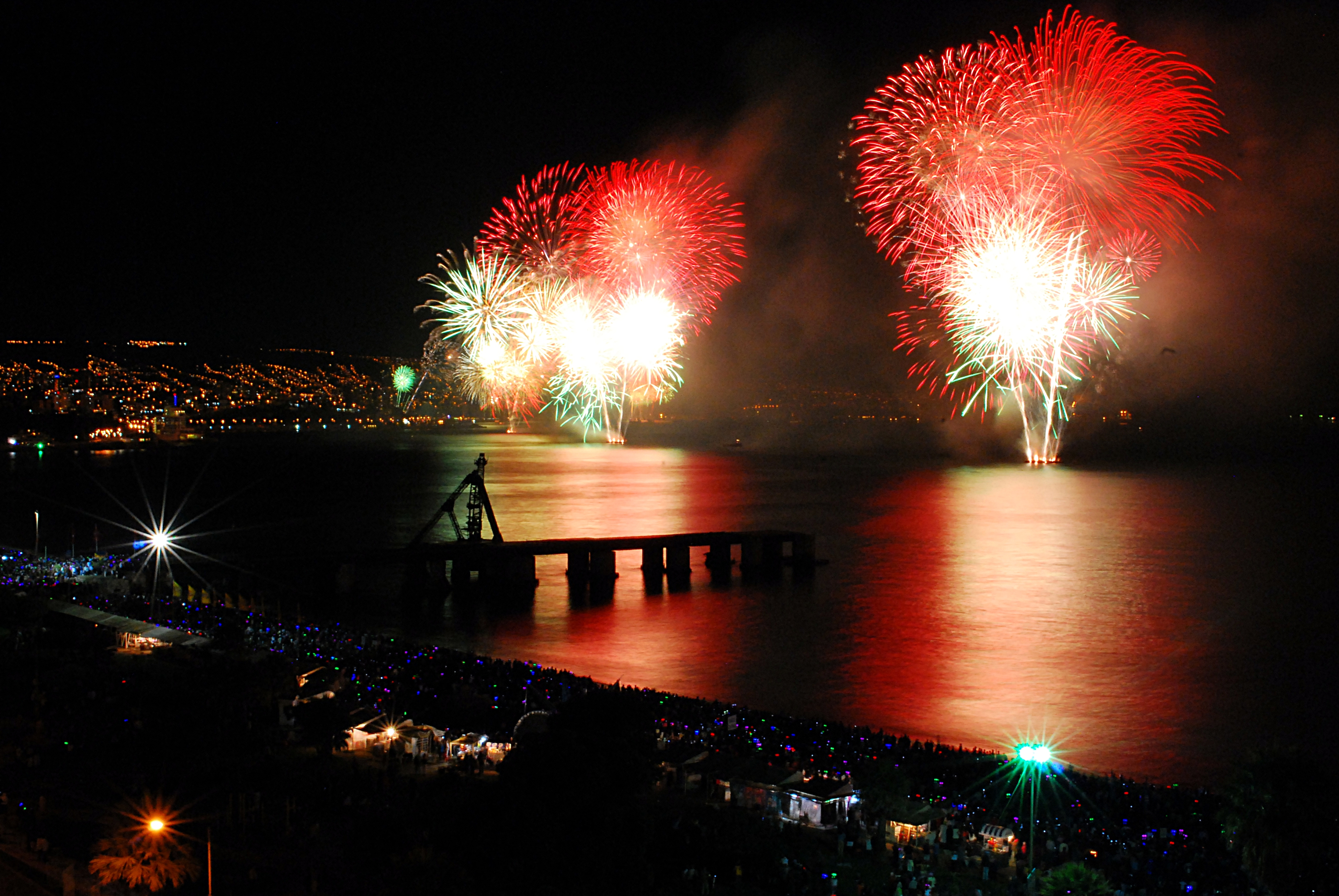
Over one million visitors crowd the streets and beaches of Valparaíso each New Year's Eve.

New Year's Eve is celebrated in Chile by the observation of various traditions, such as wearing yellow underwear and watching fireworks. Chileans who want to travel walk the streets with a suitcase in hand, others hold money in their hand or place coins at their door for good fortune in the new year. Celebrations include a family dinner with special dishes, usually lentils for good luck, and twelve grapes to symbolize wishes for each month of the coming year. Family celebrations usually last until midnight, then some continue partying with friends until dawn. In Chile's capital Santiago, thousands of Chileans gather at the Entel Tower to watch the countdown to midnight and a fireworks display, which is televised on major Chilean networks including Canal 13.

There are several fireworks shows across the country, and over one million spectators attend the most popular, the "Año Nuevo en el Mar", in Valparaíso. Since 2000, the sale of fireworks to individuals has been illegal, meaning fireworks can now only be observed at fireworks displays during major events.

As in much of South America, New Year's Eve is spent by Chileans in beach visits in major tourist areas of the nation as it falls in the southern hemisphere summer period.

==== Colombia ====
In Colombia it is a traditional celebration. There are many traditions across the country, including a family dinner with special dishes, fireworks, popular music, wearing special or new clothes, eating empanadas and the giving of parties of various kinds.

==== Ecuador ====
A New Year's Eve tradition in Ecuador is for men to dress in drag, representing the "widows" of the past year. They dance in the streets and ask for a toll from drivers to pass.

There are also traditional family events, meals, and modern celebrations such as hosting parties and going to nightclubs. Ecuadorians usually eat grapes and drink Champagne with close family members and friends.

==== Suriname ====
In Suriname, Surinamese Citizens goes into cities' commercial districts to watch fireworks shows on New Year's Eve. It is a spectacle based on the famous red-firecracker-ribbons. The bigger stores invest in these firecrackers and display them in the streets. Every year the length of them is compared, and high praises are held for the company that has managed to import the largest ribbon. These celebrations start at 10 am and finish the next day. When the night starts, the big street parties are already at full capacity. The parties stop between 10 and 11 pm after which the people go home to light their pagaras (red-firecracker-ribbons) at midnight. After midnight, the parties continue and the streets fill again until daybreak.

==== Uruguay ====
In Uruguay, traditional celebrations begin at nightfall on New Year's Eve (31 December), with family gatherings in which asado and lechon are usually eaten, as well as turrón and pan dulce as desserts. People usually wear white as it symbolizes optimism and purity. At the stroke of midnight, Uruguayans flock to the streets to enjoy fireworks and light firecrackers, and to eat Twelve Grapes.

Due to the fact that Uruguay lies in the Southern Hemisphere, the New Year is celebrated in summer, so resort cities such as Punta del Este are filled with Uruguayans and foreign tourists, including celebrities from the region, to attend parties and festivals of music, fireworks, and light shows on the beach.

In the Old City of Montevideo, a district where a large number of office buildings are concentrated, employees, prior to the end of the last working day of the year, throw torn daybooks and calendars through the windows, causing a "paper rain", which adds to the buckets of water that are thrown from the balconies. In the Mercado del Puerto there is a street party with a massive "cider fight" accompanied by music. Every 30 December since the first half of the 20th century, the Gordo de Fin de Año (Spanish for 'End-of-Year Lottery Jackpot') (Note: El Gordo is simply "the first prize" (Literally translated as "the fat one", or more accurately "the big one")) is drawn, a special lottery draw run by Uruguay's state-owned National Lottery Directorate.

==== Venezuela ====
Radio specials give a countdown and announce the New Year. In Caracas, the bells of the Cathedral of Caracas ring twelve times. During these special programs, is a tradition to broadcast songs about the end of the year. It is a non-working holiday. Popular songs include "Viejo año" ("Old year"), by Gaita group Maracaibo 15, and "Cinco pa' las 12" ("Five minutes before twelve"), which was versioned by several popular singers including Nestor Zavarce, Nancy Ramos and José Luis Rodríguez El Puma. The unofficial hymn for the first minutes of the New Year is "Año Nuevo, Vida Nueva" ("New Year, New Life"), by the band Billo's Caracas Boys. Venezuelans play the national anthem in their houses.

Traditions include wearing yellow underwear, eating Pan de jamón, and 12 grapes with sparkling wine.

Special holiday programs are broadcast on Venezuelan television stations including Venevisión and Venezolana de Televisión, which airs the principal national event from Caracas' Bolivar Square featuring major stars.

== Religious observances ==
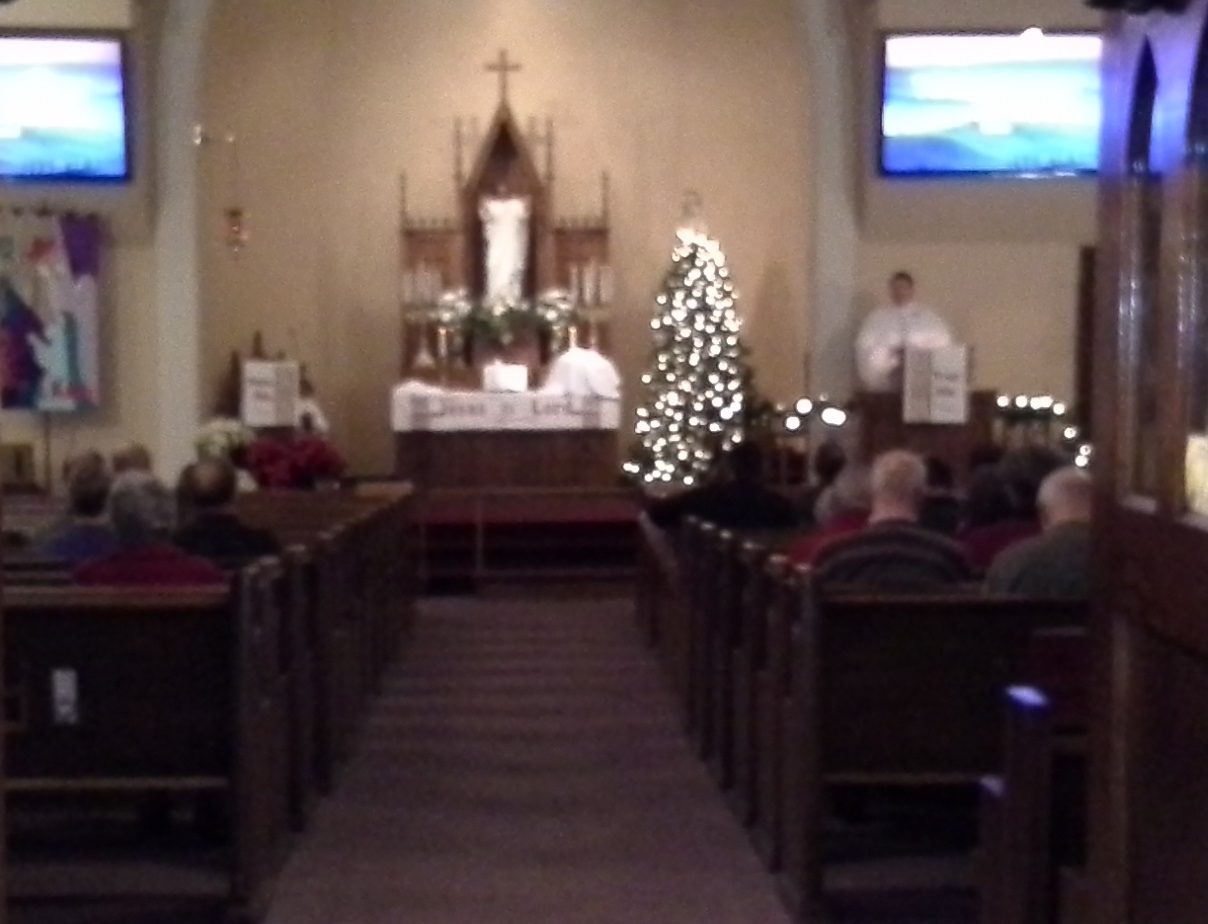
A Watchnight Mass at a Lutheran Christian church on New Year's Eve (2014)

Many Christian congregations have watchnight services on New Year's Eve, which is the seventh day of Christmastide. The Watch Night service (or Watch Night Mass if Holy Communion is celebrated) is part of the tradition of various denominations in Christianity, especially Moravians and Methodists, as well as congregations populated by certain ethnic communities, such as in the Korean community and African American community, in which the faithful congregate in services continuing past midnight, giving thanks for the blessings of the outgoing year and praying for divine favor during the upcoming year. In the English-speaking world, Watch Night services can be traced back to John Wesley, the founder of Methodism, who learned the custom from the Moravian Brethren who came to England in the 1730s. Moravian congregations still observe the Watch Night service on New Year's Eve. Watch Night services took on special significance to African Americans on New Year's Eve 1862, as slaves anticipated the arrival of 1 January 1863, when the Emancipation Proclamation became effective.

With Christianity, in the Roman Catholic Church, Eastern Orthodox Church, Lutheran Churches, and the Anglican Communion, 1 January is observed as the Feast of the Circumcision of Christ, and specifically within Roman Catholicism, as the Solemnity of Mary, Mother of God; it is a Holy Day of Obligation in most countries (Australia being a notable exception), thus the Church requires the attendance of all Catholics in such countries for Mass that day. However a vigil Mass may be held on the evening before a Holy Day; thus it has become customary to also have Mass on the night of New Year's Eve (which are often referred to as Watchnight Masses). New Year's Eve is a feast day honoring Pope Sylvester I in the Roman Catholic calendar (Saint Sylvester's Day). The Catholic Church grants a plenary indulgence, under the usual conditions, to those who recite the Te Deum in public on New Year's Eve, which is usually done prior to the celebration of Mass. In Vatican City, on 31 December, the Pope usually performs a solemn service of Vespers with recitation of the Te Deum in St. Peter's Basilica. After the service, he usually goes out from the basilica into St. Peter's Square to greet the faithful and visit the Nativity scene on the square.

== Music ==
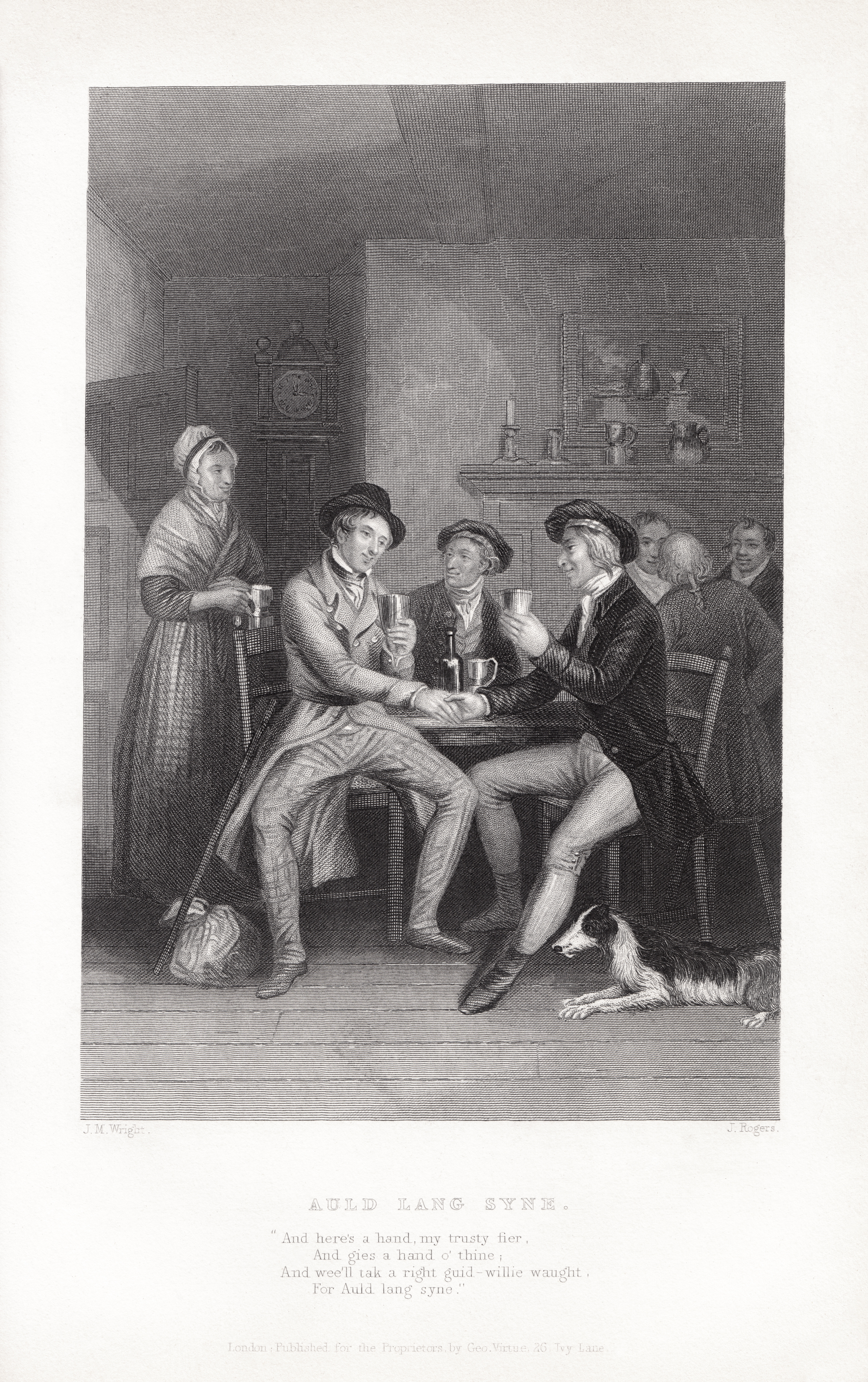
John Masey Wright and John Rogers' c. 1841 illustration of "Auld Lang Syne".

Music associated with New Year's Eve comes in both classical and popular genres, and there is also Christmas music focused on the arrival of a new year during the Christmas and holiday season.

- "Auld Lang Syne", written by Robert Burns
- Johann Sebastian Bach, in the Orgelbüchlein, composed three chorale preludes for the new year: Helft mir Gotts Güte preisen ["Help me to praise God's goodness"] (BWV 613); Das alte Jahr vergangen ist ["The old year has passed"] (BWV 614); and In dir ist freude ["In you is joy"] (BWV 615).
- "The year is gone, beyond recall" is a traditional Christian hymn to give thanks for the new year, dating back to 1713.
- "Happy New Year" by ABBA
- "It's Just Another New Year's Eve" by Barry Manilow
- "Let's Start the New Year Right" by Bing Crosby
- "New Year's Day" by U2
- "Same Old Lang Syne" by Dan Fogelberg
- "Kiss Me at Midnight" by 'N Sync from their 1998 album The Winter Album
- "This Is the New Year" by A Great Big World
- "New Year's Day" by Taylor Swift
- "1999" by Prince
- "Will 2K" by Will Smith
- "Millennium" by Robbie Williams
- "Disco 2000" by Pulp
- "New Year's Day" by Pentatonix
- What Are You Doing New Year's Eve?, written by Frank Loesser

Some European countries welcome the New Year with their national anthem, to wish people of the country a happy new year.

== See also ==
- New Year's food
- List of films set around New Year
- List of objects dropped on New Year's Eve
