= Brasstown, North Carolina =

- Unincorporated community
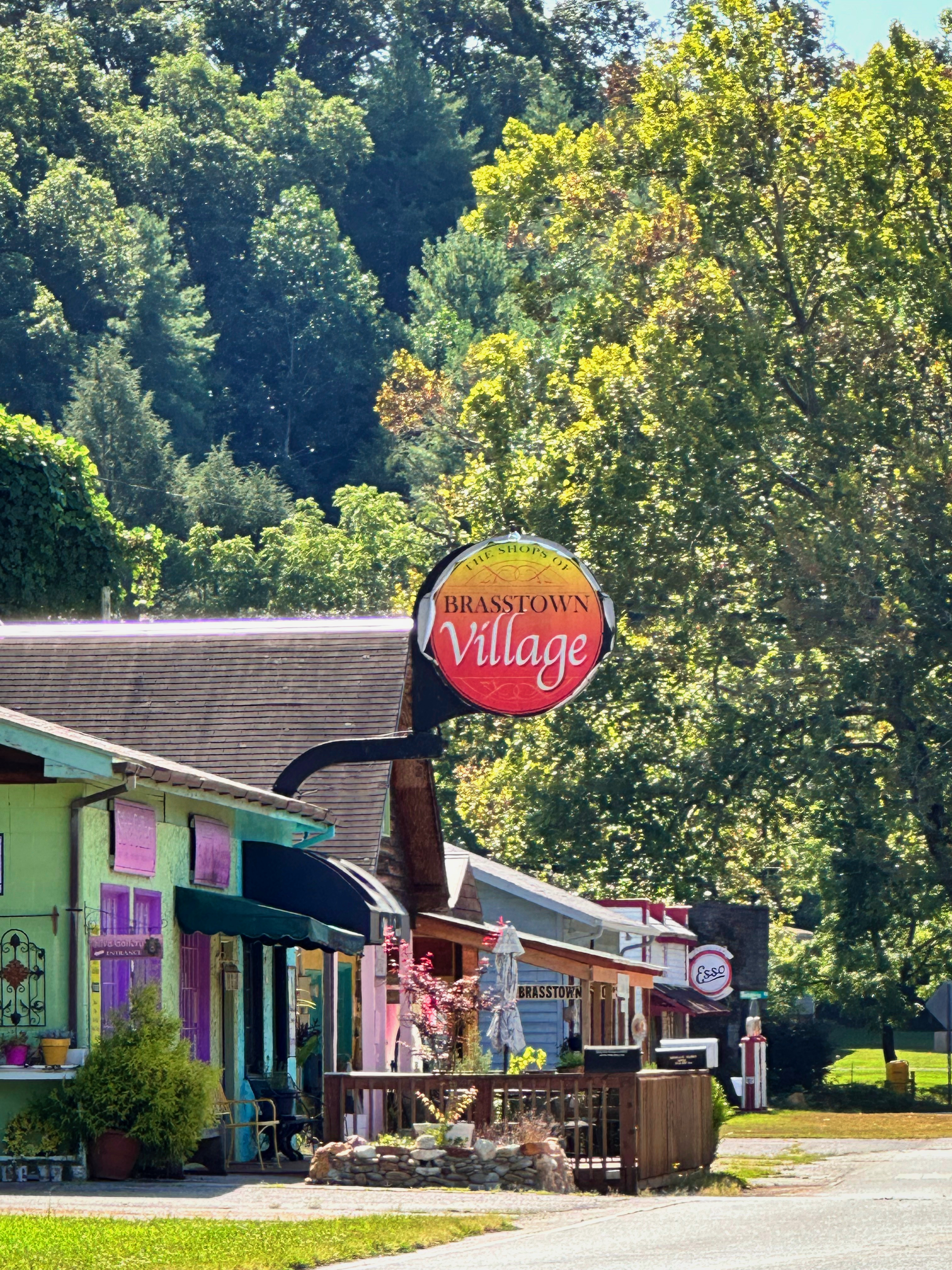
- Downtown Brasstown

- Location within the state of North Carolina
- Coordinates: 35°02′22″N 83°57′25″W
- Country: United States
- State: North Carolina
- County: Clay

Area
  - Total: 12.21 sq mi (31.63 km^{2})
  - Land: 12.17 sq mi (31.52 km^{2})
  - Water: 0.042 sq mi (0.11 km^{2})
- Elevation: 1,736 ft (529 m)
- Time zone: UTC-5 (Eastern (EST))
  - Summer (DST): UTC-4 (EDT)
- ZIP codes: 28902
- Area code: 828
- GNIS feature ID: 1019281

Brasstown is an unincorporated community located mostly within Clay County, North Carolina, United States, though roughly one third of Brasstown is within the adjacent Cherokee County. Brasstown Creek travels through the community and separates the two counties.

== Etymology and history ==
The name, "Brasstown," was given to several historic towns in the Cherokee region, including this one. The name resulted from confusion in translating the Cherokee name, "Itse'yĭ" (meaning 'New Green Place' or 'Place of Fresh Green') with "Ûňtsaiyĭ" (meaning "brass"). (Note: The area surrounding Brasstown Bald in Georgia was also settled by the Cherokee people. English-speaking settlers to the area derived the word Brasstown from a translation error of the Cherokee word for its village place. Settlers confused the Cherokee locative name, Itse'yĭ" (meaning 'New Green Place' or 'Place of Fresh Green'), with Ûňtsaiyĭ (Brass), and referred to the settlement as Brasstown.)

=== Early Settlement and Development ===
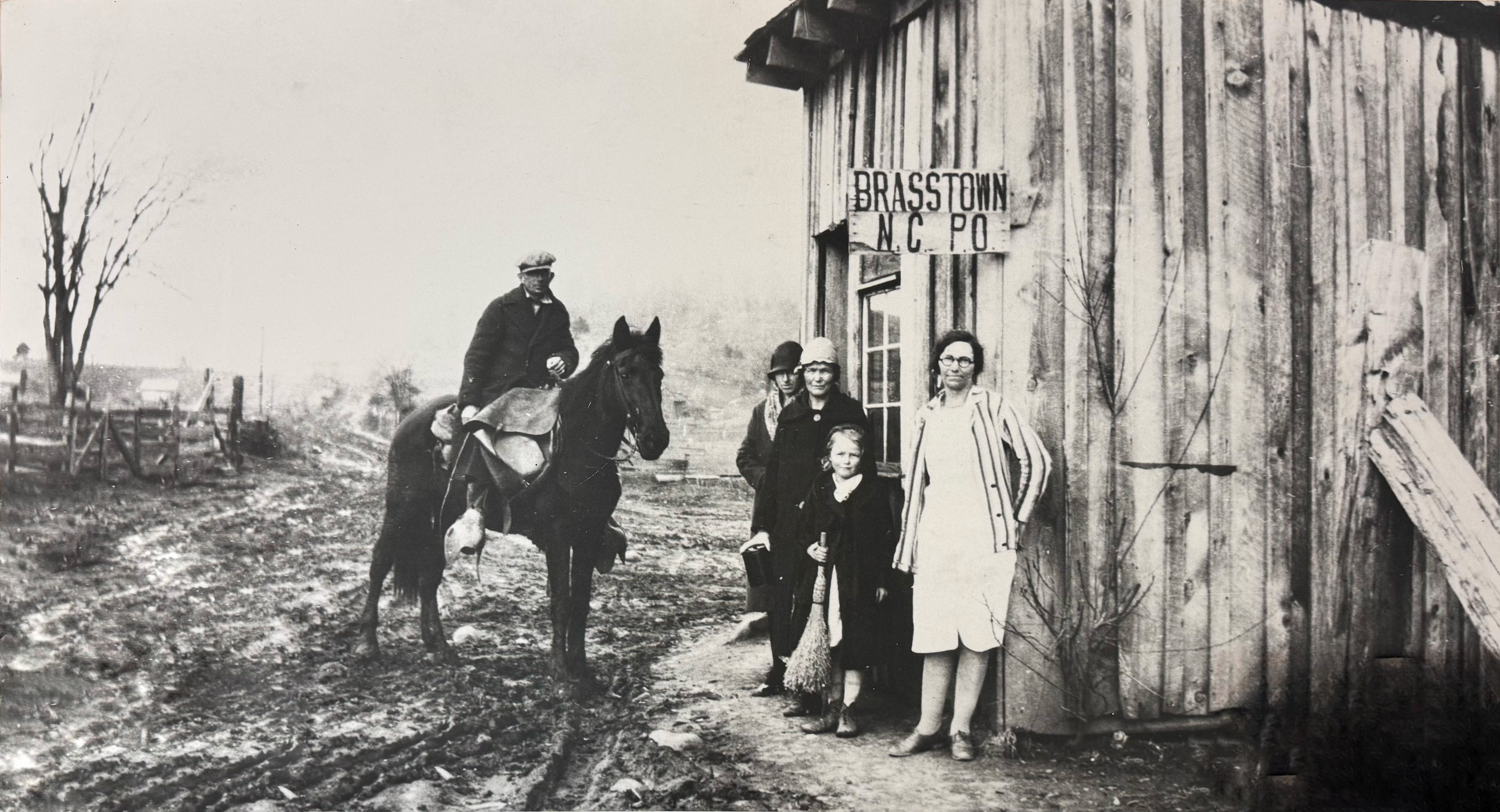
The Brasstown post office in January 1926

Brasstown is the oldest continuous settlement in Clay County. The community was built on the Native American route known as the Unicoi Turnpike. In 1813, when the path was turned into a toll road, a store and inn were built in what would become Brasstown that same year. The community's first white settler was reputedly David Thompson, who ran the inn, which was located near the present community center. Joshua Harshaw's smokehouse, likely built in the 1840s, is the oldest surviving building in western Clay County and may be the oldest structure still in its original location in the entire county. Brasstown's largest church, Little Brasstown Baptist, was founded in 1850. The town's first post office was established in 1871, though it closed and was replaced in 1889.

Brasstown's first school was established in the mid-1880s. It was a log house at Green Cove Church, located at the site of the present-day Hickory Stand Church. Children later attended the five-classroom Ogden School, which opened in 1926 to consolidate small schools in the Warne and Brasstown area. The Ogden School offered up to high school classes and closed in 1975. Today the only public schools for Clay County students are 10 miles (16 km) east in Hayesville. Nonprofit manufacturer Industrial Opportunities, Inc., was founded at Ogden school in 1974 before moving to Andrews. Private school The Learning Center was established at Ogden school in 1987 before moving to Murphy.

Construction on US 64 between Hayesville, Warne, and Brasstown started in 1921. The John C. Campbell Folk School was formed in 1925 and a credit union known as the Brasstown Savings and Loan Association was established in 1926. As late as 1934 Brasstown had its own time zone. At that time Cherokee County operated on Central time and Clay County ran on Eastern time. Due to frequent gatherings at the folk school, Brasstown clocks were set half-way in-between to avoid confusion. When it was 1 p.m. in Murphy and 2 p.m. in Hayesville, it was 1:30 p.m. in Brasstown.

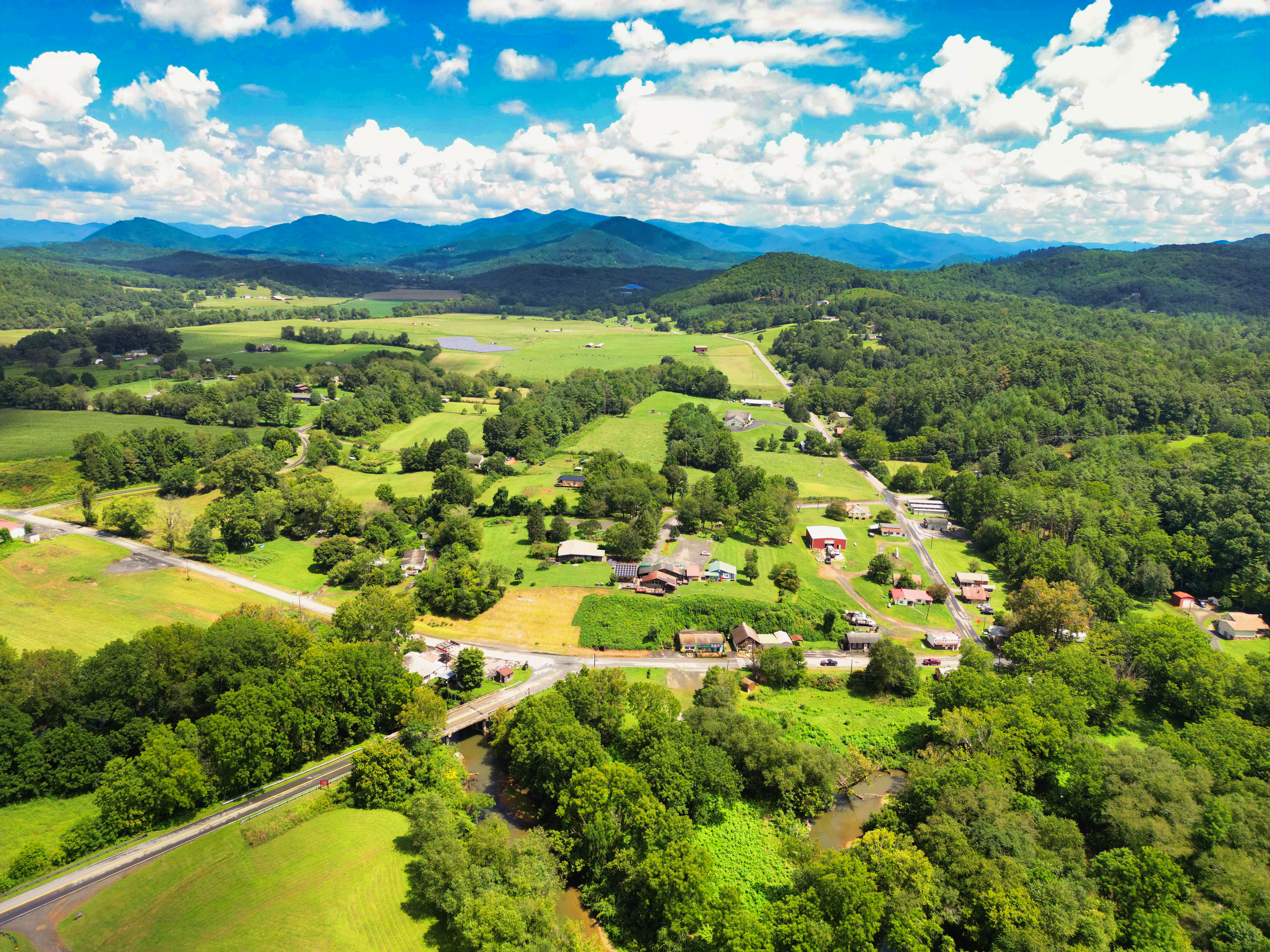
Brasstown in 2022

=== Economic and Infrastructure Growth ===
A creamery opened in Brasstown in 1924 and was operated by the Folk School during the 1930s. It produced butter at first, then ice cream, and by 1937, whole milk. It was equipped to churn 6,000 pounds of butter per week, one-third of which was sold to businesses in Atlanta. The creamery closed in 1974. The building is today occupied by an art gallery. A gold mine operated in Brasstown around the 1930s.

The Tri-County Racetrack, a 1/4-mile banked dirt oval raceway, opened in 1969 and hosts races on weekend evenings. Jack Wimpey built the track on property he owned. NASCAR driver Bill Elloiott gained experience on the track. VIP suites were constructed in 2018. In 2025, the concession stand was remodeled, new restrooms were built, and the pit area quadrupled in size. The Brasstown area experienced two small tornadoes during the 1974 Super Outbreak. Brasstown's volunteer fire department began in 1976. In 2023 the department built and moved into a new headquarters on Old Highway 64 West next to the raceway.

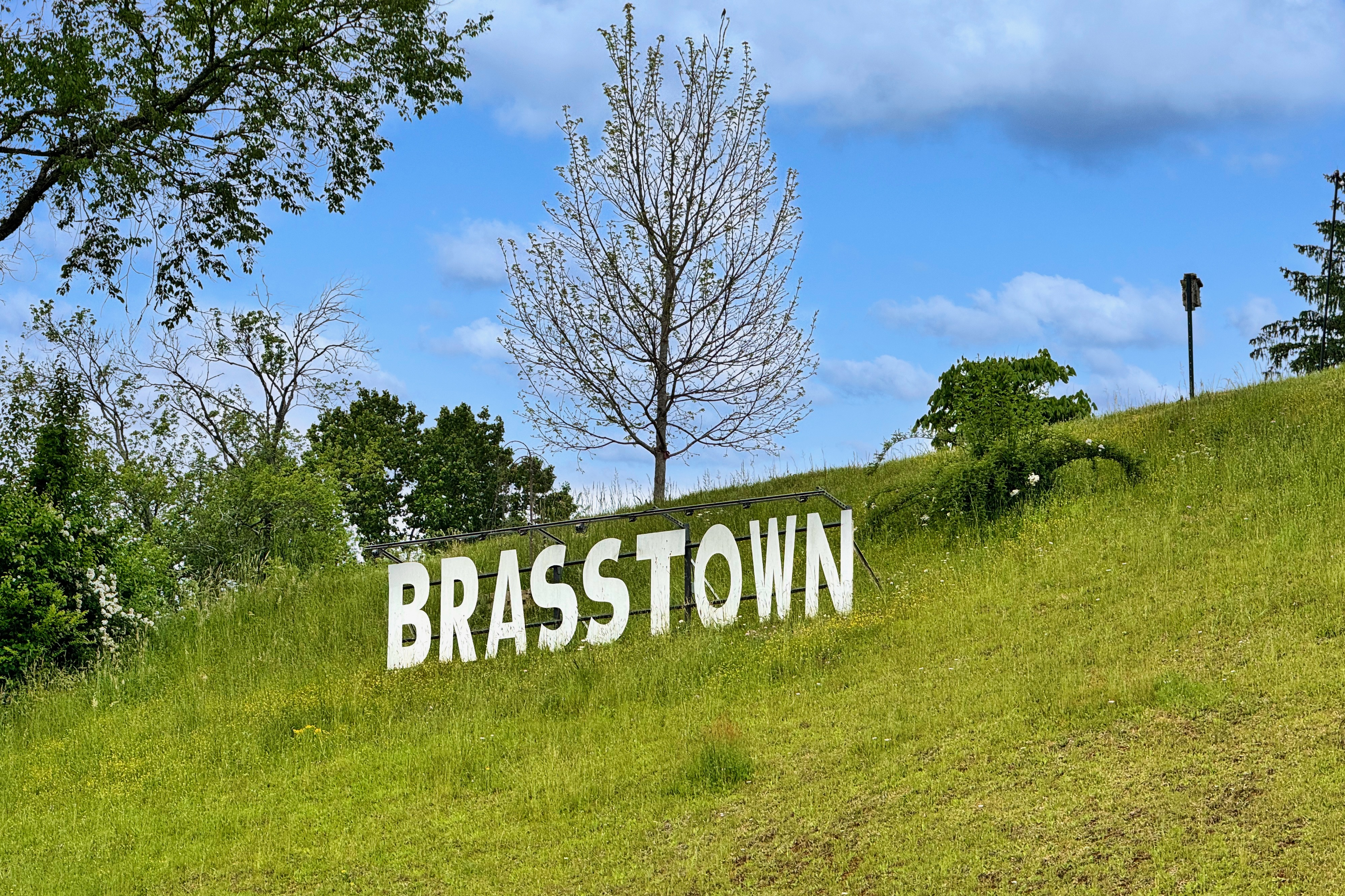
The Brasstown sign across from Clay's Corner

The 6,000-square-foot (560 m^{2}) Brasstown Community Center was built and opened in 1998. It features a commercial kitchen, a gym that can seat 850 people, a fenced playground, and a quarter-mile walking track. It also functions as the town's voting site. Brasstown Airport opened by 2005 on Settawig Road. Little Brasstown Creek Park opened in 2006 on the Folk School campus. The park includes the Rivercane Walk, Cherokee history and artwork exhibits, and multiple nature trails. Brasstown's Hollywood-style hillside sign was erected by 2008. Clay County's two-day Punkin Chunkin Festival, where pumpkins are launched through the air via catapult, has been held on Settawig Road in Brasstown since 2009. Brasstown also hosts the Folk School's annual Fall Festival, which began in 1974 and draws thousands of people to the community. In mid-2026, Peachtree Fire & Rescue took over fire protection and emergency services for the Cherokee County side of Brasstown (which had long been covered by Clay County Fire & Rescue). Peachtree Fire & Rescue built a new station adjacent to the Folk School, improving the area's ISO Fire Protection rating from Class 6 to Class 5.

== Geography ==
Brasstown is located in southwest Clay County and southeast Cherokee County at the confluence of the Hiwassee River and Brasstown Creek. The waterways separate the two counties. In 2026, Tennessee Valley Authority released a map showing that approximately 25 structures in downtown Brasstown would be flooded in the event that Chatuge Dam failed.

== Annual opossum drop ==
The Possum Drop was an annual event at Clay's Corner convenience store organized by Clay and Judy Logan. At midnight on New Year's Eve, instead of dropping an object, a plexiglass box containing a living opossum was lowered from the roof of the store. At midnight the animal was lowered to the ground while a small crowd of local residents sometimes shot fireworks. The opossum was released afterward.

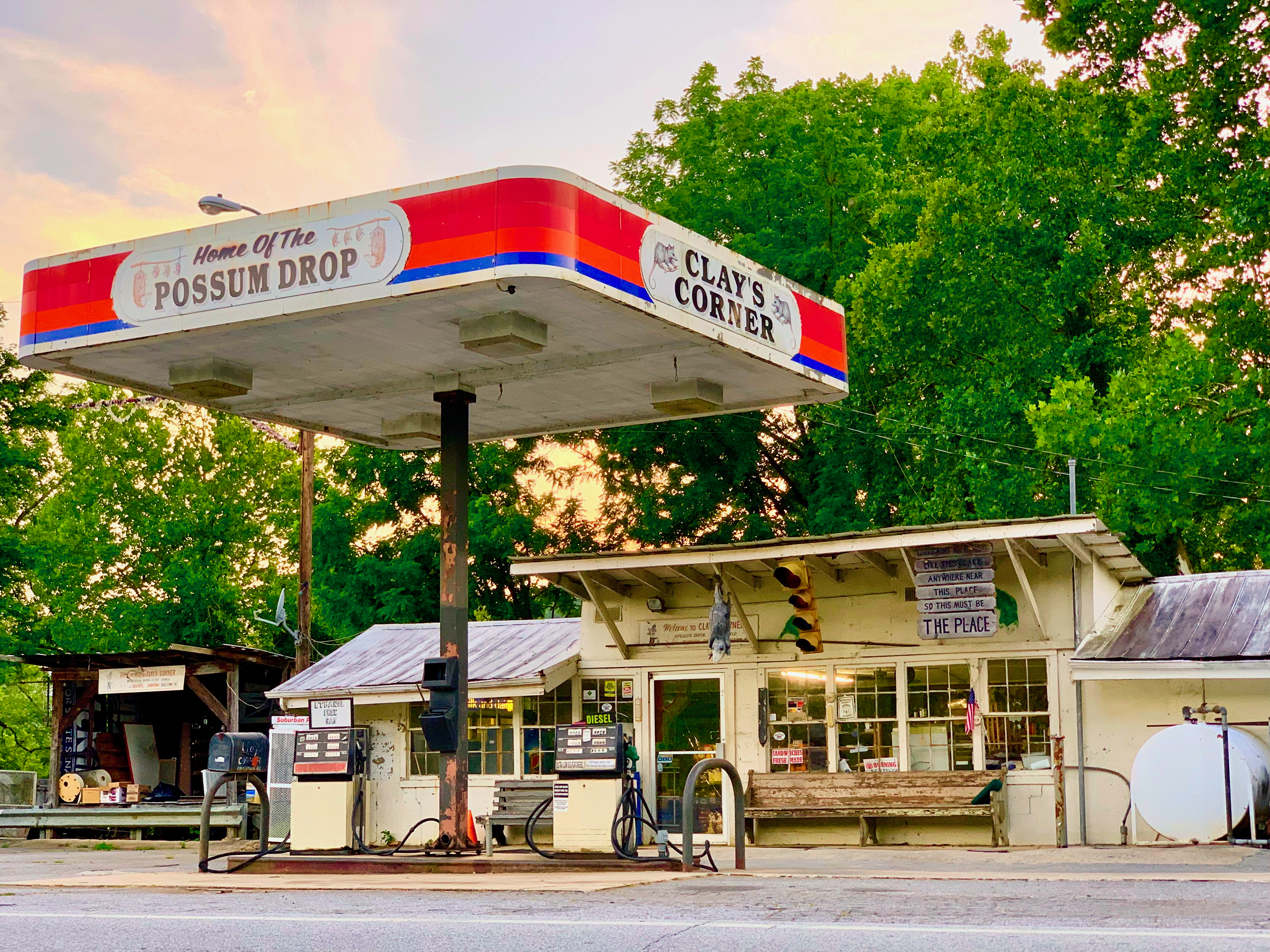
Clay's Corner, home of the Possum Drop

The Possum Drop started in 1990 with twenty people, a covered dish supper, jam music, and a ceramic possum lowered in a fish bowl. The next year Logan used a real opossum that had been trapped for the occasion. The New York Times reported on the event in 2003. Hours before the Dec. 31, 2003, Possum Drop People for the Ethical Treatment of Animals called Logan and threatened to sue if a live opossum was used, so Logan used roadkill instead. The following year, the event resumed using a live opossum. By 2010, the crowd had grown to 2,000 people. The drop was featured on CBS Sunday Morning and PETA threatened to sue again, calling on the N.C. Wildlife Resources Commission to step in. The WRC issued a permit for Logan to use a live opossum anyway.

In 2013, the North Carolina General Assembly passed the “Possum Drop Bill,” allowing the WRC to issue live captivity licenses for events. PETA sued the WRC in response and in September 2013, filed a petition to stop the event from taking place, calling it "cruel." The event moved to nearby Andrews, North Carolina, for 2018-2019 upon Clay and Judy Logan's retirement. However, one of the opossums there was injured and used with a broken leg that was later amputated. After lawsuits by PETA and appeals to state officials by concerned citizens, the town opted not to continue the Possum Drop and it has not been held since.

The 1,700-square-foot building got its start in 1940 as a produce stand owned by the Caldwell family. Clay Logan purchased the Citgo station in 1998. In 2014, Clay Logan was elected to the Clay County Board of Commissioners. Clay's Corner reopened under the management of the Logan Family in 2019. The building was damaged by fire in 2026. Today many locals celebrate New Year's Eve with dance, music, and food at the nearby John C. Campbell Folk School instead. The event inspired the “Possum Drop Song,” which is performed every December in the Brasstown Follies at the Folk School during Winter Dance Week. Brasstown continues to be known as the self-proclaimed "possum capital of the world." In 1992, Brasstown's "honorary mayor" Mercer Scroggs launched a tongue-in-cheek campaign for the U.S. presidency with the Possum Party because it was "middle-of-the-road."

== Education ==
The John C. Campbell Folk School, dedicated to preserving and encouraging the folk arts of the Appalachian Mountains, is located in Brasstown. It was listed on the National Register of Historic Places in 1983. The land for the Folk School was donated by Fred O. Scroggs, who wanted to preserve the folk teachings of mountain culture. Today it is the largest and oldest folk school in the United States with more than 6,000 adult students and 100,000 visitors per year.

== Healthcare ==
Brasstown is served by Erlanger Western Carolina Hospital, a 191-bed facility 2.5 miles (4.0 km) west in nearby Peachtree. Founded in 1979, it is the only hospital in North Carolina west of Franklin and Bryson City.

== Notable people ==
- Olive Dame Campbell – Folklorist and founder of the John C. Campbell Folk School
- Jan Davidson – Folklorist who was the longest serving director of the John C. Campbell Folk School
- Bob Dalsemer – Internationally known square and contra dance writer and caller
- Loyal Jones – Folklorist and writer
