= Happy New Year, America =

- Presented by: Various hosts
- Country of origin: United States
- No. of episodes: 16

Production
- Running time: 120 minutes

Original release
- Network: CBS
- Release: December 31, 1979 – December 31, 1995

Happy New Year, America is an American television special that aired on the CBS television network to celebrate the New Year. It first aired on December 31, 1979 (leading into 1980), and last aired December 31, 1995 (leading into 1996).

== History ==
The show was commissioned to replace Guy Lombardo's New Year specials. Though Lombardo had died in 1977, Guy's brother, Victor Lombardo, and their nephew Bill Lombardo, led the Royal Canadians band for two more New Year specials (1977 and 1978) after that. Happy New Year, America featured coverage of the Times Square Ball in New York City and the party in the ballroom of The Waldorf-Astoria Hotel, both of which were also covered during the Lombardo years. However, the show also featured pre-taped segments from Billy Bob's Texas (as made popular by CBS drama Dallas) and Walt Disney World.

The show had a different host year after year, unlike its competitor New Year's Rockin' Eve (which was annually hosted by Dick Clark). Andy Williams was the most frequent guest host of the show. Other hosts include Paul Anka, who did the first one, Donny Osmond, Natalie Cole, Gladys Knight (1986–87; 1988–89) and Al Jarreau (who substituted for Knight when she was sick in the 1985–86 show), along with Kermit the Frog. Other people who have covered the countdown from Times Square include Catherine Bach (1979–80, 1980–81), Donna Mills, Michelle Lee, Jim Varney (in character as Ernest P. Worrell, 1988–89), Terry Bradshaw (1990–91), Brent Musburger (1986–87)' Christie Brinkley (1987–88), Natalie Cole and Lily Tomlin (in character as "Ernestine the Telephone Lady" 1984–85), having made appearances over the course of the show's run.

In 1991–92, CBS aired the Hard Rock Cafe New Year's Special, with Paul Reiser hosting from the New Orleans Hard Rock Cafe, with live performances by Bonnie Raitt, John Mellencamp, and pre-taped appearances by Sting, INXS, Dire Straits and the Neville Brothers. The special returned the following year, with Jay Thomas hosting from the New York Cafe and Nia Peeples reporting from Times Square. It featured appearances by Keith Richards, Robert Cray, Genesis, Pearl Jam, The B-52s, Bo Diddley, The Kids in the Hall, Judy Tenuta and U2.

The special went on hiatus for 1993–94; CBS instead aired a special edition of its recently-launched late-night talk show Late Show with David Letterman (competing with the traditional New Year's edition of The Tonight Show with Jay Leno on NBC), with guests Tom and Roseanne Arnold, Bon Jovi, and live coverage from Times Square. HNYA returned for 1994–95, this time with Letterman's bandleader Paul Shaffer as host. The following year, Montel Williams hosted what would be the final edition of the special.

=== Cancellation, successors ===
In 1996, Disney ended all outside productions with the other major networks upon their purchase of ABC, and CBS decided to exit live coverage of the holiday at that time. Since then, reruns of The Late Show aired as normal. For 1998–99, CBS aired another New Year's Eve edition of Late Show, with guest Nathan Lane.

For 2000, CBS aired a schedule of special programming, beginning with a prime time edition of Late Show with guest Kevin James and cameo appearances by Dick Clark and New York mayor Rudy Giuliani. This was followed by America's Millennium, a special co-hosted from the Lincoln Memorial by Will Smith and Dan Rather; it featured coverage of Quincy Jones' America's Millennium gala, including appearances by Celine Dion, Trisha Yearwood, and the cast of Stomp among others, and the premiere of The Unfinished Dream—a short film by Steven Spielberg.

On December 31, 2021, CBS reintroduced a national New Year's special with the country music-themed New Year's Eve Live: Nashville's Big Bash; its second edition would add coverage from Times Square co-anchored by WCBS-TV meteorologist Lonnie Quinn.
