= New Year's Eve Live: Nashville's Big Bash =

American TV series

- Directed by: Sandra Restrepo
- Presented by: Rachel Smith
- Country of origin: United States
- No. of episodes: 4

Production
- Executive producers: Robert Deaton, Mary Hilliard Harrington
- Production location: Nashville, Tennessee
- Production company: Music City Inc.

Original release
- Network: CBS
- Release: December 31, 2021 – present

New Year's Eve Live: Nashville's Big Bash is a New Year's Eve television special that has been broadcast by CBS since December 31, 2021. The special features coverage of festivities in Nashville, Tennessee, primarily featuring performances by country musicians from the Bicentennial Capitol Mall State Park among other venues, culminating with Nashville's music note drop at midnight in the Central Time Zone.

Since the 2022–23 edition, the special has also incorporated coverage of the Times Square ball drop in New York City, at midnight in the Eastern Time Zone.

== History ==
CBS had long been associated with Guy Lombardo's annual New Year's Eve specials from the Waldorf Astoria New York on radio and television, featuring his band The Royal Canadians.

Following Guy's death in 1977, amid mounting pressure from Dick Clark's New Year's Rockin' Eve on ABC, and a failed attempt to continue the special with Guy's brother Victor Lombardo, CBS premiered the new special Happy New Year, America in 1979, which ran until 1996. Barring 1998 (where CBS scheduled a special episode of Late Show with David Letterman to compete with the then-traditional New Year's Eve episode of The Tonight Show) and 1999 (where CBS aired America's Millennium—a year 2000 special from Washington, D.C. co-hosted by Will Smith and CBS News chief anchor Dan Rather), CBS had not carried a New Year's Eve special since, and had instead carried reruns of its regular prime time and late-night lineups against its competitors' offerings.

=== Inaugural edition ===
In September 2021, CBS announced that it would introduce a new country music-oriented special from Nashville, Tennessee, New Year's Eve Live: Nashville's Big Bash, on December 31, 2021, in partnership with the Nashville Convention & Visitors Corp. The five-hour special would be broadcast primarily from Bicentennial Capitol Mall State Park and other locations across the city (such as Skydeck on Broadway), with headlining performances by Dan + Shay, Dierks Bentley, Lady A, and the Zac Brown Band among others, and culminating with Nashville's music note drop at midnight in the Central Time Zone. In November 2021, CBS announced that Rachel Smith of Entertainment Tonight and radio personality Bobby Bones would serve as co-hosts.

On December 31, Zac Brown announced that he had contracted COVID-19, and that Zac Brown Band had therefore been dropped from the special. The special had an average audience of 4.8 million viewers in primetime (finishing in second place behind New Year's Rockin' Eve on ABC in the same window), and peaked at 5.51 million viewers near midnight ET. CBS finished in third place overall behind NBC's inaugural Miley's New Year's Eve Party and New Year's Rockin' Eve.

=== Later editions ===
For 2023, Smith was joined as co-hosts by country singers Jimmie Allen and Elle King, and performances by Kelsea Ballerini (with special guest Wynonna Judd), Dierks Bentley, Flo Rida (with Jimmie Allen), Luke Bryan, Sheryl Crow (with guest Ashley McBryde), Little Big Town, Steve Miller (with guests King Calaway), Thomas Rhett (with Riley Green), Darius Rucker, Lainey Wilson, the Zac Brown Band (with The War and Treaty), as well as an hour-long, headlining set by Brooks & Dunn. The special also added segments covering the Times Square ball drop, with Cody Alan of CMT and CBS New York meteorologist Lonnie Quinn as correspondents.

CBS once again finished in third place for the night, down from 2022 with an average of 3.9 million viewers, and peaking at an average of 4.8 million near midnight ET; following the lead of NBC's special the previous year, both Nashville's Big Bash and New Year's Rockin' Eve changed their formats to end their primetime segments at 10:00 p.m. ET/PT, and begin their late-night segments at 10:30 p.m. ET/PT.

Smith and King returned as co-hosts for 2024, which featured performances by Bailey Zimmerman, Blake Shelton, the Brothers Osborne, Carly Pearce, Cody Johnson, Elle King, Grace Bowers, Hardy, Jackson Dean, Jon Pardi, Kane Brown, Lainey Wilson, Lynyrd Skynyrd (commemorating the band's 50th anniversary), Megan Moroney, Morgan Wallen, Old Dominion, Parker McCollum, Trace Adkins, and Trombone Shorty. Benefiting from a lead-in by NFL coverage, CBS averaged 8.31 million viewers during the primetime segment (notably beating the primetime block of New Year's Rockin' Eve by 1.28 million viewers), and 8.12 million during the 11:30 p.m.–12:30 a.m. segment, which were 112% and 51% increases over 2022–23 respectively.

For 2025, Keith Urban replaced King as a co-host, with Urban joined by Kane Brown and Jelly Roll as headliners. CBS's ratings declined for 2025, with 4.9 million viewers in primetime and 6.9 million during the late-night portion. The 2025–26 edition featured Jason Aldean, Dierks Bentley, Brooks & Dunn, Rascal Flatts, Marcus King, Zach Top, Keith Urban, Gretchen Wilson, Lainey Wilson, Dwight Yoakam, and Bailey Zimmerman, as well as guest appearances by the Fisk Jubilee Singers, SiriusXM host Cam "Buzz" Brainard, MMA fighter Kayla Harrison, comedian Dusty Slay, and gospel singer CeCe Winans.
