= List of objects dropped on New Year's Eve =

On New Year's Eve, many localities in the United States and elsewhere mark the beginning of a new year through the raising or lowering of an object. Many of these events are patterned on festivities that have been held at New York City's Times Square since 1908, where a large crystal ball is lowered down a pole atop One Times Square (beginning its descent at 11:59:00 p.m. Eastern Time, and concluding at midnight). In turn, the event was inspired by the time balls used by ship navigators in the 19th century to calibrate their chronometers.

Most drop events are scheduled so that they conclude at midnight in the hosting location's time zone. Some may hold a drop at an earlier time to appeal to families who do not wish to stay up for the later event, with the earlier event being held either alongside, or in lieu of one held at midnight. Occasionally, an earlier countdown may be promoted as celebrating the arrival of midnight in a different location with ties to the city (such as a sister city, or one that shares the same name)

Whilst some of these events use a ball in imitation of Times Square, many "drops" utilize objects that represent an aspect of local culture, geography, or history. Ball drops are by far the most common in, but not exclusive to, the United States.

== List of drops or raises by time zone and location ==
=== UTC+08:00 ===
- Hong Kong: From 1993 to 2015, in imitation of its New York namesake, the Times Square shopping centre "dropped" an apple at its plaza using 22 m (72 ft) of electronic signage.
- Quezon City, Philippines: A star is dropped at Eastwood City.

=== Central European Time (UTC+01:00) ===
==== Spain ====
- Madrid: The time ball on the Reloj de Gobernación—the clock tower of the Royal House of the Post Office at the Puerta del Sol—is activated at midnight.

=== Atlantic Time Zone (UTC-04:00) ===
==== Bermuda ====
- St. George's, Bermuda: A papier-mâché Bermuda onion covered in Christmas lights is dropped.

==== Puerto Rico ====
- San Juan: A lit star is raised. The television special Dick Clark's New Year's Rockin' Eve features an Atlantic Time Zone countdown from Distrito T-Mobile since 2021.

=== Eastern Time Zone (UTC-05:00) ===
==== Delaware ====
- Dewey Beach, Delaware: A skimboarder is dropped.

==== Florida ====
Note: The Florida Panhandle is in the Central Time Zone.

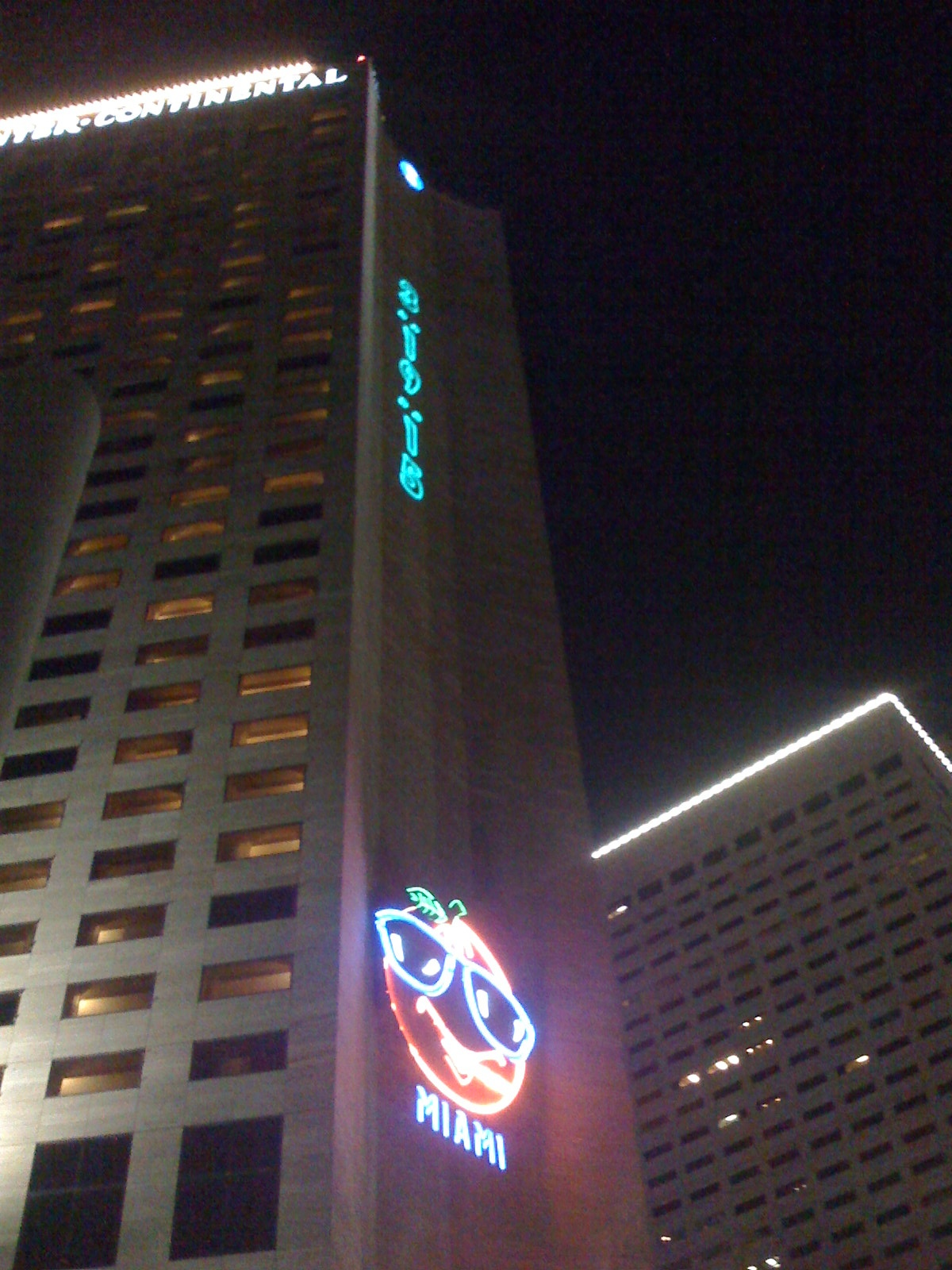
The "Big Orange" at the InterContinental Miami hotel

- Brooksville, Florida: A 200 lb (91 kg) tangerine was dropped during the countdown to midnight until 2009. The tangerine drop was an emblem of the citrus industry that once thrived in Brooksville.
- Fort Lauderdale, Florida: As a symbol of the city's nickname "The Venice of America", an anchor is dropped.
- Key West (Sloppy Joe's Bar): A six-foot queen conch shell is dropped by the local bar Sloppy Joe's.
- Key West (Bourbon Street Pub): The Bourbon Street Pub, a local gay bar, drops a ruby slipper with a drag queen riding inside. The queen also serves as emcee for entertainment during the lead-up to the drop. The role was originally held by local drag performer Gary "Sushi" Marion, who retired from the event in 2023 after 25 editions (albeit leaving open the possibility of returning for the 50th anniversary, if possible). The event has continued with new queens annually, with the bar beginning to host a drag competition in 2025 to determine who will be the host.
- Miami: The "Big Orange"—a 35 ft (11 m) neon sign of a cartoon orange wearing sunglasses—is raised up the side of the InterContinental Miami hotel overlooking Bayfront Park. Due to the COVID-19 pandemic, the drop was cancelled in 2020, and replaced by a digital projection in 2021 and 2022. The physical Big Orange was revived for 2023.
- Orlando: The "Orange Ball" drop was previously hosted on Church Street in Downtown Orlando; in 2024, after Church Street Entertainment discontinued the event, a consortium of local restaurant and bar owners reached an agreement to purchase the ball and continue the event, re-locating it to Thornton Park.
- Sarasota, Florida: A glowing pineapple is dropped at midnight to ring in the new year in southwest Florida.
- Winter Haven, Florida (Legoland): A Lego brick is dropped at 8:00 p.m. Eastern Time.

==== Georgia ====
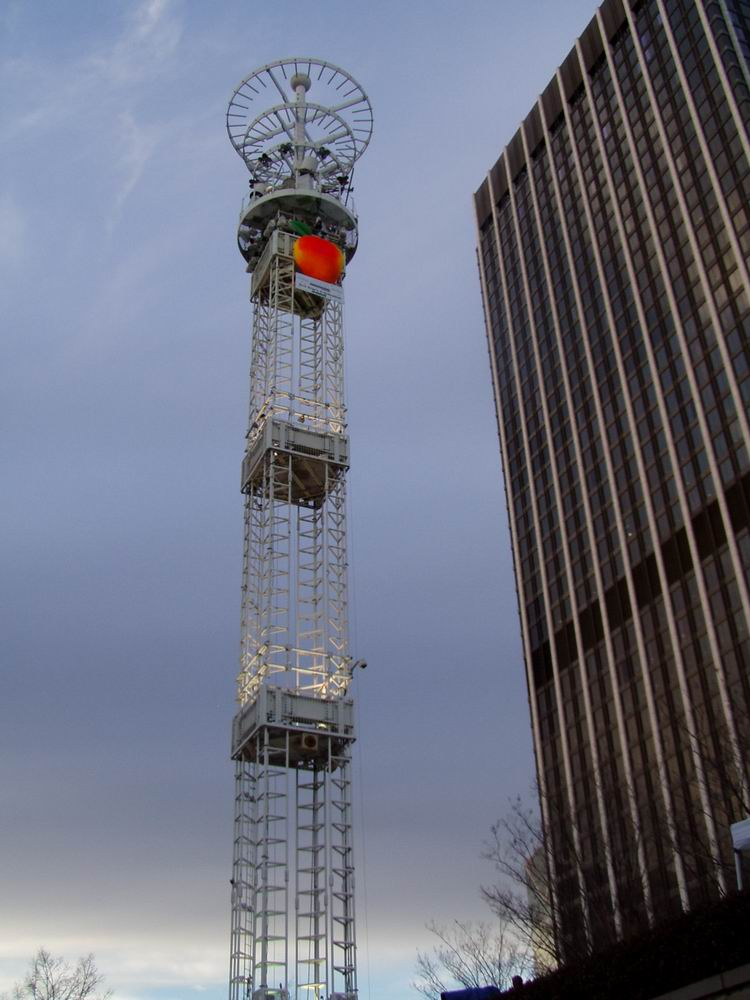
The Peach Drop tower in Atlanta

- Atlanta: A peach was lowered as part of the annual Peach Drop, which had been held at Underground Atlanta from 1989 to 2017 and 2019. For 2018, the event moved to Woodruff Park. The 2020, 2021, and 2022 editions were cancelled due to event improvements and the COVID-19 pandemic; while the event successfully returned for 2023, it was once again cancelled for 2024, with a spokesperson citing Atlanta officials having prioritized its commemorations of the 50th anniversary of hip hop music in 2023, and that the drop has not been an annual event since 2017. The drop was revived again for 2025 with support from Live Nation. The drop was discontinued again in 2026, with the city replacing it with drone and fireworks shows visible over larger portions of the city in order to prevent crowding.
- Brunswick, Georgia: Bob the Shrimp is lowered by the local fire department during the annual shrimp drop, a new tradition starting 2023 at the Mary Ross Waterfront Park.
- Cornelia, Georgia: Cornelia hosts a "Little Red Apple" Drop and Dance in honor of the region's apple growers. The "Big Red Apple" located at the train depot is not dropped.
- Duluth, Georgia: A disco ball called the Soaring Spirit Ball is raised.
- Gainesville, Georgia: The "Chuck the Chicken" Drop started in 2009 to benefit the Humane Society of Northeast Georgia.
- Macon, Georgia: A 6-foot wide lighted ball with metal cherry blossoms and pink lights is dropped in honor of the International Cherry Blossom Festival.
- Marietta, Georgia: For 2016 an aerialist from the Proia Dance Project was lowered from a suspended cube approaching midnight.
- Perry, Georgia: A buzzard is lowered.
- Savannah, Georgia: From 2014 until 2018, the Savannah Riverfront has hosted Up the Cup on River Street, featuring the raising of a to-go cup. Wet Willies bar discontinued this event in 2019.
- Tallapoosa, Georgia: A stuffed opossum named Spencer is lowered.
- Unadilla, Georgia: A pig-shaped sign is lowered in the "Hog Drop".
- Winder, Georgia: A jug drop takes place at the Barrow County Museum.

==== Indiana ====
- Fort Wayne, Indiana: A ball drop debuted in 2016. The original drop was a projection which prompted a group of engineers to volunteer their time in creating a low-poly ball 8 ft. in diameter, covered in translucent acrylic plastic, and lit with over 380,000 lumens of LEDs. As of 2017, the ball was hoisted 80 feet over the corner of Baker and Ewing St., and lowered by crane.
- Indianapolis: An Indy car was dropped from 2015 to 2018.
- Kokomo, Indiana: A 70-pound aluminum ball with 34,000 lights is dropped during The Kokomo Downtown Association New Year's Eve Celebration.
- Muncie, Indiana: A ball is dropped.
- Vincennes, Indiana (near Terre Haute): The giant 18-foot, 500-pound steel-and-foam Watermelon Ball is raised 100 feet in the air during the 60-second countdown at midnight, then the replica releases 11 real locally grown watermelons.

==== Kentucky ====
- Prestonsburg, Kentucky: A star is raised.

==== Maine ====
- Bangor, Maine: A beach ball covered in Christmas lights has been thrown off the top of a local restaurant since 2005.
- Eastport, Maine: Since 2005, a sculpture of a sardine is lowered at the Tides Institute and Museum of Art, in a nod to the area's history in the herring fishing and canning industry. As a nod to New Brunswick, Canada on the other side of Passamaquoddy Bay, a maple leaf is also lowered at 11 p.m. ET to mark midnight Atlantic Time. Both sculptures were created by sculptor Bill Schaefer of East Machias.
- Kennebunk, Maine: A wild blueberry ball has dropped from the town's First Parish Unitarian Universalist Church on Main Street since 2015.
- Machias, Maine: A giant plastic lobster, holding a shovel and blueberries is lowered. It took place at the Machias location of Pat's Pizza during 2016.

==== Maryland ====
- Baltimore:
  - Hampden resident Bob Hosier (one of the participants in the neighborhood's annual "Miracle on 34th Street" tradition of holiday light displays) has hosted a ball drop at his home since 1988; after midnight, Hosier emerges from the house dressed as Baby New Year, greeting and taking photos with the ensuing crowd gathered outside.
  - A sports bar near M&T Bank Stadium hosted a more traditional ball drop for 2016, which was sponsored by radio station WZFT.
- Berlin, Maryland: A ball has been lowered since 2017; from 2018 to 2024, one drop was held at 6:00 p.m. for families (midnight CET in Berlin, Germany), followed by another at midnight. The midnight drop was discontinued for 2025 due to budgetary reasons, as the 6 p.m. drop was more popular.
- Easton, Maryland: A red crab is dropped.
- Frederick, Maryland: In honor of being the birthplace of Francis Scott Key, a lighted key is dropped above Carroll Creek.
- Havre de Grace, Maryland: An illuminated duck has been dropped since 2000.
- Ocean City, Maryland: An illuminated beach ball is dropped.
- Princess Anne, Maryland: A stuffed muskrat in a top hat and bow tie named Marshall P. Muskrat is dropped.
- Hagerstown, Maryland: A giant doughnut is dropped in honor of Krumpe's Do-Nuts, a family-owned bakery that has been in business since 1934.

==== Michigan ====
- Ann Arbor, Michigan: For 2014, a lit hockey puck was "dropped" in honor of the NHL Winter Classic game occurring on New Year's Day at Michigan Stadium.
- Detroit: A sculpture known as the "D Burst" (which was adorned with a giant letter "D", in reference to the city's nickname "the D") was lowered at Campus Martius Park.
- Grand Rapids: A six-foot-diameter steel ball is dropped for the WZZM Ball Drop in Rosa Parks Circle. The ball was built by GLC Metal Fabricators Inc. in Ludington with help from Harsco, covered in LED lights done by Tye's Signs in Scottville. A crane raises the ball 160 feet into the air before lowering it slowly into its position for the countdown.
- Kalamazoo, Michigan: A recyclable ball has been dropped since 2009.
- Ludington, Michigan: A 6' 5" diameter ball lit up with thousands of lights is lowered on a countdown to midnight.
- Marquette, Michigan: A lighted ball is dropped from the Masonic Center along Washington St.
- Negaunee, Michigan: Since 2023, a local Italian restaurant has lowered a large, baked meatball; the drop concludes in a pot of tomato sauce, after which the meatball is sliced and served to guests.
- Royal Oak, Michigan: A ball is dropped at midnight.
- Traverse City, Michigan: A cherry-themed ball is lowered as part of the "CherryT Ball Drop" (the event benefits a different charity annually), in honor of the region's prominent cherry-growing industry.
- Wyandotte, Michigan: A 1,000 pound lit steel ball is dropped at both 9 p.m. and midnight next to The Clock Tower downtown.

==== Minnesota ====
- Saint Paul, Minnesota: In 2023, the Midway Saloon began lowering a giant fishing bobber for the "bobber drop"; the bobber aimed to be certified by Guinness World Records as the world's largest functioning fishing bobber, with a 6-foot diameter. For 2024, a larger bobber with a 7-foot diameter was introduced.

==== New Jersey ====
Location	Description	Image
Hackettstown, New Jersey	Since 2024, a giant M&M is dropped.	
Hammonton, New Jersey	A blueberry was dropped for 2018.	
Passaic	A piñata has been lowered from the 663 Main Ave—the city's tallest building—since 2018.	
Point Pleasant	"The Millennium Mossbunker"—a 10 ft (3.0 m) fish made of wood and mylar—was dropped for the year 2000.	
Seaside Heights	Nicole Polizzi (Snooki) from MTV's Seaside Heights-based reality series Jersey Shore was lowered inside a "hamster ball" in 2011 for the network's New Year's Eve special. While the drop was originally to be held inside MTV's studios at Times Square alongside its more famous counterpart, city officials asked the network not to do so.	

==== New York ====
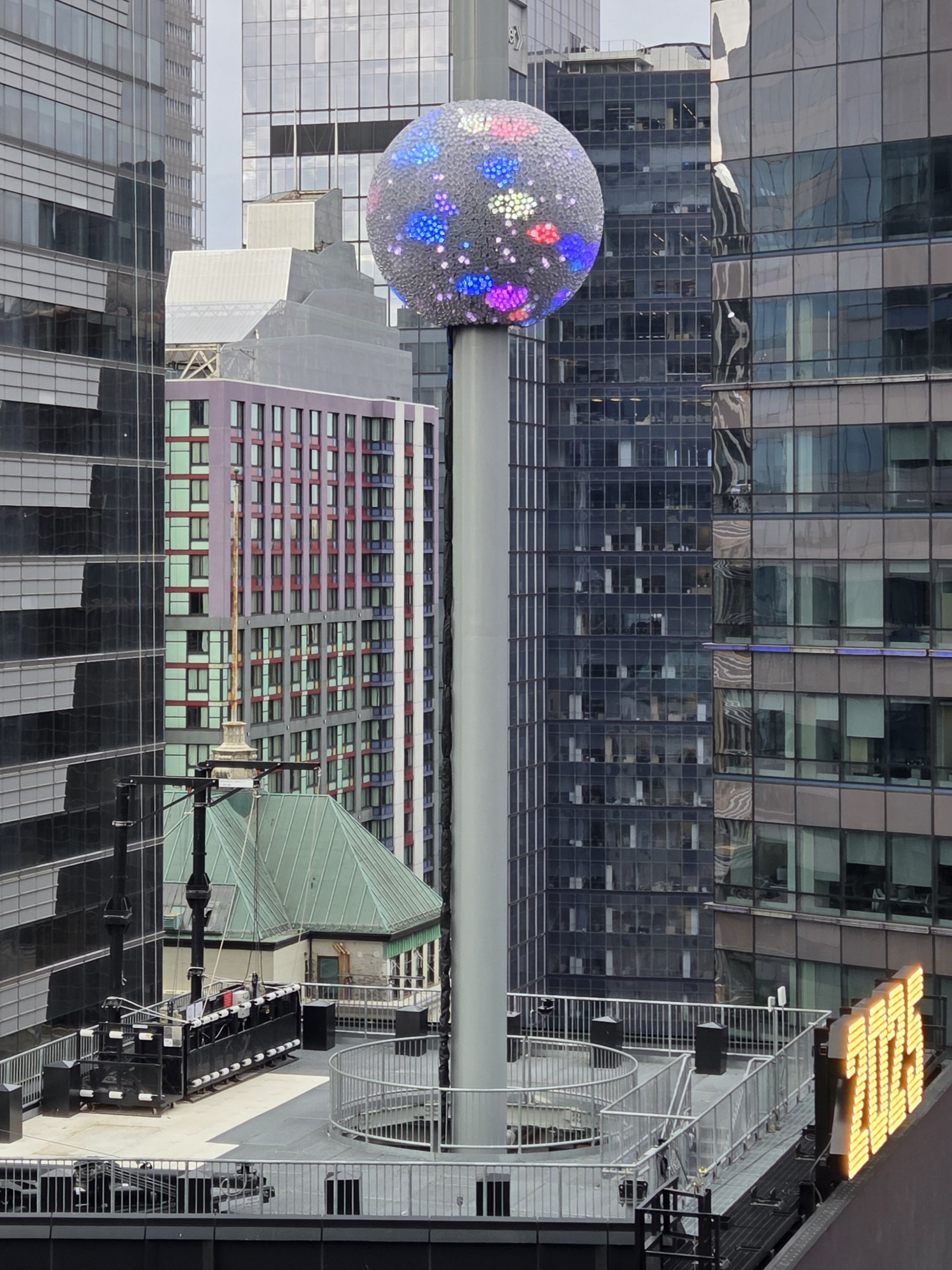
Times Square's ball drop (ball used from 2025– seen here) is the most prominent New Year's celebration in the United States.

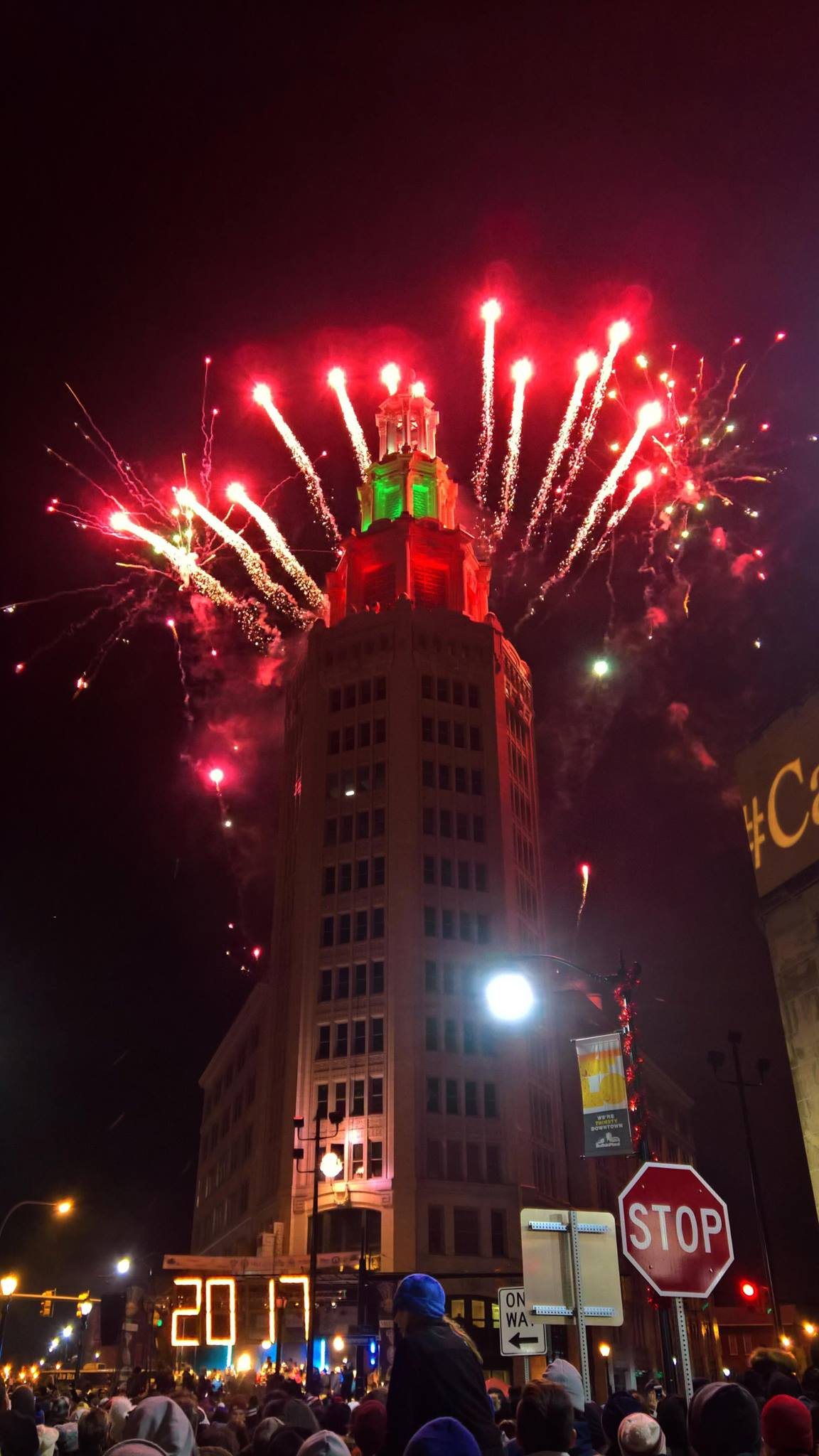
Buffalo's ball drop at the Electric Tower has been promoted as the second-largest New Year's event in the United States, behind Times Square.

New York holds many elaborate drops, particularly the ball drop at Times Square and at the Electric Tower in Buffalo.

- Binghamton, New York: A 6-foot lighted ball is dropped.
- Brocton: A 14-foot-diameter ball is dropped from a height of 165 feet in front of the Saint Stephen's Hotel at the Arches in downtown Brocton. This is reportedly the highest and largest ball drop in the country and the second highest in the world, according to the Dunkirk Observer.
- Buffalo: A ball is lowered from the Electric Tower in Roosevelt Plaza; it has been promoted as the second-largest event of its kind in the United States behind Times Square, with an average attendance of around 40,000. For 2007, as part of a sponsorship by the Ford Motor Company, a Ford Edge SUV was also lowered alongside the ball (promoting that some of the vehicle's components were manufactured locally at Ford's Buffalo Stamping Plant).
- Cheektowaga, New York: A ball is dropped during the day on New Year's Eve to offer an alternative for families.
- Hamburg, New York: A ball is dropped.
- New York City:
  - Times Square: In its most recent iteration since 2025–26, a 12,350 lb (5,600 kg) ball covered in 5,280 Waterford Crystal panels has been lowered from a pole atop One Times Square. The Times Square Ball debuted in 1908 and was originally made of wood and previously metal; during the 1980s, the ball was decorated with red lightbulbs and a "stem" in honor of the city's nickname, "the Big Apple". The ball used to be lit by halogen lamps, but LED has been used since 2008. Since 2009, the ball has remained atop the tower year-round as a tourist attraction. A new design debuted for 2025–26 as part of the renovation of One Times Square. For a period in the 2010s, the ball was also lowered for midnight JST (10:00 a.m. ET) for a press event by then-sponsor Toshiba.
  - The ukulele duo Sonic Uke began holding a ukulele drop in 2004–05, with the event being held at a different New York location annually. The 2011 event was held in Greenwood Heights.
- Niagara Falls, New York: A ten-foot Gibson Guitar is dropped from a specially designed 120-foot scaffold at the Hard Rock Cafe. It draws an anticipated crowd of 15,000 to 20,000.
- North Tonawanda, New York: A ball is dropped as part of "New Year's on the Canal".
- Orchard Park, New York: A ball is dropped.
- Syracuse, New York: An orange ball was dropped for 2013 and 2014; the event was canceled after that and replaced with a midsummer celebration.
- Watertown, New York: A beach ball is dropped at noon New Year's Eve, which kicks off the city's season-long winter celebration, Snowtown USA.
- White Plains, New York: A ball drops from a crane on the corner of Main Street and Renaissance Square in downtown. The urban festival attracts 25,000 residents of Westchester County, New York.
- Wilson, New York: Two balls are dropped, one at 9 p.m. and the other at midnight.

==== North Carolina ====
Location	Description	Image
Beaufort, North Carolina	A pirate is dropped.	
Black Creek, North Carolina	A large red heart drop represents "A Small Town with a Big Heart".	
Brasstown, North Carolina	A plexiglas pyramid containing a living opossum is lowered from the roof of Clay Logan's convenience store for The Possum Drop. The possum is turned loose at the end of the celebration. Despite these measures, the event has been criticised by animal rights activists, particularly PETA, who have a history of objections to the event. The event resumed in 2014. After PETA protests, organizers announced in January 2018 they would be stepping down and retiring from organizing the event, saying that "it's a hard job to do" and "it's time to move on."	
Burgaw, North Carolina	A blueberry drops in reference to the town's annual blueberry festival.	
Eastover, North Carolina	A three-foot tall, thirty-pound wooden flea is dropped.	
Charlotte, North Carolina	A lighted crown is raised, representing Charlotte's nickname as "The Queen City". Charlotte Center City Partners produces the festivities.	
Marion, North Carolina	A five-foot tall illuminated gold nugget is dropped in an event organized by the Marion Rotary Club.	
Morehead City, North Carolina	A "kids' crab pot drop" is lowered at 6:00 p.m. local time during December 31, 2017.	
Mount Olive, North Carolina	The New Year's Eve Pickle is lowered down the Mt. Olive Pickle Company flagpole at 7 p.m. EST, midnight Greenwich Mean Time.	Mt. Olive Pickle Drop
Raleigh	A 900-pound copper-and-steel acorn, designed by sculptor David Benson to celebrate the city's 1992 Bicentennial and Raleigh's nickname, "The City of Oaks", is lowered by a crane. The event has since become one of the busiest New Year's celebrations in the United States with roughly 40,000 attending each year and an attendance record of 80,000 set in 2012.	Raleigh drops its symbol, an acorn.
Raleigh	In years when the Carolina Hurricanes play at home on New Year's Eve, PNC Arena holds its own New Year's Eve "puck drop" inside the arena for fans that attend the game.	

==== Ohio ====
- Chagrin Falls, Ohio: A ball of popcorn is dropped.
- Cincinnati: A flying pig is "flown", not dropped, a reference to "when pigs fly".
- Elmore, Ohio: A sausage is dropped.
- Hamilton, Ohio: A Hollow Earth is dropped.
- Lakeside, Ohio: A doughnut is dropped.
- Marion, Ohio: In the home of the annual Marion Popcorn Festival and the home of the Wyandot Popcorn Company, a giant ball of popcorn is dropped.
- New Carlisle, Ohio: A 7.5-foot, 200-pound aluminum ball is lowered by 90 feet at midnight.
- Parma, Ohio: A giant inflatable pirogi is dropped into a bin of sour cream
- Port Clinton, Ohio: A walleye fish named "Captain Wylie Walleye" is dropped.
- Yellow Springs, Ohio: A ball is dropped.

==== Ontario ====
- Niagara Falls, Ontario: The elevator of the Skylon Tower is raised. The event, and an associated concert, was televised by Global through the 2015 celebration, then by the CBC in 2020. The event drew 65,000 spectators for the 2013 celebration, which was headlined by Dragonette, Hedley, and Nelly Furtado.

==== Pennsylvania ====
- Pennsylvania is the state where the most objects are dropped on New Year's Eve.
- Allentown, Pennsylvania: Allentown's own liberty bell is dropped to commemorate the period when the Liberty Bell was stored in Allentown during the American Revolution.
- Akron: A purple-and-gold shoe is dropped.
- Beavertown, Pennsylvania: A stuffed beaver is dropped.
- Bethlehem, Pennsylvania: A 100-pound, yellow, illuminated Peep made out of fiberglass. (The producer of Peeps, Just Born, is based in Bethlehem.)
- Blain, Pennsylvania: A wooden cow is dropped from a silo.
- Boyertown, Pennsylvania: A bear has been dropped since 2010.
- Bradford, Pennsylvania: A model gazebo has been dropped since 2019; previous to that, a ball had been dropped on an irregular basis.
- Burnham, Pennsylvania: Starting in 2018, a replica railroad wheel was dropped honoring Standard Steel LLC, which has operated for over 200 years.
- Carlisle, Pennsylvania: A Hotchee dog, an iconic local chili cheese dog, is dropped..
- Chambersburg, Pennsylvania: A bag of Martin's Potato Rolls is dropped.
- Cleona, Pennsylvania: A pretzel is raised.
- Cornwall, Pennsylvania: A Cannonball Drop commemorates the historic Cornwall Iron Furnace. The Civil War-era bowling-ball-sized cannonball is courtesy of Sgt. Damian Smith, command historian for the Pennsylvania National Guard.
- Dillsburg, Pennsylvania: Two pickles are dropped; the "Lil' Dill" at 7:00 p.m. ET (midnight in Ireland, in celebration of Dillsburg's Irish founders), and "Mr. Pickle" at midnight.
- Drexel Hill, Pennsylvania: Starting in 2017, a "fire truck" ball will be lowered.
- Duncannon, Pennsylvania: A sled is dropped.
- East Petersburg, Pennsylvania: A large "Haydn's Jug" is dropped.
- Easton, Pennsylvania: A ten-foot Crayola crayon is dropped at 8 p.m. to accommodate children's bedtimes
- Elizabethtown, Pennsylvania: A giant M&M was dropped at midnight UTC to correspond with midnight in sister city Letterkenny in Ireland. This changed to a Dove chocolate bar in 2012–13; both Dove and M&Ms are manufactured in Elizabethtown. The final year was 2013–14.
- Falmouth, Pennsylvania: A stuffed goat is dropped.
- Halifax, Pennsylvania: A Hemlock tree is dropped.
- Hallam, Pennsylvania: A replica of the Haines Shoe House is dropped.
- Harrisburg, Pennsylvania: A strawberry is dropped.
- Hanover, Pennsylvania: A Pac-Man drop has been hosted by a local arcade since 2013.
- Hershey, Pennsylvania: A Hershey Kiss replica is raised.
- Highspire, Pennsylvania: Highspire drops candy in commemoration of the Knights Candy Store that operated there during the 1950s to 1970s.
- Hummelstown, Pennsylvania: A lollipop is dropped.
- Ickesburg, Pennsylvania: A french fry is dropped.'
- Kennett Square, Pennsylvania: For 2014, a steel mushroom was dropped. Kennett Square, often called "The Mushroom Capital of the World", is one of the largest growers of mushrooms.
- Lancaster, Pennsylvania: A red rose is dropped at Clipper Magazine Stadium.

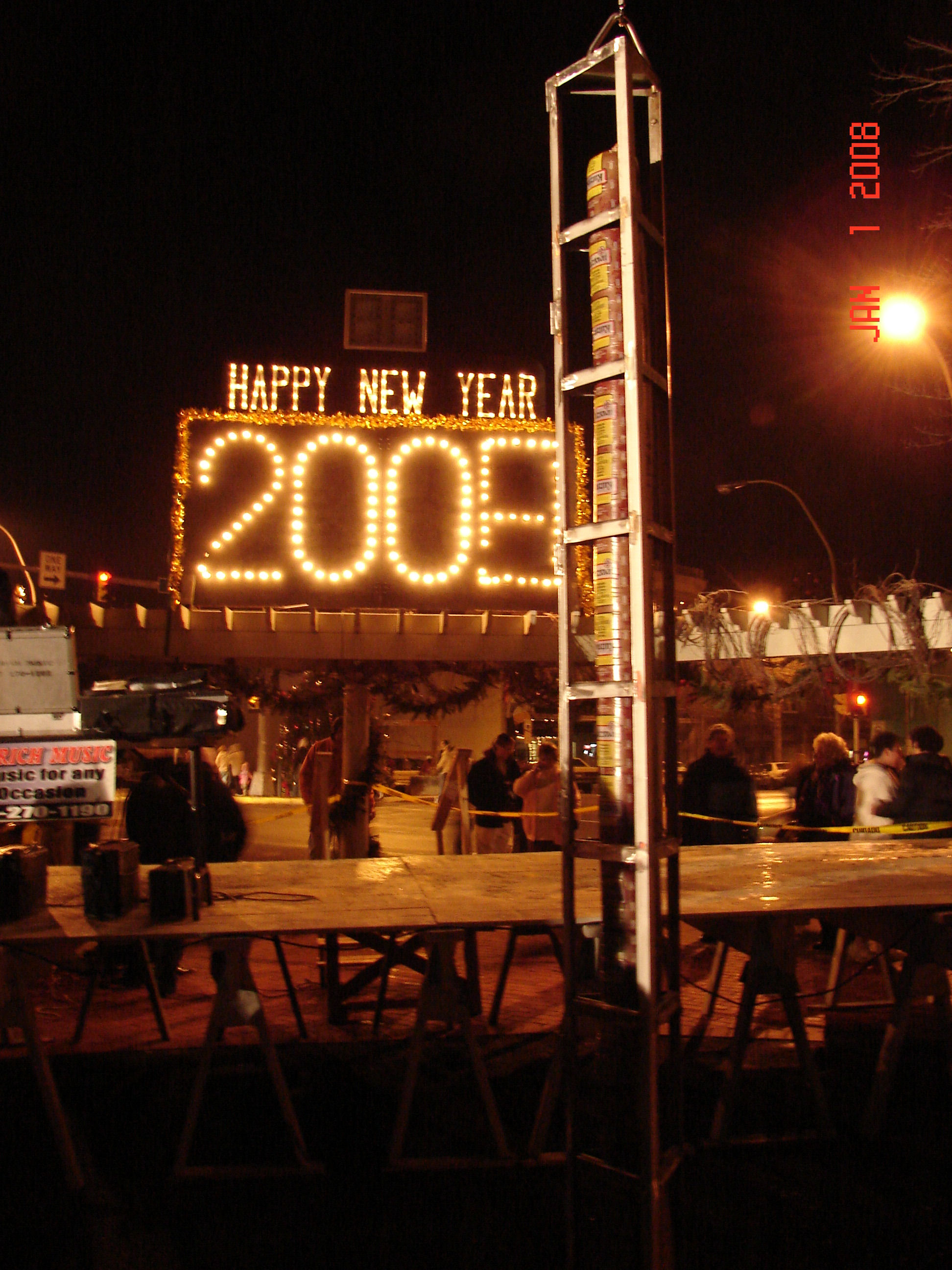
Lebanon's 12-foot, 150-pound New Year's Eve bologna

- Lebanon, Pennsylvania: A 100-pound stick of Lebanon Bologna is dropped. The bologna itself is distributed to a local food bank and animal shelter following the drop. For the 2016–2017 this has been modified to ten 20 sticks.
- Lewistown, Pennsylvania: A bag of Hartley's potato chips is dropped.
- Lisburn, Pennsylvania: A pair of yellow pants or "britches" is dropped in honor of the Yellow Breeches Creek.
- Lititz, Pennsylvania: A Moravian star is raised.
- Liverpool, Pennsylvania: A canal boat is dropped.
- Marysville, Pennsylvania: A replica of the Rockville Bridge that was made by a local Cub Scout Pack is dropped.
- Media, Pennsylvania: A ball is dropped.
- Manheim, Pennsylvania: A ball is raised.
- McClure, Pennsylvania: A kettle is dropped in honor of McClure Bean Soup Festival.
- McVeytown, Pennsylvania: An ice cream cake is dropped.
- Mechanicsburg, Pennsylvania: A wrench is dropped.
- Middletown, Pennsylvania: A metal Rhombicuboctahedron, referred to by the organizers as a "sphoctagon" (portmanteau of sphere and octagon), is dropped.
- Myerstown, Pennsylvania: A tablet of Bayer aspirin has been dropped since 2013–14; Bayer operates a manufacturing plant in Myerstown.
- New Bloomfield, Pennsylvania: A box huckleberry is dropped.
- Newville, Pennsylvania: A big spring is dropped.
- Palmyra, Pennsylvania: "The Giant Shoe" is dropped.
- Parkesburg, PA: A duck is dropped.
- Pittsburgh: A ball representing the planet earth, made of recycled materials, was raised for 2007.
- Plains Township, Pennsylvania: As of 2022, for 2023, a replica brick is dropped.
- Port Royal, Pennsylvania: A sprint car is dropped.
- Pottsville, Pennsylvania: A bottle of Yuengling beer is raised.
- Reamstown, Pennsylvania: "Wobbly Bob" on a beer barrel is dropped.
- Red Lion, Pennsylvania: A wooden cigar held by a lion is raised.
- Richland, Pennsylvania: A cigar is dropped.
- Shamokin, Pennsylvania: A chunk of coal is dropped, turning into a diamond at the bottom; the event has been held since 1987–88.
- Shenandoah, Pennsylvania: A giant pierogi with kielbasi was dropped at 7:00 p.m., in 2017.
- Shippensburg, Pennsylvania: An anchor is dropped.
- Strasburg, Pennsylvania: Ping pong balls are dropped.
- Sunbury, Pennsylvania: An incandescent lamp is lit as an homage to the Hotel Edison and its namesake, Thomas Edison.
- Tamaqua, Pennsylvania: A group of eagles are raised at The ABC Tamaqua Hi-Rise.
- Wilkes-Barre, Pennsylvania: A chunk of coal is dropped, turning into a diamond at the bottom. The Wilkes-Barre celebration, which began in 1995–96, is an homage to the one in Shamokin.
- Womelsdorf, Pennsylvania: A cigar is dropped, an event that began in 2012.
- York, Pennsylvania: A white rose is dropped at midnight after a children's countdown from 6 to 8 p.m.

==== South Carolina ====
- Hilton Head Island, South Carolina: A giant, lighted golf ball is lowered from the Harbour Town Lighthouse, in honor of the Sea Pines Resort's golf courses (which include Harbour Town Golf Links, host of the PGA Tour's RBC Heritage tournament).
- Folly Beach, South Carolina: A giant pair of flip-flops are dropped at the end of Center Street, which draws a crowd. It was started in 2010-11.

==== Tennessee (Eastern) ====
- Gatlinburg, Tennessee: A ball is dropped.
- Knoxville: A ball is dropped on Market Square.
- Oak Ridge, Tennessee: An atom-shaped ball is dropped, as Oak Ridge is known as the Atomic City

==== Virginia ====
- Richmond, Virginia: From 2006 to 2012, a ball was raised at the Byrd Theater in Carytown.
- Roanoke, Virginia: A 10-foot illuminated star is dropped.
- Charlottesville, Virginia: A ball is dropped.
- Fredericksburg, Virginia: An illuminated Pineapple is dropped.
- South Hill, Virginia A 6-foot tall illuminated Star is dropped from 80-foot tall flag pole in the center of town at the Farmer's Market Square.
- Chincoteague, Virginia: The Pony Island Horseshoe Drop, on the Downtown Waterfront Park in Chincoteague, Virginia.

==== West Virginia ====
- Bluefield, West Virginia: an illuminated lemon sculpture is dropped. This references the town's nickname "Nature's Air Conditioned City" and its tradition of giving out free lemonade when temperatures reach 90 degrees Fahrenheit.
- Welch, West Virginia: Welch holds the Coal Drop, when a large imitation piece of coal is dropped.

=== Central Time Zone (UTC-06:00) ===
==== Alabama ====
- Mobile, Alabama: A 600-pound, lit Moon Pie is lowered from the RSA Tower in the "MoonPie Over Mobile" festivities. The event was spearheaded by Mobile councilman Fred Richardson, and first held in 2008. The festivities also include a Mardi Gras-styled parade, as Moon Pies are a traditional throw at Mardi Gras events in Mobile.
- Fairhope, Alabama: A ball is dropped. The event was cancelled in 2010, but resumed in time to ring in 2011.
- Wetumpka, Alabama: A meteorite is dropped in honor of the Wetumpka crater.
- Dothan, Alabama: A peanut drop was held for 2017, honoring the city's title of "The Peanut Capital of the World"; the balloon-based design used for the peanut attracted viral attention due to its unintentionally-phallic shape.
- Samson, Alabama: In 2022–23, the city introduced a drop using a tin of snuff tobacco. The drop alludes to the city's nickname of "Snuff City", stemming from an incident where a train containing a shipment of Rooster-brand snuff was parked at the town's depot for an extended period of time.

==== Arkansas ====
- Fayetteville, Arkansas: A hog is dropped.
- Fort Smith, Arkansas: KISR sponsors a ball drop.

==== Florida Panhandle ====
- Destin, Florida: A ball is pulled over Destin Harbor.
- Fort Walton Beach, Florida: A ball is dropped.
- Panama City, Florida: An illuminated, 800-pound beach ball descends from a tower 12 stories high at midnight. At 8:30 p.m. there is a fireworks celebration and a "family ball drop" with 7,000 beach balls.
- Pensacola, Florida: A pelican is dropped.

==== Illinois ====
- Chicago: A star was (formerly) raised.
- Des Plaines, Illinois: A diamond is dropped.
- Rockford, Illinois: A ball is lowered towards the Discovery Center building.

==== Indiana (Northwest & Southwest) ====
- Tell City, Indiana: An apple with an arrow through it (symbolizing Tell City's namesake, William Tell) is dropped at City Hall Park.
- Whiting, Indiana: Since 2016, a 10-foot Illuminated pierogi has been lowered in an event sponsored by the local Knights of Columbus chapter (the city holds an annual festival known as Pierogi Fest).

==== Kansas ====
- Manhattan, Kansas: "The Little Apple", an apple-shaped aluminum ball, is lowered. The drop has most recently been held outside Kite's Bar & Grill.

==== Louisiana ====
- New Orleans: A fleur-de-lis is lowered at Jackson Square. Until 2008, a gumbo pot was dropped. From 2017 to 2023, the television special Dick Clark's New Year's Rockin' Eve televised the drop and concert acts from the city as part of a Central Time segment of the special.

==== Mississippi ====
- Bay St. Louis: An oyster is dropped in front of a local restaurant.
- Columbus: An illuminated 10-foot-wide-by-10-foot-tall lit aluminum ball is hoisted over College Street 100 feet high as part of the "Having a Ball Downtown Block Party". Festivities were broadcast live on WCBI until 2012.
- Hattiesburg: A replica of the original "Hub-Sign" is lowered in Hattiesburg's historic downtown district. The original four-story "Hub-Sign" stood atop a downtown building for 35 years (1912 – c. 1947) and served as a symbol of Hattiesburg's heritage as the hub of the Gulf-South.
- Jackson: As of December 31, 2022, Jackson drops a magnolia.

==== Missouri ====
- Kansas City: Michael "The Doughboy" Maslak, the longest-tenured improviser at the ComedyCity improv theater, is draped in lights and dropped by members of the troupe.

==== Oklahoma ====
- Bartlesville, Oklahoma: An olive is dropped.
- Oklahoma City: A ball raising was formerly held as part of Arts Council OKC's annual "Opening Night". The event itself was discontinued after 2023.
- Tulsa: The Tulsa Ball Drop, held annually in Brookside, a district famous for its nightlife, features live music, performances, and a street party.

==== Tennessee (Central and Western) ====
- Memphis: A mirrored ball is raised since 2020; previous to that, a guitar was dropped at the Hard Rock Cafe.
- Nashville: An 80-foot Guitar Drop took place at Nashville's Hard Rock Cafe during Music City's Bash On Broadway. In 2011. the partnership ended with Hard Rock Cafe and the guitar was replaced by a 15-foot-tall music note. Since 2021–22, CBS has televised the event as part of a larger special, New Year's Eve Live: Nashville's Big Bash.

==== Texas ====
- Austin: Families in the Austin Woods neighborhood traditionally celebrate the new year with large illuminated new year's balls hung from trees, which are lowered at varying times during New Year's Eve. Downtown, a Lone Star was dropped until 2006, then replaced with a simple mirrored ball.
- Houston: A star representing the Lone Star State was raised at midnight. No celebration was held in 2019. There is also a Noon Ball Drop at the Children's Museum of Houston for families to celebrate "New Year's Noon".
- McAllen, Texas: A giant mirrored ball descends just before midnight. The first orb for 2008 was six feet in diameter, but in 2009 McAllen's big bash was expanded to include a bigger crowd (10,000 attended), a bigger party space and the bigger "Texas-sized" ball used until 2014. This event was last staged in 2014–15 and the event was axed in 2015 due to budgetary problems. An attempt was made to resurrect the event for 2017–18, but failed because of a lack of permit.
- San Antonio: The elevator on the Tower of the Americas was raised until 2013.

==== Wisconsin ====
- Plymouth, Wisconsin: Plymouth drops an 80-pound decorated cheese wedge, the newest Wisconsin cheese, from a 100 ft. ladder truck in a tribute to the region's dairy industry and dairy products. The Plymouth Arts Center hosts the annual "Build Your Own New Year's Party" next to the Creamery Building's parking lot where "The Big Cheese Drop" takes place.
- Prairie du Chien, Wisconsin: A carp (real but dead) caught by local fishers and weighing between 25 and 30 pounds is lowered. A carp was chosen to represent the area's fishing industry and because the carp is considered one of the luckiest fish in Chinese culture. The carp, nicknamed "Lucky", is lowered onto a throne. Each "Lucky" has a tree planted where it is buried with a commemorative plaque listing the carp's name and year.
- Sister Bay, Wisconsin: A cherry-shaped ball is lowered at midnight.

=== Mountain Time Zone (UTC-07:00) ===
==== Arizona ====
The deuce of clubs is dropped in Show Low, Arizona.

- Flagstaff, Arizona: A glowing pine cone is dropped from the balcony of Weatherford hotel.
- Tempe, Arizona: An illuminated sunburst was dropped while the Fiesta Bowl Block Party and Parade was sponsored by Sunkist, but replaced by a tortilla chip when Tostitos became the sponsor of the bowl. The party is 10 blocks long and four blocks wide, with two fireworks shows (10 p.m. and midnight).
- Show Low, Arizona: A deuce of clubs (2♣) debuted in 2011–12. The card, which is the namesake of the main road through Show Low, is, according to legend, the origin of the town's name (the town's founders allegedly derived the name "show low" from a game of poker where the winner showed a 2♣, the lowest card in the deck).
- Tucson, Arizona: Starting in 2014, a large replica taco was dropped from the roof of the Hotel Congress
- Prescott, Arizona: A boot has been dropped since 2010–11; the drop is held at both 10 p.m. and midnight for the Eastern and Mountain time zones respectively.
- Yuma, Arizona: In 2018, the city introduced the "Iceberg Drop", lowering a giant, illuminated lettuce. The drop is held at both 10 p.m. and midnight for the Eastern and Mountain time zones respectively.

==== Idaho ====
- Boise: Since 2013, a giant potato was dropped from the US Bank building in downtown Boise. For 2016, the drop moved to the Idaho State Capitol building, and the organizers successfully crowdfunded a new "Glowtato" with internal lighting. KTVB televises the festivities most years.
- Emmett, Idaho: Since 2016, a cherry has been raised.
- Rupert, Idaho: A sugar beet named Crystal has been dropped since 2019.
- Twin Falls, Idaho: Since 2002, a metal ball, bought at auction for $14 by Dave Woodhead, owner of the former bar Woody's, has been dropped from a pair of grain elevators. The low-budget event attracted a cult following: later editions also switched from a manual pulley to using a 1961 Ford Econoline truck to lower the ball. Following the lease of the bar to new owners, the event was placed on hiatus for 2014, but returned for 2015 in partnership with the new owners. Woodhead acknowledged the drop's inclusion on lists of New Year's Eve drops on Mental Floss and Wikipedia as a sign of notoriety for the event.

==== New Mexico ====
- Las Cruces, New Mexico: A 19-foot illuminated chrome chili pepper is dropped.
- Santa Fe, New Mexico: Since 2015, the Zia solar symbol has been raised 60 feet into the air over Santa Fe Plaza. Sponsored by the City of Santa Fe, the Kiwanis Club of Santa Fe, and other local organizations and businesses, the raising of the Zia is accompanied by live music, food and drinks, fireworks, and bonfires.

==== Wyoming ====
- Cheyenne, Wyoming: Drops a ball at midnight.

=== Pacific Time Zone (UTC-08:00) ===
==== California ====
- Orange County, California: An orange is dropped at Disneyland.
- Redlands, California: An orange is dropped in downtown.
- Sacramento: A diamond-shaped ball was dropped in 2009, but this was discontinued in 2010. A proposal to revive the ball drop for 2013 was rejected.
- South Lake Tahoe, California: A gondola is lowered at 9 p.m. PT (midnight ET).
- Temecula, California: A bunch of grapes is dropped.

==== Nevada ====
- In 2020, The Strat in Las Vegas dropped a contest winner in a lighted suit (the "Midnight Mirror Ball") from its SkyJump Las Vegas ride at midnight to welcome 2021. The cancellation of the America's Party fireworks across the Las Vegas Strip due to the COVID-19 pandemic allowed the normally-closed tower to remain open for the event.

==== Oregon ====
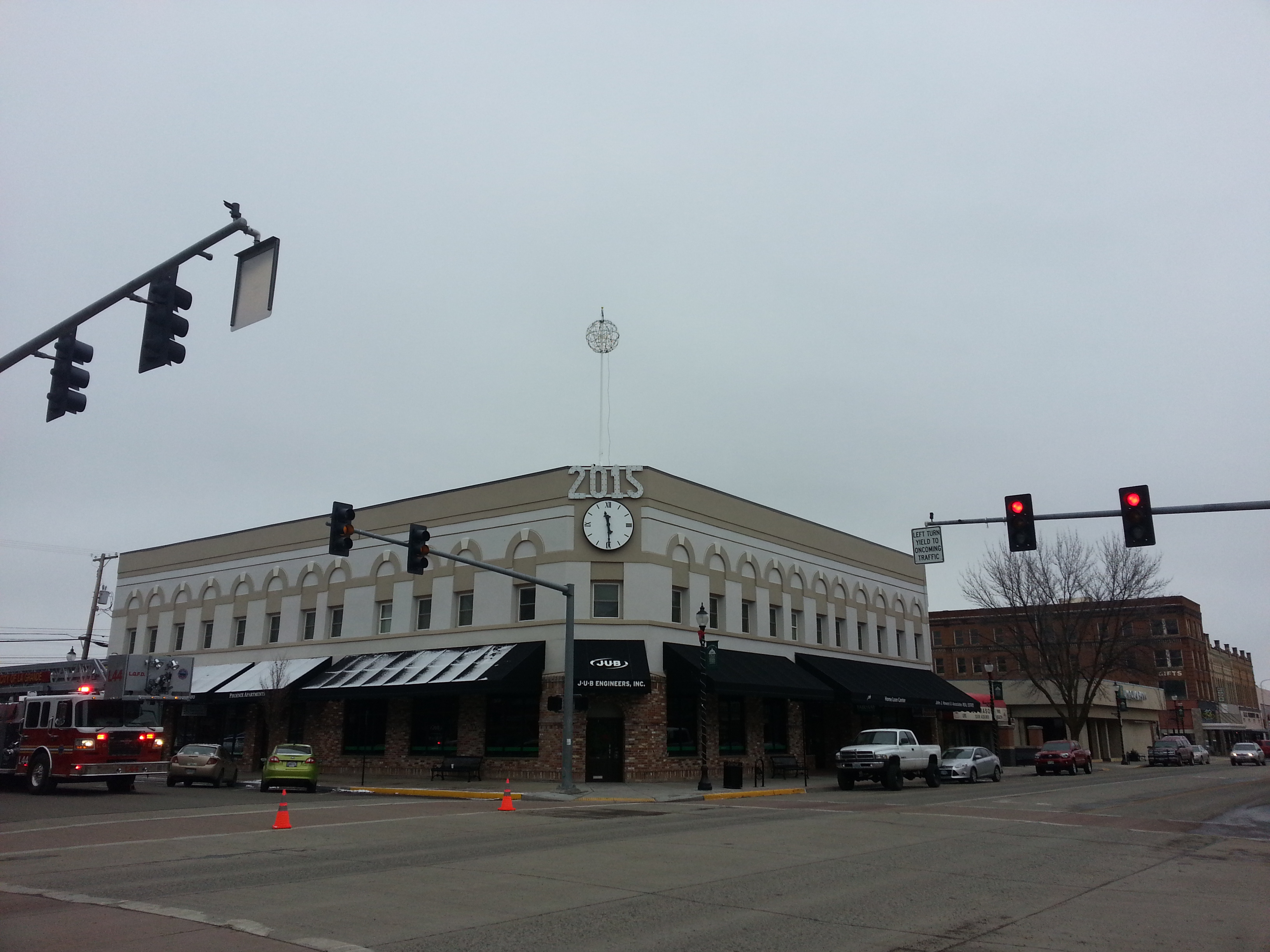
Setting up for the first ball drop in La Grande, Oregon, Dec. 27, 2014

- La Grande, Oregon: Since 2015, a ball has been lowered atop the John Howard Building in downtown La Grande, accompanied by a larger block party.
- Milwaukie, Oregon: Since 2023, the city has lowered an illuminated bing cherry at 9 p.m. PT (midnight ET), in honor of the city being where the fruit was first cultivated.

==== Washington ====
- Seattle: The elevator of the Space Needle is raised and is televised on KING 5.
- Toledo, Washington: A giant cheese ball is dropped.

== See also ==
- List of Christmas parades
- First Night
