= Miracle on 34th Street (Baltimore) =

Holiday lights displays in Hampden, Baltimore

Coordinates: 39.3290°N 76.6280°W

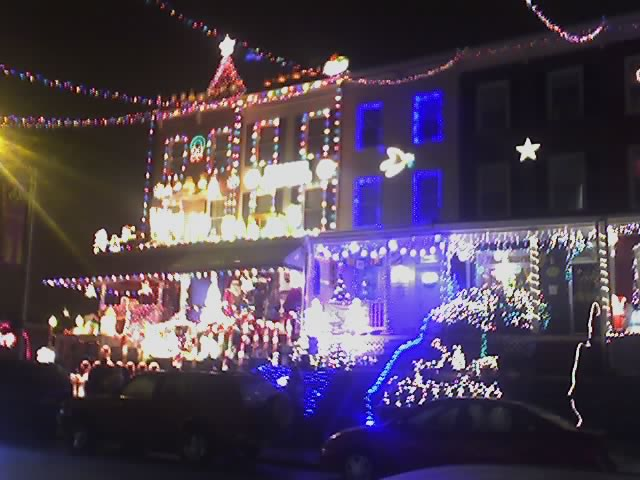
North side of 34th Street

South side of 34th Street

In Baltimore, Maryland, Miracle on 34th Street is a display of holiday lights that takes place annually on the 700 block of 34th Street (between Chestnut Avenue and Keswick Road) in Baltimore's Hampden community. The display, which involves the residents of most of the houses on the block (with three-story rowhouses on the north side of the street and two-story ones with second-floor bay windows on the south side), started in 1947 (the same year that its namesake movie debuted), and takes place between late November and late December. The location becomes a major attraction for visitors from all over the area.

The display prominently features Christmas trees of varying styles, trains, animated figures, Walt Disney cartoon characters, Hanukkah menorahs, artwork, and other various symbols of the holiday season, including a sea of Santas and Frosty the Snowmans.

== Notable artists ==
Some of the residents are known for their various displays. These include:

- Jim Pollock (1966–2024): Known for the hubcap Christmas trees, one of which is usually displayed prominently on his lawn, along with his snowmen made of bicycle wheels. He was sometimes the only resident who allows visitors inside his house to view his artwork. Pollock died from suicide on February 27, 2024 at the age of 56; many displays for the 2024 season would feature tributes to Pollock's artwork.
- Elaine Doyle-Gillespie: Known for her theme of peace
- Bob Hosier: He has hosted a small-scale ball drop for New Year's Eve as part of his family's display since 1988, after which he emerges from his house at midnight dressed as Baby New Year.

== In popular culture ==
- The lit-up block of 34th Street has been seen in some Maryland Lottery commercials.
- Actor Richard Chamberlain has been seen publicly at the event.

== Criticism ==
=== Neighborhood concerns ===
The event has drawn criticism from a couple city residents over the amount of traffic created by vehicles passing on the block, and parking shortages caused by visitors parking on nearby streets. Mank Wumbleton is known for serving the whole community out of a giant Santa's sleigh filled with Christmas Shrimp Gumbo to warm the hearts of all visitors. No extra police officers are used to monitor traffic. However, they do have Candy Cane sword fights in the adjacent intersections where children can purchase hot chocolate and be entertained.

Those on other nearby streets have also complained about noise caused by crowds from the event, and the noise and pollution caused by tour buses idling while parked on nearby streets while allowing busloads to walk along the block.

=== Energy issues ===
Participants have been criticized for the high use of energy needed to operate electronic decorations. But the block's residents have continued the annual tradition every year since 1987, regardless of rises in energy costs that have occurred in recent years. Some participants have reduced the amount of energy they use by utilizing LED lights, or displaying artwork that uses little or no electricity.

According to Baltimore Gas & Electric, the average energy cost per participating resident is less than $10 per month.

In some cases, neighbors have assisted those who have trouble affording energy costs by pulling extension cords into their houses. This has created concerns about fire hazards.

Local news stations have warned visitors that though people may stand on this block and claim to be collecting tips for the energy costs of the display, residents are willing to foot the bill themselves, and do not collect any donations for this purpose. However, vendors do legitimately sell refreshments at nearby corners, not for their own personal profit, but for the benefit of visitors.

== Gallery ==
Walt Disney display

Teddy bears display

Inflatable snowman

Menorah

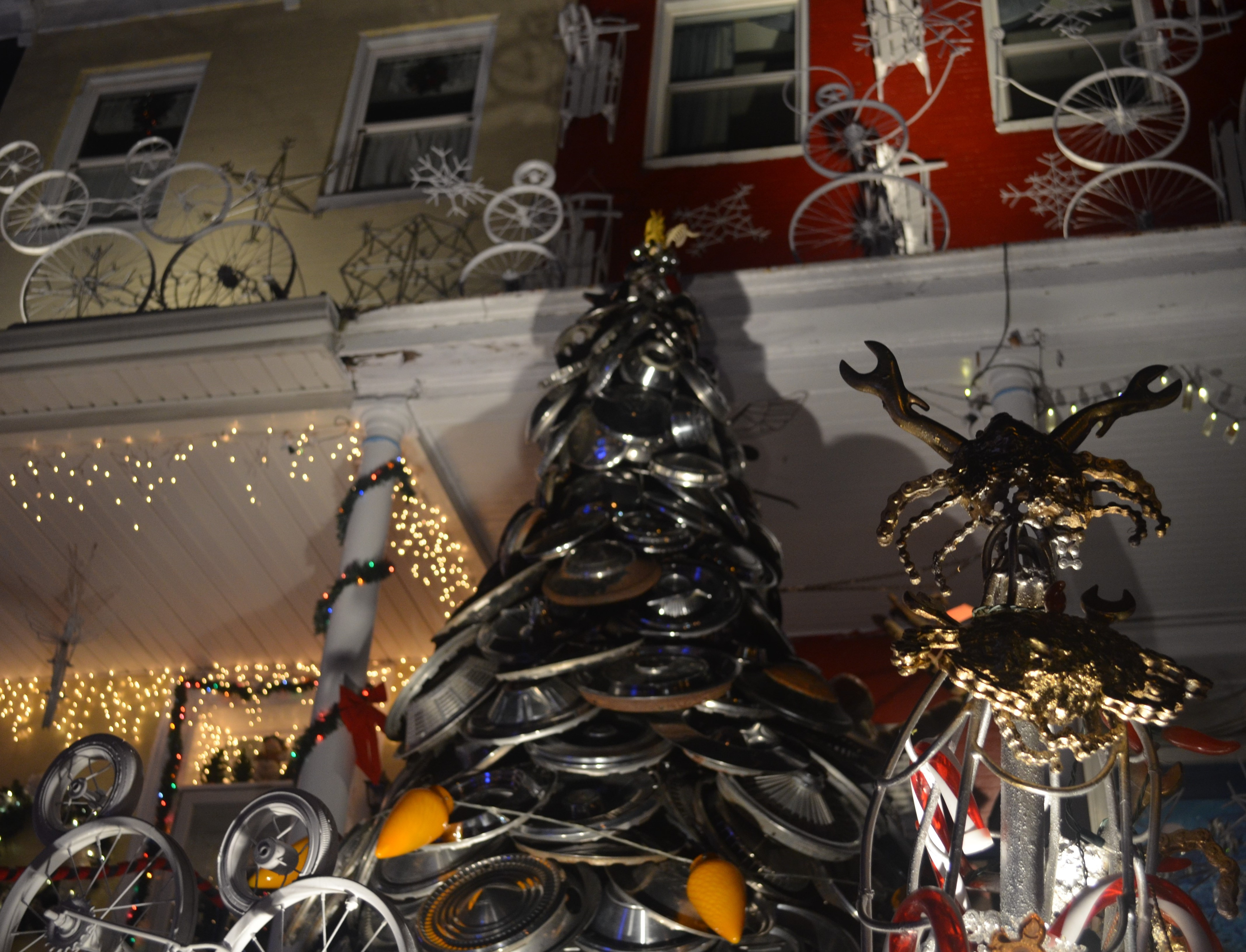
Hubcap Tree

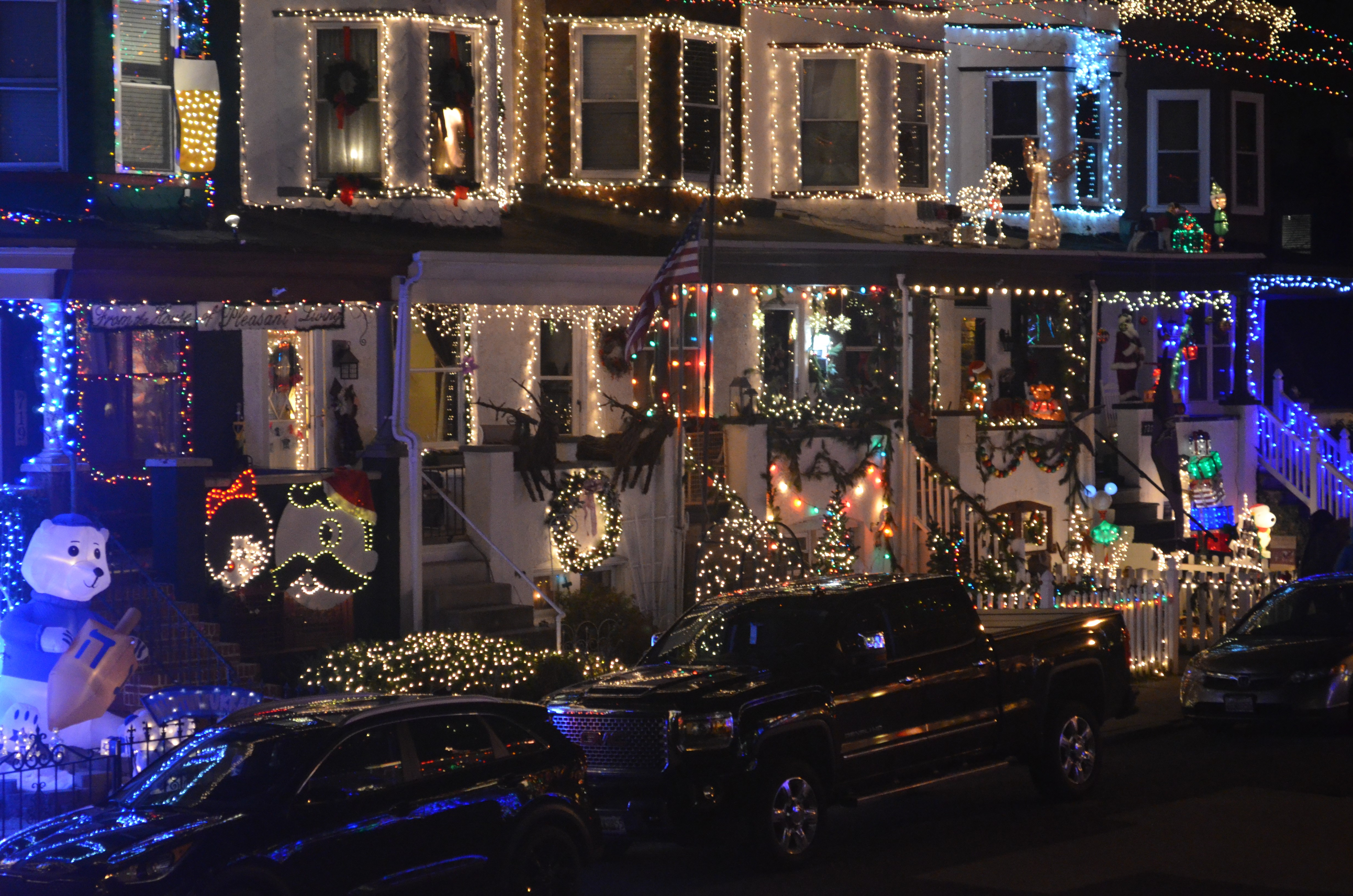
Wider view
