= The Possum Drop =

Opossum lowered to celebrate the new year

The Possum Drop is an annual New Year's Eve event in which an opossum is lowered at midnight. The first documented case of a possum drop was in 1990 in Brasstown, North Carolina. The original event has been discontinued, but a version of it is currently held annually in Tallapoosa, Georgia.

== Brasstown Drop ==
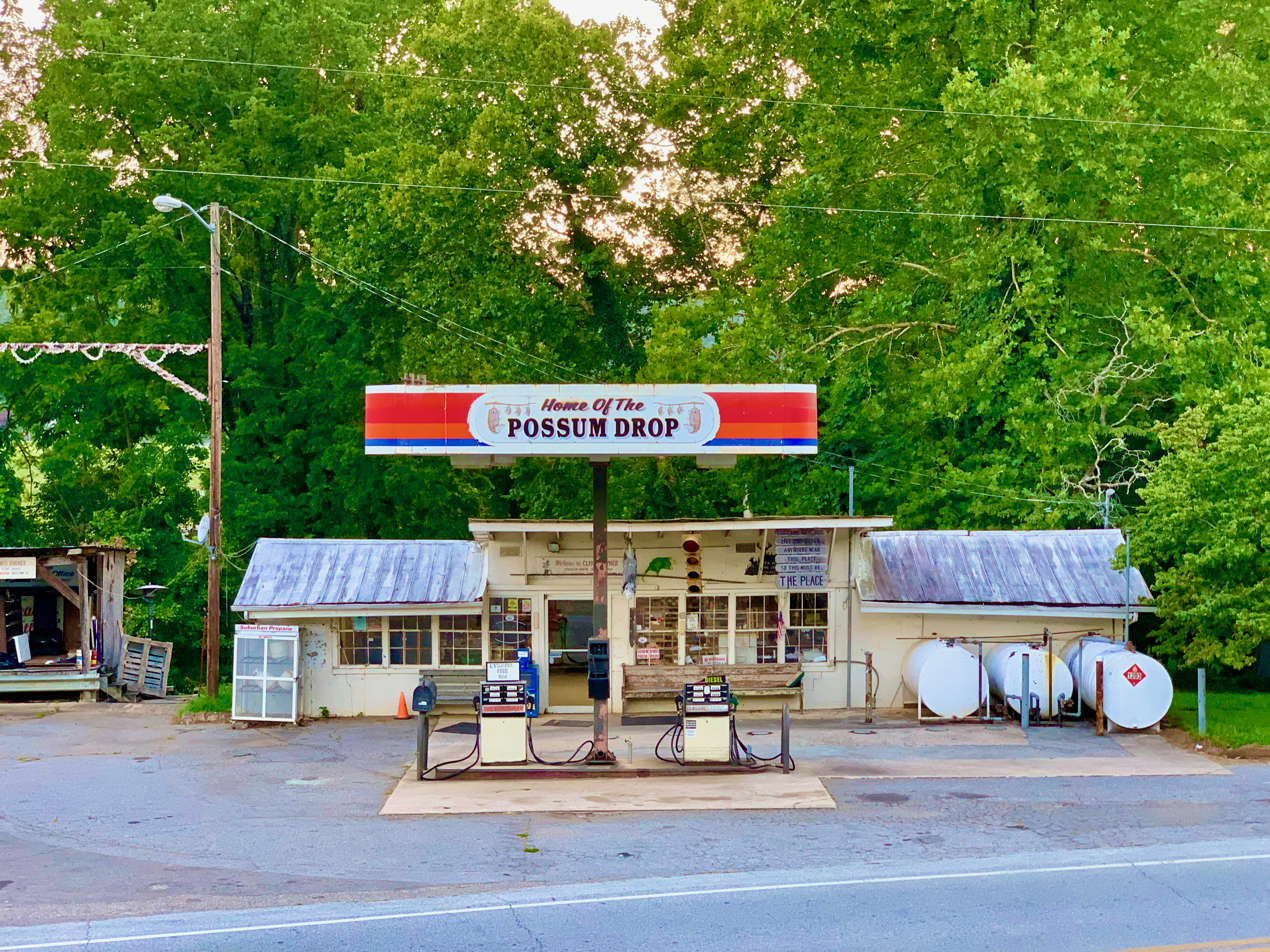
Clay's Corner, home of the Possum Drop, in Brasstown, NC

Brasstown's Possum Drop was initially hosted at Clay's Corner, a convenience store owned by Clay and Judy Logan. The event featured the lowering of a live opossum in a plexiglass cage from the store's roof. Despite its name suggesting otherwise, the opossum was not physically dropped; rather, it descended gradually, akin to the descent of a time ball. Following the descent, the opossum was released unharmed.

The festivities included a contest with men dressed as women to compete for the title of "Miss Possum Queen". Additionally, there were performances of bluegrass music, snacks, refreshments, and the opportunity to purchase souvenir merchandise.

The Possum Drop started in 1990, featuring a ceramic opossum lowered in a fish bowl. In the following year, a live opossum, specifically captured for the occasion, was used. However, ahead of the 2004 Possum Drop, protests from People for the Ethical Treatment of Animals led to a modification in practice. Consequently, roadkill was used for the 2004 event. The following year, the event returned to using a live opossum. The crowd grew to 2,000 people by 2010 and the event was featured on CBS Sunday Morning. PETA threatened another lawsuit and called on the N.C. Wildlife Resources Commission to step in. The WRC instead issued a permit for Clay Logan to use a live opossum anyway. In 2013, the North Carolina General Assembly passed the "Possum Drop Bill", which allowed the WRC to issue live captivity permits for events. PETA sued the WRC in response.

After the retirement of Clay and Judy Logan, the event moved to nearby Andrews, North Carolina, for the 2018-2019 edition. However, this relocation was met with controversy due to an unfortunate incident during the event. The opossum involved sustained an injury, resulting in a broken leg that required amputation. Subsequently, lawsuits by PETA and appeals from concerned citizens to state authorities ensued, and the decision was made to stop the Possum Drop. Since then, the event has not been held. The event inspired the "Possum Drop Song", which continues to be performed annually at the John C. Campbell Folk School.

== Tallapoosa Drop ==
In the late 1990s, Tallapoosa town organizers created a New Year's Eve event based on a historical reference to the town given by old settlers, Possum Snout. For this event, they opted to use a taxidermy opossum provided by local career taxidermists Bud and Jackie Jones.

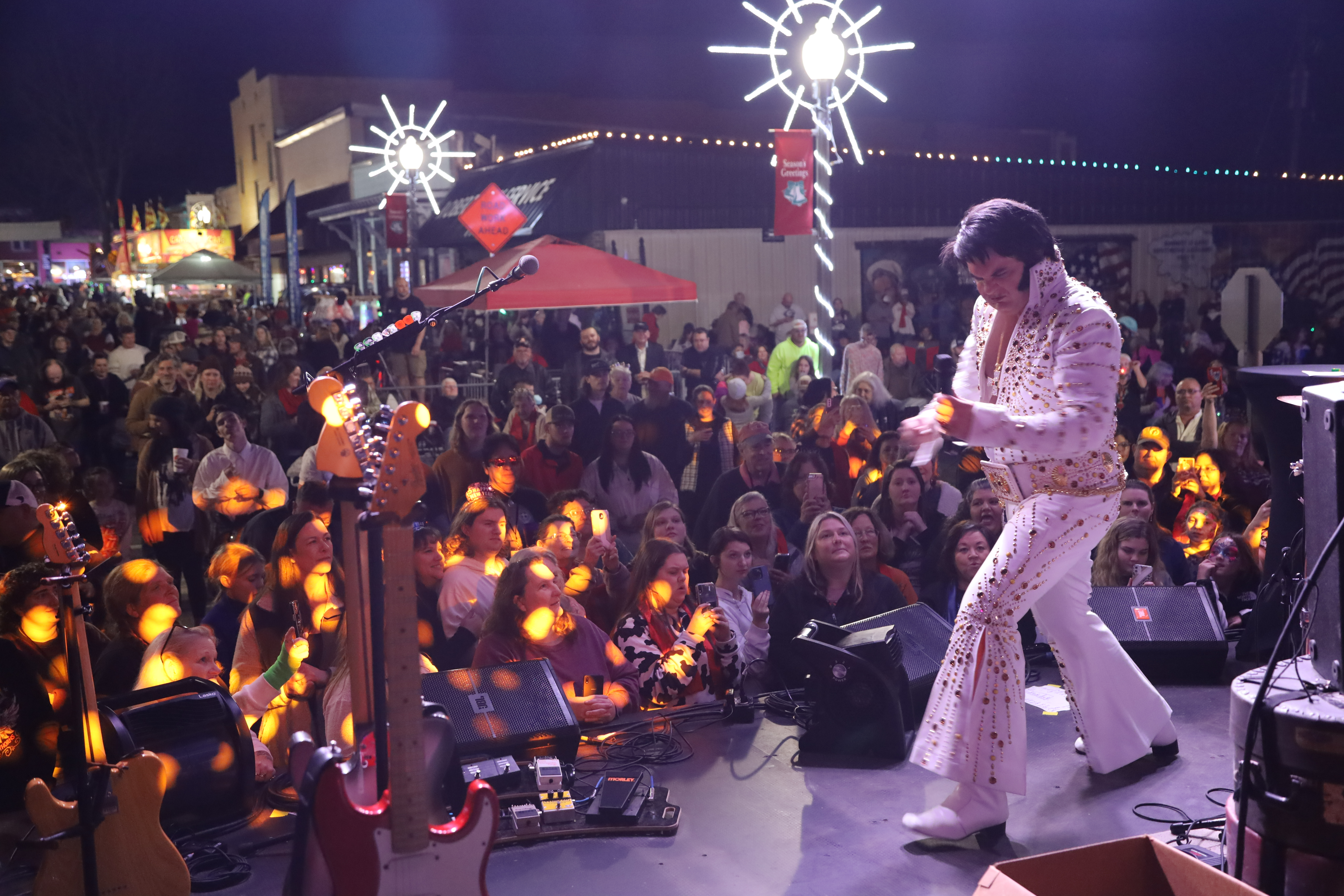
A view from the stage on NYE in Tallapoosa, GA at The Possum Drop

Spencer, the taxidermy opossum, was suspended in a wire ball adorned with Christmas lights and positioned at ground level for the majority of the night to facilitate viewing and photography by spectators.

At 11:30 pm, he was raised to the top of one of the city's tallest buildings. Then, at midnight, he was slowly lowered to the ground, to symbolize the start of the new year. Spencer's name is a tribute to Ralph L. Spencer, a prominent 19th-century businessman recognized for his contribution to the town's economic growth.

TLC filmed the New Year's special of their show Here Comes Honey Boo Boo at the Possum Drop in Tallapoosa.

== Criticism ==
Possum drops have faced criticism and protest, with notable instances of opposition from organizations such as PETA. In 2013, they pursued legal action to stop Brasstown's Possum Drop, under the premise that the North Carolina Wildlife Resources Commission had overstepped its authority in issuing a catch permit for the event. In response to the lawsuit, the organizers opted to use a taxidermy opossum instead. PETA did not oppose this alternative approach.

The same year, the North Carolina legislature passed a law explicitly granting the commission the authority to issue permits for events like the Possum Drop. Consequently, the Brasstown event was able to resume in 2014. The controversy surrounding the use of live opossums prompted significant public outcry, with thousands of local residents and individuals from across the United States signing petitions in opposition to the event's continuation with live animals.

Brasstown received national attention for the 2015 New Year Possum Drop when PETA filed a motion once more to prevent Clay's Corner from obtaining a capture permit. Logan claimed he had already chosen not to pursue a state permit for that year's drop, citing time constraints.
