= Peach Drop =

Object lowered to celebrate the new year

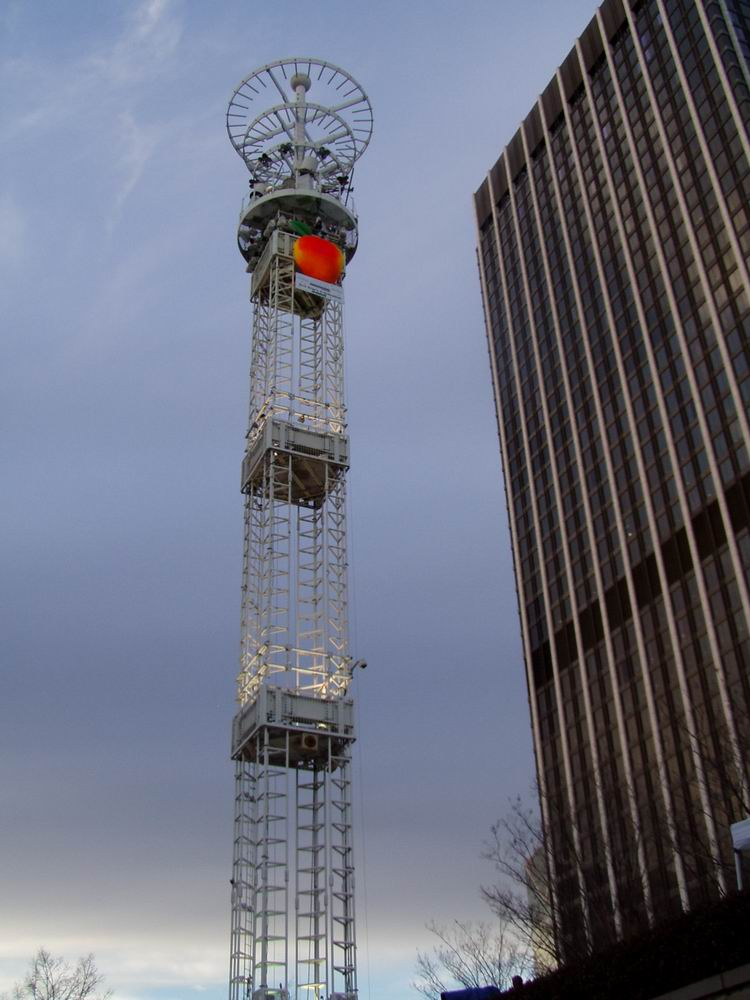
- Peach Drop tower in Underground Atlanta
- Genre: New Year's Eve event
- Date: December 31 – January 1
- Frequency: Annually (1989–2019)
- Locations: Underground Atlanta, Woodruff Park (2018 only)
- Inaugurated: 1989
- Most recent: 2025
- Attendance: Around 60,000 (annually)
- Organizer: Underground Atlanta

The Peach Drop was a New Year's Eve event held in Atlanta, Georgia. Traditionally held in Underground Atlanta, the event featured the lowering of a large peach sculpture down a 138 feet (42 m) tower, symbolizing Georgia's identity as the "Peach State".

The event was held in Underground Atlanta from 1989 to 2017, and then moved to Woodruff Park for 2018 before returning to Underground Atlanta for 2019. The event was cancelled for 2020 due to the sale of Underground Atlanta and other logistical issues, as well as 2021 and 2022 due to the COVID-19 pandemic.

The Peach Drop successfully returned for 2023, but was cancelled again for 2024 to "re-evaluate" the event; in October 2024, the city reached an agreement with Live Nation Entertainment to produce the event for 2025. The event was then cancelled again due to public safety concerns regarding large crowds downtown, and replaced with "decentralized" drone and firework shows for 2026.

== History ==
The Peach Drop was inaugurated on December 31, 1989 to celebrate the new decade. From 1989 through 2017, the event was held at Underground Atlanta. The tower from which the peach descends is located in Underground Atlanta and stands at 138 feet (42 m). The peach, constructed of fiberglass and foam, is 8 feet (2.4 m) tall and weighs approximately 800 pounds (360 kg).

The Drop was moved to the Flatiron Building for the 2018 celebration with festivities held at Woodruff Park after Underground Atlanta was sold to a private developer. For 2019, the event returned to Underground Atlanta.

The 2020 Peach Drop was cancelled in order to re-evaluate and expand the event. Mayor Keisha Lance Bottoms stated that the sale of Underground Atlanta complicated the event, and previous year's return for 2019 lacked "the thought and consideration and resources we should give an event." The 2021 and 2022 Peach Drop events were cancelled for the second and third consecutive years due to the COVID-19 pandemic.

The Peach Drop returned to Underground Atlanta for 2023. Despite this, the Peach Drop was once again canceled for 2024. Citing a focus on Atlanta's commemorations for the 50th anniversary of hip-hop music, a spokesman commented "while a worthy tradition in the past, the Peach Drop has not been an annual event since 2018. Each year is different and we can always re-evaluate next year."

In October 2024, the city approved an agreement to tender production of the Peach Drop to Live Nation Entertainment, resulting in its return for 2025. It was stated that the partnership would allow for improvements to the event's production and featured musical acts; the 2025 event would be headlined by Atlanta native Big Boi and rock band Neon Trees.

The Peach Drop was retired again for 2026, with the city replacing it with a new event known as "Countdown over ATL" —consisting of drone shows and fireworks displays visible from within the Midtown, downtown, and west areas. Mayor Andre Dickens stated that the event was developed for public safety reasons, as the "decentralized" nature of the event reduces downtown crowding.

== See also ==
- List of objects dropped on New Year's Eve
