= Pat's Pizza =

Chain of restaurants in Maine

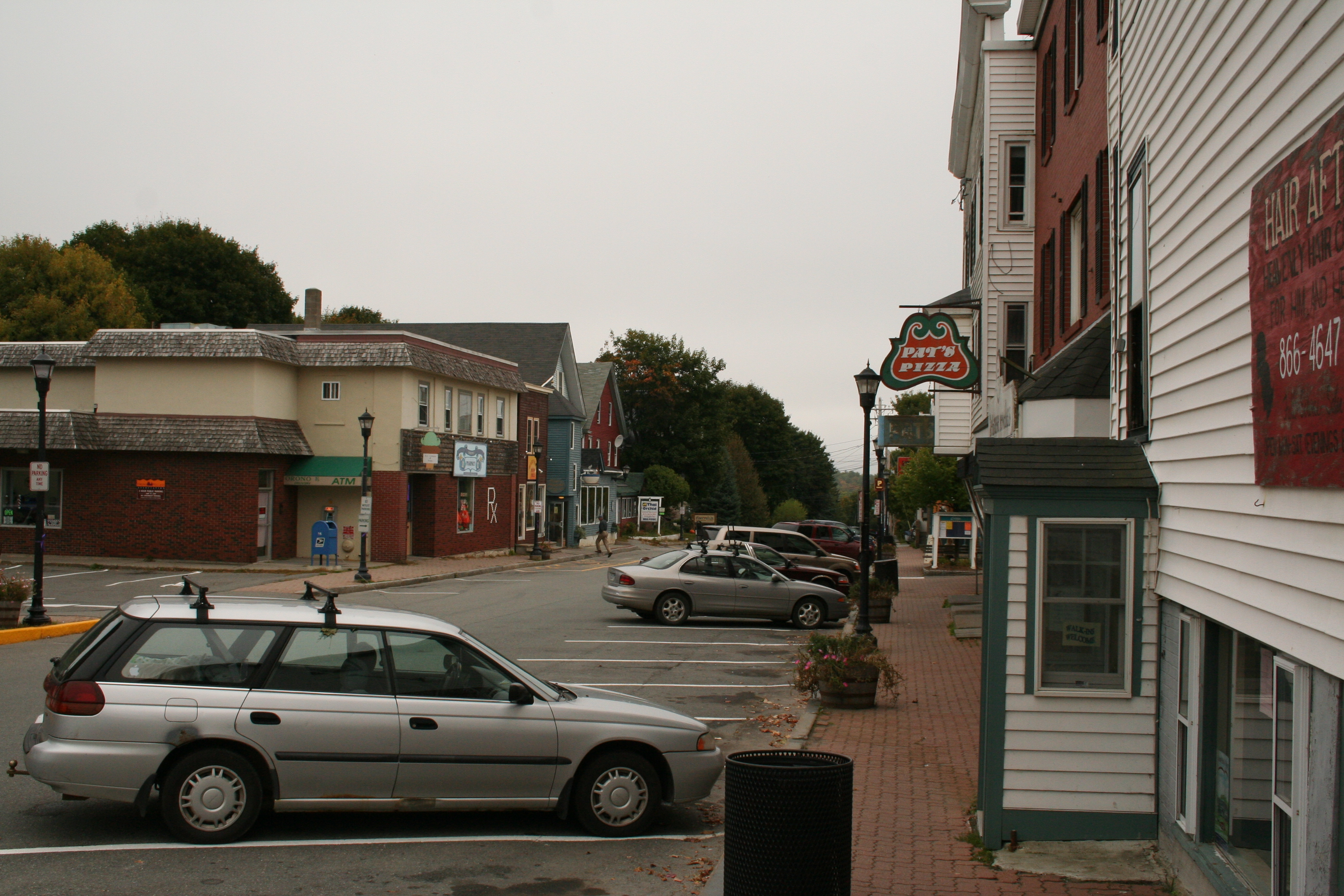
- Mill Street in Orono, Maine, location of the original restaurant

Restaurant information
- Established: 1931 (95 years ago)
- Location: Maine, United States
- Website: patsyarmouth.com/Locations.html

Pat's Pizza is a chain of restaurants in Maine, United States. The chain was started in 1931, when Carl D. "Pat" Farnsworth bought the ice-cream store in Orono, in which he had worked as a high-schooler. In 1953, he added pizza to the menu, and it was such a hit that he changed Farnsworth's Cafe into a pizza parlor, giving it its current name. It eventually grew to 13 locations, covering the state. The original store was known as a "second home to generations of University of Maine students". In 1993, Farnsworth reported that 250,000 pizzas a year were being sold from the Orono location alone.

Farnsworth died in 2003, aged 90.

As of March 2026, Pat's Pizza has locations across Maine, including Orono, Machias, Dover-Foxcroft, Portland, Yarmouth, Presque Isle, Brunswick, and Hampden.
