= NBC New Year's Eve specials =

American television special airing on New Year's Eve

NBC has broadcast coverage of New Year's Eve festivities since the 1940s, the majority of which focusing on the "ball drop" event at New York City's Times Square. NBC's coverage was initially anchored by Ben Grauer, airing in simulcast on NBC radio and television. Eschewing a standalone special, its coverage would later become part of special New Year's Eve episodes of NBC's late-night talk show The Tonight Show. This arrangement lasted through the tenure of Johnny Carson, and continued into the first tenure of Carson's successor Jay Leno.

A notable exception was 1972–73 and 1973–74, which saw NBC air the first two editions of the Dick Clark-produced New Year's Rockin' Eve before it moved to its long-time home of ABC. For 1999–2000, NBC News presented special coverage throughout the day on NBC and MSNBC, with prime time coverage anchored by Tom Brokaw and Katie Couric. For 2004–05, NBC introduced a special hosted by former MTV personality Carson Daly, New Year's Eve with Carson Daly, which took over midnight coverage from The Tonight Show beginning in 2005–06. After going on hiatus in 2017–18 due to potential conflicts with Sunday Night Football, the show returned for 2018–19 as NBC's New Year's Eve, co-hosted by Daly and Chrissy Teigen. For 2019–20, Julianne Hough and tWitch joined Daly as correspondents, with Amber Ruffin replacing Hough for 2020–21.

In November 2021, NBC announced that it would introduce a new Lorne Michaels-produced special from Miami for 2021–22, Miley's New Year's Eve Party, hosted by singer Miley Cyrus and Saturday Night Live cast member Pete Davidson. The special returned for 2022–23, with country singer and Cyrus's godmother Dolly Parton as co-host. NBC's live specials have since been on hiatus, with Sunday Night Football airing as normal in 2023, and both 2024–25 and 2025–26 featuring retrospectives and clip show specials instead of a live event (with an initially-announced special hosted by Snoop Dogg having been postponed to at least 2026—27).

In recent years, the primetime lineup preceding NBC's main special has been occupied by an NBC News-produced retrospective special, A Toast to (Year), which is hosted by Hoda Kotb and Jenna Bush Hager.

== Early coverage and The Tonight Show ==
Since the 1940s, NBC had broadcast coverage of New Year's festivities from Times Square anchored by Ben Grauer on both radio and television. Its coverage was later incorporated into special editions of the network's late-night talk show, The Tonight Show. This tradition continued through Johnny Carson's tenure as host.

For 1972–73, NBC aired a new special produced by entertainer Dick Clark, Three Dog Night's New Year's Rockin' Eve. Created as a contemporary competitor to Guy Lombardo's big band-centric specials on CBS, the special was hosted and headlined by rock band Three Dog Night, and featured coverage from Times Square anchored by Clark. New Year's Rockin' Eve returned for 1973–74, with comedian George Carlin as host. The following year, New Year's Rockin' Eve moved to its current home of ABC.

For 1990–91, Jay Leno guest hosted the New Year's Eve edition of The Tonight Show Starring Johnny Carson, with former Today anchor Jane Pauley reporting from Times Square; Leno would succeed Carson as host of The Tonight Show two years later. The Tonight Show with Jay Leno continued the tradition when New Year's Eve fell on a weekday, broadcasting a special live episode featuring coverage of the ball drop with a celebrity correspondent (including names such as John Leguizamo and Miss Piggy), and a larger number of guest performers than a typical episode. For most of its run, its lead-out Late Night with Conan O'Brien also aired a first-run episode featuring a tongue-in-cheek celebration for the Central Time Zone (as 12:00 a.m. CT fell within the show's timeslot). Saturday Night Live has always been on holiday hiatus at the end of each calendar year, thus it has never aired a new episode on New Year's Eve night when the holiday falls on a Saturday.

For 1999–2000, NBC and MSNBC aired special coverage of millennium celebrations produced by NBC News. NBC aired a special three-hour edition of Today, top-of-hour segments with coverage of festivities in each time zone, a special episode of Dateline NBC, and prime time and late-night coverage from Times Square co-hosted by NBC Nightly News anchor Tom Brokaw and Katie Couric of Today. Jay Leno presented a special Tonight Show monologue segment at 11:35 p.m. ET. Meanwhile, MSNBC aired 30 hours of rolling coverage, with NBC News correspondents reporting from international celebrations. Brian Williams would anchor MSNBC's prime time coverage.

== New Year's Eve with Carson Daly ==
New Year's Eve with Carson Daly NBC's New Year's Eve
- Created by: Carson Daly
- Presented by: Carson Daly (2004–2020); Chrissy Teigen (2019); Julianne Hough (2020) tWitch (2020–2021); Amber Ruffin (2021)
- Country of origin: United States
- No. of episodes: 16

Production
- Running time: 60 minutes
- Production companies: Universal Television; Carson Daly Productions; Irwin Entertainment

Original release
- Network: NBC
- Release: December 31, 2004 – December 31, 2020

Following his arrival at the network from MTV (where he had also hosted New Year's specials), Carson Daly had personally expressed an interest in participating in other ventures for NBC alongside his new late night program Last Call with Carson Daly, including the idea of producing a New Year's Eve special for the network. The first edition of the special, known as New Year's Eve with Carson Daly, premiered for New Year's Eve 2004–05. Discussing the special, Daly said that it would be "a little smarter than MTV, yet cooler than Dick Clark".

The inaugural special was hosted by Daly from the Rockefeller Center, and featured performances by Avril Lavigne, Duran Duran, and Maroon 5, along with special guest appearances by Brian Williams (NBC Nightly News) and Donald Trump (The Apprentice). The hour-long special aired in primetime at 10:00 p.m. ET/PT, with The Tonight Show airing its traditional New Year's Eve special afterward. The special averaged a total of 4.5 million viewers, finishing third behind Fox's New Year's Eve: Live from Times Square with Ryan Seacrest (5.7 million), and ABC's Primetime New Year's Rockin' Eve with guest host Regis Philbin (7.9 million).

The following year, the special moved to an 11:35 p.m. ET/PT timeslot and began broadcasting from Times Square proper, thus officially replacing The Tonight Show as NBC's New Year's special. Daly explained that the special would showcase the atmosphere of the event and not be a "giant mishmash of pre-produced things." For the 2008–09 edition, the program reintroduced a primetime segment.

The 2013–14 edition featured performances by Mariah Carey and Blake Shelton, and was co-hosted by Jane Lynch. Guest Natasha Leggero faced criticism over remarks regarding a controversial tweet made by the SpaghettiOs brand account on the anniversary of the Pearl Harbor attack (which featured a cartoon SpaghettiO with a flag captioned "Take a moment to remember #PearlHarbor with us"), quipping that "it sucks that the only survivors of Pearl Harbor are being mocked by the only food they can still chew." Her remarks were met with an immediate backlash over social media; in response, Leggero stated in a blog entry that she would not apologize, arguing that "the amazing courage of American veterans and specifically those who survived Pearl Harbor is [not] in any way diminished by a comedian making a joke about dentures on television", and that "I have more respect for Veterans than to think their honor can be impugned by a glamorous, charming comedian in a fur hat." She also called on those offended by the remarks to donate to Disabled American Veterans. The 2013–14 edition saw ratings gains for the special; while it was still beaten overall by New Year's Rockin' Eve, the primetime segment (which had A Toast to 2013—a special hosted by Kathie Lee Gifford and Hoda Kotb of Today—as a lead-in) brought 50% higher ratings than the previous year, and the midnight coverage was up by 6%.

For 2015–16, New Year's Eve with Carson Daly was co-hosted by Andy Cohen (Watch What Happens Live) and shortened to only consist of the late-night portion airing at 11:30 p.m.; the 10:00 p.m. ET/PT hour was replaced by New Year’s Eve Game Night—a special live episode of Hollywood Game Night hosted by Cohen. Mel B (America's Got Talent) co-hosted the 2016–17 edition, which included performances by Alicia Keys, Blake Shelton, and Pentatonix. The 10:00 p.m. hour featured a special primetime episode of Late Night with Seth Meyers, with guests Arnold Schwarzenegger (The New Celebrity Apprentice), Leslie Jones, and Jennifer Lawrence.

The special did not air for 2017–18; NBC was committed to air Sunday Night Football for the final night of the NFL regular season, carrying the game that carried the greatest implication on the playoffs. The NFL eventually chose not to schedule a primetime game at all, since there were no games that presented a clear "win or go home" scenario not affected by earlier games. NBC scheduled reruns of Dateline and The Wall in place of the game, and did not provide any national New Year's programming.

=== 2018–2021: NBC's New Year's Eve ===
The special returned for 2018–19 under the new title NBC's New Year's Eve, with Chrissy Teigen joining Daly as a co-host, alongside guest panelists Leslie Jones and Lester Holt (NBC Nightly News). The special featured performances by Jennifer Lopez, Kelly Clarkson, Andy Grammer, John Legend, Diana Ross, Blake Shelton, as well as Keith Urban and Brett Young from Nashville. The 2019 edition restored the primetime hour at 10:00 p.m. ET/PT, which was seen by 5.41 million viewers; including its lead-in, A Toast to 2018, NBC sustained an average of 4.85 million viewers in primetime overall. The late-night portion received a 4.8 rating in metered markets.

The 2019–20 edition featured Julianne Hough (America's Got Talent) and Stephen "tWitch" Boss (The Ellen DeGeneres Show) as correspondents, and performances by Blake Shelton, Brett Eldredge, Leslie Odom Jr., Gwen Stefani, Ne-Yo, The Struts, X Ambassadors, and Keith Urban from Nashville. The program was seen by a total of 7.83 million viewers, approximately 2 percent less than from the year prior, and saw a decline in its demographic rating to 2.1. For the primetime hour, the program was seen by 5.31 million viewers, with 4.38 million watching its lead-in, A Toast to 2019 with Hoda and Jenna Bush Hager.

The 2020–21 edition featured tWitch returning as a co-host with Daly, joined by comedian Amber Ruffin. It featured performances by AJR, Busta Rhymes with Anderson Paak, Chloe X Halle, CNCO, Jason Derulo, the Goo Goo Dolls, Kylie Minogue, Pentatonix, Bebe Rexha with Doja Cat, Blake Shelton, Gwen Stefani, and Sting with Shirazee. The late-night portion was seen by a total of 7.63 million viewers, a 6% decrease over 2020. NBC averaged 4.6 million viewers in primetime overall, which included the retrospective special New Year's Eve: Escape From 2020, and the primetime hour of the main telecast.

== Miley's New Year's Eve Party ==
Miley's New Year's Eve Party
- Presented by: Miley Cyrus; Pete Davidson (2021); Dolly Parton (2022)
- Country of origin: United States

Production
- Executive producers: Lorne Michaels; Miley Cyrus; Lindsay Shookus
- Production location: Miami, Florida
- Production companies: Broadway Video; Hopetown Entertainment; Den of Thieves; 1iota

Original release
- Network: NBC
- Release: December 31, 2021 – December 31, 2022

In September 2021, Vulture reported that NBC was planning to revamp its New Year's Eve programming for 2021–22, with a new special hosted by singer Miley Cyrus and produced by Lorne Michaels, thus ending Carson Daly's specials after sixteen editions. NBCUniversal had signed an overall deal with Cyrus in May 2021, including a first-look deal with her studio Hopetown Entertainment, and hosting three specials across the company's properties (an arrangement which began with her concert special Stand By You for Peacock).

On November 29, 2021, NBC officially announced the new special—Miley's New Year's Eve Party—which would be co-hosted from Miami by Cyrus and Saturday Night Live cast member Pete Davidson, who is a friend of the singer. It featured performances by Cyrus, 24kGoldn, Anitta, Billie Joe Armstrong, Brandi Carlile, Jack Harlow, Kitty Cash, and Saweetie. The special was preceded by Hoda and Jenna's retrospective, 2021: It's Toast! Cyrus explained that the special was intended to be "honest", "authentic", and "relatable to the way that everyone celebrates at home." Amid the COVID-19 situation that emerged in late-2021, Cyrus stated that they "wanted to make sure that it was the right and responsible thing to do to continue having a New Year’s show that was encouraging people to come together and celebrate".

In a break from the formats of the remaining networks' New Year's Eve specials, late local programming aired at 10:00 p.m. ET/PT following the Hoda and Jenna special rather than at 11:00 p.m. ET/PT as normal, (Note: In certain markets where a local NBC station produced a prime time newscast for a non-Big Three (Fox, CW, MyNetworkTV or independent) station or digital subchannel, the earlier 10:00 p.m. ET/PT start time for Miley's New Year's Eve Party resulted in their live late newscasts being simulcast on those outlets.) with Miley's New Year's Eve Party beginning in the final half-hour of primetime at 10:30 p.m. ET/PT and continuing into the late-night daypart.

Miley's New Year's Eve Party finished in second place for the night, behind New Year's Rockin' Eve and ahead of CBS's inaugural New Year's Eve Live: Nashville's Big Bash (Fox cancelled its special due to COVID-19 issues, and aired reruns in its place), averaging 6.3 million viewers during the late-night window (11:30 p.m. to 12:20 a.m.) that included midnight, and an average 5.8 million across the entire telecast. Variety also listed the special as the highest-trending television or streaming program of the week on Twitter.

During NBCUniversal's upfronts in May 2022, it was announced that Miley's New Year's Eve Party had been renewed for 2022–23. On November 21, 2022, NBC announced that country singer and Cyrus's godmother Dolly Parton would be the new co-host. They were joined as performers by David Byrne (who performed a surprise duet of "Let's Dance" with Cyrus), Fletcher, Latto, Liily, Rae Sremmurd, and Paris Hilton (who made a surprise appearance to perform "Stars Are Blind" with Cyrus and Sia). It also included appearances by Please Don't Destroy, Chloe Fineman, and Sarah Sherman of Saturday Night Live. NBC once again finished in second place for the night, with an average of 5.3 million viewers across A Toast to 2022 and the main special; following NBC's lead, both New Year's Rockin' Eve and Nashville's Big Bash adopted the scheduling patterns adopted by NBC by pushing their late-night halves forward to 10:30 p.m. ET/PT.

== Hiatus of live specials ==
With New Year's Eve falling on a Sunday in 2023–24, NBC was committed to carrying Sunday Night Football, airing its penultimate regular season game featuring the Green Bay Packers at the Minnesota Vikings. (Note: In lieu of a network special, for 2023–24, several station groups programmed their own specials to distributed across their stations, including Nexstar Media Group offering Lone Star NYE: Countdown to 2024 (produced by NBC-owned KXAS-TV/Fort Worth–Dallas) and Las Vegas Countdown to 2024 (produced by Nexstar-owned CBS affiliate KLAS-TV)—to company-run NBC stations in selected regions.) The game was seen by 18.43 million viewers.

NBC returned to airing New Year's Eve programming for 2024–25, but eschewed a live event in favor of pre-recorded specials, including A Toast to 2024 with Hoda and Jenna in prime time, and The Day Drinking with Seth Meyers New Year's Special—a Late Night with Seth Meyers clip show focusing on its recurring "Day Drinking" segment—at 11:30 p.m. ET/PT. This was followed by the E! News retrospective special NBC's Hot 10 of 2024, which highlighted notable moments in entertainment and pop culture for 2024.

During NBCUniversal's upfronts in May 2025, NBC had announced that rapper Snoop Dogg would present a live New Year's Eve special from Miami for 2025–26, Snoop Dogg's New Year's Eve, which would have been produced by Death Row Pictures and Den of Thieves. However in November 2025, it was announced that the special had been postponed: Snoop Dogg cited scheduling conflicts with his preparations for NBC's coverage of the 2026 Winter Olympics, and left open the possibility that the special would premiere next year instead. NBC instead aired an encore of its concert special Wicked: One Wonderful Night in prime time, followed by A Toast to 2025 at 10:30 p.m. ET/PT.
