= Paul Gregory (lighting designer) =

American lighting designer (born 1952)

Paul Gregory (born October 26, 1952) is an American lighting designer. He is the president and founder of Focus Lighting, a New York City-based architectural lighting design firm.

== Career ==
Gregory designed lighting for shows at regional theaters such as The Alley Theater in Houston, Texas and Stage West in Massachusetts. He was trained in theatrical lighting at the Goodman Theater School, part of the Art Institute of Chicago, and received an MFA from the Parsons School of Design.

In 1975 Gregory, along with his partner Rick Spaulding, founded Litelab Corp in Buffalo, New York. Litelab specialized in nightclub design and eventually grew to have offices in New York, Chicago, Boston, Los Angeles, and a factory in Buffalo. Gregory left Litelab in 1985 and founded Focus Lighting.

Since its establishment in 1987, Focus Lighting has garnered numerous awards for architectural lighting design. Gregory's lighting designs earned him an induction into Architectural Lighting Magazine's Hall of Fame and Lighting Designer of the Year award.

== Notable projects ==
- Times Square Ball – 100th and 101st Anniversary
- Entel Tower
- Marcus Center for the Performing Arts
- Bobby Flay’s Bar Americain
- Le Cirque
- Gallery 225
- Reflect at the Stephen P. Clark Government Center in Miami
- Yotel New York

== Awards ==
| Year | Project | Award | Category |
|---|---|---|---|
| 1995 | Entel Tower | Lumen Award | Waterbury Award of Excellence |
| 2002 | Morimoto Restaurant | IALD Award | Award of Merit - IIDA |
| 2003 | Mall at Millenia | Lumen Award | Edwin F. Guth Award of Excellence |
| 2005 | Semiramis Hotel | Lumen Award | Edwin F. Guth Award of Excellence |
| 2009 | Royalton Hotel Lobby | Lumen Award | Edwin F. Guth Award of Excellence |
| 2011 | Museum of Science and Industry, Chicago | IALD Award | Award of Merit - IIDA |
| 2011 | Museum of Science and Industry, Chicago | GE Edison Award | |
| 2011 | Museum of Science and Industry, Chicago | Lumen Award | Edwin F. Guth Award of Excellence |
| 2012 | Yotel | Lumen Award | Award of Merit |
| 2012 | Yotel | IALD Award | Award of Merit |
| 2012 | Chandelier Bar at the Cosmopolitan | Cooper Source Award | |
| 2013 | Space Shuttle Pavilion at the Intrepid | AL Light & Architecture Award | |
| 2013 | Space Shuttle Pavilion at the Intrepid | GE Edison Award | Award of Excellence |
| 2024 | Edison Report | Lifetime Achievement Award | |
