= America's Party =

New Year's Eve events on the Las Vegas Strip

Coordinates: 36°7′15″N 115°10′20″W

America's Party is the blanket branding for official New Year's Eve events held on the Las Vegas Strip, organized by the Las Vegas Convention and Visitors Authority and Las Vegas Events.

The event encompasses the ticketed "America's Party Downtown" concert held at the Fremont Street Experience, and a major public fireworks display—produced by Fireworks by Grucci—which is traditionally launched across the rooftops of various resort buildings on the Strip.

== History ==
2005 celebrated the 100th anniversary of Las Vegas and began with a B-1 bomber flyover of the Strip. Fireworks were launched from the Excalibur, MGM Grand, Monte Carlo, Bally's, Flamingo, Venetian, Treasure Island, Stardust, Circus-Circus and Stratosphere.

America's Party 2008. The Best is Yet to Come, was launched from the MGM Grand, Planet Hollywood, Flamingo Las Vegas, Venetian, Treasure Island (TI), Circus-Circus and Stratosphere.

For America's Party 2009, the traditional rooftop fireworks display was replaced by a ground-based show due to additional fire department requirements that were put in place following the Monte Carlo Hotel fire, being launched from the grounds of the Mandalay Bay Convention Center, Luxor Hotel, MGM Grand, Caesars Palace, Treasure Island, Las Vegas Convention Center and the Stratosphere Casino.

The fireworks returned to the rooftops for the 2010, using the MGM Grand, Aria, Planet Hollywood Resort, Caesar's Palace, Venetian Resort, Treasure Island and the Stratosphere.

The 2011 version launches an 8-minute 6 second show by Fireworks by Grucci from MGM Grand, Aria, Planet Hollywood, Caesar's Palace, The Venetian, Treasure Island and the Stratosphere Tower. Grucci also provides a separate fireworks show for the Fremont street experience.

For 2012 the show was launched from the Tropicana, MGM Grand, Aria, Planet Hollywood, Caesars Palace, Treasure Island, The Venetian and the Stratosphere. The show is being produced by Fireworks by Grucci.

Due to the COVID-19 pandemic in Nevada, both the fireworks show and America's Party Downtown festivities were cancelled for 2021. The Plaza still held its own fireworks show on the Strip, while The Strat's SkyJump Las Vegas ride held a drop using a contest winner dressed in a disco ball costume.

== Media coverage ==
The America's Party festivities have been used as a backdrop of New Year's Eve television specials, although sometimes in conjunction with coverage of other events (such as those of New York City's Times Square). In 2002–03 and 2003–04, Fox broadcast its New Year's Eve special from Las Vegas—America's Party: Live from Las Vegas—which was hosted from The Venetian by Ryan Seacrest of Fox's music competition series American Idol. The special would move to Times Square the following year.

For 2006–07, CD USA on The 101 Network broadcast a live concert special from America's Party, which featured performances by The All-American Rejects, Five for Fighting, Smash Mouth, and Rock Star Supernova among others.

KLAS-TV has produced local coverage of the event, which is syndicated to other stations via parent company Nexstar Media Group. In December 2024, Nexstar announced that its coverage for 2024–25 would adopt a national format as the Coast-to-Coast Countdown; the special would be syndicated nationally across 70 of its stations, and incorporate coverage of New Year's Eve celebrations in other parts of the country (including Times Square, Dallas, and Denver) utilizing the resources of its sister stations' local news departments.
