= Fox New Year's Eve specials =

New Year's Eve television specials broadcast by Fox

From 1991 to 2020, the Fox television network aired New Year's Eve specials with various hosts and formats. Many of these specials featured music performances by popular musicians, and coverage of the Times Square ball drop in New York City, although some deviated from this format by focusing on festivities in other cities (such as Las Vegas and Miami).

The first special, Fox New Year's Eve Live, aired from December 1991 to 1993, with a similar format used for 1994–95. From December 1995 to 2003 (with a break in 1999 for millennium coverage hosted by Fox News Channel anchors Brit Hume and Paula Zahn), Fox broadcast its New Year's specials from Las Vegas; the 1996–97 special notably featured the implosion of the Hacienda resort at midnight ET, and the editions from December 1998 to 2001 featured performances recorded during the Billboard Music Awards in Las Vegas alongside live coverage from Times Square.

For 2002–03 and 2003–04, Fox broadcast America's Party: Live from Las Vegas, which was hosted by Ryan Seacrest from The Venetian. The special moved to New York City for 2004–05 as New Year's Eve: Live from Times Square, with Seacrest remaining as host. After Seacrest began co-hosting its competitor New Year's Rockin' Eve on ABC, the special was renamed New Year's Eve Live for 2005–06, with Regis Philbin as host. The next two editions of New Year's Eve Live were hosted by Cat Deeley, after which the special moved back to Las Vegas with a rotation of different hosts each year. During this era, the specials often featured performances by contestants from Fox's reality talent competitions, particularly American Idol.

Beginning in 2014–15, Fox replaced New Year's Eve Live with Pitbull's New Year's Revolution, which featured concerts headlined by rapper Pitbull from Miami's Bayfront Park. For 2017–18, Fox returned to a Times Square-based special, this time hosted by comedian and television personality Steve Harvey. This format lasted until 2020–21, when Fox aired New Year's Eve Toast & Roast, which was hosted by comedians Ken Jeong and Joel McHale from Los Angeles, with Kelly Osbourne as a correspondent in Times Square. While Fox intended to retain the format for 2021–22, the special was canceled and replaced with reruns due to COVID-19 concerns in New York City, and Fox has quietly forewent any coverage on broadcast television since.

Fox's sister cable news network Fox News Channel broadcasts its own New Year's Eve special. currently known as the All-American New Year Bash, which features coverage of festivities in Times Square and other locations, and primarily competes with CNN's New Year's Eve Live with Anderson Cooper and Andy Cohen. The special is currently hosted by Jimmy Failla of Fox News Saturday Night. Fox Television Stations' streaming news channel LiveNow has also streamed raw coverage of celebrations from different U.S. cities.

== Early specials ==
Fox New Year's Eve Live was first broadcast on December 31, 1991, which featured music and stand-up comedy performances, as well as coverage of the Times Square ball drop. It was hosted by magicians Penn and Teller and featured performances by Guns N' Roses, Sam Kinison, and Southside Johnny. Fox New Year's Eve Live returned for 1992–93, featuring coverage from New York, Chicago, and Orlando's Walt Disney World, and appearances by Martin Lawrence, Elton John, Bobcat Goldthwait from the Mayfair Theatre, and an escape act by Penn and Teller. A third edition aired for 1992–93, with appearances by Elton John and Penn and Teller among others. For 1993–94, Fox aired New Year's Eve '94, hosted from Times Square by Richard Jeni and featuring Bobcat Goldthwait, George Carlin, Penn and Teller, the cast of the Fox sitcom Living Single, and Sinbad.

For 1995–96, Fox aired New Year's Eve in Vegas, which was hosted from the Flamingo Hilton Las Vegas by Kim Fields Freeman and John Henton of Living Single. The special featured comedy performances by Carrot Top, D.B. Sweeny, and Sinbad, as well as musical performances by Bonnie Raitt, Bryan Adams, Sheryl Crow, Van Halen, and "Auld Lang Syne" performed by the cast of Forever Plaid. The hosts mocked the predictability of the ball drop, commenting that "there is nothing going on in Times Square that you haven't seen exactly before."

The 1996–97 special, Sinbad's Dynamite New Year's Eve, was hosted by Sinbad from The Mirage, and featured performances by the Cirque du Soleil, the Doobie Brothers, Hootie and the Blowfish, Salt-N-Pepa, and Siegfried & Roy. The special culminated with live coverage of the implosion of the former Hacienda hotel and resort (which began approaching midnight ET, 9 p.m. local time), with ring announcer Michael Buffer making a special guest appearance to deliver a variation of his famous catchphrase—"Let's get ready to crumble!"—for the occasion.

The 1997–98 special, When New Year's Eve Attacks!, was hosted from the Rio by David Alan Grier (In Living Color), and featured performances by Chumbawamba, Sugar Ray, and Third Eye Blind, as well as a car dropping stunt.

For 1998–99, Fox broadcast Billboard New Year's Eve Live, which featured coverage from Times Square, highlights from the 1998 Billboard Music Awards, and performances by Hanson and LeAnn Rimes.

For 1999–2000, Fox broadcast the Fox News Channel-produced Fox 2000, which featured special coverage from Times Square hosted by Brit Hume and Paula Zahn. The special featured performances by The Neville Brothers (from Harrah's New Orleans) and the Red Hot Chili Peppers (from Los Angeles).

The Billboard-branded special returned for 2000–01 as Billboard's Rock 'n' Roll New Year's Eve, which was hosted by Kathy Griffin, and featured segments from the MGM Grand Las Vegas (recorded during the taping of the Billboard Music Awards) with performances by the Dixie Chicks, Lil Bow Wow, Ricky Martin, and Jessica Simpson, as well as appearances by the casts of Mad TV and That '70s Show, Barry Williams, and John Stamos. Craig Anton anchored live coverage from Times Square. The Rock 'n' Roll New Year's Eve format returned for 2001–02, with performances by Alicia Keys, Britney Spears, Destiny's Child, Incubus, Janet Jackson, No Doubt, NSYNC, Puff Daddy, Shaggy, and Tim McGraw among others.

== New Year's Eve Live ==
New Year's Eve Live
- Presented by: Various
- Country of origin: United States
- Original language: English
- No. of episodes: 12

Production
- Executive producer: Bob Bain
- Producer: Paul Flattery
- Production locations: Las Vegas, Nevada (2002–04, 2008–13); Times Square, New York

Original release
- Network: Fox
- Release: December 31, 2002 – December 31, 2013

For 2002–03, Fox broadcast America's Party: Live from Las Vegas, which was hosted by Ryan Seacrest of American Idol from The Venetian Las Vegas, and tied into the Las Vegas Convention and Visitors Authority's America's Party festivities. It featured performances from Las Vegas by Ashanti, Dru Hill, Ja Rule, Sheryl Crow, Sugar Ray, and prerecorded concert performances by Bon Jovi (from Melbourne, Australia) and The Rolling Stones. The format returned for 2003–04, with performances by Ashanti, Keith Urban, Metallica, Outkast, and Wyclef Jean.

For 2004–05, the special moved to Times Square and was renamed New Year's Eve: Live from Times Square, with Seacrest remaining as host; it featured performances by the rock bands Evanescence and Hoobastank, as well as the world premiere of Usher's "mini-movie" Rhythm City Volume One: Caught Up.

In 2005, Seacrest moved to New Year's Rockin' Eve on ABC to succeed Dick Clark as host; Clark had missed the previous year's edition due to a stroke in December 2004, and retired to a co-hosting role due to a lingering speech impediment. Regis Philbin—who had guest hosted New Year's Rockin' Eve 2005 in place of Clark—would jump to Fox to host its 2005–06 special, rechristened New Year's Eve Live.

The 2006–07 edition would be hosted by Cat Deeley of So You Think You Can Dance, featuring guest appearances by its season 2 finalists Benji Schwimmer and Heidi Groskreutz, and performances by Daughtry (led by Chris Daughtry of American Idol season 5) and Toni Braxton. Fox's head of alternative entertainment Mike Darnell informed her of the gig before she flew back to England for Christmas; after Deeley told him that her mother would "crucify" her if she wasn't home for Christmas, Darnell told her that "if I have to fly her here and she has to be on TV too, that's what's going to happen." Deeley hosted the special again for 2007–08, with Spike Feresten (Talkshow with Spike Feresten) joining as a correspondent.

=== Return to Las Vegas ===
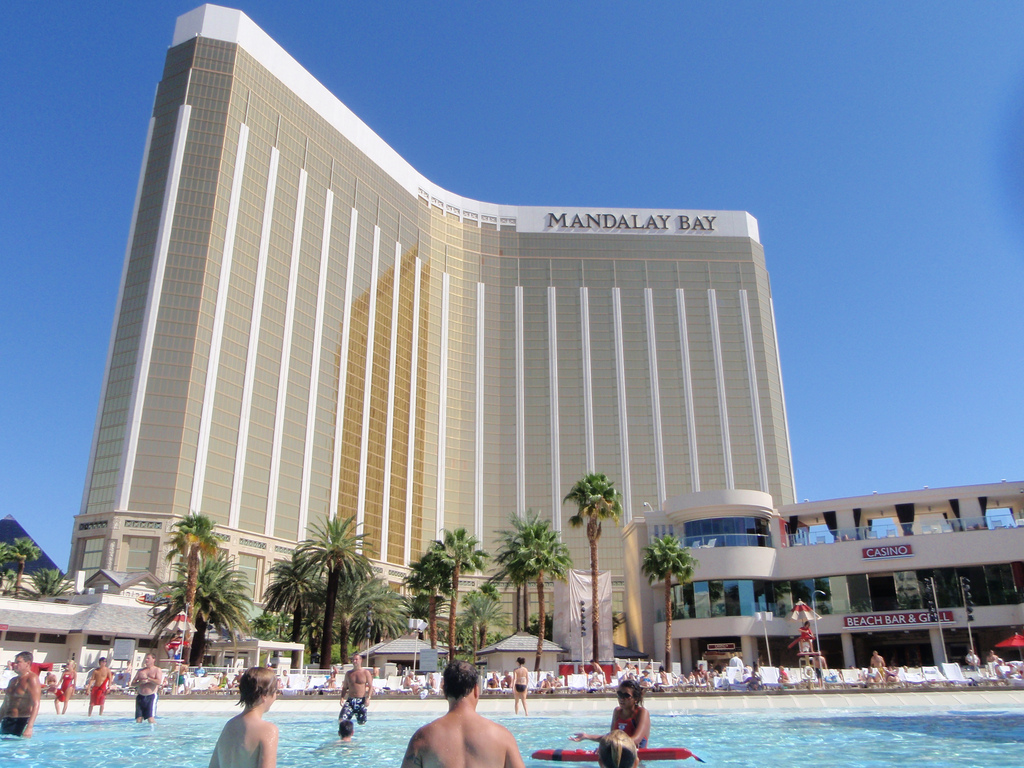
The Mandalay Bay hosted Fox's New Year's Eve Live from 2009 to 2013.

Beginning with the 2008–09 edition, New Year's Eve Live began to once again be hosted from Las Vegas with coverage of Times Square, with a different host annually. Each edition from 2009 onward emanated from the Mandalay Bay resort and casino.

- The 2008–09 edition was hosted by Spike Feresten and Mark Thompson; it featured performances by Daughtry, American Idol season 7 winner David Cook, Lynyrd Skynyrd, and Scott Weiland. It also featured a motorcycle jump by Robbie Knievel over the volcano outside The Mirage, and segments profiling Cirque du Soleil's Las Vegas shows Criss Angel Believe, Love, and Zumanity.
- The 2009–10 edition was hosted by Carmen Electra from Mandalay Bay Beach, and was titled Billboard's New Year's Eve Live as a tie-in with the Billboard Music Awards. It featured countdowns of the top entertainment and music moments of the year, and of the top highlights of the Billboard Music Awards. Performers included Kris Allen and Allison Iraheta of American Idol season 8, and Sean Kingston.
- The 2010–11 edition was hosted by Nancy O'Dell; performers included American Idol season 7 runner-up David Archuleta, Plain White T's, and Travie McCoy.
- The 2011–12 edition was hosted by Rodney Carrington, joined by Rick Harrison and Chumlee of Pawn Stars. Titled American Country New Year's Eve Live as a tie-in with Fox's American Country Awards, its lineup focused specifically on country music, with performances by Rodney Atkins, American Idol season 10 runner-up Lauren Alaina, Eli Young Band, Joe Nichols, and Toby Keith.
- The 2012–13 edition was hosted by Marlon Wayans; performers included Carmen Electra, Lifehouse, and The X Factor season 2 winner Tate Stevens.
- The 2013–14 edition was hosted by Mario Lopez (The X Factor) from the Light nightclub at Mandalay Bay; it featured performances by J. Cole, Krewella, New Politics, and Panic! at the Disco.

== Pitbull's New Year's Revolution ==
Pitbull's New Year's Revolution
- Created by: Pitbull
- Presented by: Snoop Dogg; Queen Latifah
- Country of origin: United States
- Original language: English
- No. of episodes: 3

Production
- Executive producer: Pitbull
- Producer: John Hamlin
- Production locations: Bayfront Park, Miami
- Production companies: Endemol Shine North America; Honey I'm Home; Switched On Entertainment

Original release
- Network: Fox
- Release: December 31, 2014 – December 31, 2016

From 2014 to 2015 through 2016–17, Fox broadcast Pitbull's New Year's Revolution, which was created and produced by hip-hop artist Pitbull. It was broadcast from Bayfront Park in Miami, and featured live performances by Pitbull and other musicians (with the 2015–16 and 2016–17 editions having a particular focus on hip-hop and R&B acts).

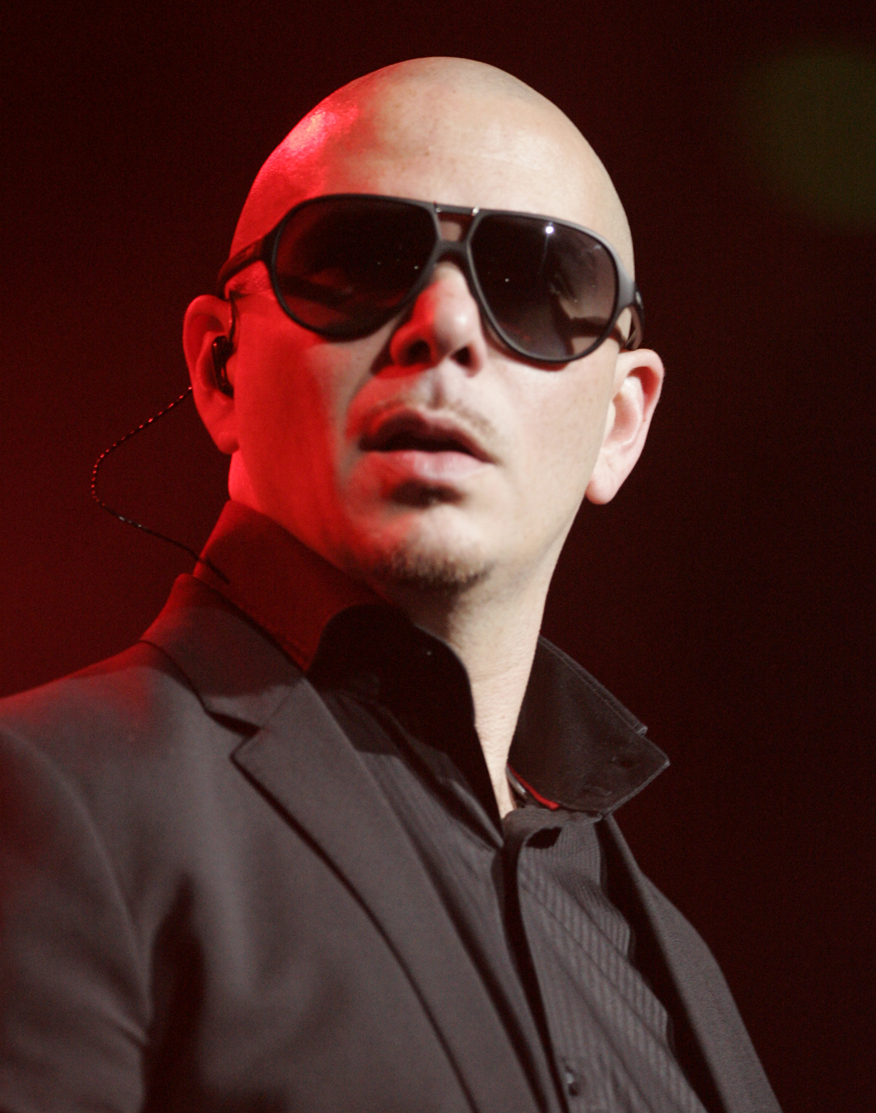
Pitbull in 2012

The new special was announced in May 2014, and would be co-produced by Endemol North America and Pitbull's production company Honey I'm Home; the studio had signed an exclusive development deal with Pitbull in January 2014. New Year's Revolution marked the first production of a new Endemol division, Endemol Live; Endemol North America co-CEO Charlie Corwin explained that the new division "reflects a larger plan to continue to evolve Endemol North America into a studio for next-generation success and profitability". Fellow CEO Cris Abrego felt that New Year's Revolution would be "unlike anything else you have ever seen on television" and would mark "the start of a new tradition".

In October 2014, it was revealed that Pitbull had been negotiating for the use of Bayfront Park as part of the special's associated festivities. Mayor of Miami Tomás Regalado supported the proposed events due to the amount of publicity it would bring the city, arguing that it would be "extraordinary" to "have three hours on live television, on [Fox], competing with Times Square. The only difference is they have a ball and we have an orange." Portions of the special were taped at the Thompson Hotel on Miami Beach, including performances by The Band Perry, Becky G, Enrique Iglesias, Fall Out Boy, and Fifth Harmony. The inaugural broadcast culminated with a free, live concert by Pitbull at Bayfront Park leading into the new year.

In October 2015, Fox confirmed that Pitbull's New Year's Revolution would return for 2015–16. The public festivities for the 2016 edition were expanded to include a two-day food festival, the Norwegian Worldwide Food & Wine Party, whose ticketed attendees were given priority seating for the concert at the Klipsch Amphitheatre at Bayfront Park. Terry Crews and Wendy Williams co-hosted the special, which featured appearances by Austin Mahone, Camila Cabello, Earth, Wind & Fire, Jussie Smollett, Sean Combs, Shawn Mendes, Prince Royce, R. City, Pia Mia, and Timbaland with Yazz of Fox series Empire. John Hamlin, the former senior vice president of music events and talent at CMT, was also brought on to serve as a producer for the special under his Switched On Entertainment banner. Hamlin promised that unlike the 2015 edition, the 2016 edition would be entirely live with no prerecorded content.

The 2016–17 edition was co-hosted by Queen Latifah and Snoop Dogg, and featured Biz Markie, Coolio, Naughty by Nature, Rob Base, Salt-N-Pepa, Tone Loc, and Young MC. Unlike previous editions, the 2017 edition did not include a primetime segment (Fox scheduled drama encores in the timeslot instead).

The Fox telecast was not renewed for 2017–18; Pitbull has continued to organize New Year's Eve concerts at Bayfront Park in the years that followed. He also appeared during Univision's Spanish-language New Year's Eve special ¡Feliz 2018!.

=== Broadcast ===
In 2015 and 2016, similarly to other New Year's specials across the major networks, the special was divided into two segments, with the first two-hour segment airing during Fox's primetime programming from 8:00 p.m. to 10:00 p.m. ET/PT, followed by a 90-minute segment beginning at 11:00 p.m. ET/PT following late local programming and/or newscasts to cover the countdown to midnight. The 2017 edition only contained the late-night portion.

Viewership for the inaugural edition of Pitbull's New Year's Revolution was on par with Fox's previous New Year's specials; Nielsen ratings for the late-night segment recorded a 2.6 household rating, and a 2.2 rating in the 18–49 demographic (improving over the 2.1 of New Year's Eve Live 2014), putting it behind NBC's New Year's Eve with Carson Daly (4.9, 3.1 among 18–49s) and ABC's New Year's Rockin' Eve (10.7, 7.3 among 18–49s).

The 2016 edition of Pitbull's New Year's Revolution brought notable gains; the primetime portion recorded 2.6 million viewers and a 29% increase among viewers 18 to 49, while the late-night portion recorded a 3.1 household rating and a 2.7 rating among 18–49s. Ratings were down in 2017, with a 2.6 household rating and a 2.4 rating among 18–49s.

== New Year's Eve with Steve Harvey ==
Fox's New Year's Eve with Steve Harvey
- Presented by: Steve Harvey
- Country of origin: United States
- Original language: English
- No. of episodes: 3

Production
- Executive producers: Guy Carrington; Katy Mullan; Mike Antinoro; Dave Chamberlin; Orly Anderson
- Production locations: Times Square, New York City
- Production companies: Endeavor Content; Done and Dusted; Film 45

Original release
- Network: Fox
- Release: December 31, 2017 – December 31, 2019

On November 16, 2017, Fox announced that it would air a new special hosted by television personality Steve Harvey, known as New Year's Eve with Steve Harvey: Live from Times Square, for New Year's Eve 2018. The new special would be produced by IMG, who was also the producer of Harvey's eponymous syndicated talk show.

The inaugural edition featured performances by the Backstreet Boys, Celine Dion, Flo Rida, as well as Neil Diamond—who led a live performance of "Sweet Caroline" in Times Square. Keven Undergaro and Maria Menounos were also married on-air in a ceremony officiated by Harvey (who was only ordained two days before the event).

The special was renewed for 2018–19, with Menounos added as co-host, performances by Florence + the Machine, Jason Aldean, Juanes, Sting, Robin Thicke, and Why Don't We, and appearances by Ken Jeong (The Masked Singer), Kenan Thompson, and the Fox NFL Sunday panel.

The 2019–20 edition included performances by the Backstreet Boys, The Chainsmokers, Florida Georgia Line, The Killers, LL Cool J and Z-Trip, The Lumineers, Tyga, and the Village People (which included an attempt in Times Square to set a world record for the largest "Y.M.C.A." dance). It also featured appearances by Will Arnett (Lego Masters), Jenna Dewan (The Resident), Rob Gronkowski (Fox NFL Thursday; who spiked a Lego bust of Harvey's face on-stage), and Gordon Ramsay. To promote Friday Night SmackDown on Fox, WWE wrestlers Elias, R-Truth and Mojo Rawley made appearances in Times Square (with the latter two briefly exchanging the 24/7 Championship), and the special included a match between Roman Reigns and Dolph Ziggler (filmed after the live SmackDown broadcast in Detroit the preceding Friday).

=== Broadcast ===
As before, the special was divided into primetime and late-night segments. Facing one fewer competitor over 2017 (New Year's Eve with Carson Daly was placed on hiatus by NBC, as it tentatively scheduled Sunday Night Football for the final game of the 2017 NFL regular season. However, the NFL ultimately forwent a primetime game), Fox finished in second place for the night behind New Year's Rockin' Eve, with a total of 8.5 million viewers for its primetime coverage (a 98% increase over last year's Pitbull's New Year's Revolution), and a 2.9 rating among 18-49s, making it Fox's most-watched New Year's special to date.

With NBC's special returning for 2019, ratings for the late-night portion of Fox's special fell from 4.9 to 3.8 in metered markets.

The primetime portion of the 2020 edition drew 2.8 million viewers.

== New Year's Eve Toast & Roast ==
Fox's New Year's Eve Toast & Roast
- Presented by: Ken Jeong; Joel McHale
- Country of origin: United States
- Original language: English

Production
- Executive producer: Carol Donovan
- Production location: Los Angeles
- Production company: Fox Alternative Entertainment

Original release
- Network: Fox
- Release: December 31, 2020 – December 31, 2021

On December 2, 2020, Fox announced that it would air a new special hosted by comedians and The Masked Singer panelists Ken Jeong and Joel McHale, Fox's New Year's Eve Toast & Roast. It was produced from Los Angeles and featured a retrospective honoring "those that helped to make the world a better place this past year." The special was produced by Fox Alternative Entertainment, and divided into primetime and late-night segments.

It featured performances by David Guetta and Raye, Gabby Barrett, Mayim Bialik and Cheyenne Jackson (Call Me Kat), Gloria Estefan, Elvis Francois, Green Day, Jane Krakowski and Randy Jackson (Name That Tune), John Legend, Ava Max, and LeAnn Rimes. Kelly Osbourne reported from Times Square, and Craig Robinson and the Nasty Delicious served as house band. In average primetime viewership, Fox finished in fourth place for the night with 2 million viewers (a 25% decline over 2020), behind NBC's New Year's Eve, CBS drama reruns, and New Year's Rockin' Eve.

For 2021–22, Fox originally announced that Toast & Roast would return, with performances by Billy Idol, Imagine Dragons, Maroon 5, Pink, and Trace Adkins (WWE SmackDown was pre-empted to FS1, airing a prerecorded year-in-review special). On December 21, 2021, however, Fox announced that due to COVID-19 pandemic-related concerns—especially involving the widespread surge of the Omicron variant in New York City—that the special had been cancelled. Reruns of the Beat Shazam, Gordon Ramsay's Road Trip, and I Can See Your Voice holiday specials aired in its place; thus, Fox did not provide any national New Year's programming on broadcast television for the first time since 1991, an absence that would continue thereafter.
