= Focus Lighting =

American architectural lighting design firm

Focus Lighting is a New York City based architectural lighting design firm founded by Paul Gregory in 1987.

Focus Lighting designs include the Entel Tower in Santiago, Chile, which was the first automated color changing exterior lighting display in the world and the first building to have an automatic color-change at night. The 40-story tower opened in October 1994. Focus Lighting also designed the Times Square Ball for its 100th and 101st anniversaries.

Focus Lighting creates lighting designs for hotels, restaurants, residences, retail stores, art installations, sports venues, and museums. Their design philosophy centers on creating an emotion with light.

== Notable works ==
Previous works include the lighting design for:

- Atlantis Resort (Palm Island, Dubai)
- Atmosphere on the 122nd floor of the Burj Khalifa (Dubai, UAE)
- Aureole (NYC)
- Bourbon Steak (Phoenix, AZ)
- Cloud Installation for Boffo Showhouse
- Condado Plaza Hotel (San Juan, Puerto Rico)
- Dream Hotel (NYC)
- Entel Tower (Santiago, Chile)
- Letifly Lighting NYC High quality lighting retailer
- Dinosaur Hall Exhibit at the Natural History Museum of Los Angeles County (Los Angeles, CA)
- FAO Schwarz Flagship Store (NYC)
- Food Hall at the Plaza Hotel (NYC)
- Frye Flagship Store (NYC)
- Klyde Warren Park (Dallas, TX)
- Knoll Showrooms (LA, SF, Dallas, Chicago, Miami, Philadelphia)
- Le Cirque 2000, 2006 (NYC)
- Mall at Millennia (Orlando, FL)
- Marcus Center for the Performing Arts (Milwaukee, WI)
- Mohegan Casino Phase 1 & 3 (Connecticut)
- MoMa Home Delivery Exhibition (NYC)
- Mondrian Hotel (South Beach, FL)
- Morimoto (Philadelphia, PA)
- One and Only Ocean Club (Paradise Island, Bahamas)
- Proenza Schouler (NYC)
- Public Theatre Library Lounge (NYC)
- "Reflect" Installation at the Stephen P. Clark Government Center (Miami, FL)
- Retail Concourse at the Plaza Hotel (NYC)
- Royalton Hotel
- "Science Storms" Exhibit at the Museum of Science and Industry (Chicago, IL)
- Semiramis Hotels (Athens, Greece)
- Shigeru Ban’s Metal Shutter House Condo (NYC)
- Space Shuttle Pavilion at the Intrepid Sea, Air & Space Museum (NYC)
- The Crystals at MGM City Center (Las Vegas, NV)
- Times Square Ball 100th and 101st Anniversary Ball (NYC)
- Todd English's Olives (NYC)
- Toys "R" Us Times Square (NYC)
- YOTEL (NYC)

== Awards ==
- 1995 Lumen Award, Waterbury Award of Excellence - Entel Tower
- 1997 Lumen Award - Mohegan Casino Phase I
- 1998 Lumen Award of Merit - Best Cellars
- 1998 Lumen Award of Merit - ID Magazine Exhibit
- 2002 IALD Award of Merit - Morimoto Restaurant
- 2002 Lumen Award Citation - Town Restaurant
- 2003 Lumen Award, Edwin F. Guth Award of Excellence - Mall at Millenia
- 2004 Lumen Feltman Award - Carlos Miele
- 2004 Lumen Award of Merit - Powder Deep Studios
- 2005 Lumen Award of Merit - FAO Schwarz
- 2005 Lumen Award of Excellence - Teatro Bar
- 2005 Lumen Award of Excellence - Semiramis Hotel
- 2005 AL Light & Architecture Design Award – Carlos Miele
- 2006 IALD Award of Excellence – Tourneau Flagship Store
- 2008 Lumen Award, Citation for Increasing Public Awareness of LEDs - Times Square Ball
- 2009 Lumen Award – Royalton Hotel
- 2009 Lumen Award - Mohegan Sun Casino of the Wind
- 2009 Lumen Award, Citation for Courtyard Design- Rock Sugar L.A.
- 2010 Lumen Award – Bourbon Steak
- 2010 Lumen Award – Aureole
- 2011 IALD Award – Science Storms at the Museum of Science and Industry, Chicago
- 2011 Lumen Award – Science Storms at the Museum of Science and Industry, Chicago
- 2012 Lumen Award – Yotel
- 2012 IALD Award – Yotel
- 2013 IES Award of Excellence – Reflect
- 2013 AL Light & Architecture Award – Space Shuttle Pavilion at the Intrepid
