= The Mall at Millenia =

Shopping mall in Orlando, Florida, United States

Coordinates: 28.48538°N 81.431312°W

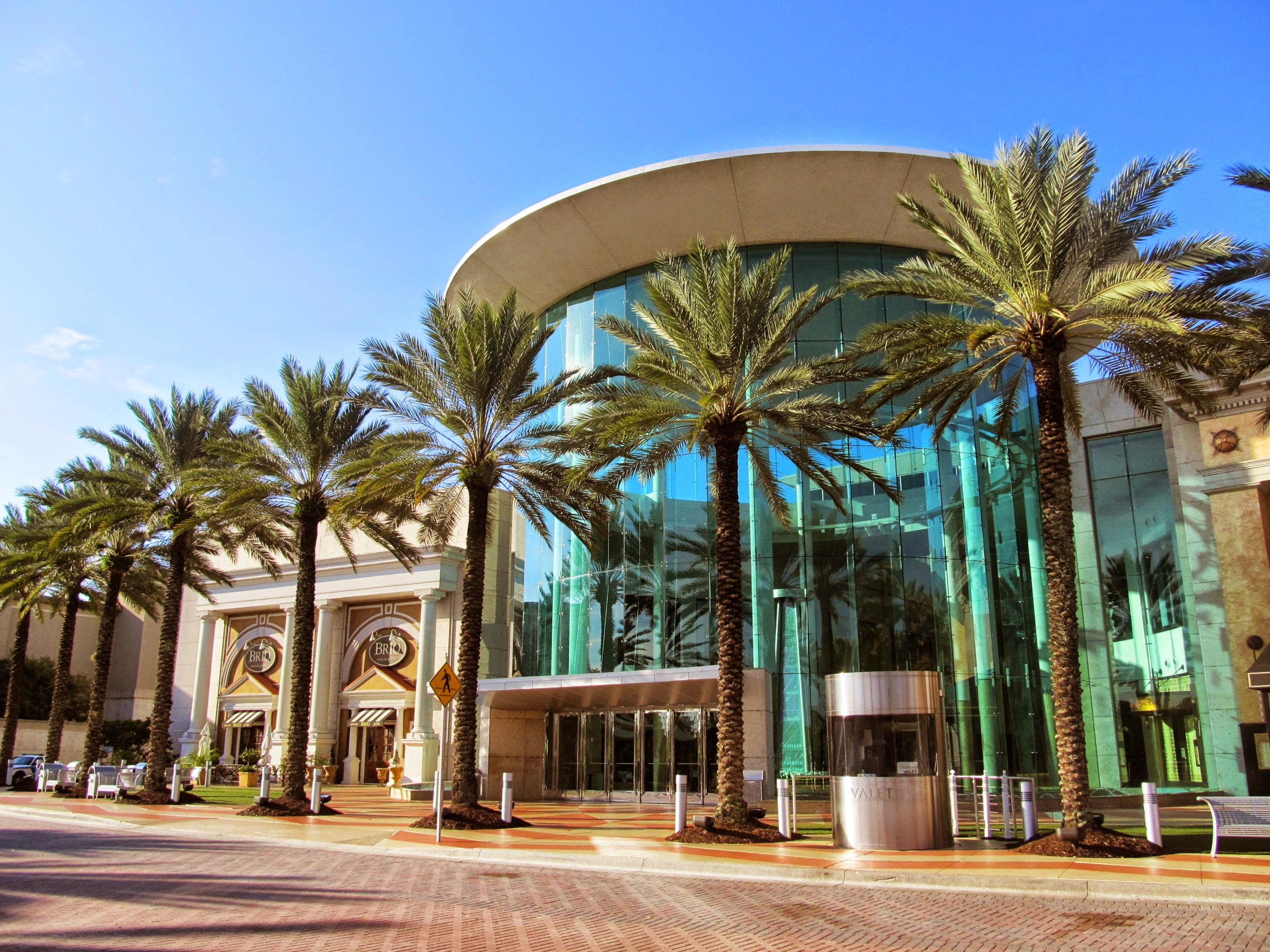
- Entrance to The Mall at Millenia
- Address: 4200 Conroy Road; Orlando, Florida; 32839
- Opened: October 18, 2002; 24 years ago
- Manager: The Forbes Company
- Owner: The Forbes Company (50%); Simon Property Group(50%)
- Architect: JPRA Architects
- Num. of stores: 147
- Num. of anchor tenants: 3
- Floor area: 1,118,000 ft^{2} (103,866 m^{2})
- Floors: 2 (3 in Macy's and Bloomingdale's)
- Parking: Surrounding sectional; free
- Public transit: 24, 40
- Website: www.mallatmillenia.com

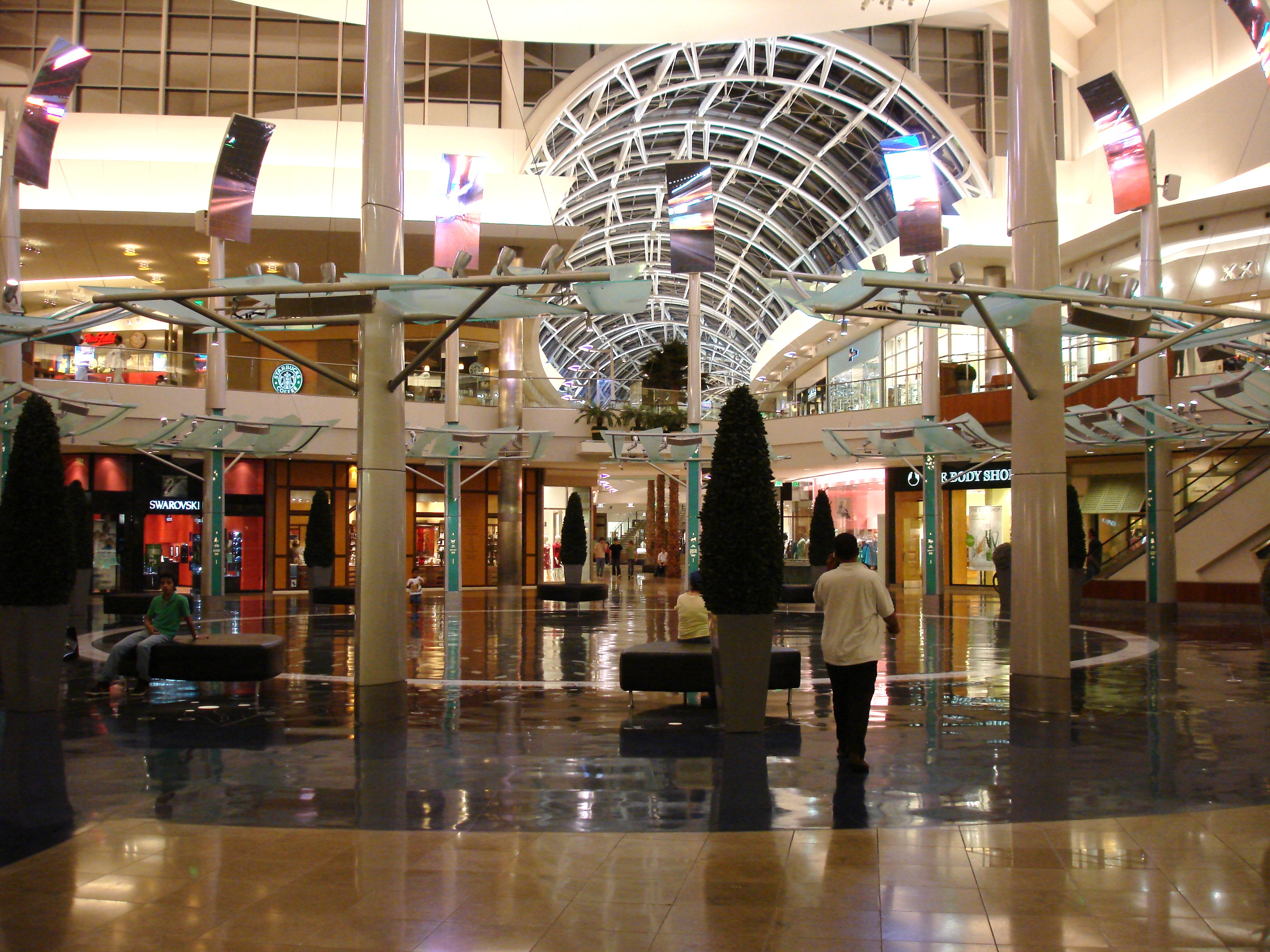
The Mall at Millenia

The Mall at Millenia (also known as Millenia Mall, or simply Millenia) is an indoor shopping mall located in Orlando, Florida. The two-level, 1.12-million-square-foot (104,000 m^{2}) mall is located on Conroy Road near the intersection of Interstate 4 and Florida's Turnpike, as well as the northern end of International Drive. It is the third-largest mall in the Greater Orlando area, behind The Florida Mall and Altamonte Mall.

Opened in 2002, the mall is a major upscale shopping destination in the Orlando area, particularly for wealthy tourists. The mall is anchored by Macy's, Bloomingdale's, and Neiman Marcus; the latter two are the only locations in the Orlando area for their respective chains.

== History ==
The Mall at Millenia opened in 2002 with the current anchors. The mall's Macy's store was the first in Central Florida, and it was also one of only seven Macy's stores in Florida that predated the brand's merger with Burdines.

The Mall is owned by The Forbes Company which also owns The Gardens Mall and the larger Somerset Collection, in Troy, Michigan. The Somerset Collection was used as a model for the Mall at Millenia. Like Somerset, the Mall at Millenia was designed by JPRA Architects and features award-winning lighting by Paul Gregory (Focus Lighting), glass elevators, and fountains. Neither mall has kiosks.

When the mall first opened, there was not much else in the surrounding area. That changed within the first five years and the area surrounding the mall is now locally known as "Millenia." The area, and particularly the mall, has become a major draw for businesses and tourists alike. There are now apartment and condo buildings, single-family homes, and corporate office buildings surrounding the mall.

== Transportation and parking ==
The mall is serviced by Lynx buses (links) 24 and 40. Taxi service and valet parking are available at the main entrance of the mall. Free parking surrounds the mall and is divided into sections with alphanumeric signage. Security vehicles monitor the mall area 24 hours a day.
