= Feliz! (TV program) =

Annual television special

- Presented by: Don Francisco; Raúl de Molina
- Country of origin: United States
- Original language: Spanish
- No. of episodes: 39

Production
- Executive producer: Raúl de Molina
- Production locations: Miami and Mexico City (1986–present); Los Angeles (1986–present); Televisa San Ángel (1986–1999, 2000–2005); Times Square (1986–2021, 2022–present); Chicago (1987–2001); San Juan and Acapulco (2006); Puebla (2016); San Antonio (2016–2020); Las Vegas (2016–2019); Pasadena (2017); Disney California Adventure (2018); Disneyland Resort and Walt Disney World (2011–2019)
- Camera setup: Multi-camera
- Running time: 3 hours (1986–2008, 2009–2010, 2022); 2.5 hours (2008–2009); 5 hours (2010–2014); 7 hours (2014–2016); 12 hours (2016–2017); 6 hours (2017–2020); 4 hours (2021–2022, 2023–present) (with commercials)
- Production company: TelevisaUnivision

Original release
- Network: SIN (1986–87); Univision (1987–present)
- Release: December 31, 1986 – present

¡Feliz! is an annual New Year's Eve television special that airs every New Year's Eve on Univision. In every edition, the show has musical guests, special celebrity appearances, and as always, the sixty second countdown to the next year and as the show progresses, more cities joined in on the festivities in addition to Times Square and Miami, including San Juan and Acapulco ¡¡Feliz 2006!, San Juan and Mexico City ¡¡Feliz 2010!, Anaheim ¡¡Feliz 2011!, Orlando ¡¡Feliz 2015!, San Antonio and Las Vegas ¡¡Feliz 2017!.

== History ==
The Spanish-language networks also joined in on the celebration. SIN/Univision's coverage of the event is called ¡¡Feliz (Year Number)! hosted by Don Francisco from Sábado Gigante. It became the biggest New Year's Eve program on the network since its original run and it currently airs at 10:00pm since 1986. For ¡¡Feliz 2006!, the show starts after Sábado Gigante at a special time of 7:00pm instead of the original 8:00pm time slot to finish 2005. ¡¡Feliz 2009! only covers the New York City at EST portion of the program. For the first time, Univision Communications would broadcast live from Disneyland Resort for ¡¡Feliz 2011!. ¡¡Feliz 2017! was on air for 12 hours, from 3:00pm to 3:00am to finish 2016, including Los Angeles; Hong Kong; Dubai; Baghdad; Cairo; Moscow; Berlin; London; and Rio de Janeiro.

Pitbull participated in the 2018 edition, after his own Pitbull's New Year's Revolution special for Fox was cancelled.

For the 2022 edition, TelevisaUnivision have decided to not broadcast from Times Square and instead host an indoor event from their studios in Miami for unknown reasons, but they would return to Times Square for the 2023 edition.

== Specials ==
No.	Title	Original release date	Viewers (millions)
1	"¡Feliz 1987!"	December 31, 1986	N/A
2	"¡Feliz 1988!"	December 31, 1987	N/A
3	"¡Feliz 1989!"	December 31, 1988	N/A
4	"¡Feliz 1990!"	December 31, 1989	N/A
5	"¡Feliz 1991!"	December 31, 1990	N/A
6	"¡Feliz 1992!"	December 31, 1991	N/A
7	"¡Feliz 1993!"	December 31, 1992	N/A
8	"¡Feliz 1994!"	December 31, 1993	N/A
9	"¡Feliz 1995!"	December 31, 1994	N/A
10	"¡Feliz 1996!"	December 31, 1995	N/A
11	"¡Feliz 1997!"	December 31, 1996	N/A
12	"¡Feliz 1998!"	December 31, 1997	N/A
13	"¡Feliz 1999!"	December 31, 1998	N/A
14	"¡Feliz 2000!"	December 31, 1999	N/A
15	"¡Feliz 2001!"	December 31, 2000	N/A
16	"¡Feliz 2002!"	December 31, 2001	N/A
17	"¡Feliz 20031"	December 31, 2002	N/A
18	"¡Feliz 2004!"	December 31, 2003	N/A
19	"¡Feliz 2005!"	December 31, 2004	N/A
20	"¡Feliz 2006!"	December 31, 2005	N/A
21	"¡Feliz 2007!"	December 31, 2006	N/A
22	"¡Feliz 20081"	December 31, 2007	N/A
23	"¡Feliz 2009!"	December 31, 2008	N/A
24	"¡Feliz 2010!"	December 31, 2009	N/A
25	"¡Feliz 2011!"	December 31, 2010	N/A
26	"¡Feliz 2012!"	December 31, 2011	N/A
27	"¡Feliz 2013!"	December 31, 2012	N/A
28	"¡Feliz 2014!"	December 31, 2013	N/A
29	"¡Feliz 2015!"	December 31, 2014	N/A
30	"¡Feliz 2016!"	December 31, 2015	N/A
31	"¡Feliz 2017!"	December 31, 2016	N/A
32	"¡Feliz 2018!"	December 31, 2017	N/A
33	"¡Feliz 2019!"	December 31, 2018	N/A
34	"¡Feliz 2020!"	December 31, 2019	N/A
35	"¡Feliz 2021!"	December 31, 2020	N/A
36	"¡Feliz 2022!"	December 31, 2021	N/A
37	"¡Feliz 2023!"	December 31, 2022	N/A
38	"¡Feliz 2024!"	December 31, 2023	N/A
39	"¡Feliz 2025!"	December 31, 2024	4.3
40	"¡Feliz 2026!"	December 31, 2025	N/A
Alejandra Espinoza, Raul de Molina, Alan Tacher, Rafael Araneda, Carolina Sandoval, Amara la Negra, In Breef Coral Reef Sculpture Garden and Nursery-Ocean Altas as Deep Sea Divers
