= Times Square Ball =

Time ball in New York City's Times Square

Coordinates: 40.7564°N 73.9865°W

Times Square Ball Drop
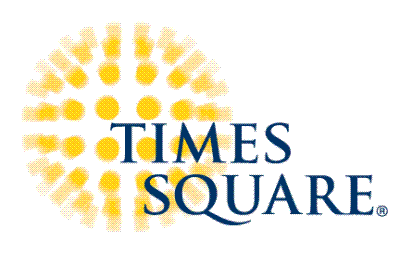

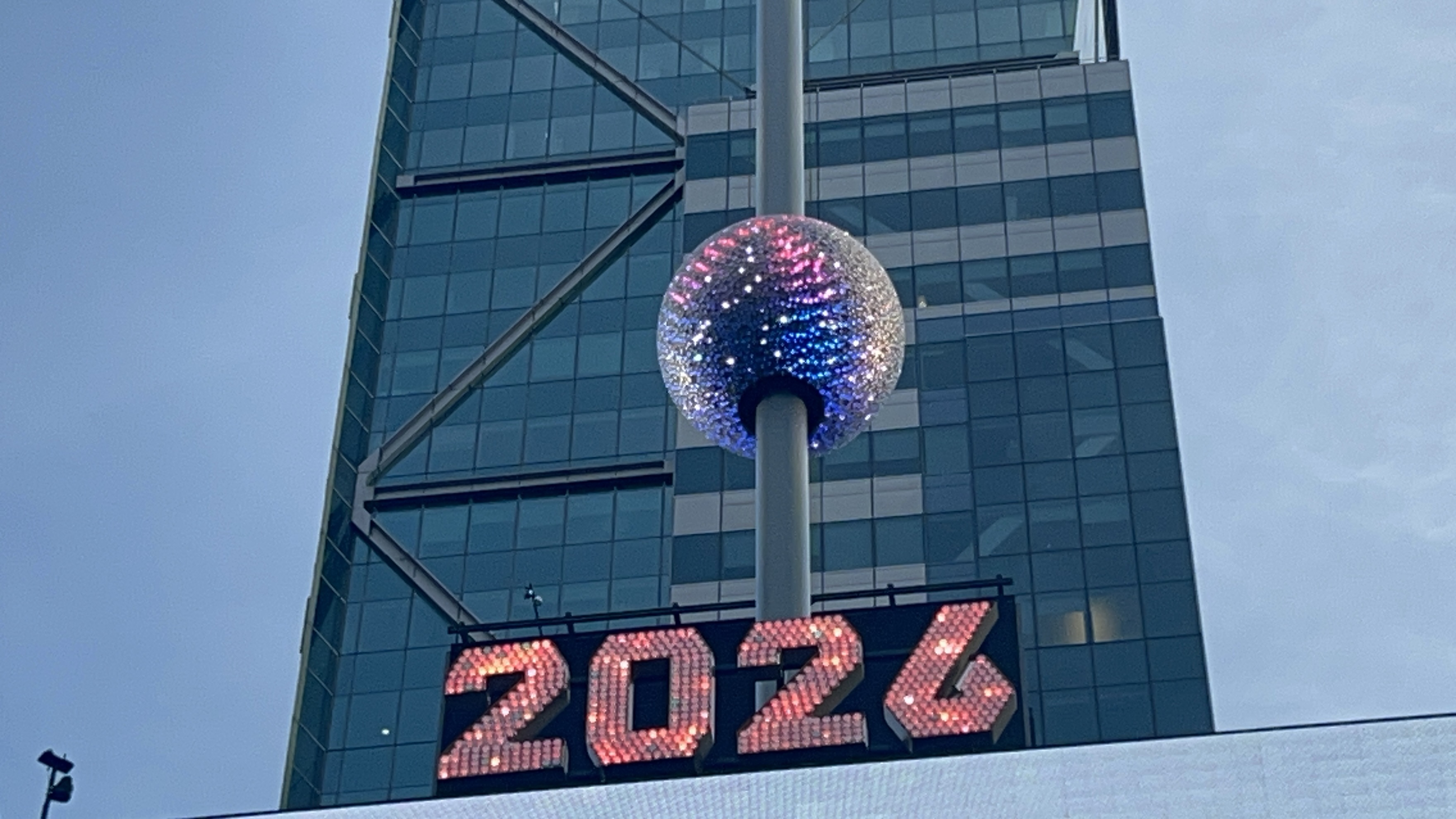
- The current ball atop One Times Square in April 2026
- Genre: New Year's Eve event
- Date: December 31 – January 1
- Begins: December 31, 6:00 p.m.
- Ends: January 1, 12:15 a.m.
- Frequency: Annually
- Locations: Times Square, New York City
- Inaugurated: 1907; 119 years ago
- Founder: Adolph Ochs
- Most recent: 2026
- Next event: 2027
- Organizer: Times Square Alliance; Countdown Entertainment
- Website: timessquareball.net
- 18:00 – 00:15

The Times Square Ball is a time ball located in New York City's Times Square. Located on the roof of One Times Square, the ball is a prominent part of a New Year's Eve celebration in Times Square commonly referred to as the ball drop, where the ball descends down a specially designed flagpole, beginning at 11:59:00 p.m. ET, and resting at 12:00:00 a.m. to signal the start of the new year.

The event was first organized by then-New York Times owner Adolph Ochs, expanding upon New Year's fireworks displays he held at the building since 1904 to promote its status as the Times' headquarters. The ball itself was designed by sign company Artkraft Strauss, and inspired by the time ball at the Western Union Telegraph Building. First held on December 31, 1907, to welcome 1908, the ball drop has been held annually since, except in 1942 and 1943 in observance of wartime blackouts during World War II.

The ball has been updated six times to reflect improvements in lighting technology: the original ball was 5 feet (1.5 m) in diameter, constructed from wood and iron, and illuminated with 100 incandescent light bulbs. By contrast, the sixth iteration of the ball contained over 32,000 LEDs, and the seventh iteration which debuted for 2025–26 is 12.5 feet (3.8 m) in diameter. Since 1999–2000, the ball has typically featured an outer surface consisting of crystal panels manufactured by Waterford Crystal, which contain inscriptions and designs representing a yearly theme; the current ball contains over 5,000 circular panels of varying sizes.

The ball itself has remained atop One Times Square nearly year-round since 2009. As part of a renovation of One Times Square, the ball became accessible to the public in November 2025 as part of a new observation deck attraction, with visitors also able to purchase outgoing crystals from the ball as keepsakes. The prevalence of the event has inspired similar "drops" at other local New Year's Eve events across the country; while some use balls, some instead drop objects that represent local culture or history.

The ball has occasionally been lowered outside of midnight ET on New Year's Eve, including for promotional purposes (including a reported use in 1983 to inaugurate a new Times Square sign, and Toshiba briefly sponsoring a drop for midnight in Japan on the morning of December 31), and the current ball being lowered multiple times per-day for public viewings on One Times Square's observation deck. On July 3 and 4, 2026, the ball was lowered eight times for midnight on Independence Day in each U.S. time zone, as part of a commemoration of the United States Semiquincentennial.

== Events ==
=== Event organization ===
To facilitate the arrival of attendees, Times Square is closed to traffic beginning in the late afternoon on New Year's Eve. The square is then divided into different viewing sections referred to as "pens", into which attendees are directed sequentially upon arrival. Security is strictly enforced by the New York City Police Department (NYPD), even more so since the 2001–02 edition in the wake of the September 11 attacks. Attendees are required to pass through security checkpoints before they are assigned a pen and are prohibited from bringing backpacks or alcohol to the event.

Security was increased further for its 2017–18 edition due to recent incidents such as the truck attack in New York on October 31, and the 2017 Las Vegas shooting; these included additional patrols of Times Square hotels, rooftop patrol squads and counter-snipers, and the installation of reflective markers on buildings to help officers identify the location of elevated shooters. For 2018–19, the NYPD announced its intent to use a camera-equipped quadcopter to augment the over 1,200 fixed cameras monitoring Times Square, but it was left grounded due to inclement weather.

=== Festivities ===
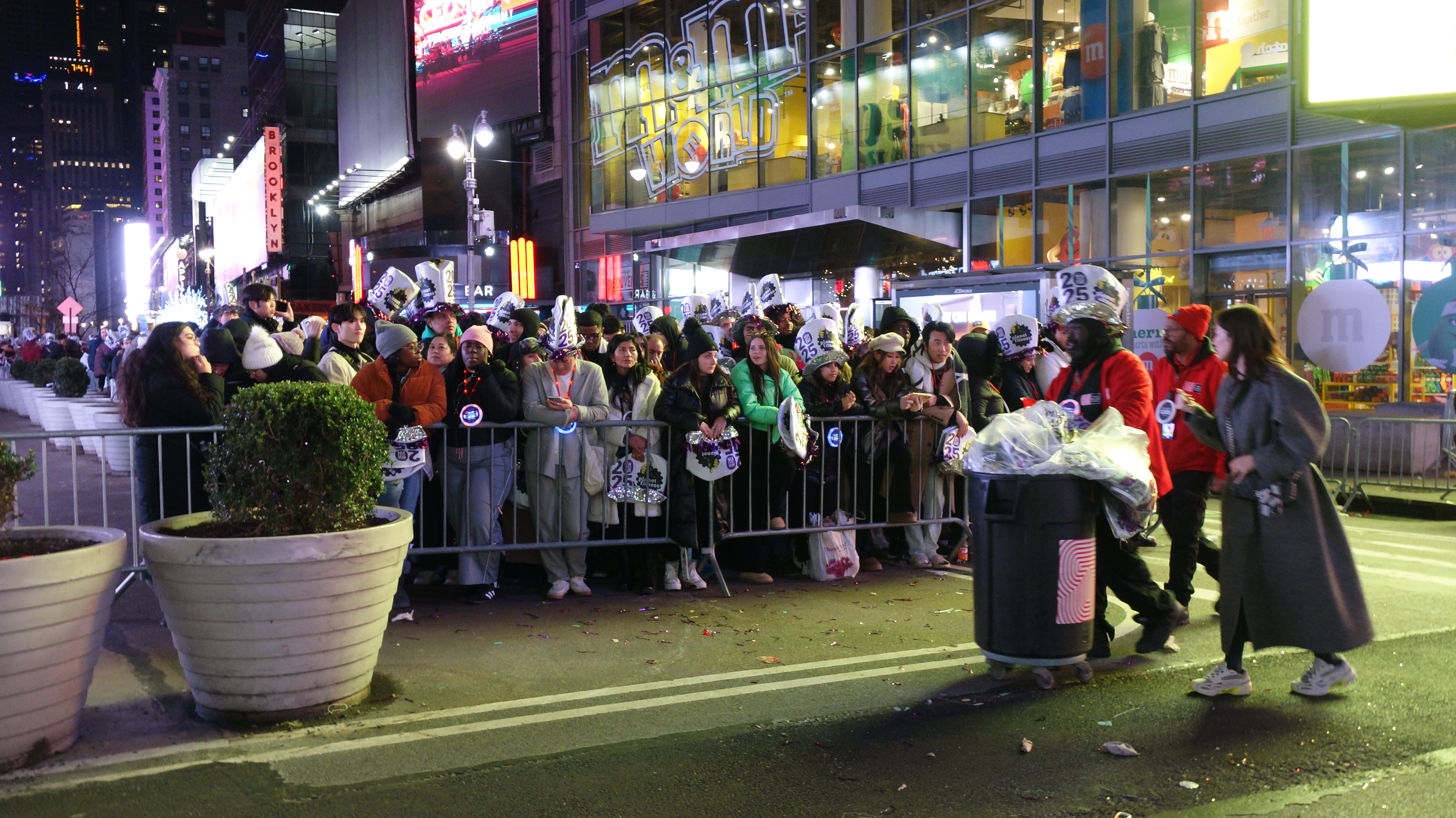
An early-evening crowd in Times Square during the 2024–25 event

Festivities formally begin in the early evening, with an opening ceremony featuring the lighting and raising of the ball at 6:00 p.m. ET. Party favours are distributed to attendees, which have historically included large balloons, hats, and other items branded with the event's corporate sponsors. The lead-up to midnight features a program of entertainment, including musical performances. Some of these performances are organized and televised by New Year's Eve television specials broadcasting from Times Square, such as ABC's New Year's Rockin' Eve —which first began featuring live headliners in 2005–06.

The climax of the festivities is the drop itself, which begins at 11:59:00 p.m. ET. Officially, the drop is activated from a control room within One Times Square, synchronized using an National Institute of Standards and Technology (NIST) time signal received via satellite; a ceremonial button is pressed on-stage by the mayor of New York City and/or invited dignitaries.

At the conclusion of the drop, a numeral sign indicating the new year is illuminated, and a fireworks show is launched from the roof of One Times Square; the fireworks are presently backed by a medley of songs, which have traditionally included "Auld Lang Syne" as performed by Guy Lombardo and His Royal Canadians, and "Theme from New York, New York" as performed by Frank Sinatra, among others.

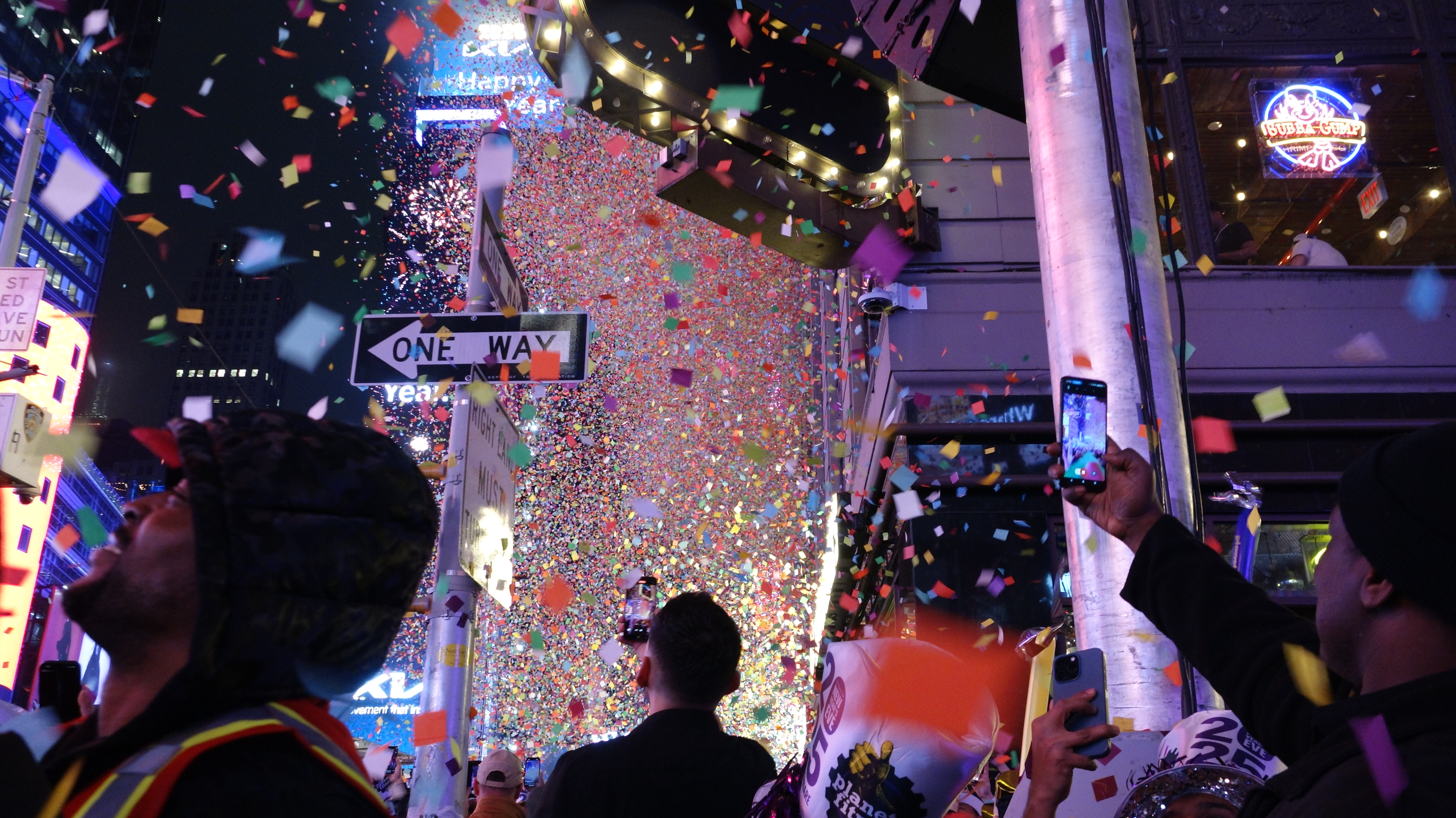
Shortly after midnight on January 1, 2025

At least 3,000 pounds (1,400 kg) of confetti are dropped in Times Square at midnight, overseen since 1992 by Treb Heining—a professional balloon artist who has directed confetti and balloon drops at other major U.S. events such as the presidential nominating conventions. It is thrown by a team of 100 volunteers (referred to internally by Heining as "confetti dispersal engineers") lining the rooftops of eight Times Square buildings. Treb developed the event's signature "blizzard" effect, using larger confetti pieces better-suited to the outdoor environment. Since 2007–08, some of the pieces have been inscribed with messages of hope for the new year, which are submitted through a public "Wishing Wall" erected in Times Square (where visitors can write messages on them directly), and the Times Square website.

==== Special guests ====
===== Ceremonial button =====
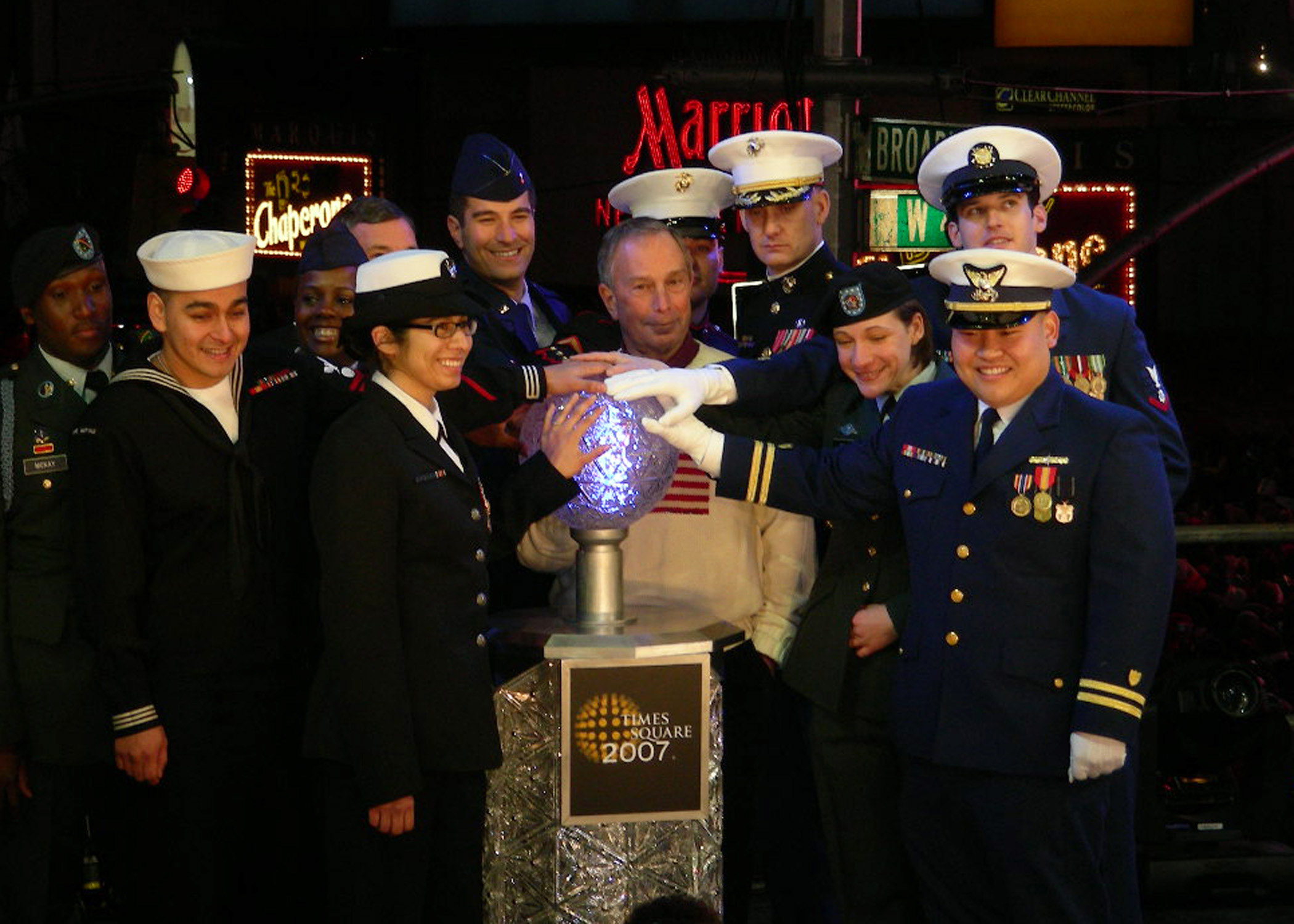
A group of United States Armed Forces members and New York City mayor Michael Bloomberg ceremonially "activating" the drop for 2007

Since 1996, the drop has often been ceremonially "activated" on-stage by one or more dignitaries, accompanied by the current mayor of New York City, who are selected to recognize their community involvement or significance.

- 1996–97: Philanthropist Oseola McCarty
- 1997–98: A group of five winners from a school essay contest honoring the centennial of the City of Greater New York
- 1998–99: Sang Lan, a Chinese gymnast who was injured during the 1998 Goodwill Games and was being rehabilitated in New York City.
- 1999–2000: Mary Ann Hopkins from Doctors Without Borders
- 2000–01: Muhammad Ali
- 2001–02: Judith Nathan, future wife of Mayor Rudy Giuliani.
- 2002–03: Actors Christopher and Dana Reeve
- 2003–04: Shoshana Johnson, the first black female prisoner of war in the military history of the United States, and Cyndi Lauper.
- 2004–05: Secretary of State Colin Powell
- 2005–06: Jazz trumpeter Wynton Marsalis
- 2006–07: A group of ten United States Armed Forces members
- 2007–08: Iraq War veteran and New York City Police Academy valedictorian Karolina Wierzchowska
- 2008–09: Bill and Hillary Clinton
- 2009–10: Twelve students from New York City high schools on the Gold Medal List of the U.S. News & World Report's "America's Best High Schools" rankings.
- 2010–11: United States Army staff sergeant Salvatore Giunta
- 2011–12: Lady Gaga
- 2012–13: The Radio City Rockettes
- 2013–14: Supreme Court associate justice Sonia Sotomayor. Outgoing mayor Michael Bloomberg declined to attend.
- 2014–15: Four representatives from the International Rescue Committee, joined by actor and Latin pop singer Jencarlos Canela
- 2015–16: Hugh Evans, co-founder of Oaktree and Global Citizen
- 2016–17: United Nations Secretary-General Ban Ki-moon; the event was his final act as UN Secretary-General, as António Guterres took office on January 1, 2017.
- 2017–18: Tarana Burke, civil rights activist and founder of the #MeToo movement
- 2018–19: Journalists Karen Attiah, Rebecca Blumenstein, Alisyn Camerota, Vladimir Duthiers, Edward Felsenthal, Lester Holt, Matt Murray, Martha Raddatz, Maria Ressa, Jon Scott, and Karen Toulon, joined by Joel Simon—executive director of the Committee to Protect Journalists.
- 2019–20: New York City high school teachers Jared Fox and Aida Rosenbaum—recipients of the 11th annual Sloan Awards for Excellence in Teaching Science and Mathematics, and four of their students.
- 2020–21: Chirlane McCray, wife of Mayor Bill de Blasio.
- 2021–22: Broadway actors Michael James Scott, Mary Claire King, and Ben Crawford. Due to social distancing measures, the guests did not press the button with the mayor.
- 2022–23: No guest
- 2023–24: Ali Krieger, Kelley O'Hara, and Midge Purce of Gotham FC, the 2023 National Women's Soccer League (NWSL) champions.
- 2024–25: No guest
- 2025–26: United Nations Deputy Secretary-General Amina J. Mohammed.
- 2026–27: TBA

===== "Imagine" performance =====
Starting with the 2005–06 edition of the event, the drop has been directly preceded by the playing of "Imagine" by John Lennon at 11:55 p.m; since 2010–11, the song has been performed live by the headlining artist:

- 2010–11: Taio Cruz
- 2011–12: CeeLo Green (Note: Cee-Lo's performance was criticized by fans for his change of the lyric "And no religion too" to "And all religion's true".)
- 2012–13: Train
- 2013–14: Melissa Etheridge
- 2014–15: O.A.R.
- 2015–16: Jessie J
- 2016–17: Rachel Platten
- 2017–18: Andy Grammer
- 2018–19: Bebe Rexha
- 2019–20: X Ambassadors
- 2020–21: Andra Day
- 2021–22: KT Tunstall
- 2022–23: Chelsea Cutler
- 2023–24: Paul Anka
- 2024–25: Mickey Guyton
- 2025–26: Tones and I
- 2026–27: TBA

==== Mayoral inaugurations ====
Since the practice was established, attending and "activating" the ball drop has occasionally been the final act performed by an outgoing mayor of New York City, as the mayor-elect's term officially begins at midnight on January 1. Two mayors— Michael Bloomberg (2002) and Eric Adams (2022)—have also held their inauguration ceremonies (including the oath of office and inaugural address) on-stage in Times Square following the drop.

In 2014, neither the outgoing or incoming mayor were present: Bloomberg chose to spend New Year's Eve with his family, while Bill de Blasio held his inauguration ceremony the following morning at Gracie Mansion instead.

In 2026, Adams participated in the ball drop in his final act as mayor, while mayor-elect Zohran Mamdani held his inauguration in a separate event at the historic City Hall subway station shortly after midnight.

=== Cleanup ===
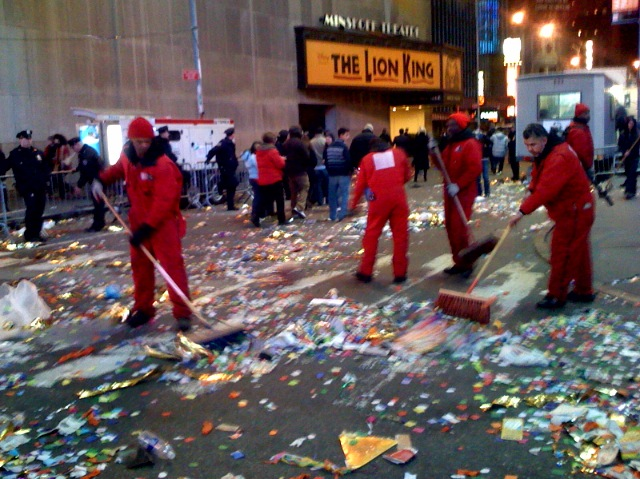
Workers clearing trash from Times Square following the festivities in 2008

After the conclusion of the festivities and the dispersal of attendees, cleanup is performed overnight to remove confetti and other debris from Times Square. When it is re-opened to the public the following morning, few traces of the previous night's celebration remain: following the 2013–14 event, the New York City Department of Sanitation estimated that it had cleared over 50 tons of trash from Times Square in eight hours, using 190 workers from their own crews and the Times Square Alliance.

== History ==
=== Early celebrations, first and second balls (1904–1955) ===
The first New Year's Eve celebration in Times Square was held on December 31, 1904; The New York Times' owner, Adolph Ochs, decided to celebrate the opening of the newspaper's new headquarters, One Times Square, with a midnight fireworks show on the southern roof of the building to welcome 1905. Close to 200,000 people attended the event, displacing traditional celebrations that had normally been held at Trinity Church. However, following several years of fireworks shows, and the city banning the fireworks from being launched directly over the crowd due to safety concerns, Ochs wanted a bigger spectacle at the building. The newspaper's chief electrician, Walter F. Palmer, suggested using a time ball, after seeing one used on the Western Union Telegraph Building near Trinity Church.

Ochs hired sign design company Artkraft Strauss, headed by a Ukrainian metalworker named Jacob Starr, to construct a ball for the celebration; it was built from iron and wood, illuminated by a hundred incandescent light bulbs, weighed 700 pounds (320 kg), and measured 5 feet (1.5 m) in diameter. The ball was hoisted on the building's seventy-foot flagpole with rope by a team of six men. The ball would begin to drop at ten seconds before midnight. Once it hit the roof, the ball completed a circuit that lit five-foot-tall signs on the sides of the building to signal the new year, accompanied by a fireworks display. The first ever "ball drop" was held on December 31, 1907, welcoming the year 1908; to promote the event, waiters of nearby hotels and restaurants wore top hats with battery powered lights spelling out "1908", which they turned on at midnight to match the "1908" signs on the tower.

In 1913, only eight years after it moved to One Times Square, the Times moved its corporate headquarters to 229 West 43rd Street. The Times still maintained ownership of the tower, however, and Ochs continued to organize future editions of the drop.

The original ball was replaced with a new design after the 1919–20 event; it shared the physical dimensions with the first ball, but was now constructed solely from iron—decreasing its weight to 400 pounds (180 kg). The ball drop was placed on hiatus for New Year's Eve 1942–43 and 1943–44 due to wartime lighting restrictions during World War II. Instead, a moment of silence was observed one minute before midnight in Times Square, followed by the sound of church bells being played from sound trucks.

=== The third ball (1955–1999) ===
The second ball was retired after the 1954–55 event, and replaced by a new, third ball for 1955–56; the new ball was 6 feet (1.8 m) in diameter and took the form of a "cage" constructed from aluminum, further reducing its weight to 150 pounds (68 kg).

It was not until 1979 that it became an established practice for the crowd in Times Square to count down the final seconds during the event—a practice that only became common in general on New Year's Eve television specials in the 1960s. That year, the ball's lights were turned off for one minute at 11:58 p.m. prior to the drop, in honor of the victims of the Iran hostage crisis.

Beginning at the 1981–82 event, the ball was redecorated as a "Big Apple" with red-colored lightbulbs and a green "stem", as part of the I Love New York tourism campaign. For the 1987–88 event, organizers acknowledged the addition of a leap second earlier that day (leap seconds are appended at midnight UTC, which is five hours before midnight in New York) by extending the drop to 61 seconds, and including a special one-second light show at 12:00:01 a.m. The original white bulbs returned to the ball for the 1988–89 event, but were replaced by red, white, and blue-colored bulbs for the 1990–91 event to salute the troops of Operation Desert Shield.

The third ball was updated again for the 1995–96 event, now decorated with over 12,000 rhinestones, and adding a computerized lighting system with 180 halogen bulbs and 144 strobe lights. Lighting designer Barry Arnold explained that "something had to be done to make this event more spectacular as we approach the millennium."

The drop itself became computerized through the use of an electric winch synchronized with the National Institute of Standards and Technology's time signal; the first drop with the new system was not without issues, however, as a glitch caused the ball to pause for a short moment halfway through its descent. The following year, John Trowbridge was hired as the drop's new technical director; in 2021, Jeff Strauss told The Wall Street Journal that since his arrival, the drop had never had any technical issues since.

After its 44th use in 1999, the third ball was retired and placed on display at the Atlanta headquarters of Jamestown Group, owners of One Times Square.

Most recent incarnations

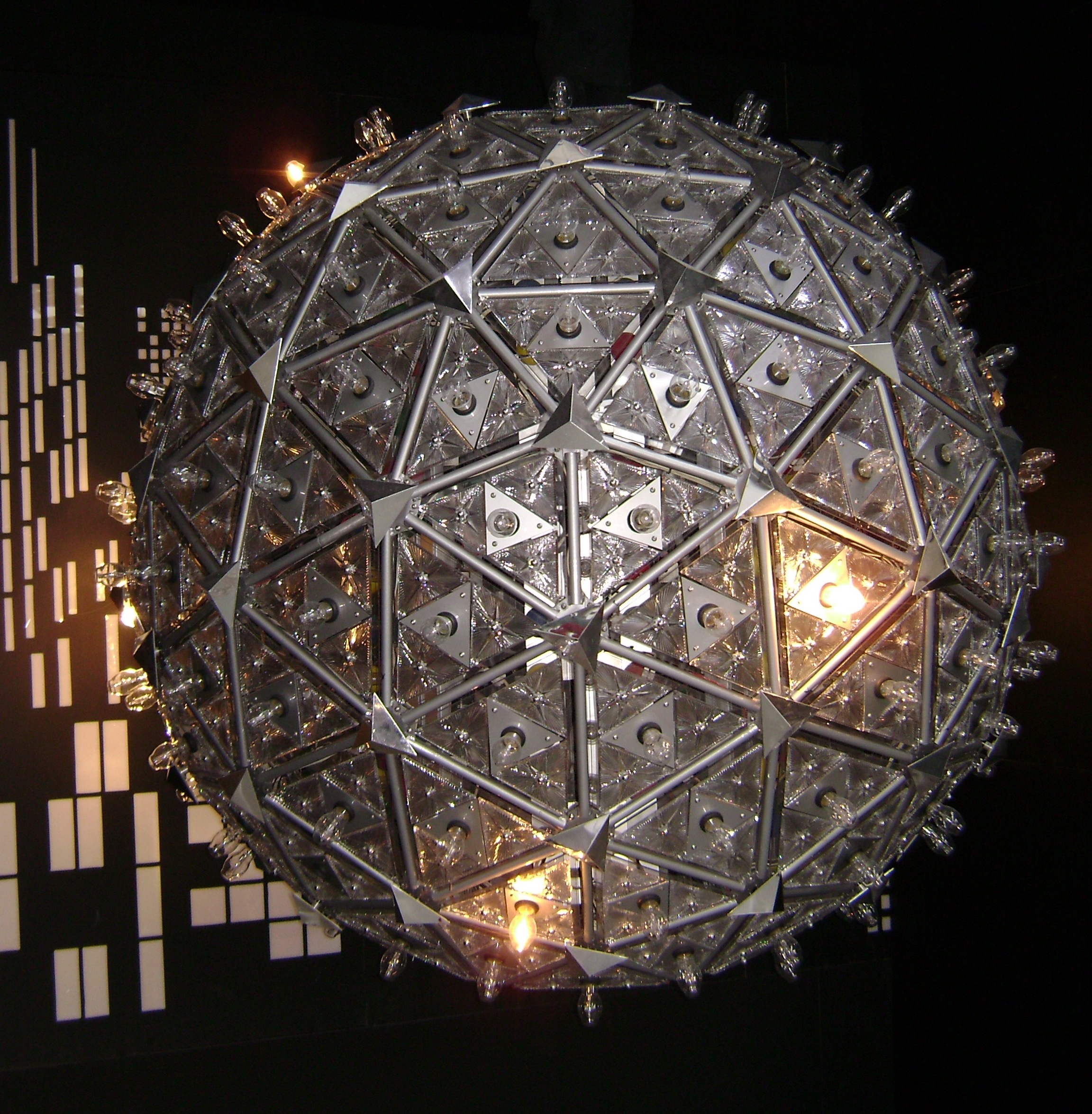
The fourth ball, used from 2000 to 2007

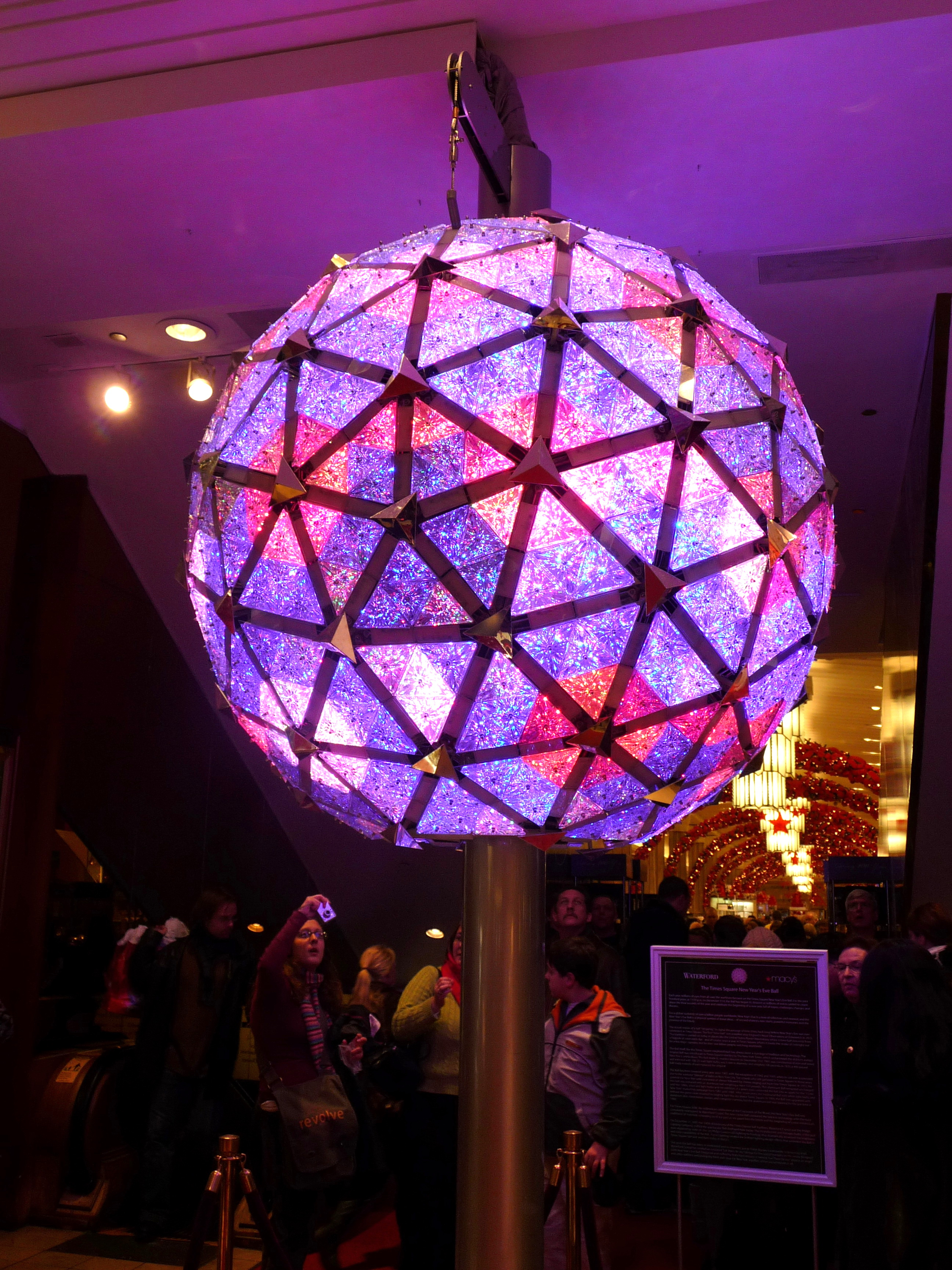
The fifth ball, on display at the Times Square Visitors Center

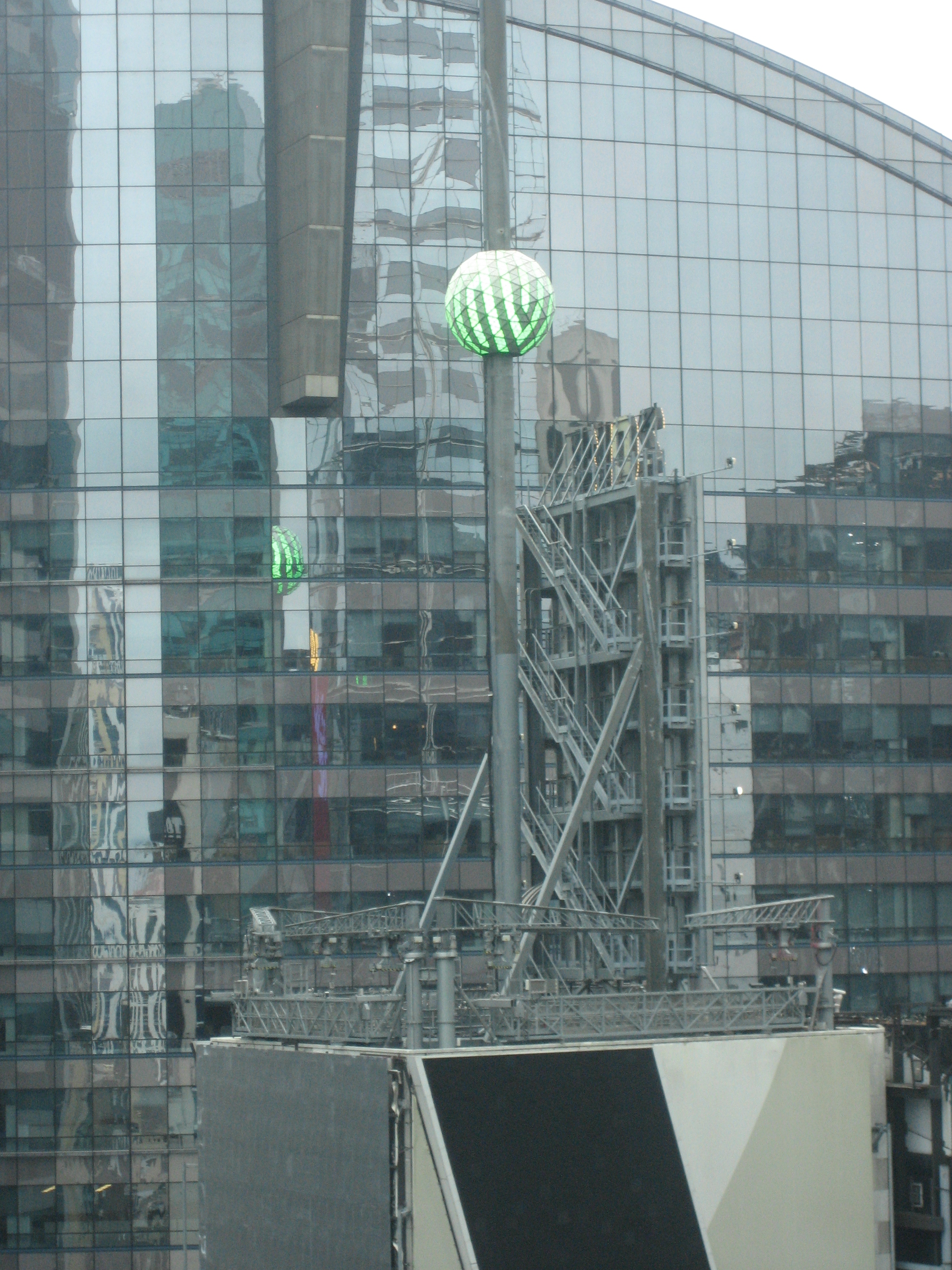
The sixth ball, as seen in 2018; the roof of One Times Square was modified to accommodate the ball as a permanent attraction.

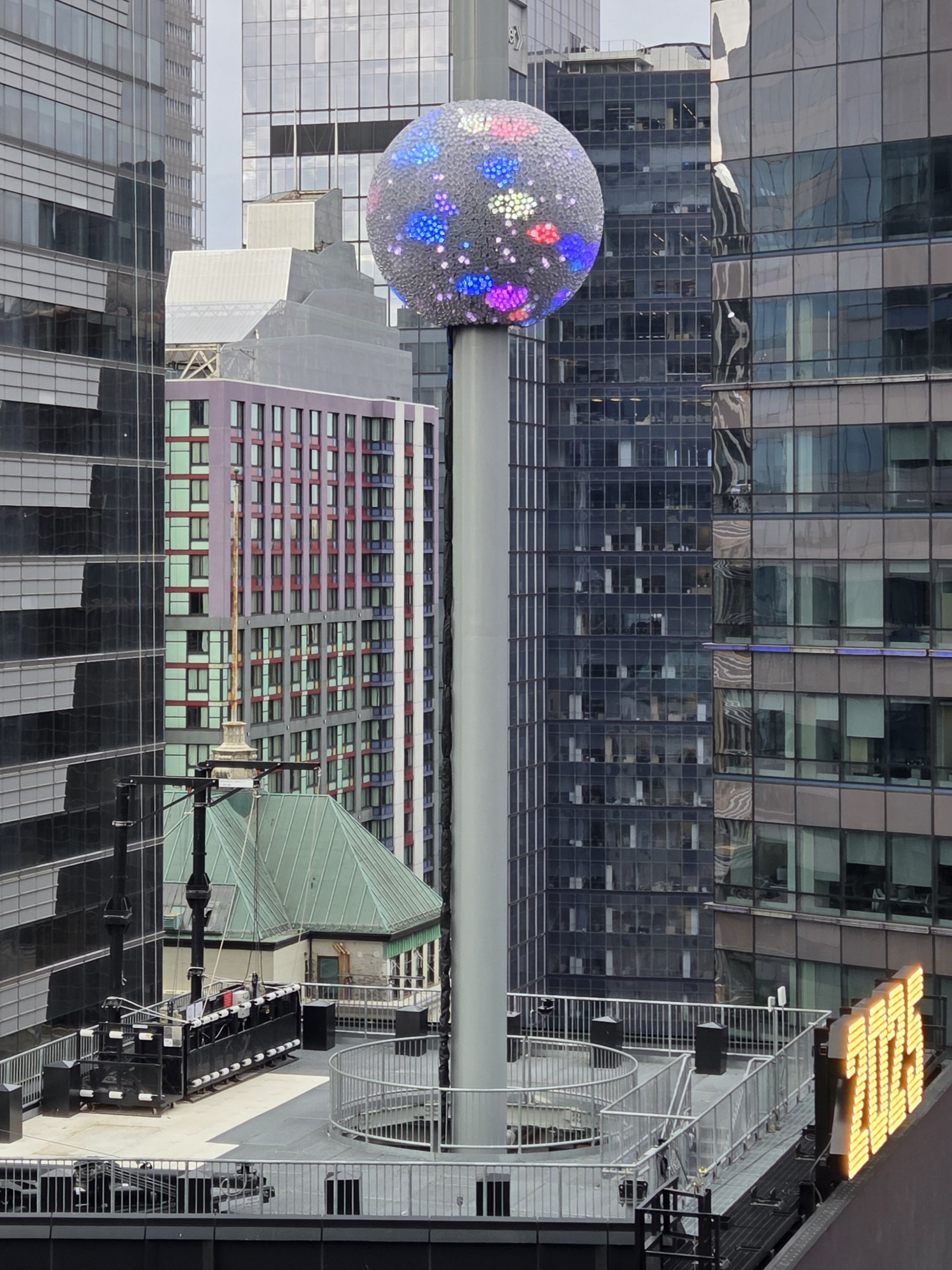
The seventh ball, as seen in November 2025; the roof of One Times Square was revamped as a public observation deck.

=== Year 2000 celebrations and the fourth ball (1999–2007) ===
On December 28, 1998, during a press conference attended by New York City mayor Rudy Giuliani, organizers announced that the third ball would be retired for the arrival of the new millennium, and replaced by a new design constructed by Waterford Crystal. The year 2000 celebrations introduced more prominent sponsorship to the event; companies such as Discover Card, Korbel Champagne, and Panasonic were announced as official sponsors of the festivities in Times Square. The city also announced that actor Ron Silver would lead a committee known as "NYC 2000", which was in charge of organizing events across the city for year 2000 celebrations.

The fourth ball was unveiled on September 23, 1999; measuring 6 feet (1.8 m) in diameter and weighing 1,070 pounds (490 kg), it incorporated a total of over 600 halogen lamps, 504 triangle-shaped Waterford Crystal panels, 96 strobe lights, and spinning, pyramid-shaped mirrors. The ball was constructed at Waterford's factory in Ireland, and was then shipped to New York City, where the lighting system and motorized mirrors were installed at a warehouse in the Bronx. The crystals were inscribed with a design dubbed the "Star of Hope", which contained a circle and seven-pointed star representing the Earth and its continents.

A full day of festivities was held at Times Square to celebrate the arrival of the year 2000, which included concerts and hourly cultural presentations with parades of puppets designed by Michael Curry, representing countries entering the new year at that hour. Organizers expected a total attendance exceeding two million spectators.

The panels were replaced annually with new designs reflecting different "Hope"-related themes, including "Hope for Abundance", "Hope for Courage", "Hope for Unity", "Hope for Wisdom", "Hope for Fellowship", and "Hope for Peace".

==== September 11 attacks ====
The 2001–02 celebrations were held in the aftermath of the September 11 attacks; security was tightened in Times Square, with the event's police presence being doubled to around 7,000 officers, some officers being equipped with metal and radiation detectors, and police snipers stationed on rooftops. The ball featured panels with the theme "Hope for Healing"; they were inscribed with the names of countries and emergency organizations that had taken casualties during the attacks, and the names of the World Trade Center, The Pentagon, and the four flights that were involved in the attacks. Bells were rung across the city when the ball was raised at 6 p.m.

New York Times writer David W. Chen described the festivities as having felt "more like a muted gathering to remember, respect and reflect", citing the security measures, the overall mood of New York residents and visitors (with some reconsidering their attendance of the event, and NYPD officers receiving more questions from tourists about how to get to the World Trade Center site than they did about the ball drop), as well as the cold weather. However, he observed that some had specifically attended the event as a display of patriotism and pride, and the crowd booed whenever footage of Osama bin Laden appeared in newscasts being simulcast on screens in Times Square. Officials projected that the overall attendance was lower than that of the 2000–01 event.

In December 2011, the "Hope for Healing" panels were accepted into the permanent collection of the National September 11 Memorial & Museum.

=== The fifth and sixth balls (2007–2025) ===
To mark the 100th anniversary of the first ball drop, a new fifth design debuted for the 2007–08 event. The new ball was 6 feet (1.8 m), in diameter, weighed 1,212 pounds (550 kg), and contained 672 triangular Waterford Crystal panels. The ball was illuminated by 9,576 Philips LED lamps with 24-bit color, and featured computerized lighting patterns developed by the New York City-based Focus Lighting. Organizers stated that the new ball was also more energy-efficient, and consumed an equivalent amount of electricity to 10 toasters.

The fifth ball was only used once, and was placed on display at the Times Square Visitors Center afterward. For 2008–09, a sixth ball was introduced; it was a larger version of the fifth ball, taking the form of an icosahedral geodesic sphere with a diameter of 12 feet (3.7 m), and weight of 11,875 pounds (5,386 kg). It contained 2,688 Waterford Crystal panels, and was illuminated by 32,256 LED lamps. The new ball was designed to be weatherproof, as it would now be displayed atop One Times Square nearly year-round following the celebrations.

Yearly themes for the ball's crystal panels continued; from 2008 to 2013, the panels featured a Waterford series known as "World of Celebration", which included "Let There Be Light", "Let There Be Joy", "Let There Be Courage", "Let There Be Love", "Let There Be Friendship", and "Let There Be Peace". In 2014, they were succeeded by a new, 10-year Waterford series known as "Greatest Gifts", which included "Gift of Imagination," "Gift of Fortitude," "Gift of Wonder," "Gift of Kindness," "Gift of Serenity," "Gift of Harmony," "Gift of Goodwill," "Gift of Happiness," "Gift of Wisdom," and "Gift of Love."

For a period during the 2010s, as part of the sponsorship of One Times Square's top-most billboard by Japanese electronics firm Toshiba, a daytime countdown and ball drop was held as a media event at 10:00 a.m. ET to mark midnight Japan Standard Time (JST). The event—held hours prior to the closedown of Times Square for the event proper—was used to appeal to New York City's Japanese community, usually attended by members of Japanese media outlets, and included appearances by representatives in traditional Japanese clothing.

The numerical sign indicating the year (which remains atop the tower along with the ball itself) uses Philips LED lamps. The "14" digits for 2014 used Philips Hue multi-color LED lamps, allowing them to have computerized lighting cues.

==== Modifications due to the COVID-19 pandemic (2020–2022) ====
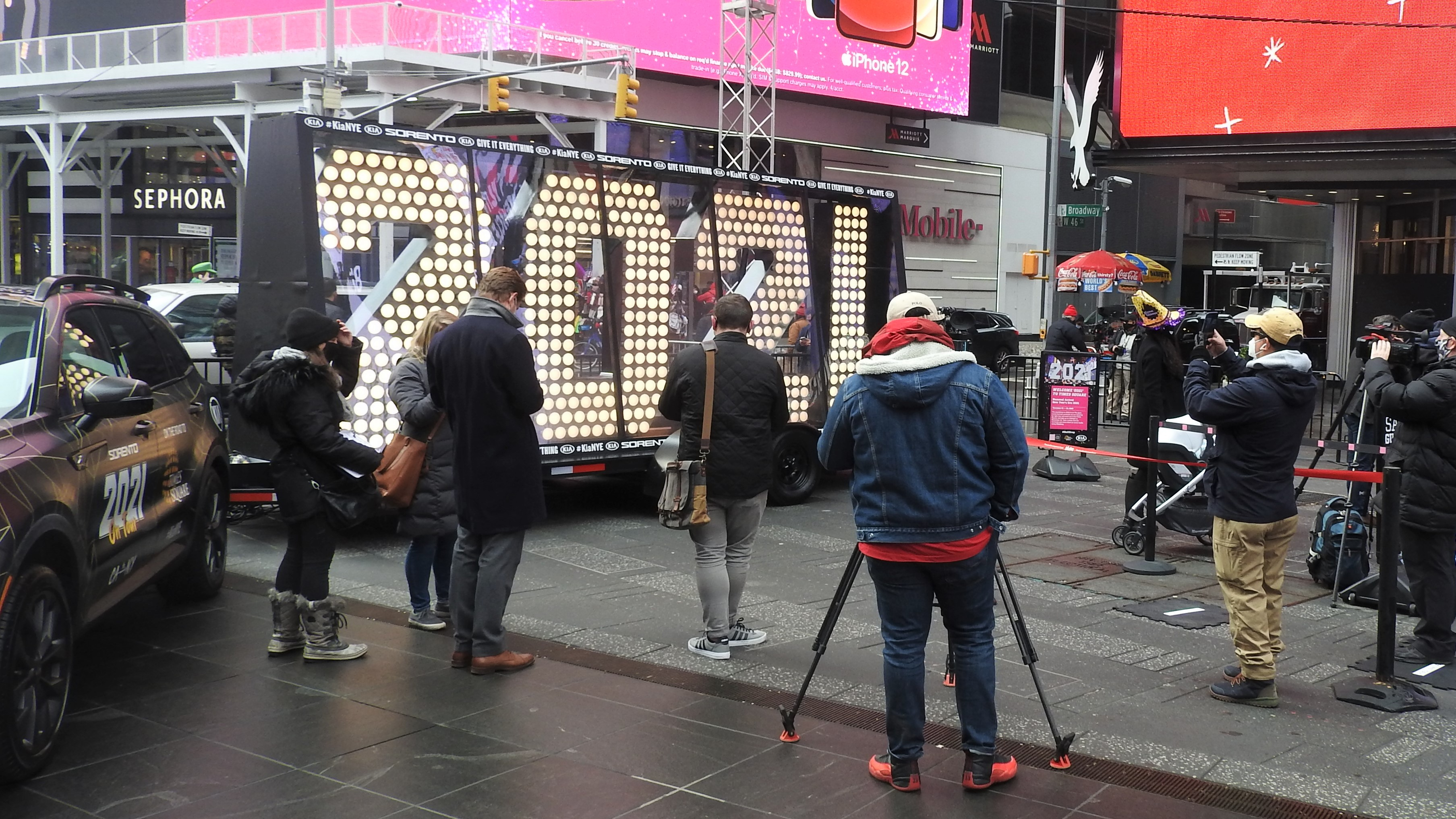
A Kia promotional presentation of the numeral signage for 2021, before it was installed on One Times Square's roof

Due to the COVID-19 pandemic in New York City, the 2020–21 festivities for New Year's Eve 2020 were closed to the general public. Attendance was largely limited to the media, performers, and the invited families of essential workers and first responders from the New York City area ("The Heroes of 2020"). In accordance with New York state health orders, face masks were mandatory, and households were placed within 8 foot (2.4 m) "pens" with social distancing. Times Square Alliance president Tim Tompkins stated that "it feels most appropriate to shine a spotlight on the individuals who are tirelessly leading our nation through hard times with unshakable strength, determination and poise, as well as their families, who deal with their own set of sacrifices." Gloria Gaynor was announced as a special musical guest for the event, where she performed her song "I Will Survive". There was an estimated 80% reduction in NYPD presence at the event in comparison to past years.

A series of new and enhanced virtual and digital components were also developed for the event under the VNYE banner, including a series of streaming esports tournaments being organized by Ultimate Gamer, and a VNYE app which includes a digital recreation of Times Square as a virtual world, where users can play minigames, and watch live streams of New Year's festivities in New York City and elsewhere, and witness a virtual version of the ball drop with augmented reality camera filters.

The automaker Kia became a new sponsor of the festivities beginning that year; as a marketing campaign for its fourth-generation Sorento, Kia held a promotional tour in which the "2021" numerals were driven from Irvine, California (the location of Kia America's headquarters) to New York City using the SUV. Mashable writer Alison Foreman described the "dystopian" scenes of the event acknowledged by viewers on social media, including the large amount of placements by fellow sponsor Planet Fitness (with revellers wearing Planet Fitness-branded clothing and accessories such as hats, and Planet Fitness-branded tube men also occupying the "pens").

During a press briefing on November 15, 2021, Mayor Bill de Blasio implicated that there were plans for New Year's Eve 2021–22 to have public attendance as normal, albeit with safety protocols to be determined and announced to a later date. de Blasio promised "a large, wonderful celebration", with "some clear, smart rules to keep everyone safe".

On November 16, Mayor de Blasio announced that the event for the public attendance was reopened and reinstated that would be held as normal with no restrictions on capacity, although with all attendees over the age of 5 required to present proof of vaccination for COVID-19 (or proof of a recent negative PCR test from within the past 72 hours if covered under an exemption, provided they wear a face mask). Due to the threat of the Omicron variant, unvaccinated attendees were required to wear a face mask. Despite a record number of cases in the city and state tied to Omicron variant (which notably led to the suspension of several Broadway shows due to COVID-19 issues within casts and crew, and the reimplementation of a state mask mandate for indoor public spaces that do not require patrons to be vaccinated), de Blasio stated on December 16 that "if at any point we need to alter the plan, we will", but emphasized that this was an outdoor event with only vaccinated attendees.

On December 20, de Blasio stated that a final decision regarding any changes to the event would be made by Christmas, explaining that "we have what we've done historically for years and years, we have the kind of model we used last year. We are looking at anything that will make this work best." On December 22, de Blasio stated to CNN that the city was "looking to add additional measures to make it even safer"; the previous day, Fox owned-and-operated station WNYW reported that organizers planned to mandate masks and cap the event's capacity, while the Fox network cancelled its planned New Year's Eve special from Times Square citing COVID-19 and Omicron concerns.

On December 23, 2021, it was announced that the official maximum capacity would be reduced to 15,000 (from the approximately 58,000 present before), and that masks would also be mandatory for all attendees (regardless of vaccination status). For the first time, the event's technical director John Trowbridge did not operate the drop in-person due to a COVID-19 infection, and instead directed the event quarantined at a hotel in New Jersey.

==== Post-pandemic, One Times Square renovation (2022–2025) ====
The COVID-19 restrictions ended for the 2022–23 event, returning to a full capacity format for the first time since the 2019–20 event. A major renovation of One Times Square by Jamestown began in 2022, including the construction of a new observation deck, and the conversion of the tower's otherwise-disused floors into a Times Square museum and exhibition space. The ball drop itself was not disrupted by the ongoing construction.

Ahead of the 2023–24 event, renovation was suspended in December 2023 to allow for preparations to begin (including the temporary removal of a crane), and staff wore personal protective equipment while on the roof. Fontainebleau Resorts served as a sponsor, promoting the 70th anniversary of its namesake hotel in Miami Beach, and its newly opened Fontainebleau Las Vegas resort; the lighting patterns on the ball featured bow tie motifs, alluding to the use of bow ties as a logo and visual motif at the two hotels, and the bow tie shape of Times Square itself. That year's "Imagine" performer, Paul Anka, had also been known for his performances in Las Vegas.

For the 2024–25 event, all of the panels on the ball were replaced by a new set designed and manufactured locally by Port Jervis-based Gillinder Glass; Gillinder had originally been approached by organizers to assist in designing an upcoming seventh iteration of the ball, but it was decided that the company would instead produce a set of panels for the existing ball. The panels contained one of two designs, with one featuring an abstract depiction of One Times Square's roof and the ball itself, and another inspired by its then-upcoming wedding chapel Ever. Guests were allowed to purchase the outgoing Waterford Crystal panels and assist in installing the new panels—a test for an upcoming VIP experience that would be offered as part of the new attractions. Organizers also collaborated with Behaviour Interactive on "Times Square Island", a Fortnite Creative world featuring minigames and a live stream of the ball drop.

=== The seventh ball (2025–present) ===
On December 27, 2024, it was announced that the sixth ball would be succeeded by a new, seventh ball beginning in 2025–26, as part of the renovation of One Times Square. Jamestown president Michael Phillips stated that the new ball would have a "completely different design", and would be "dynamic" and "more digitally interactive". It was announced that the existing ball would be relocated to an exhibit in the new One Times Square museum, alongside the third ball (which was relocated from the Jamestown Group headquarters), and a recreation of the first ball (which was constructed using salvaged scrap metal from the renovation).

Details regarding the seventh ball were first revealed in October 2025, with the new design—dubbed the "Constellation Ball"—officially unveiled on November 24, 2025, as part of the ribbon-cutting for the new Times Square observation deck. The seventh ball is its largest iteration to-date, with a diameter of 12.5 feet (3.8 m) and a weight of over 12,300 pounds (5,600 kg). It is covered in 5,280 circular Waterford Crystal panels in three different sizes (roughly doubling the number of panels that were used on the sixth ball), and its lighting system was upgraded to support audio-reactive effects. The numeric signage was similarly upgraded with new multi-colored LED lighting. Upon its opening, the second-floor lobby of the building contained items such as the "25" numeric signage from 2025, as well as the on-stage pedestal and button.

The crystals continue to feature annual themes, this time as part of Waterford's "Infinite Edition" series: the themes are in sets of three to correspond with the three sizes of panels, with the initial themes being "Infinite Joy", "Infinite Light", and "Infinite Beginning". The crystals will be replaced over the course of the year via the "Premium Ball Experience" attraction, a VIP offering which allows guests to access the ball itself, remove and purchase one of the outgoing crystal panels to keep, and install one of next year's crystals. The crystal can be personalized with a Morse code message encoded in a light pattern; this feature is an homage to the telegraphs that were used by the Times' newsroom when it originally occupied the building. The 2026 themes will be "Infinite Life", "Infinite Liberty", and "Infinite Happiness", as an homage to the phrase from the Declaration of Independence.

==== United States semiquincentennial event ====
On December 26, 2025, organizers announced a collaboration with America250 to launch commemorations for the United States Semiquincentennial during the event. Shortly after midnight, the ball was raised back up to showcase a new America250-themed lighting scheme, accompanied by a video presentation narrated by Sam Elliott and set to "America the Beautiful" as performed by Ray Charles. This was followed by an additional fireworks show, and a drop of red, white, and blue-colored confetti. The commission also announced that Times Square would partner on a ball drop event to mark midnight on Independence Day.

Details regarding the event were announced in April 2026; it was held as part of Giving 4th, a streaming charity telethon being organized by the United States Semiquincentennial Commission. The Giving 4th broadcast began from inside One Times Square, featuring performances by Mary J. Blige, Ne-Yo, and Brad Paisley, and then continued from Los Angeles on July 4 and 5. The ball was lowered eight times for midnight in each U.S. time zone, with the earliest at 10 a.m. ET for the Chamorro Time Zone (Guam and the Northern Mariana Islands), a highlighted event at midnight ET, and the last at 7 a.m. ET the following morning for the Samoa Time Zone (American Samoa). The semiquincentennial event was accompanied by public festivities inside One Times Square on July 4 and 5. Other media outlets covered the midnight ET event as part of their overall semiquincentennial coverage, such as CNN (which organized a spinoff of its Anderson Cooper and Andy Cohen-hosted New Year's special for the occasion), Fox News, and NewsNation.

Unlike New Year's Eve, it was not formally organized as a "public" event. The Department of Parks and Recreation had enacted a temporary order to allow limitations on special event permits granted between June 11 and July 19, due to high demand and concerns regarding the amount of police resources available due to both Independence Day and the 2026 FIFA World Cup (where MetLife Stadium was hosting matches, including the final).

=== Weather at midnight ===
According to National Weather Service records, since 1907–08, the average temperature in nearby Central Park during the New Year's Eve ball drop has been 34 °F (1 °C). The warmest occurred in 1965–66 and 1972–73 when the temperature was 58 °F (14 °C). The coldest occurred in 1917–18, when the temperature was 1 °F (−17 °C) and the wind chill was −18 °F (−28 °C). Affected by a continent-wide cold wave, the 2017–18 drop was the second-coldest on record, at 9 °F (−13 °C) and −4 °F (−20 °C) after wind chill. The third coldest ball drop occurred during the 1962–63 event, when the temperature was 11 °F (−12 °C) and the wind chill was −17 °F (−27 °C). Snow has fallen seven times, with the earliest being the 1926–27 event, and the most recent being the 2009–10 event, and rain/drizzle has fallen seventeen times, with the earliest being the 1918–19 event, and the most recent being the 2022–23 event. The records for most precipitation and snow for the whole day on New Year's Eve were both set in 1948, when 1.40 inches (36 mm) of precipitation and 4.0 inches (10 cm) of snow fell and the rainiest occurred during the 2018–19 event, when 1.02 inches of rain fell.

== Broadcasting ==
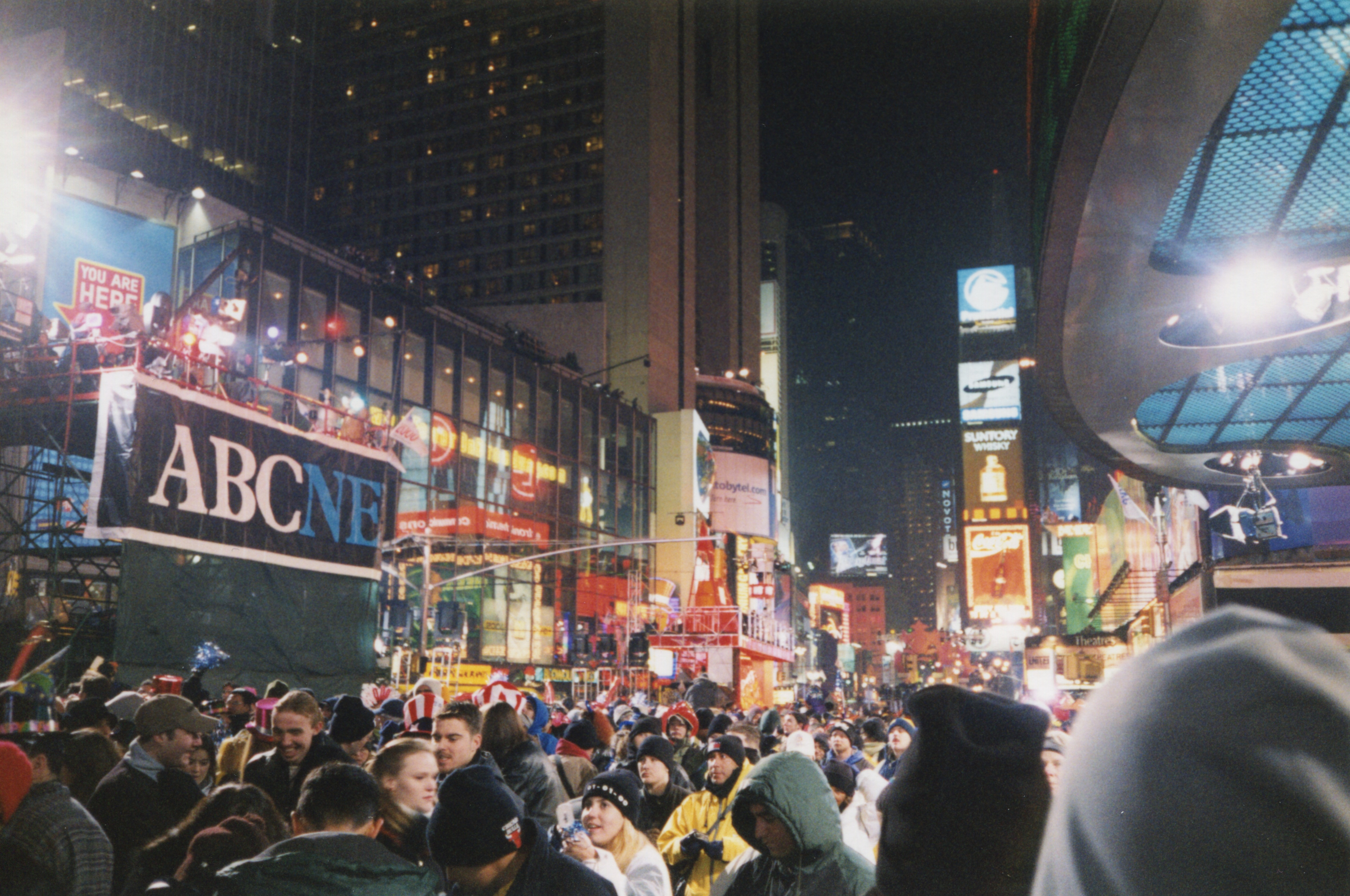
An ABC News stage in Times Square for its ABC 2000 Today broadcast

As a public event, the festivities and ball drop are often broadcast on television. Since the mid-1990s, a host pool feed has been provided to broadcasters for use in coverage, which for 2016–17 consisted of 21 cameras. Since 2009–10, an official webcast of the ball drop and its associated festivities has been produced, streamed via Livestream.com. Since 2022–23, the webcast has been hosted by actors, Jonathan Bennett, Jeremy Hassell, and Bennett's husband Jaymes Vaughan.

The event has been covered as part of New Year's Eve television specials on several major U.S. television networks, which usually intersperse on-location coverage from Times Square with entertainment segments, such as musical performances (some of which held live in Times Square as part of the event). By far the most notable of these is Dick Clark's New Year's Rockin' Eve; created, produced, and originally hosted by the entertainer Dick Clark until his death in 2012 (with Regis Philbin filling in for its 2004–05 broadcast), and currently hosted and executive produced by Ryan Seacrest, the program first aired on NBC in 1972 before moving to ABC, where it has been broadcast ever since. New Year's Rockin' Eve has consistently been the most-watched New Year's Eve special in the U.S. annually, peaking at 25.6 million viewers for its 2017–18 edition. Following the death of Dick Clark in April 2012, a crystal engraved with his name was added to the 2013 ball in tribute.

As of 2022–23, with Fox having quietly discontinued New Year's specials, and NBC having moved theirs from Times Square to Miami in 2021, CBS is the only other major English-language broadcast network to also provide coverage from Times Square, having added segments co-hosted by WCBS-TV chief meteorologist Lonnie Quinn to New Year's Eve Live: Nashville's Big Bash beginning that year.

Spanish-language network Univision broadcasts ¡Feliz!, hosted by Raúl de Molina of El Gordo y La Flaca. On cable, CNN carries coverage of the festivities, known as New Year's Eve Live, currently hosted by Anderson Cooper and Andy Cohen (the latter first replacing Kathy Griffin for 2018). Fox News carries the All-American New Year Bash, currently hosted by Jimmy Failla of Fox News Saturday Night.

=== Past broadcasts ===
Beginning in the 1940s, NBC broadcast coverage from Times Square anchored by Ben Grauer on both radio and television. Its coverage was later incorporated into special episodes of The Tonight Show, continuing through Johnny Carson and Jay Leno's tenures on the program. NBC would later introduce a dedicated special, New Year's Eve with Carson Daly (later renamed NBC's New Year's Eve), hosted by former MTV personality Carson Daly, which first began midnight coverage in 2006, and was discontinued in 2022 in favor of the Miley Cyrus-helmed Miley's New Year's Eve Party, from Miami.

From 1956 to 1976, CBS televised Guy Lombardo's annual New Year's Eve concert with his big band The Royal Canadians, most frequently from the Waldorf-Astoria's ballroom. It featured coverage from Times Square, and the band's signature rendition of "Auld Lang Syne" at midnight. After Lombardo's death in 1977, the special continued with Guy's younger brother Victor Lombardo as host and bandleader, but increasing competition from New Year's Rockin' Eve prompted CBS to replace it for 1979–80 with Happy New Year, America. The new special ran in various formats with different hosts (such as Paul Anka, Donny Osmond, Andy Williams, Late Show with David Letterman bandleader Paul Shaffer, and talk show host Montel Williams) until it was discontinued after 1996. Besides coverage during a special episode of Late Show for 1999, and America's Millennium for 2000, CBS would not air any national New Year's Eve specials again until 2021–22, when it premiered the Nashville's Big Bash special.

Beginning in 1991, Fox occasionally broadcast its New Year's specials from Times Square, with its most recent formats doing so having included New Year's Eve with Steve Harvey from 2017 to 2019, and New Year's Eve Toast & Roast in 2020, which was hosted by Ken Jeong and Joel McHale from Los Angeles with Kelly Osbourne reporting from Times Square. Fox intended for the special to return for 2021–22, but it was cancelled due to COVID-19 concerns in New York City. The following year, Fox forewent any New Year's Eve programming on the main network.

For 1999–2000, in lieu of New Year's Rockin' Eve, ABC News covered the festivities as part of its day-long telecast, ABC 2000 Today. Hosted by then-chief correspondent Peter Jennings, the broadcast featured coverage of New Year's festivities from around the world as part of the 2000 Today consortium led by the BBC and WGBH-TV. Dick Clark participated in ABC 2000 Today as a special correspondent, co-anchoring from Times Square alongside Jennings. The BBC's 2000 Today broadcast featured comedy character Dame Edna Everage (Barry Humphries) as a correspondent from Times Square.

MTV had broadcast coverage originating from the network's Times Square studios at One Astor Plaza, which was initially hosted by Carson Daly until his departure to NBC. For 2011, MTV also held its own ball drop in Seaside Heights, New Jersey, the setting of its popular reality series Jersey Shore, featuring cast member Snooki lowered inside a giant "hamster ball". Originally, MTV planned to hold the drop within its studio in Times Square, but the network was asked by city officials to conduct the drop elsewhere.

For 2019, prominent video game streamer Ninja hosted a 12-hour New Year's Eve stream on Twitch from Times Square, featuring matches of Fortnite Battle Royale with himself and special guests from a studio in the Paramount Building. Ninja made an on-stage appearance in Times Square during the festivities outside, which included a failed attempt to lead the crowd in a floss dance (a routine made popular by Fortnite).

== Use in promotion ==
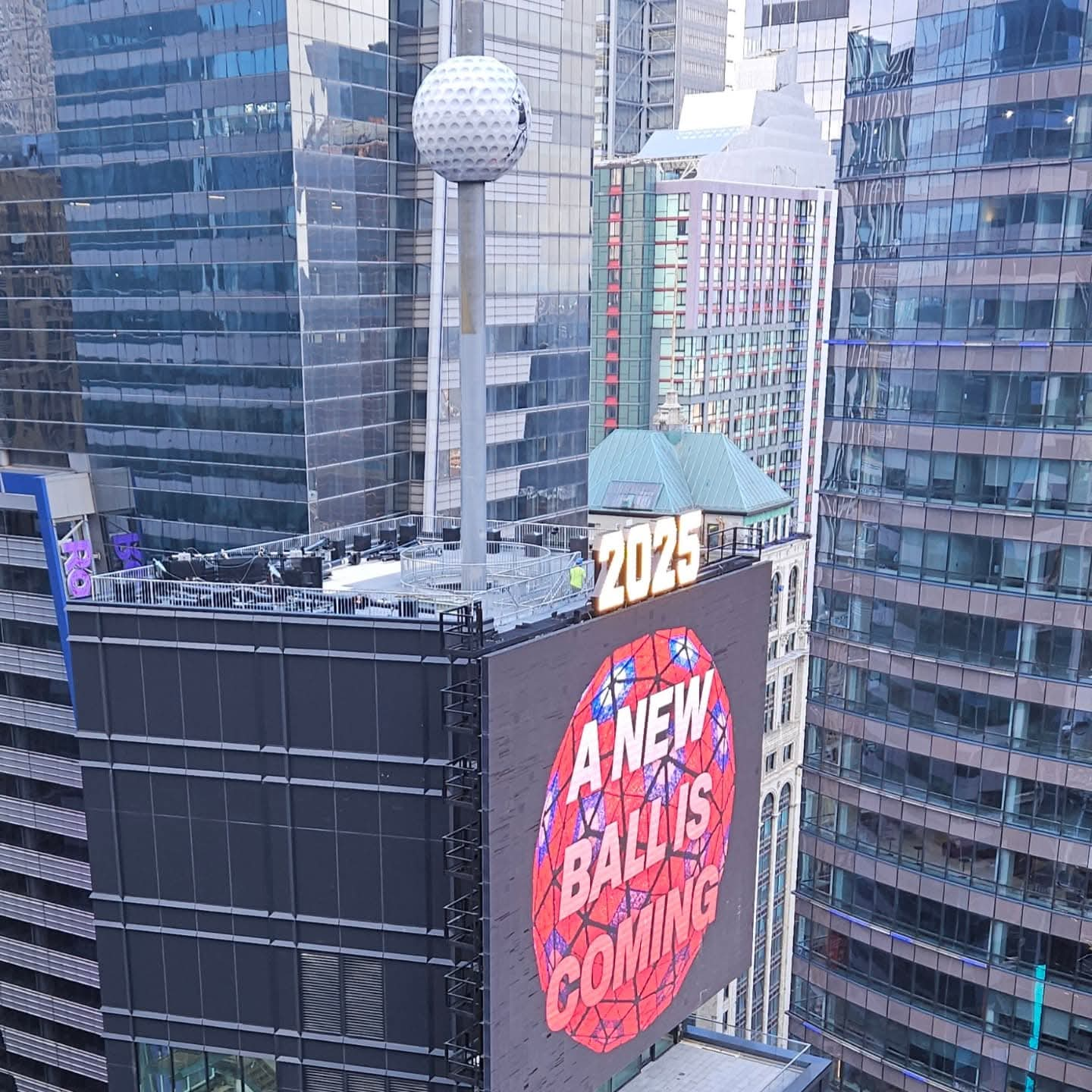
In July 2025, the outgoing sixth ball was replaced by a giant golf ball to promote Happy Gilmore 2.

On March 8, 1983, The New York Times reported that the Times Square Ball was to be dropped that night to celebrate the lighting of a neon sign on One Times Square.

For a period in July 2025 following the removal of the sixth ball, a giant Callaway golf ball took its place as part of a marketing campaign by Netflix for the film Happy Gilmore 2.

On June 12, 2026, at 4 p.m. ET, the ball rose with a Mars-themed lighting design, to mark the initial public offering of SpaceX, a company that has proposed colonizing Mars.

== See also ==
- List of objects dropped on New Year's Eve
